= Matheus Fonseca =

Brazilian musician and singer-songwriter

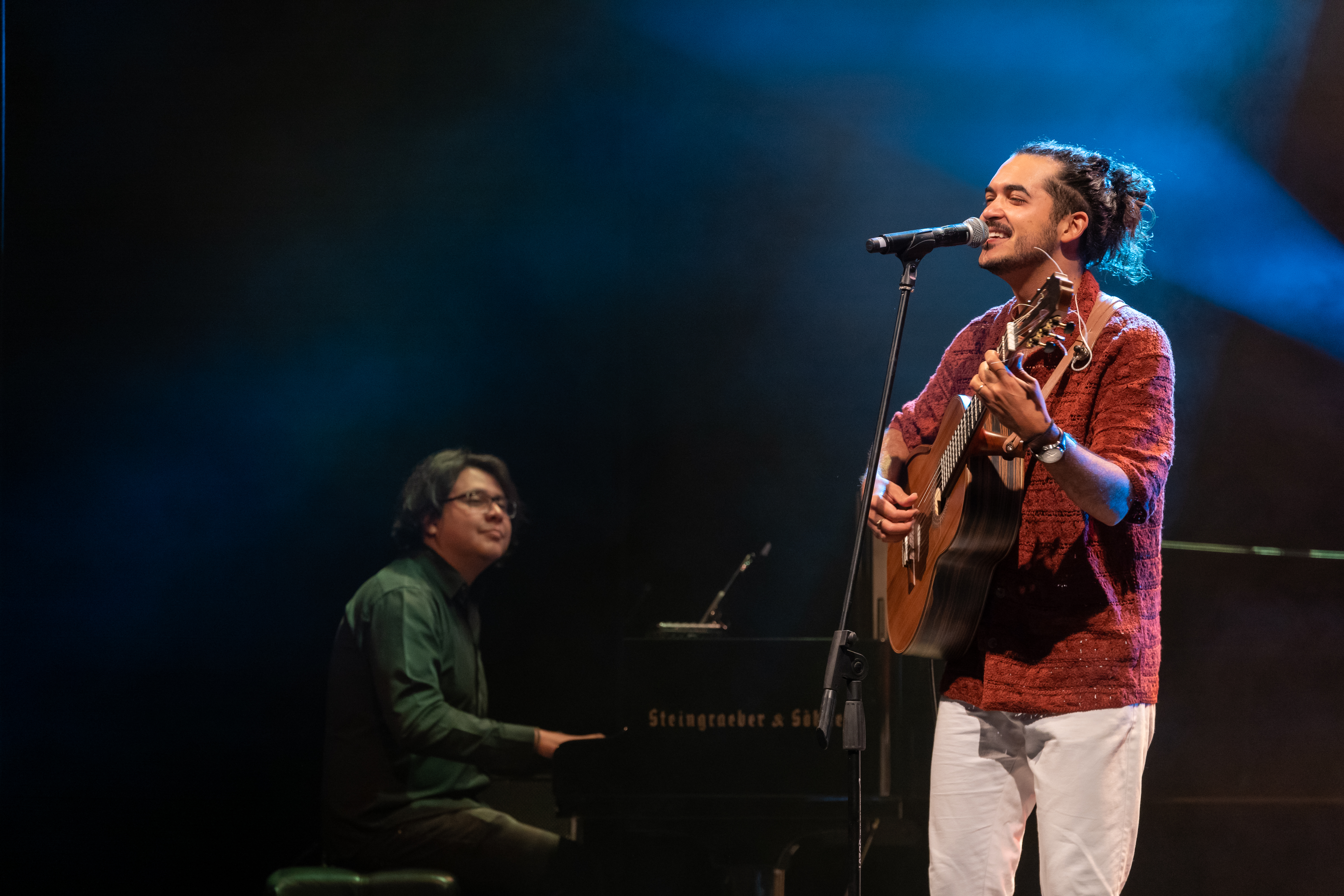
- Fonseca (R) at the 2024 Ecuador Jazz Festival
- Occupations: Musician; singer-songwriter

Matheus Fonseca (born October 9, 1991) is a Brazilian singer-songwriter based in Brazil, Switzerland, and the United States. He is one of the winners of the 2023 Luiz Melodia African-Brazilian Song Contest with his single "A Raiz" and second placed in the 2024 Brazilian National Song Festival with his single "Rua A (Siricutico)".

His style has been described as a "latin cocktail" of samba, reggae, jazz, and bossa. He was a participant in The Voice Portugal 2018 and in music festivals around the world.

== Select discography ==
Fonseca's key releases are:

- Utopía (2025, Single)
- Feitiço Carioca (2025, Single)
- Todo es una Apuesta (2024, Single)
- Latitude Zero, vol. 1 (2024, Album)
- Imigrante (Instrumental) (2023, Album)
- Imigrante (2023, Album)
- Enquanto a Terra Girar (2022, Album)
- Soteropolitana (2021, Single)
- Rota Alternativa (2019, Single)
- Quatro Luares de Júpiter (2018, EP)
