= The Voice Portugal =

Television series

- First season's logo
- Created by: John de Mol; Roel van Velzen
- Presented by: Catarina Furtado; Vasco Palmeirim
- Judges: Rui Reininho; Os Anjos; Mia Rose; Paulo Gonzo; Mickael Carreira; Marisa Liz; Anselmo Ralph; Aurea; Diogo Piçarra; António Zambujo; Carolina Deslandes; Dino D'Santiago; Fernando Daniel; Sara Correia; Sónia Tavares; Nininho Vaz Maia; Calema; David Carreira; Cláudia Pascoal; Luís Trigacheiro
- Composer: Martijn Schimmer
- Country of origin: Portugal
- Original language: Portuguese
- No. of seasons: 14

Production
- Executive producers: Pedro Curto; Piet-Hein Bakker
- Running time: 60–150 mins
- Production companies: CBV (2012); Shine Iberia (2014–2019, 2024–); ITV Studios (2020–2024)

Original release
- Network: RTP1
- Release: 29 October 2011 – present

Related
- The Voice Kids

The Voice Portugal (A Voz de Portugal in the first season) is a Portuguese reality singing competition and local version of The Voice, based on the original The Voice of Holland. The series employs a panel of four coaches who critique the artists' performances, and guide their teams of selected artists through the remainder of the season. They also compete to ensure that their act wins the competition, thus making them the winning coach. The original coaching panel consisted of Rui Reininho, Paulo Gonzo, Mia Rose, and the duo Os Anjos. The current coaching panel, for season 14, features Fernando Daniel, Sónia Tavares, Cláudia Pascoal, David & Mickael Carreira as a duo, and Luís Trigacheiro. In other seasons Marisa Liz, Anselmo Ralph, Aurea, António Zambujo, Diogo Piçarra, Carolina Deslandes, Dino D'Santiago, Sara Correia, Nininho Vaz Maia, and Calema participated as coaches.

== History ==
The first season premiered on 29 October 2011, on RTP1, with the finale airing on 25 February 2012, crowning Denis Filipe as the winner. The show came back in 2014 with its second season with new coaches, a new co-host, a new show name, and new Repórteres V (backstage hosts). The winner of the second season was Rui Drumond. RTP1 later announced the first season of The Voice Kids and the third season of the main show, which premiered on 11 October 2015 with a new coach, Aurea. In its third season, the show proved to be a hit and was subsequently renewed for a fourth season, which was premiered in 2016.

The show is hosted by Catarina Furtado since the inaugural season, and, in the second season, Vasco Palmeirim joined her to conduce the competition. The show also features backstage hosts, called Repórteres V. Diogo Beja was the first Repórter V back in 2011, being replaced in the second season by Laura Figueiredo, Mariana Monteiro, and Pedro Fernandes. In the third season, Jani Gabriel became the only Repórter V.

== Concept ==
Each season begins with the "blind auditions" (provas cegas), where coaches form their team of artists whom they mentor through the remainder of the season. The coaches' chairs are faced toward the audience during artists' performances; those interested in an artist press their button, which turns their chair towards the artist and illuminates the bottom of the chair to read "I want you." After the performance, an artist is either defaulted to the only coach who turned around or selects their coach if more than one expresses interest.

In the "battles" round (batalhas), each coach pairs two of their team members to perform together and then chooses one to advance in the competition. A new element was added in season two; coaches were given two "steals", allowing each coach to save two individuals who were eliminated during a battle of another team.

The "knockouts" round (Tira-Teimas) was introduced in season two, where a pair of artists within a team are selected to go directly to the live shows without performing, and the other artists will have to perform. Only six artists go to the live shows.

In the live shows phase of the competition, artists perform against each other. People's votes help decide who stays on the show and who leaves.

== Timeline of coaches and hosts ==
Coach	Seasons													
Coach	1	2	3	4	5	6	7	8	9	10	11	12	13	14
Rui Reininho														
Mia Rose														
Os Anjos														
Paulo Gonzo														
Mickael Carreira														(Note: Mickael Carreira and David Carreira are featured together as a duo coaching team in the fourteenth season.)
Marisa Liz														
Anselmo Ralph														
Aurea														
Diogo Piçarra														
António Zambujo														
Dino D'Santiago														
Carolina Deslandes														
Fernando Daniel														
Sónia Tavares														
Sara Correia														
Nininho Vaz Maia														
Calema														
David Carreira														
Cláudia Pascoal														
Luís Trigacheiro														SC
Host	1	2	3	4	5	6	7	8	9	10	11	12	13	14
Catarina Furtado														
Vasco Palmeirim														
Backstage host	1	2	3	4	5	6	7	8	9	10	11	12	13	14
Diogo Beja														
Laura Figueiredo														
Mariana Monteiro														
Pedro Fernandes														
Jani Gabriel														
Mafalda de Castro														
Fábio Lopes														
Catarina Maia														
Maria Petronilho														

=== Coaches' line-up ===
Coaches' line-up by chairs order
Season	Year(s)	Coaches			
Season	Year(s)	1	2	3	4
1	2011–12	Rui	Mia	Anjos	Paulo
2	2014	Mickael	Marisa	Anselmo	Rui
3	2015–16	Mickael	Marisa	Aurea	Anselmo
4	2016	Marisa	Mickael	Aurea	Anselmo
5	2017	Mickael	Marisa	Aurea	Anselmo
6	2018	Mickael	Aurea	Marisa	Anselmo
7	2019–20	Diogo	Marisa	Zambujo	Aurea
8	2020–21	Aurea	Diogo	Marisa	Zambujo
9	2021–22	Marisa	Zambujo	Aurea	Diogo
10	2022–23	Marisa	Dino	Diogo	Carolina
11	2023–24	Fernando	Sónia	Zambujo	Sara
12	2024–25	Fernando	Sónia	Nininho	Sara
13	2025–26	Calema	Sónia	Fernando	Sara
14	2026–27	David & Mickael	Sónia	Fernando	Cláudia

== Gallery ==
Coaches gallery

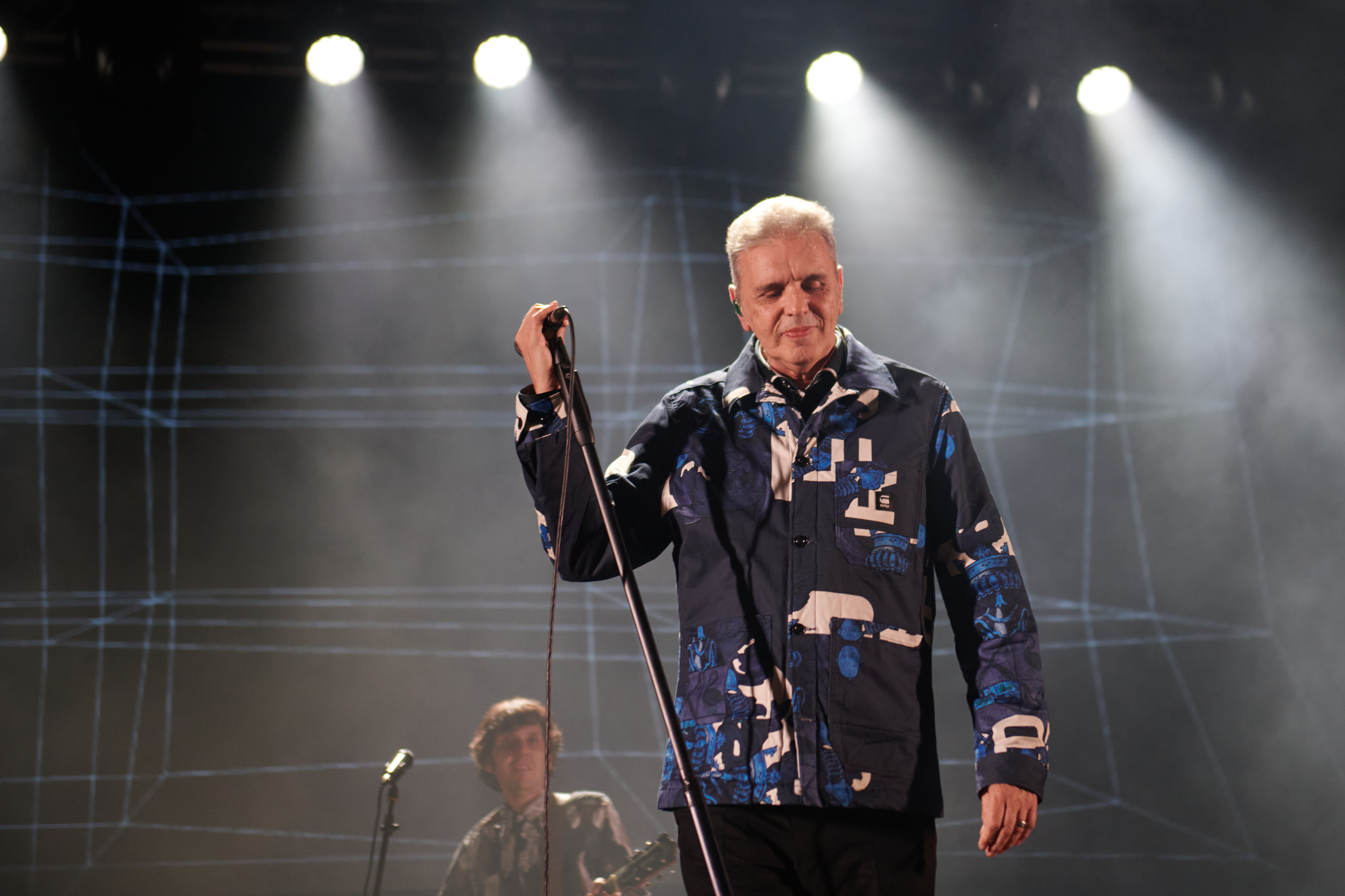
Rui Reininho (1–2)

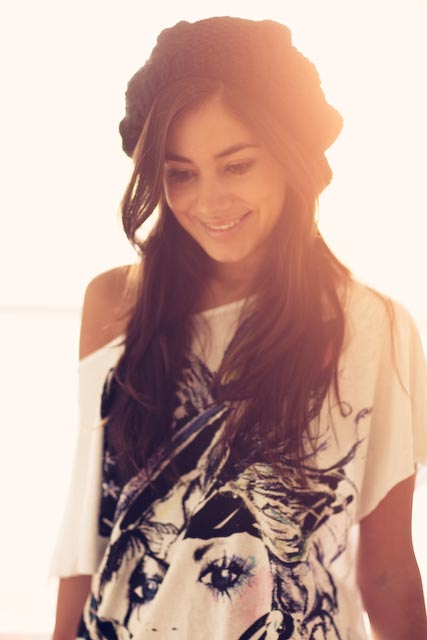
Mia Rose (1)

Os Anjos (duo: 1)

Paulo Gonzo (1)

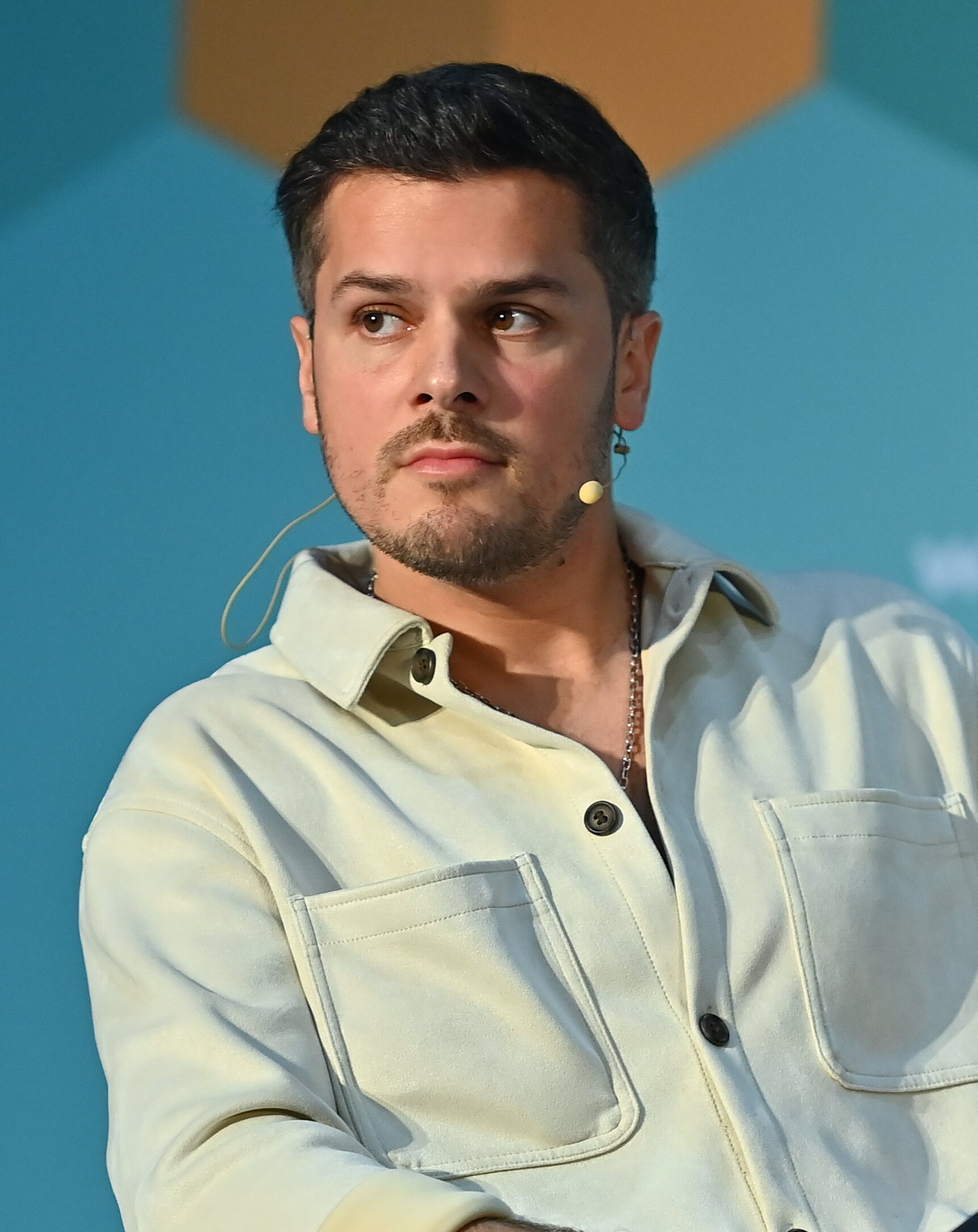
Mickael Carreira (solo: 2–6, duo: 14–present)

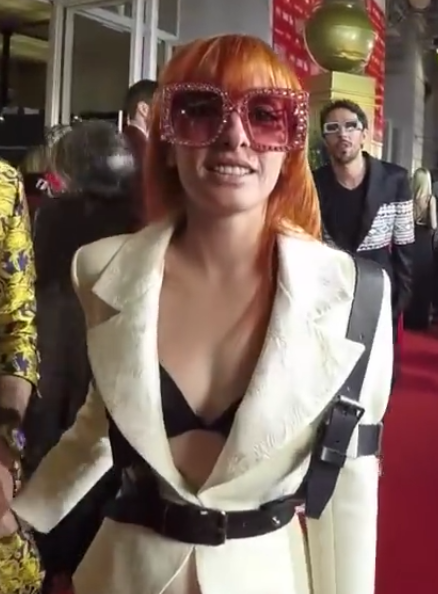
Marisa Liz (2–10)

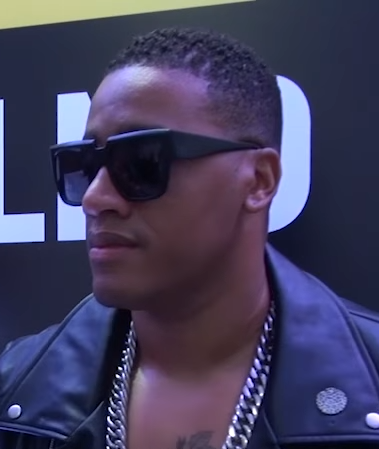
Anselmo Ralph (2–6)

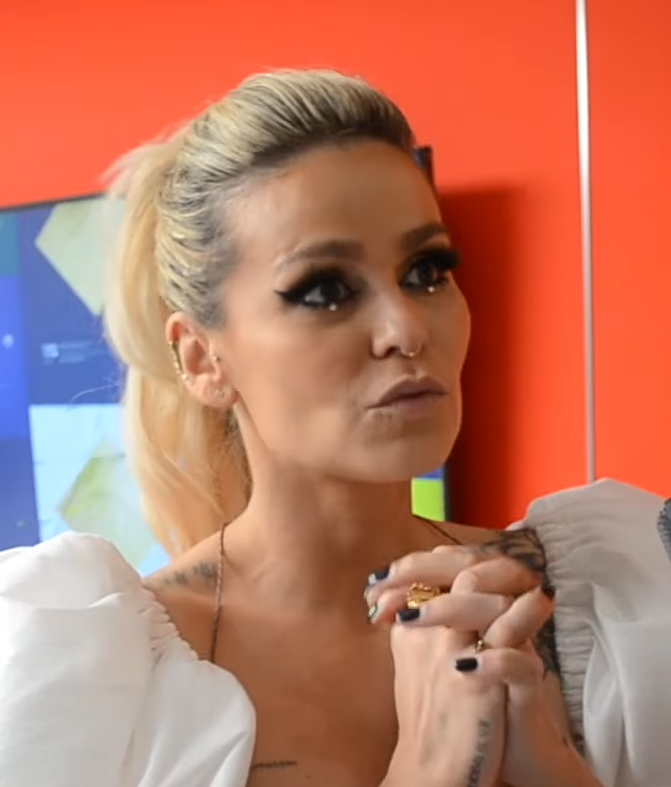
Aurea (3–9)

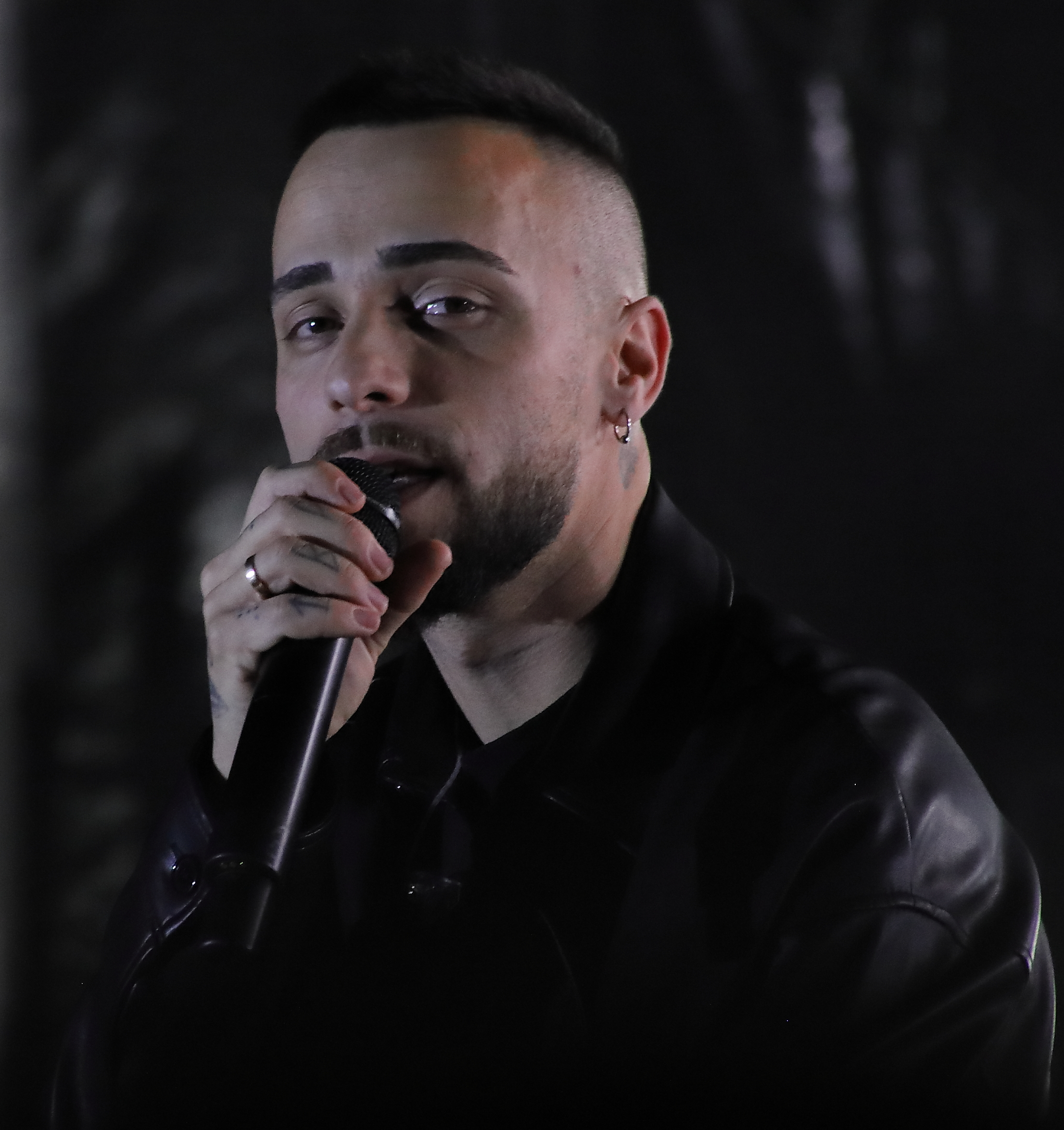
Diogo Piçarra (7–10)

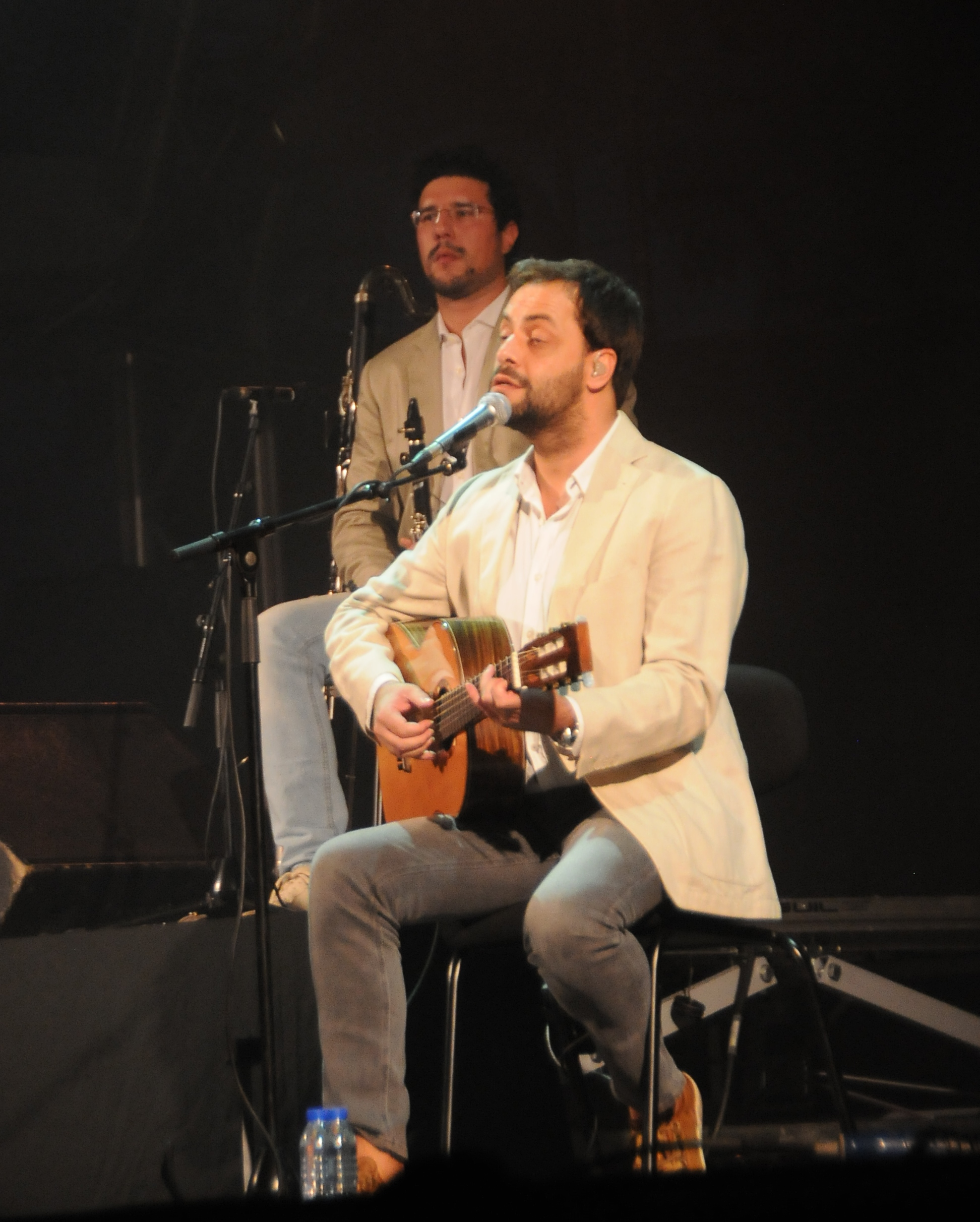
António Zambujo (7–9, 11)

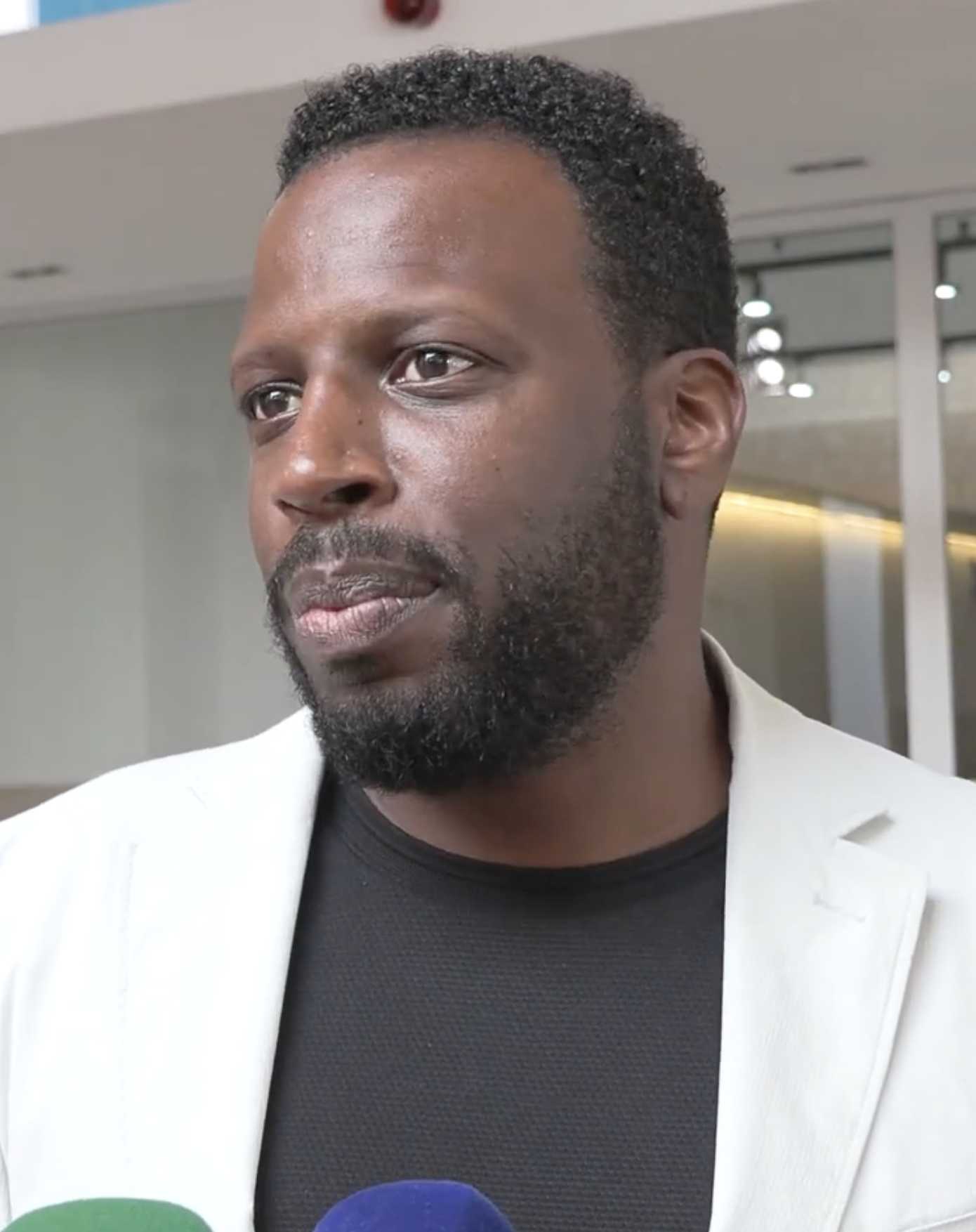
Dino D'Santiago (10)

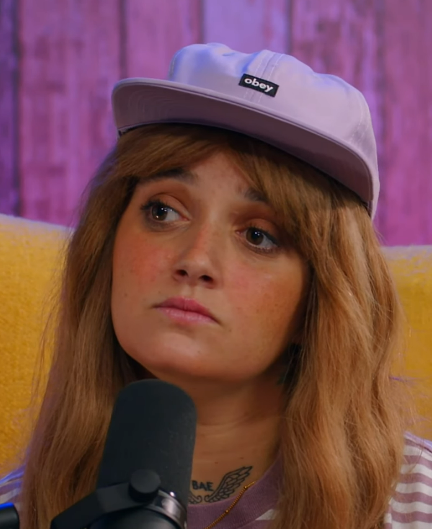
Carolina Deslandes (10)

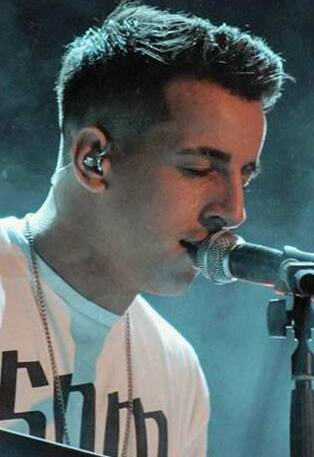
Fernando Daniel (11–present)

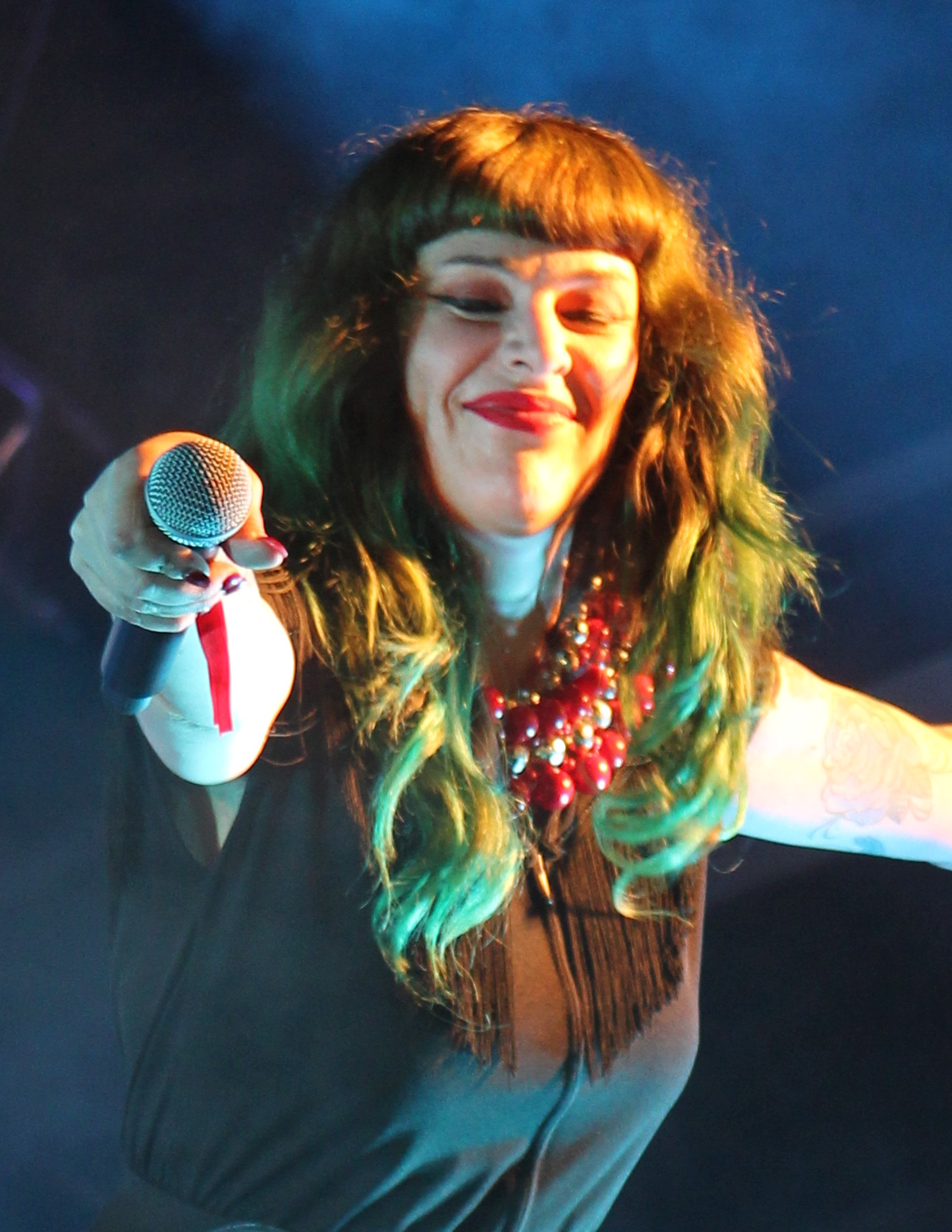
Sónia Tavares (11–present)

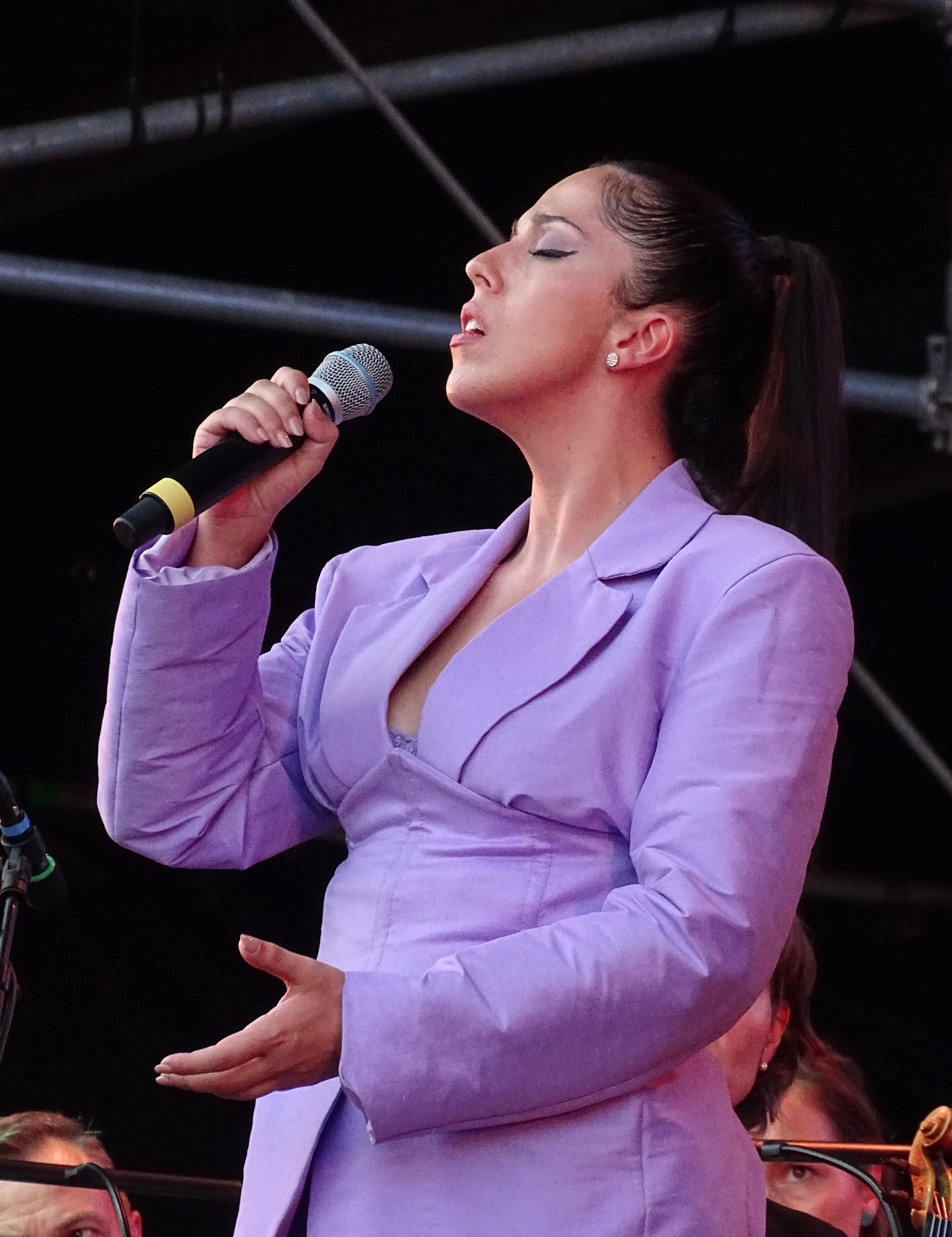
Sara Correia (11–13)

Nininho Vaz Maia (12)

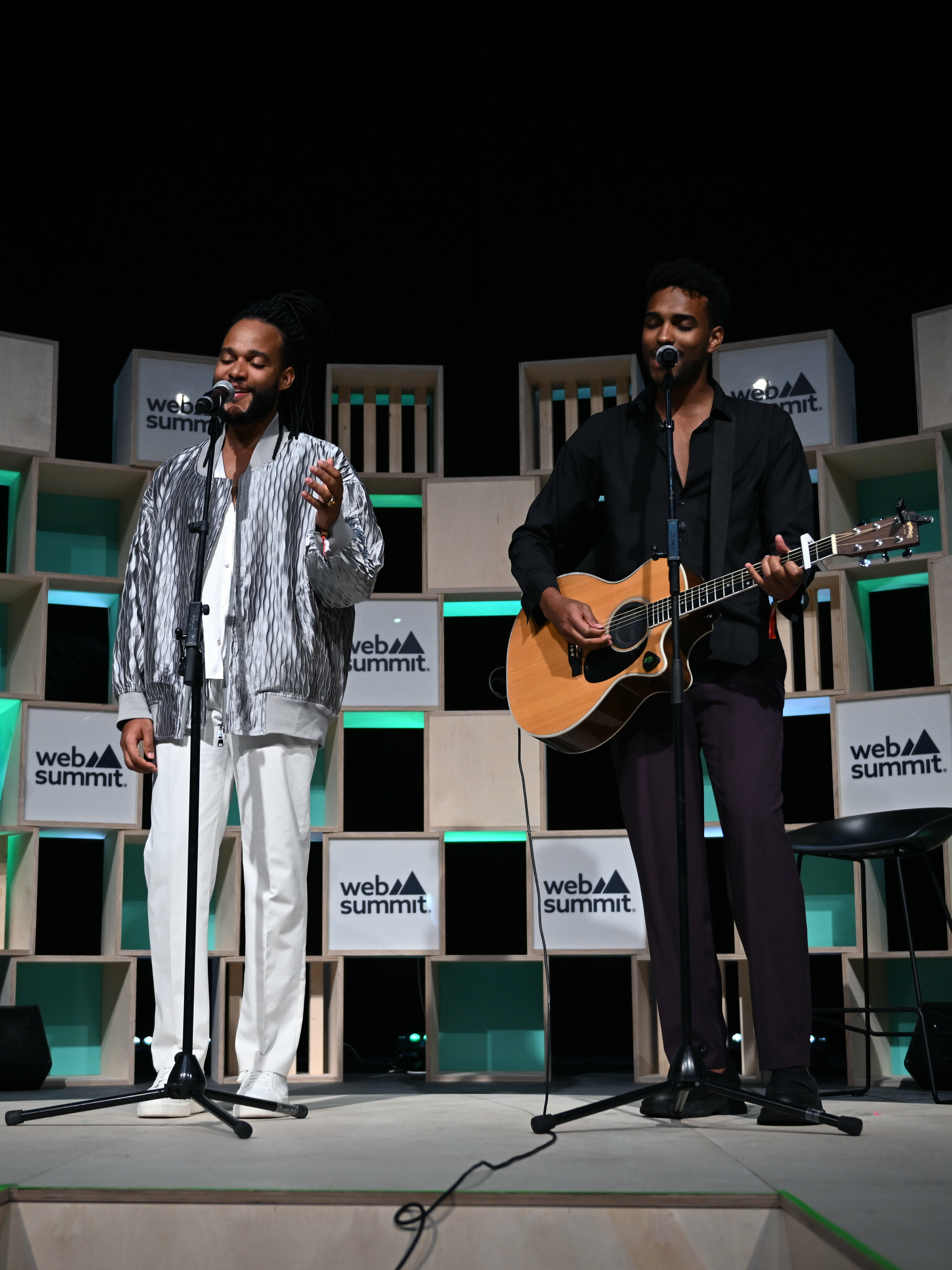
Calema (duo: 13)

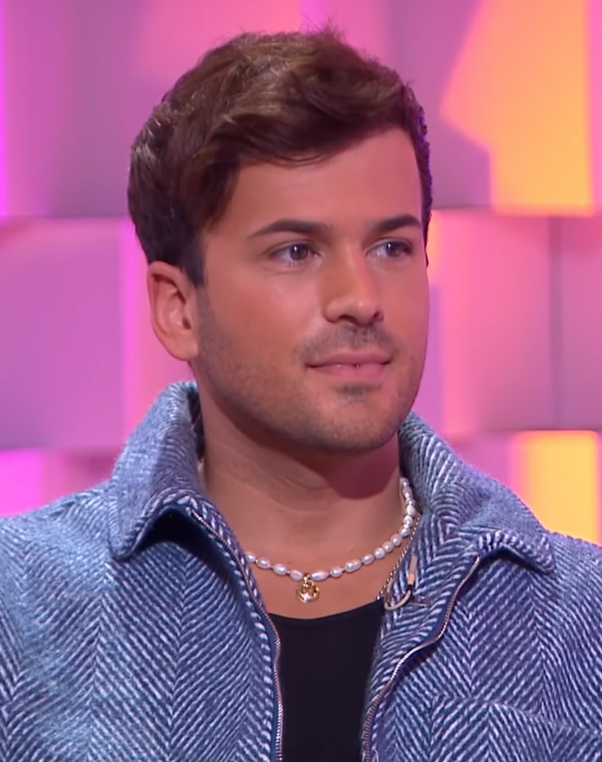
David Carreira (duo: 14–present)

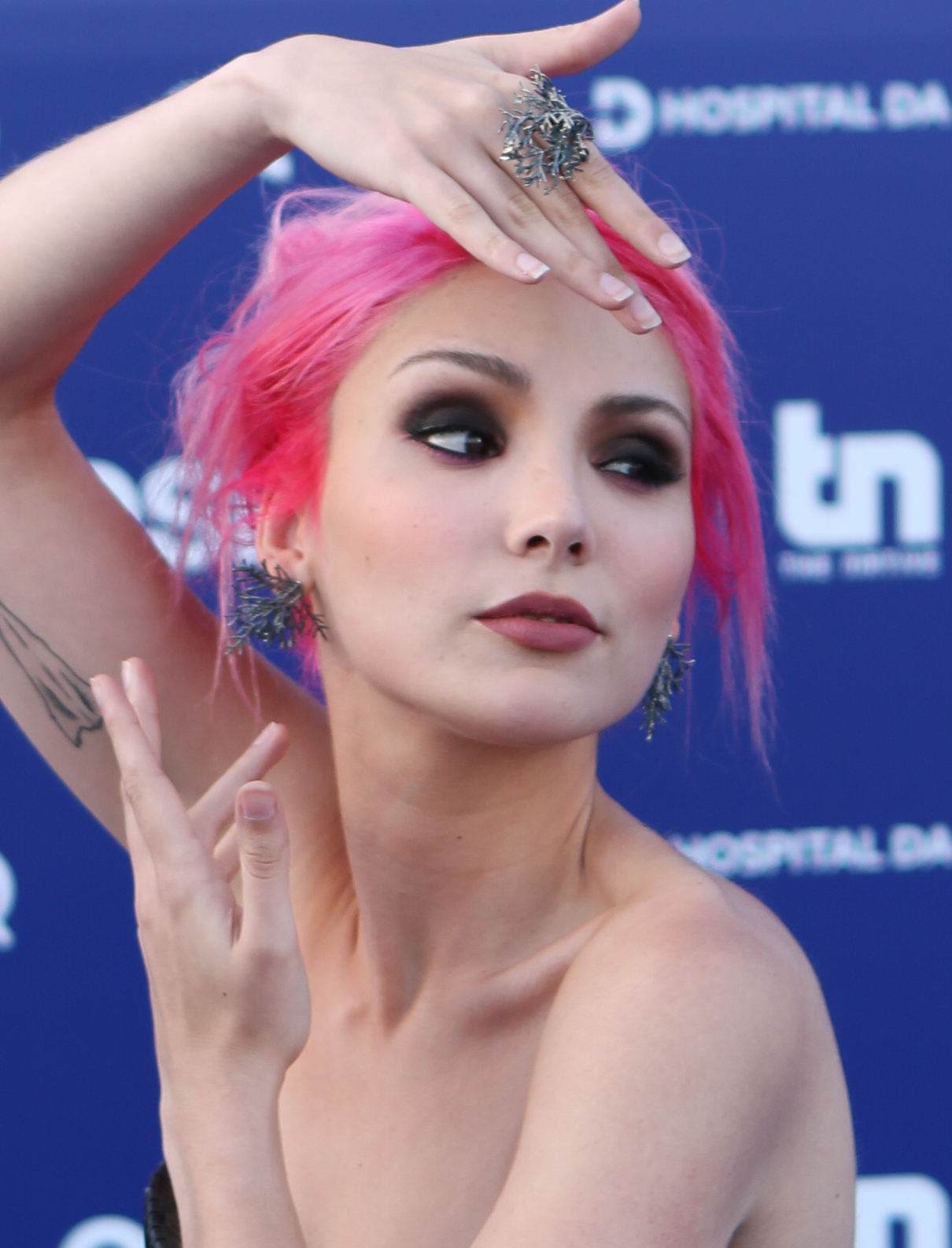
Cláudia Pascoal (14–present)

Luís Trigacheiro (Second Chance: 14–present)

== Coaches' teams and their artists ==
- These are each of the coaches' teams throughout the seasons' live shows. Winners are in **bold** and finalists in italic.

Season	Coaches and contestants			
1	Team Rui	Team Mia	Team Anjos	Team Paulo
1	**Denis Filipe**; Pedro Poseiro; João Pedro Rosas; Marisa Almeida; Celeste Cortez; João Castro; Joana Alves; Ana Margarida Teixeira	Daniel Moreira; Salvador Seixas; Deborah Gonçalves; Teresa Santos; Inês Martins; Ana Carolina Veiga; Luís de Almeida; Rui Sirgado	Ricardo Oliveira; Carla Ribeiro; Joanna Garcia; Vasco Duarte; Sara Henriques; Luísa & Inês Silva; Bruno Francisco; Joana Barata	Bianca Adrião; Joana Jorge; Sílvio Switha; Sandrine Orsini; Sílvia Silva; Salomé Caldeira; Rui Pereira; Pedro Coelho
2	Team Mickael	Team Marisa	Team Anselmo	Team Rui
2	Nuno Ribeiro; Jéssica Cipriano; Mariana Bandhold; Carlos Costa; Bernardo Nunes; Diogo Correia	Luís Sequeira; Bianca Barros; Nuno Pinto; Bruno Vieira; Ricardo Morais; Renata Gonçalves	**Rui Drumond**; Leonor Andrade; Rita Seidi; Pedro Garcia; João Parreira; Mariana Azevedo	Alexandre Casimiro; Tiago Garrinhas; Constança Gonçalves; Sara Ribeiro; Ricardo Costa; Pablo Oliveira
3	Team Mickael	Team Marisa	Team Aurea	Team Anselmo
3	**Deolinda Kinzimba**; Guilherme Azevedo; Milene Sofia; Sofia Silva	Sérgio Sousa; Alfredo Costa; Pedro Maceiras; Ricardo Mestre	Patrícia Teixeira; Soraia Tavares; Inês Côrte-Real; Nayr Faquirá	Pedro Gonçalves; Joana Melo; Albina Bushmalyova; Filipa Azevedo
4	**Fernando Daniel**; Sérgio Alves; Fausto Vasconcelos; Marcos Bessa; Vera Lima; Juliana Linharelhos	Miguel Carmona; Andrea Verdugo; Daniel Galvão; Maria Bradshaw; Marisa Almeida; Bruno Pina	Francisco Murta; Jéssica Ângelo; David Gomes; Edna; Catarina Castanhas; Bertílio Santos	Marta Carvalho; Márcio Vicente; Cristina Afonso; Joana Lopes; Alexandra Moita; Laura Vargas
5	Inês Simões; Fábio Mouzinho; Simão Quintans; Salomé Caldeira	**Tomás Adrião**; Tiago Nacarato; Ricardo Barroso; Ricardo Neiva	Ana Paula; Cláudia Pascoal; Joaquim Cabral; Diana Lucas	Kátia Moreira; Marta Pinto; Telma Domingues; Vanessa Coelho
6	Gonçalo Lopes; Gabriel Gomes; Elsa Frias; Hugo Baptista	**Marvi**; Diana Castro; Isaías Manhiça; Gonçalo Santos	Soraia Cardoso; João Palma; Márcia Trabulo; Leo	Vânia Dilac; Joana Couto; Zé Maia Rodrigues; Nuel
7	Team Diogo	Team Marisa	Team Zambujo	Team Aurea
7	Joana Alegre; Gabriel Silva; Pedro do Vale; Caroletta	Sebastião Oliveira; Francisco Sequeira; Filipa Maldonado; Marisa Oliveira	**Rita Sanches**; Carolina Pinto; Michael Cranmer; Matheus Paraizo	Gabriel de Rose; Wesley Semé; Victor Estanga; Nuno Esperto
8	Diogo Leite; Jéssica Ângelo; Gonçalo Bilé; Kevin Lopes; Paloma & Jorginho; Catarina Pereira	**Luís Trigacheiro**; Luciana & Pri; João Amaral; Rafaela Monteiro; Susana Costa; Favela Lacroix	Tiago Silva; Mariana Rebelo; Mari Segura; Íris Silva; Maria Casal Ribeiro; Francisco Vicente	Tiago Barbosa; Miguel & João; Catarina Archer; Nelson Sousa; Alicia Camps; Rita Laranjeira
9	Daniel Fernandes; Edmundo Inácio; Aliança Velha; Matheus Alcântara; Francisca Rocha; Lusitana	João Leote; João Neves; Inês Marques Lucas; Miguel Dias; Inês Martins; Pedro Tavares	**Rodrigo Lourenço**; Maria Inês Graça; Beatriz Cepeda; Rui Taipa; Márcio Gonçalves; Rita Medeiros; Maria Pereira	Mariana Rocha; Francisca Oliveira; Huca; Rui Pedro; Matilde Jacob; Sara Badalo
10	Team Marisa	Team Dino	Team Diogo	Team Carolina
10	**Gustavo Reinas**; Rúben Torres; João Ribeiro; António Ataíde	Coastel; Soraia Morais; Diogo Carapinha; Vincente Augusto; Lourenço Ataíde	Rebeca Reinaldo; Wander Isaac; Isaac Costa; Clara de Gail	Paulo Lapa; Sasha Silva; Beatriz Santos; Margarida & Tomás; Francisco Barata
11	Team Fernando	Team Sónia	Team Zambujo	Team Sara
11	Guilherme Baptista; Herineu Prescindo; João Duarte; Cristiano Calisto	Manuel Antunes; Daniel Pinto; Rafael Abrantes; Sofia Silva	**José Bacelar**; Maria João Soares; Matilde Oliveira; Vânia Mussagy	Mafalda Vasques; Diogo Oliveira; Catarina Lima; Mariana Santana
12	Team Fernando	Team Sónia	Team Nininho	Team Sara
12	**Rafael Ribeiro**; Mafalda Ramos; Mariana Cunha; Diogo Videira	Bruno Pereira; Beatriz Silva; Marisa Oliveira; Filipe Pires	Ricardo Maia; Rita Nunes; Catarina Faria; Neemias Silva	Maria João Duque; Gonçalo Lopes; Joana Horta; Hélia Bunga
13	Team Calema	Team Sónia	Team Fernando	Team Sara
13	Lucas Pina; Emanuel Almeida; Linne Manuel; Filipe Pereira	**Rafael Alves**; Manoel Mattos; Alexandre Costa; Jéssica Xaveiro	António Paulino; Júlia Ochôa; Joaquim Ferreira; Rúben Lameira	Bruno Sendas; Sofia Pires; Manuel Ramos; Débora D'Oliveira
14	Team David & Mickael	Team Sónia	Team Fernando	Team Cláudia
14	Current season			

== Series overview ==
Warning: the following table presents a significant amount of different colors.

Teams color key
Artist from Team Anjos	Artist from Team Mickael	Artist from Team Fernando
Artist from Team Mia	Artist from Team Aurea	Artist from Team Sara
Artist from Team Paulo	Artist from Team Diogo	Artist from Team Sónia
Artist from Team Rui	Artist from Team Zambujo	Artist from Team Nininho
Artist from Team Anselmo	Artist from Team Carolina	Artist from Team Calema
Artist from Team Marisa	Artist from Team Dino

The Voice Portugal series overview
Season	Year	Winner	Runner-up	Third place	Fourth place	Fifth place	Winning coach	Presenter(s)
1	2011–2012	Denis Filipe	Ricardo Oliveira	Daniel Moreira	Bianca Adrião	—N/a	Rui Reininho	Catarina Furtado
2	2014	Rui Drumond	Luís Sequeira	Alexandre Casimiro	Nuno Ribeiro	—N/a	Anselmo Ralph	Catarina Furtado, Vasco Palmeirim
3	2015–2016	Deolinda Kinzimba	Pedro Gonçalves	Sérgio Sousa	Patrícia Teixeira	—N/a	Mickael Carreira	Catarina Furtado, Vasco Palmeirim
4	2016	Fernando Daniel	Francisco Murta	Miguel Carmona	Marta Carvalho	—N/a	Mickael Carreira	Catarina Furtado, Vasco Palmeirim
5	2017	Tomás Adrião	Ana Paula Rada	Kátia Moreira	Inês Simões	—N/a	Marisa Liz	Catarina Furtado, Vasco Palmeirim
6	2018	Marvi	Diana Castro	Soraia Cardoso	Vânia Dilac	Gonçalo Lopes	Marisa Liz	Catarina Furtado, Vasco Palmeirim
7	2019–2020	Rita Sanches	Gabriel de Rose	Joana Alegre	Carolina Pinto	Sebastião Oliveira	António Zambujo	Catarina Furtado, Vasco Palmeirim
8	2020–2021	Luís Trigacheiro	Tiago Silva	Tiago Barbosa	Miguel & João	Diogo Leite	Marisa Liz	Catarina Furtado, Vasco Palmeirim
9	2021–2022	Rodrigo Lourenço	João Leote	Daniel Fernandes	Edmundo Inácio	Mariana Rocha	António Zambujo	Catarina Furtado, Vasco Palmeirim
10	2022–2023	Gustavo Reinas	Paulo Lapa	Rebeca Reinaldo	Coastel	—N/a	Marisa Liz	Catarina Furtado, Vasco Palmeirim
11	2023–2024	José Bacelar	Maria João Soares	Guilherme Baptista	Mafalda Vasques	Manuel Antunes	António Zambujo	Catarina Furtado
12	2024–2025	Rafael Ribeiro	Ricardo Maia	Rita Nunes	Maria João Duque	Bruno Pereira	Fernando Daniel	Catarina Furtado
13	2025–2026	Rafael Alves	António Paulino	Lucas Pina	Bruno Sendas	Emanuel Almeida	Sónia Tavares	Catarina Furtado
14	2026–2027	Current season						Catarina Furtado

== Coaches' results ==
Considering the final placement of the contestants who are members of their team (not the final placement of the coaches):

Coach	Winner	Runner-up	Third place	Fourth place	Fifth place
Marisa Liz	4 times (5, 6, 8, 10)	3 times (2, 6, 9)	2 times (3, 4)	—	1 time (7)
António Zambujo	3 times (7, 9, 11)	2 times (8, 11)	—	1 time (7)	—
Mickael Carreira	2 times (3, 4)	—	—	2 times (2, 5)	1 time (6)
Anselmo Ralph	1 time (2)	1 time (3)	1 time (5)	2 times (4, 6)	—
Fernando Daniel	1 time (12)	1 time (13)	1 time (11)	—	—
Rui Reininho	1 time (1)	—	1 time (2)	—	—
Sónia Tavares	1 time (13)	—	—	—	2 times (11, 12)
Aurea	—	3 times (4, 5, 7)	2 times (6, 8)	2 times (3, 8)	1 time (9)
Nininho Vaz Maia	—	1 time (12)	1 time (12)	—	—
Carolina Deslandes	—	1 time (10)	—	—	—
Os Anjos	—	1 time (1)	—	—	—
Diogo Piçarra	—	—	3 times (7, 9, 10)	1 time (9)	1 time (8)
Calema	—	—	1 time (13)	—	1 time (13)
Mia Rose	—	—	1 time (1)	—	—
Sara Correia	—	—	—	3 times (11–13)	—
Dino D'Santiago	—	—	—	1 time (10)	—
Paulo Gonzo	—	—	—	1 time (1)	—
David & Mickael Carreira	TBD				
Cláudia Pascoal	TBD				

== Seasons' synopses ==
Color key
Winner	Eliminated in the Live Cross Battles (season 10)
Runner-up	Eliminated in the Knockouts (seasons 2–9)
Third place	Stolen in the Battles (season 2–9)
Fourth place	Eliminated after being in "All or Nothing Room" (seasons 5–6)
Fifth place (season 6–9, 11–)	Eliminated in Battles
Eliminated in the Live shows	Withdraw (seasons 4–5, 8)

=== Season 1 (2011–2012) ===
The first season, under the name A Voz de Portugal, was hosted by Catarina Furtado, and the four coaches were singer-songwriter Paulo Gonzo, pop rock duo Anjos, YouTube sensation Mia Rose, and GNR lead vocalist Rui Reininho.

=== Season 2 (2014) ===
The second season of The Voice Portugal was hosted by Furtado and Vasco Palmeirim. Reininho returned as coach alongside new coaches Mickael Carreira, Amor Electro vocalist Marisa Liz, and Anselmo Ralph. The knockouts round was introduced during this season.

Coaching teams
Coaches	Artists					
Mickael Carreira						
Mickael Carreira	Nuno Ribeiro	Jéssica Cipriano	Mariana Bandhold	Carlos Costa	Bernardo Nunes	Diogo Correia
Mickael Carreira	Catarina Alves	André Carneiro	Maria C. Moreira	Sandra & Rui	~~Renata Gonçalves~~	~~Inês Guedes~~
Mickael Carreira	Mário Pedrosa	Catarina Correia	Dinis Coutinho	Filipa Henriques	Joel Ferreira	Alexandre Guerra
Marisa Liz						
Marisa Liz	Luís Sequeira	Bianca Barros	Nuno Pinto	Bruno Vieira	Ricardo Morais	Renata Gonçalves
Marisa Liz	Inês Góis	Miguel Monteiro	Gabriela Marramaque	Fábio de Sousa	~~Maria C. Moreira~~	Inês Lucas
Marisa Liz	Sandy Soares	Nádia Marques	Teresa Rocha	Anouska Romão	Mariana Morais	João Alves
Anselmo Ralph						
Anselmo Ralph	Rui Drumond	Leonor Andrade	Rita Seidi	Pedro Garcia	João Parreira	Mariana Azevedo
Anselmo Ralph	Elisabete Batista	Vanessa Martins	David Fonseca	Inês Guedes	~~Jéssica Cipriano~~	~~Constança Gonçalves~~
Anselmo Ralph	~~Ricardo Costa~~	Maria Santos	Carla Batista	Diogo Binnema	Sofia Fortuna	Raquel Silva
Rui Reininho						
Rui Reininho	Alexandre Casimiro	Tiago Garrinhas	Constança Gonçalves	Sara Ribeiro	Ricardo Costa	Pablo Oliveira
Rui Reininho	Gonçalo Silva	Glória Pretorius	Benedita Gonçalves	Tatiana André	~~Mariana Azevedo~~	~~Fábio de Sousa~~
Rui Reininho	Gabriela Pina	Bruno Lestre	Rebeca Reinaldo	Patrícia Araújo	Marta Carrilho	Carolina Santos
Note: Italicized names are stolen artists.

=== Season 3 (2015–2016) ===
The third season of The Voice Portugal began in October 2015. All panelists from last season returned except Reininho, who was replaced by a new coach, Aurea.

Coaching teams
Coaches	Artists					
Mickael Carreira						
Mickael Carreira	Deolinda Kinzimba	Guilherme Azevedo	Milene Sofia	Sofia Silva	Beatriz Felício	
Mickael Carreira	Pedro Melo	Rúben Rodrigues	Rui & Marcos	~~Ana Vasconcelos~~	Joana Ferreira	
Mickael Carreira	Ema & Sara	Catarina Melim	Letícia Carvalho	Inês Semide	Francisco Coelho	
Marisa Liz						
Marisa Liz	Sérgio Sousa	Alfredo Costa	Pedro Maceiras	Ricardo Mestre	Joana Ferreira	
Marisa Liz	Luís Baptista	Ana Vasconcelos	Romeu Bairos	~~Patrícia Teixeira~~	~~Pedro Gonçalves~~	
Marisa Liz	Júnior Oliveira	Natasha Semmynova	Vânia Gonçalves	Alex Vantrue	José Costa	Marta Sousa
Aurea						
Aurea	Patrícia Teixeira	Soraia Tavares	Inês Côrte-Real	Nayr Faquirá	Ana Sofia Neto	
Aurea	Emanuel Neves	Nuno V. Oliveira	Verónica Arruda	~~Sofia Silva~~	Simão Quintans	
Aurea	Bruna Costa	Mariana Tereso	Maria Silva	Lúcia Mourinho	Ana I. Freitas	
Anselmo Ralph						
Anselmo Ralph	Pedro Gonçalves	Joana Melo	Albina Bushmalyova	Filipa Azevedo	Ana C. Rodrigues	
Anselmo Ralph	Joana Santos	Maria Inês Paris	Sara Silva	Vanessa Valadas	Rafaela Macedo	
Anselmo Ralph	Romeu Neto	Laura Vargas	Manuela Lima	Marco da Silva	Patrícia Ferreira	
Note: Italicized names are stolen artists.

=== Season 4 (2016) ===
The fourth season was announced at the end of the third season, in January 2016, and premiered nine months later, in October. The hosts and coaches remained the same.

Coaching teams
Coaches	Artists					
Marisa Liz						
Marisa Liz	Miguel Carmona	Andrea Verdugo	Daniel Galvão	Maria Bradshaw	Marisa Almeida	Bruno Pina
Marisa Liz	Pedro Santos	Hélia Castro	Sónia Santos	~~Joana Lopes~~	~~Vera Feu~~	~~David Gomes~~
Marisa Liz	~~Alexandra Moita~~	~~Marcos Bessa~~	Fernando Adanjo	Diana Oliveira		
Mickael Carreira						
Mickael Carreira	Fernando Daniel	Sérgio Alves	Fausto Vasconcelos	Marcos Bessa	Vera Lima	Juliana Linharelhos
Mickael Carreira	Inês Hudson	Bruno Gomes	Ana, Flávia & Marta	~~Pedro Santos~~	Jaime & Nuno	Sophia Tavares
Mickael Carreira	Inês Mota	Filomena Mendes	Luís Cruz	Tamara Pereira		
Aurea						
Aurea	Francisco Murta	Jéssica Ângelo	David Gomes	Edna	Catarina Castanhas	Bertílio Santos
Aurea	Janette Lobo	Vera Feu	Tiago Baltazar	~~Sérgio Alves~~	~~Marisa Almeida~~	Inês Antunes
Aurea	Luísa Dantier	Teresa Mello	Salomé Silveira	Isis Melo	Vera Alvarenga	
Anselmo Ralph						
Anselmo Ralph	Marta Carvalho	Márcio Vicente	Cristina Afonso	Joana Lopes	Alexandra Moita	Laura Vargas
Anselmo Ralph	Natacha Amendoeira	Luís Batista	Raquel Monteiro	Tiago Sepúlveda	Lydie Carreira	Ana Rita Arez
Anselmo Ralph	Samuel Albuquerque	Inês Costa	Mariana Gonçalves	Symone de La Dragma		
Note: Italicized names are stolen artists. Underlined names were chosen by the public to come back for the Live Shows.

=== Season 5 (2017) ===
The fifth season of The Voice Portugal began in September 2017. All panelists from last season returned.

Coaching teams
Coaches	Artists				
Mickael Carreira					
Mickael Carreira	Inês Simões	Fábio Mouzinho	Simão Quintans	Salomé Caldeira	Carolina Martins
Mickael Carreira	Diogo Lima	Jéssica Meireles	Tiago Silva	~~Vanessa Coelho~~	João Miguel
Mickael Carreira	Fábio Gouveia	Inês & Jorge	Maria Luiza Ribeiro	Rosa Silva	Pedro Rafael
Marisa Liz					
Marisa Liz	Tomás Adrião	Tiago Nacarato	Ricardo Barroso	Ricardo Neiva	Afonso Teixeira
Marisa Liz	Cristiana Santos	Inês Barroso	Sofia Li	~~Frederico Madeira~~	Inês Viana
Marisa Liz	Fábio Vilas Boas	Filipa Paula	Laura Macedo	Margarida Marques	Margarida Martins
Aurea					
Aurea	Ana Paula Rada	Cláudia Pascoal	Joaquim Cabral	Diana Lucas	Bruna Moreira
Aurea	Catalina Borozan	Frederico Madeira	Pedro Seabra	~~Simão Quintans~~	Diana Macário
Aurea	Juliana Ignácio	Mariana Henriques	Paulo Gonçalves	Marlene Fernandes	Salvador Simão
Anselmo Ralph					
Anselmo Ralph	Kátia Moreira	Marta Pinto	Telma Domingues	Vanessa Coelho	Beatriz Felizardo
Anselmo Ralph	José Valente	Kaio Deodato	Laura Neves	~~Cristiana Santos~~	Maria Amaral
Anselmo Ralph	Mauro Silva	Bárbara Caria	Célia Lawson	Jorge Batista	Raquel Ribeiro
Note: Italicized names are stolen artists.

=== Season 6 (2018) ===
The sixth season of The Voice Portugal began in September 2018 with the same panelists as last season. In this season, there were five finalists, one per team and one voted by the public after being eliminated in the semi-final.

Coaching teams
Coaches	Artists				
Mickael Carreira					
Mickael Carreira	Gonçalo Lopes	Gabriel Gomes	Elsa Frias	Hugo Baptista	Salvador Simão
Mickael Carreira	Jaissa Nogueira	Inês Marcelino	Alicia Correia	~~Vanessa Monteiro~~	~~José Pestana~~
Mickael Carreira	Joana Brito Silva	João Branco	Francisca Gomes	Luna Costa	Rúben Pires
Aurea					
Aurea	Soraia Cardoso	João Palma	Márcia Trabulo	Leo	Pedro Camões
Aurea	Pedro Cau	Di Noise	Francisco Moreira	~~Hugo Baptista~~	Rita Coelho
Aurea	Beatriz Cassona	Ivo Arantes	Maria Damasceno	Anna Ermakova	Cristina Moreira
Marisa Liz					
Marisa Liz	Marvi	Diana Castro	Isaías Manhiça	Gonçalo Santos	David Dias
Marisa Liz	Tyler Faraday	Vanessa Monteiro	Marília Lopes	~~Francisco Moreira~~	Nicole Silva
Marisa Liz	Bruno Almeida	José Bonifácio	Carolina Leite	Sara Dominguez	Carlos Pereira
Anselmo Ralph					
Anselmo Ralph	Vânia Dilac	Joana Couto	Zé Maia Rodrigues	Nuel	Inês Ribeiro
Anselmo Ralph	João Pereira	Márcia Branco	Joana Carvalhas	José Pestana	Joana Lisboa
Anselmo Ralph	Eva Spitzer	Candy June	Bárbara Parreira	Filipa Faria	Catarina Mendes
Note: Italicized names are stolen artists. After the Knockouts, two artists came back, one chosen by the coach and the other by the public.

=== Season 7 (2019–2020) ===
The seventh season of The Voice Portugal began on 13 October 2019. Liz and Aurea remained as coaches, alongside debutants Diogo Piçarra and António Zambujo, who replaced Carreira and Ralph. From this season on, bands can participate. For the first time in the competition, the knockouts phase was live, instead of being pre-recorded, and included public voting.

Coaching teams
Coaches	Artists					
Diogo Piçarra						
Diogo Piçarra	Joana Alegre	Gabriel Silva	Pedro do Vale		Caroletta	Joana Oliveira
Diogo Piçarra	Diogo Machado	Ariana Abreu	Miguel Dias	Rita Rice	~~Gerson Santos~~	Marta & Fábio Costa
Diogo Piçarra	Flaviana Borges	Isaac Pimenta	Miguel Leite		Carolina Cardetas	Leandro Noronha
Marisa Liz						
Marisa Liz	Sebastião Oliveira	Francisco Sequeira	Filipa Maldonado		Marisa Oliveira	Gerson Santos
Marisa Liz	Projeto 65	Catarina Clau	Hugo Vasconcelos		~~Rita Rice~~	~~Vânia Blubird~~
Marisa Liz	Inês Lucas	Michele Mara	Little Mess		Joana Pereira	Michel William
António Zambujo						
António Zambujo	Rita Sanches	Carolina Pinto	Michael Cranmer		Matheus Paraízo	Serenela Duarte
António Zambujo	Sofia Grácio	Mário Nobre	BEH Trio		Leonor Líbano Monteiro	Joana Abreu
António Zambujo	Débora D'Oliveira	Margarida Andrade	Marisa Lopes		Rodolfo Figueiredo	Soraia Guerreiro
Aurea						
Aurea	Gabriel de Rose	Wesley Seme	Victor Estanga		Nuno Esperto	Vânia Blubird
Aurea	João Wilson	Vitória Leuca	Maria Novaes		~~Miguel Dias~~	~~BEH Trio~~
Aurea	Renata Ferraz	Joana Duarte	Sofia Melo		Júlia Ribeiro	Raquel Pompilho
Note: Italicized names are stolen artists.

=== Season 8 (2020–2021) ===
The eighth season of The Voice Portugal began on 27 September 2020. Liz, Aurea, Piçarra, and Zambujo remained as coaches. For the first time in the competition, in the battles phase, each artist sang a different song instead of singing one together, due to the procedures of the COVID-19 pandemic in Portugal. This season marks the first stolen artist to win The Voice Portugal.

Coaching teams
Coaches	Artists				
Aurea					
Aurea	Tiago Barbosa	Miguel & João	Catarina Archer	Nelson Sousa	Alicia Camps
Aurea	Rita Laranjeira	Filipa Canhão	Beatriz Costa	Natacha Oliveira	Rodrigo Marques
Aurea	Beatriz Carvalho	Renata Marinho	Tatiana Oliveira	Bruno Almeida	António Alves
Diogo Piçarra					
Diogo Piçarra	Diogo Leite	Jéssica Ângelo	Gonçalo Bilé	Kevin Lopes	Paloma & Jorginho
Diogo Piçarra	Catarina Pereira	Lázaro Menino	Ricardo Bento	Tiago Braga	~~Tiago Barbosa~~
Diogo Piçarra	Sebastião Burnay	Twiin	Isabel Leite	Adriana Fernandes	Tiago Teixeira Barbosa
Marisa Liz					
Marisa Liz	Luís Trigacheiro	Luciana & Pri	João Amaral	Rafaela Monteiro	Susana Costa
Marisa Liz	Favela Lacroix	Carina Leitão	Laura Varges	Sara Leite	~~Íris Silva~~
Marisa Liz	Joelisa	Ema Monteiro	Filipe Santos	Gabriel Leo	Cláudia Brito
António Zambujo					
António Zambujo	Tiago Silva	Mariana Rebelo	Mari Segura	Íris Silva	Maria Casal Ribeiro
António Zambujo	Francisco Vicente	Patrícia Pratas	Talita Cayolla	Márcio Gonçalves	~~Tiago Braga~~
António Zambujo	~~Luís Trigacheiro~~	Cheila Teixeira	Kiara Timas	Paulo Andrade	Andor Violeta
Note: Italicized names are stolen artists. Underlined names received a Wildcard from their coaches and came back to the Live Knockouts.

=== Season 9 (2021–2022) ===
The ninth season of The Voice Portugal began on 17 October 2021. Aurea, Liz, Piçarra, and Zambujo remained as coaches.

Coaching teams
Coaches	Artists					
Marisa Liz						
Marisa Liz	João Leote		João Neves	Inês Marques Lucas	Miguel Dias	Inês Martins
Marisa Liz	Pedro Tavares		Diana Gil	Juliana Oliveira	Marta Lys	~~Edmundo Inácio~~
Marisa Liz	Antonina	Lika	Andreia Rio	Maria Mendonça	Mariana Barnabé	Rita Raposo
António Zambujo						
António Zambujo	Rodrigo Lourenço		Maria Inês Graça	Beatriz Cepeda	Rui Taipa	Márcio Gonçalves
António Zambujo	Rita Medeiros		Maria Pereira	Fernando Leal	João Tinoco	~~Sara Badalo~~
António Zambujo	Ava Vahneshan		Clara Martinez	Daniel Cerca	Maria João Jones	Maria Pia Soutinho
Aurea						
Aurea	Mariana Rocha		Francisca Oliveira	Huca	Rui Pedro	Matilde Jacob
Aurea	Sara Badalo		Beatriz Lopes	Fred Marques	Ika	Daniel Luz
Aurea	Edson Daniel		Maria Teresa Passão	Mariana Silva	Sara & Tiago	Tiago Ribeiro
Diogo Piçarra						
Diogo Piçarra	Daniel Fernandes		Edmundo Inácio	Aliança Velha	Matheus Alcântara	Francisca Rocha
Diogo Piçarra	Lusitana		João Vieira	António Gameiro	Flávio Soares	~~Inês Marques Lucas~~
Diogo Piçarra	~~Márcio Gonçalves~~		Arpen	Cláudio Pereira	Maria Pires	Sofia Costa
Note: Italicized names are stolen artists. Underlined names are artists named to come back for a Four-way knockout.

=== Season 10 (2022–2023) ===
The tenth season of The Voice Portugal began recording on 5 September, with the confirmation that Liz and Piçarra would return as coaches, while Aurea and Zambujo were replaced by The Voice Kids coach Carolina Deslandes and new coach Dino D'Santiago. The season began airing on 25 September 2022.

This season introduced a new dynamic to the battles. Each coach could decide to do battles in pairs or groups, and the only rule was they needed to keep seven artists on their teams; hence, a battle could have one, many, or no one as winner. Apart from that, the steals were removed.

To replace the knockouts round, a new phase, called "Cross battles", was established. An artist of one team competes against an artist of another team, and the viewers' votes decide the winner of the battle. At the end of the round, each coach saved one eliminated artist from their own team.

The dynamic of the lives shows also changed this season. Starting in the fourth live show (when the Top 10 artists remain in contest), the decision of who passes through to the next episode is solely of the public; that means the artists who receive the most votes, regardless of team, advance to the next episode. This means that, for the first time ever in The Voice Portugal, a coach could have not had their team represented in the finale, which eventually did not happen. Also, contrary to the previous four seasons, there were only four finalists.

Coaching teams
Coaches	Artists				
Marisa Liz					
Marisa Liz	Gustavo Reinas	Rúben Torres	João Ribeiro	António Ataíde	Jorge Cruz
Marisa Liz	Maria Inês Gonçalves	Ricardo Dias	Alícia Barros	Cláudio Braga	Daniel Vargas
Marisa Liz	Diogo Carvalho	Michel Lopes	Pedro Lunet	Sherley Paredes	
Dino d'Santiago					
Dino d'Santiago	Coastel	Soraia Morais	Diogo Carapinha	Vincente Augusto	Lourenço Ataíde
Dino d'Santiago	Fernanda de Lima	Joana Homem de Sá	Aline Abbadia	Diogo Madeira	Fábio Leitão
Dino d'Santiago	Khira	Miguel Bandeirinha	Rute Lopes	Victoria Shpak	
Diogo Piçarra					
Diogo Piçarra	Rebeca Reinaldo	Wander Isaac	Isaac Costa	Clara de Gail	Gaby Araújo
Diogo Piçarra	Good Habits	Matilde Leite	Bibash Upreti	Bruna Guerreiro	Carolina Brandão
Diogo Piçarra	Catarina Lameira	Diana Costa	Luís Barbosa	Triova Voices	
Carolina Deslandes					
Carolina Deslandes	Paulo Lapa	Sasha Silva	Beatriz Santos	Margarida & Tomás	Francisco Barata
Carolina Deslandes	Alexandre Martins	Pilmaiquén Jenny	Alícia Rosa	Ana Rita Conceição	Annie Pereira
Carolina Deslandes	Diogo Freitas	Filipe Carriço	Luísa Vidal	Manuel Ortigoso	
Note: Underlined names are artists saved by their coach during the Live Cross Battles.

=== Season 11 (2023–2024) ===
Applications for the eleventh season of The Voice Portugal opened in May 2023 and the blind auditions' recording began on 10 July. The same day, it was confirmed that Zambujo would return as coach after a one-season hiatus, along with The Voice Kids coach Fernando Daniel, The Voice Gerações coach Sara Correia, and debutant Sónia Tavares. The season began airing on 17 September 2023.

=== Season 12 (2024–2025) ===
On 19 June 2024, it was confirmed that Daniel, Tavares, and Correia would return as coaches for the twelfth season. In the meantime, Zambujo was replaced by The Voice Kids coach Nininho Vaz Maia. The same day, filming began for the blind auditions. The season began airing on 22 September 2024.

=== Season 13 (2025–2026) ===
On 25 July 2025, it was confirmed that Daniel, Tavares, and Correia would return as coaches for the thirteenth season, while Vaz Maia was replaced by the second coaching duo in the franchise's history, Calema. The season began airing on 21 September 2025.

=== Season 14 (2026–2027) ===
On 23 July 2026, it was confirmed that Daniel and Tavares would return as coaches for the fourteenth season, while Calema was replaced by the third coaching duo in the franchise's history, returning coach Mickael Carreira and his brother David Carreira. Correia was replaced by season 5 semifinalist Cláudia Pascoal, who become the second former artist from the show to become a coach, after Daniel. The season began airing on 11 October 2026.

== Ratings ==
The Voice Portugal : Viewers per episode (thousands)

Season	Episode number																
Season	1	2	3	4	5	6	7	8	9	10	11	12	13	14	15	16	17
2 (2014)	1143	1087	1184	922	1102	893	1054	850	864	864	884	1195	789	807	–		
3 (2015-16)	1170	1225	1188	1140	1112	1093	1074	1036	1007	1112	1035	1045	998	1236	–		
4 (2016)	836	1055	1178	1140	1131	1397	1225	1169	1083	1083	1188	1159	1073	1150	998	931	810
5 (2017)	1075	1024	997	893	995	TBD	978	978	1031	912	881	986	919	838	889.5	709	–
6 (2018)	817	TBD	TBD	941	928	788	822	677	885	788	760	667	TBD	TBD	TBD	838	–
7 (2019-20)	867	936	820	884	815	954	920	659	680	715	634	740	707	TBD	TBD	–	

Season	Timeslot	# Ep.	Premiere			Final			Ref.
Season	Timeslot	# Ep.	Date	Ratings (Share)	Viewers in millions	Date	Ratings (Share)	Viewers in millions	Ref.
1	Saturdays at 10pm	18	19 October 2011	7,8% (23,7% share)		25 February 2012	7,0% (22,1% share)		
2	Sundays at 9pm	17	30 March 2014	11,8% (21,8% share)	1.12	27 July 2014	8,5% (20,5% share)	0.81	
3	Sundays at 9pm	14	11 October 2015	12.1% (24,6% share)	1.15	10 January 2016	13,0% (27,2% share)	1.24	
4	Sundays at 9pm	17	4 September 2016	8,8% (20,1% share)	0.84	25 December 2016	8,8% (22,6% share)	0.81	
5	Sundays at 9pm	15	10 September 2017	11,1% (24,0% share)		23 December 2017	11,1% (24,0% share)	0.71	
6	Sundays at 9pm	15	23 September 2018	8,4% (18,5% share)		30 December 2018		0.84	
7	Sundays at 9pm	14	13 October 2019	9,2% (18,1% share)	0.86	12 January 2020	9,7% (19,8% share)	0.76	
8	Sundays at 9pm	15	27 September 2020	8,7% (17,5% share)	0.82	3 January 2021	9,0% (19,1% share)	0.84	
9	Sundays at 9.15pm	15	17 October 2021	9,2% (19,9% share)	0.87	6 February 2022	6,5% (15,3% share)	0.62	
10	Sundays at 9.15pm	17	25 September 2022	6,8% (15,5% share)	0.64	22 January 2023	6,9% (16,8% share)	0.65	
11	Sundays at 9.15pm	15	17 September 2023	6,8% (15,1% share)		7 January 2024	5,7% (13,7% share)		

== The Voice Gerações ==
In 2022, it was announced that RTP1 would broadcast a new spin-off version of The Voice Portugal, called The Voice Gerações. The intention of this version is to have family or friend groups, consisting of singers of all ages, competing.

=== Gallery ===
Coaches gallery

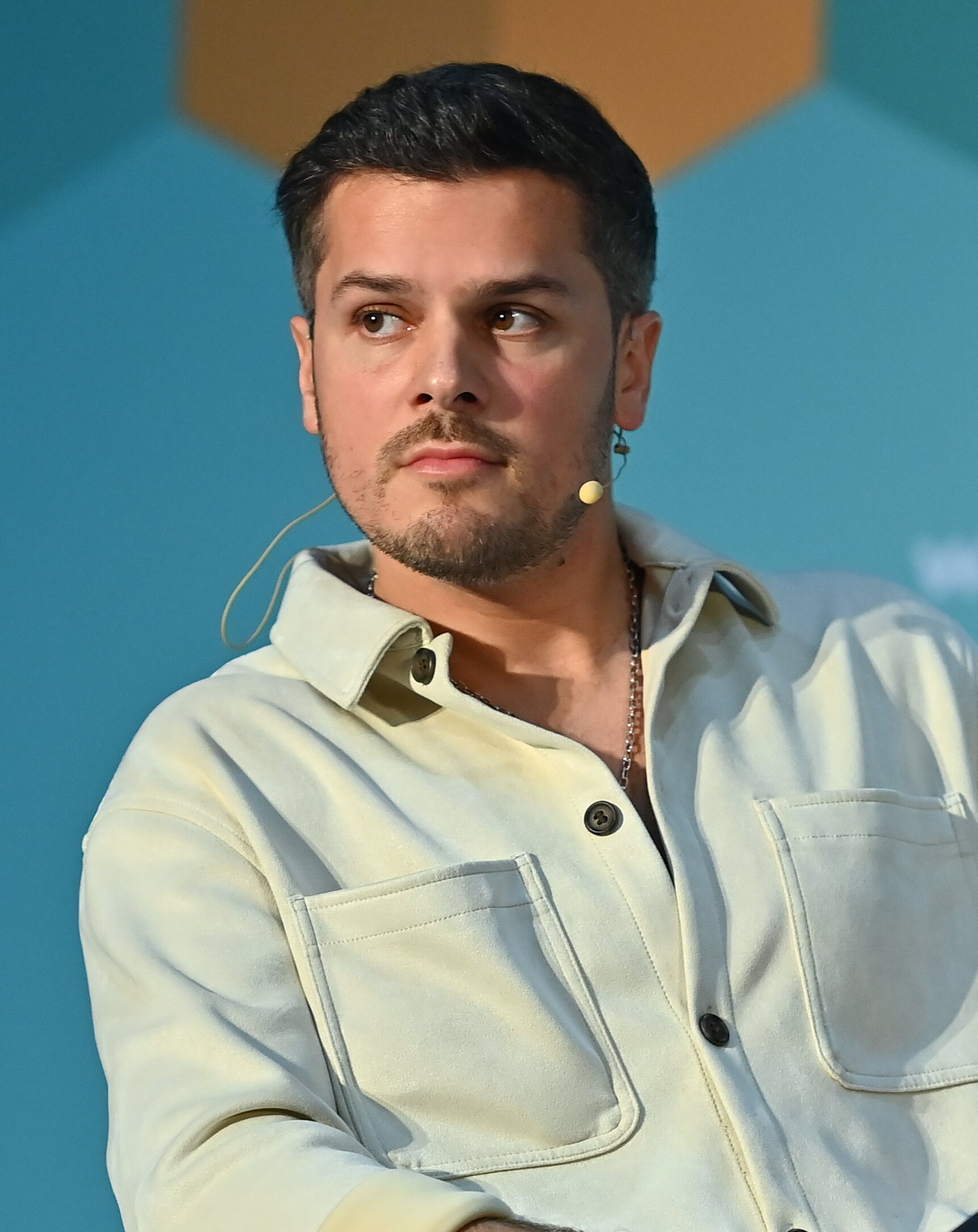
Mickael Carreira (1–present)

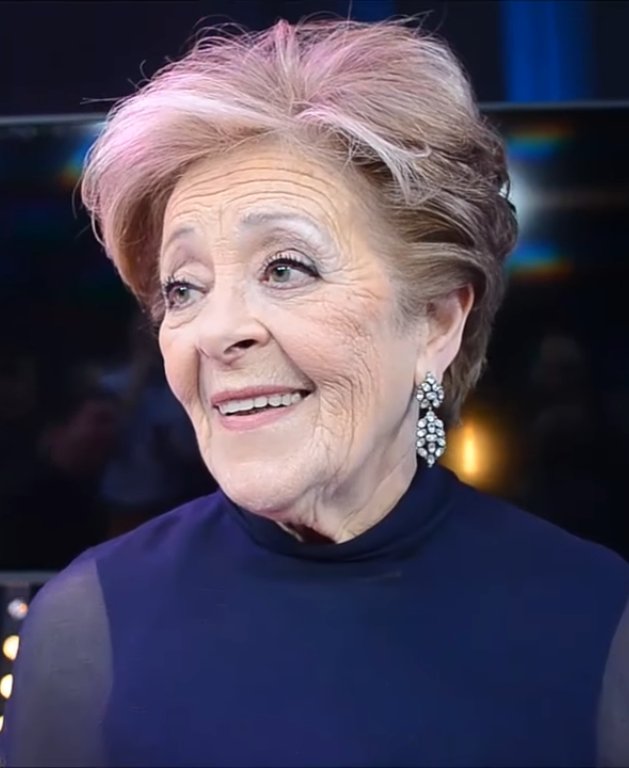
Simone de Oliveira (1–2)

Bárbara Bandeira (1)

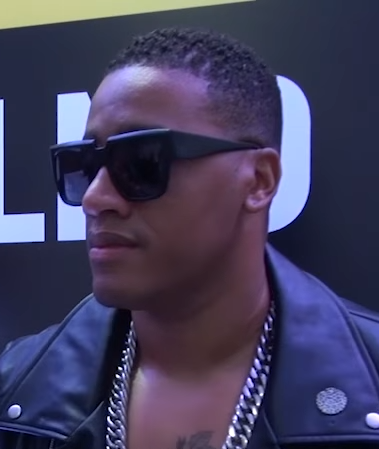
Anselmo Ralph (1–present)

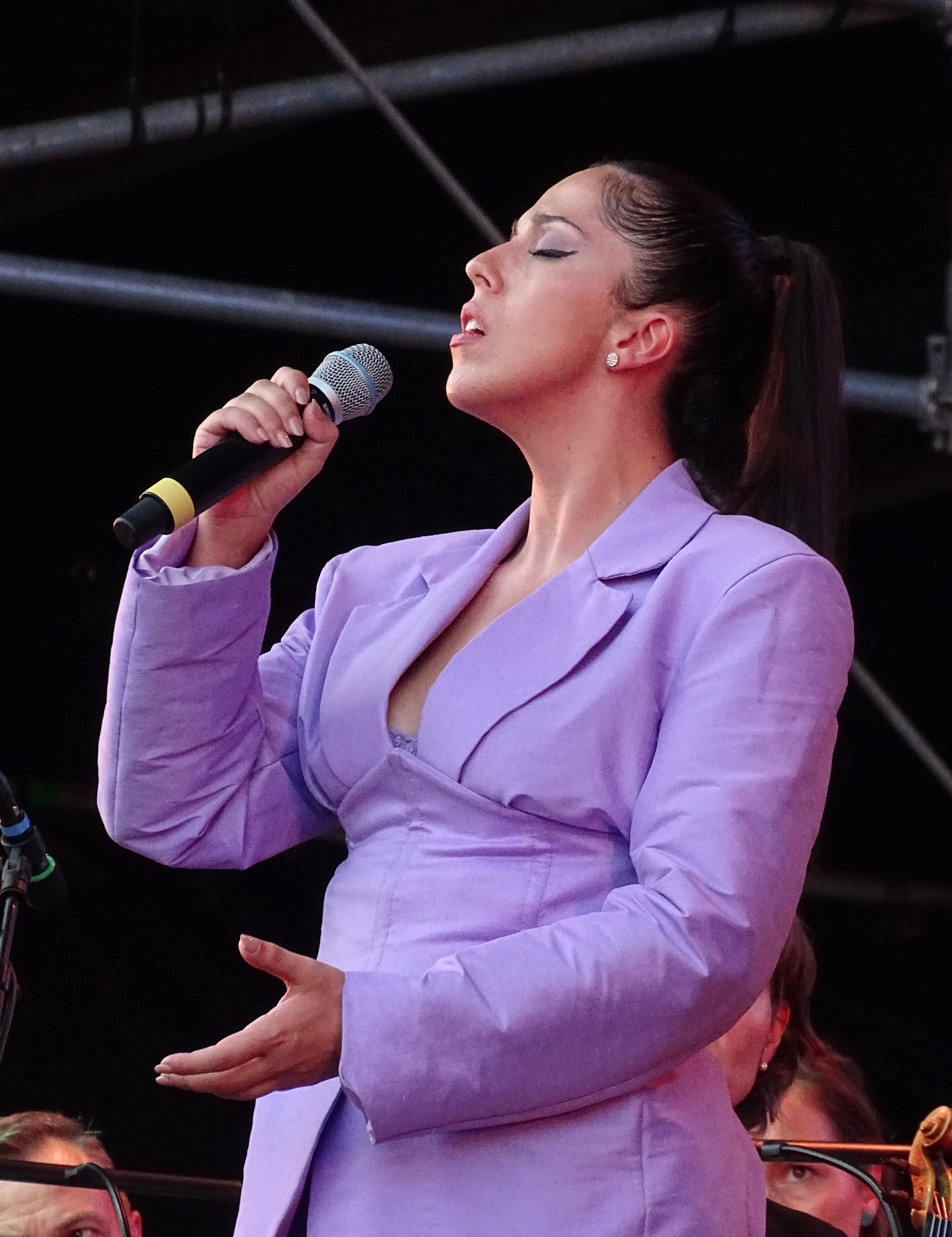
Sara Correia (2)

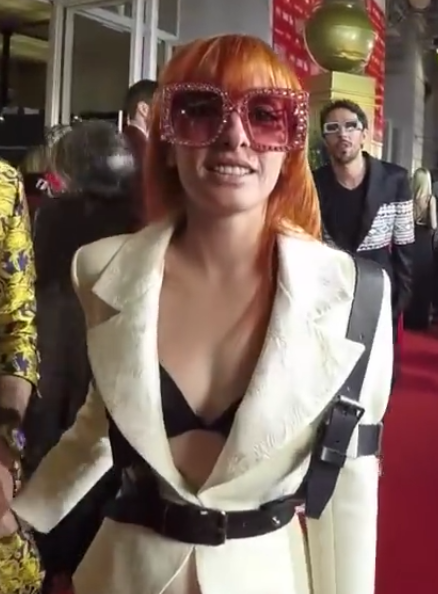
Marisa Liz (3–present)

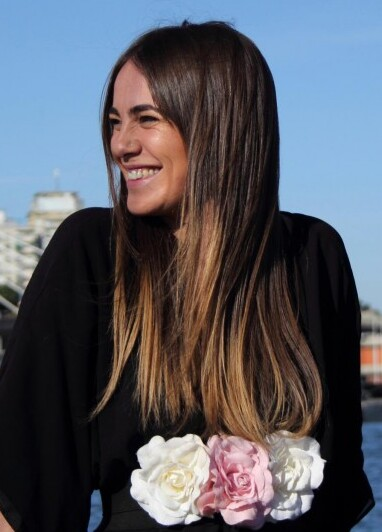
Gisela João (3–present)

=== Coaches ===
Coaches' line-up by chairs order
Season	Year	Coaches and respective key colors			
Season	Year	1	2	3	4
1	2022	Mickael	Simone	Bárbara	Anselmo
2	2023	Mickael	Simone	Sara	Anselmo
3	2025	Mickael	Marisa	Gisela	Anselmo
4	2026	Marisa	Mickael	Gisela	Anselmo

=== Series overview ===
The Voice Gerações series overview
Season	Year	Winner	Finalists				Winning coach	Presenters
1	2022	Rodrigo & Teresa	Os Vocalistas	Anna & Riana	Cristiana & Sónia	Família Grilo	Anselmo Ralph	Catarina Furtado, Vasco Palmeirim
2	2023	Todagente	Azinhaga	Os Vouginhas	FigoMaduro	Grupo Pioneiros	Anselmo Ralph	Catarina Furtado, Vasco Palmeirim
3	2025	D'Anto	Falta Um	Raquel, Olinda & Margarida	Cândido & Pedro	—N/a	Gisela João	Catarina Furtado
4	2026	Os En'Canta Modas	Hey T	Rumo Certo	Mizaela & Linne	—N/a	Marisa Liz	Catarina Furtado

=== Seasons' synopses ===
Color key
Winner
Runner-up
Third place
Eliminated in the Live shows

==== Season 1 (2022) ====
On 3 July 2022, the coaches for this version were announced to be Carreira, Ralph, Bárbara Bandeira and Simone de Oliveira. The first series was won by Rodrigo & Teresa from Team Anselmo.

Coaching teams
Coaches	Groups		
Mickael Carreira			
Mickael Carreira	Cristiana & Sónia	Gonçalo & Beatriz	
Simone de Oliveira			
Simone de Oliveira	Os Vocalistas	Família Grilo	Lúdica Música!
Bárbara Bandeira			
Bárbara Bandeira	Anna & Riana	Família Rotilo	
Anselmo Ralph			
Anselmo Ralph	Rodrigo & Teresa	Família Chaveiro	

==== Season 2 (2023) ====
In April 2023, it was announced in the official Instagram page of the program that The Voice Gerações would return for a second season. On 4 June, it was announced, during a live episode of The Voice Kids season four, that Sara Correia would replace Bandeira as a coach, while Carreira, Oliveira, and Ralph would remain as coaches. Additionally, unlike the first season, the "block" buttons would be featured in this season. Presented by Furtado and Palmeirim, and Catarina Maia in the backstage, the season began on 2 July. Three episodes later, on 23 July, Todagente from Team Anselmo won the competition. With Ralph's win, he became the third coach, behind Marisa Liz and Fernando Daniel, to win three times within all versions of the show.

Coaching teams
Coaches	Groups		
Mickael Carreira			
Mickael Carreira	Azinhaga	FigoMaduro	Os Herlanders
Simone de Oliveira			
Simone de Oliveira	Os Vouginhas	Gerson, Madalena & Maria	Inês, Érica & Nicole
Sara Correia			
Sara Correia	Grupo Pioneiros	Lara & Rafaela	Irina & Soraia
Anselmo Ralph			
Anselmo Ralph	Todagente	Irina, Maria Inês & Núria	Daniel & Catarina

==== Season 3 (2025) ====
In March 2025, it was announced that of the coaches from the second season, only Carreira and Ralph would return. At the same time, Liz was announced to join the panel along with debuting coach Gisela João. The season premiered on 20 July with Furtado as the host and Maria Petronilho as the backstage host. On 24 August, D'Anto from Team Gisela won the competition, marking Gisela João's first win as a coach. With D'Anto's win, João became the sixth coach on all variations of the Portuguese versions of The Voice to win on his/her debut season following Ralph, Zambujo, Daniel, Vaz Maia, and Miguel Cristovinho (with the latter three doing so on the kids version); however, João became the first female coach in the show's history to accomplish this.

==== Season 4 (2026) ====
In June 2026, it was announced that Carreira, Ralph, Liz, and João would all return for the fourth season. The season premiered on 12 July with Furtado and Petronilho remaining as the host and backstage host, respectively. On 20 September, Os En'Canta Modas from Team Marisa won the competition, marking Marisa Liz's first win on The Voice Gerações. However, with Liz's four wins on the main version of this show, she expanded her status as the most winning coach on all variations of The Voice Portugal, with five wins total.
