= Os Anjos =

Os Anjos are a Portuguese musical duo. Formed in 1999 by brothers Sérgio and Nelson Rosado, the duo primarily makes music in the pop rock genre. Os Anjos were one of the most successful Portuguese musical groups of the late 1990s and the 2000s.

== Early life ==
Nelson Rosado and Sérgio Rosado were born in 1976 and 1980, respectively, in Margem Sul. From an early age, they both desired to become musicians.

In 1996, they participated in the program Lugar aos Mais Novos, of Rádio Renascença, from which winners come out.

The following year they participated in RTP's Casa de Artistas program, getting first place in it. That same year, 1997, they join the group Sétimo Céu, which, despite some successes, ended in 1998.

== Career as duo ==
The duo was formed in 1999, at the invitation of a national producer, emerging with a new designation, "Anjos", derived from the name that their grandmother called them as children, "angels". The same year, the album Ficarei was released, from which the hits "Ficarei" and "Perdoa" are extracted. On Christmas 1999, a new edition was released that contains the Christmas song "Nesta Noite Branca", with singer Suzy. In 2001, they released the album Espelho. The duo then recorded the first career DVD, which gave rise to the album Tour Viver. In 2005, after a break from recording, they released the album Alma, which includes the hit "A Vida faz-me Bem".

In 2007, and at the invitation of Teresa Guilherme, they recorded the theme of the soap opera Vingança, and later the remaining nine themes of this soap opera, giving rise to the album Vingança. Following this successful partnership, they were invited by the channel to be part of the jury board of the Família Superstar program (2007).

In 2009, Os Anjos released the album Virar A Página, where they have the collaboration of Serginho Moah, singer of the Brazilian band Papas da Língua.

In 2011, they were featured as coaches on the first season of the reality competition show A Voz de Portugal, now known as The Voice Portugal. In 2012 they recorded the album Anjos Acústico. In 2017 they released the album Longe. The following year, in 2018, they released a new single, entitled "Eterno". The duo was the headliner in September 2019 at the Never ending summer event in Albufeira, along with the band Iris.

== Legal action ==
In July 2024, it was reported that Os Anjos had sued the comedian Joana Marques, demanding one million and 118 thousand euros, because, on April 25, 2022, the comedian shared on her Instagram page a montage that mocks the interpretation of the Portuguese national anthem by the duo at the Algarve International Circuit, which had happened the day before. In the assembly, the interpretation of Os Anjos is interspersed with facial expressions of displeasure by the four jurors of the 7th edition of Ídolos, including Marques herself. Nelson Rosado said that Marques' publication had a "highly damaging impact". At the previous hearing, no agreement was reached, and the three parties proceeded to trial. Due to the fact that the legal process has further drawn the attention of the general public to the aforementioned video, this case is given as an example of the Streisand effect. In October 2025, Marques was acquitted from all charges brought against her by Os Anjos.

== Discography ==
- 1999 - Ficarei
- 2000 - Ficarei - Ao Vivo
- 2001 - Espelho
- 2002 - Tour Viver
- 2003 - Segr3dos
- 2005 - Alma
- 2007 - Vingança
- 2009 - Virar A Página
- 2012 - Anjos Acústico
- 2017 - Longe
- 2018 - Eterno
- 2021 - Ao Vivo no Campo Pequeno
- 2022 - Estrelas de Natal
