= Natasha Semmynova =

Portuguese drag performer

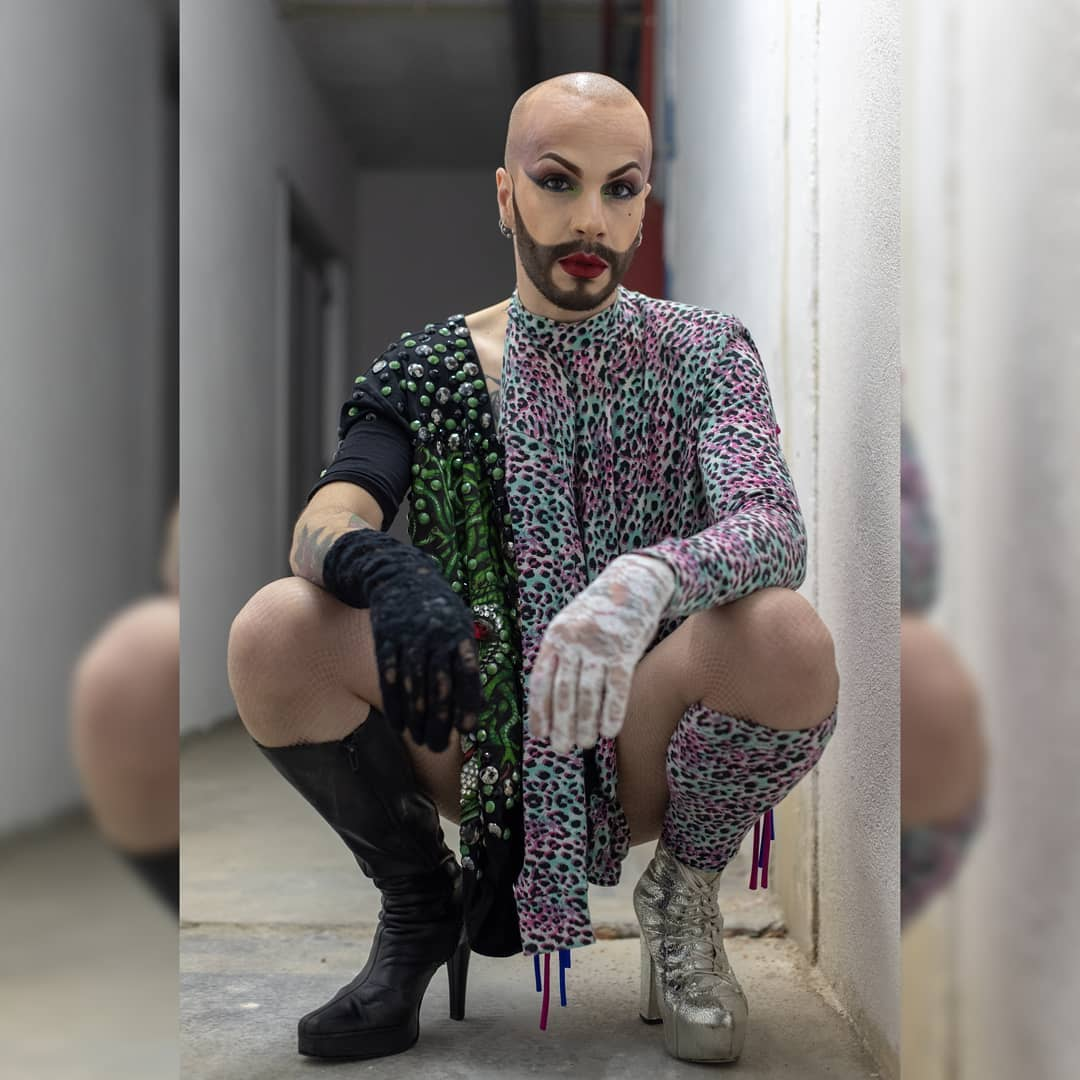
- Natasha Semmynova in 2019
- Born: Vítor José da Silva Fernandes; April 5, 1980
- Died: July 15, 2021 (aged 41)
- Occupations: Drag queen; Singer; Makeup artist
- Years active: 1999–2021
- Known for: The Voice Portugal

Vítor José da Silva Fernandes (5 April 1980 – 15 July 2021), best known by his stage name Natasha Semmynova, was a Portuguese drag queen, singer, and makeup artist. Emerging in the late 1990s, Fernandes became a central figure in Porto's drag scene and helped shape LGBTQ+ nightlife and culture in Portugal. Known for his androgynous style and emotive performances, he captivated national audiences on The Voice Portugal in 2015 with his rendition of Radiohead’s "Creep".

== Early life and background ==
He was born to Maria da Conceição Fernandes in 1980 and had an older sister. In Fácil de Entender, a documentary from 2007, his sister discussed how she would dress him up as a girl in his infancy, when they played together.

Music was an important part of Fernandes' life from a young age. At 14, he became an avid fan of The Cranberries, often being told that he sounded similar to lead singer Dolores O'Riordan. He also admired artists like Garbage, Alanis Morissette, and Sónia Tavares from the Portuguese band The Gift. From 2002 to 2006, he studied at Paredes’ music academy.

In the summer of 1999, Fernandes came out as gay to his friends and acquaintances and held his first drag performance. However, he only came out later to his parents. They started questioning Fernandes' identity after he started bringing home clothing and accessories from his performances, under the guise of them being theater costumes. While at first they expressed confusion, over time they understood the difference between homosexuality and transexuality and supported Fernandes in his career.

Alongside his drag performances, Fernandes developed a career as a professional freelance makeup artist, a skill that complemented his artistry and became a valued part of his creative identity.

== Career ==
=== Formation of Natasha Semmynova ===
The character of Natasha Semmynova was created by Vítor Fernandes in August 1999, receiving his drag name half a year later. He was persuaded to perform by his friends, due to his dancing and he gave his first performance at Gente Gira, a gay bar in Porto, performing a song by Shania Twain. He described his early years as an exploration of the unknown, where over time he created a character which would interpret songs by both male and female artists.

The drag name of Natasha Semmynova is a spelling variation of Natacha Semmynova, a Russian spy character in Herman José's show Casino Royal. The character of Natacha is present throughout the entire series and is played by the actress São José Lapa.

Natasha Semmynova was an androgynous figure, typically performing with a beard, corsets, and without wigs or breastplates. Fernandes prioritized performance and makeup over costumes, distinguishing himself from the more traditional drag style known in Portugal as Transformismo. He did not fully embrace the term drag queen, instead, preferring to be called a drag performer.

=== Porto's nightlife and drag scene ===
Fernandes was a central figure in Porto's drag scene, especially in Porto Pride, an annual event held at the Sá da Bandeira Theater from 2002 to 2012. Throughout his career, Fernandes performed in several queer bars in Porto, such as Gente Gira, Boys’R’Us, Moinho de Vento, Café Lusitano, Pride Bar and HIM/Syndicato. Since 2015 he organized, hosted and participated in drag festivals, such as Porto's International Transformismo Festival and Porto Drag Fest.

=== Breakthrough on The Voice Portugal ===
Fernandes appeared as Natasha Semmynova on the third season of The Voice Portugal in 2015, where his rendition of Radiohead's "Creep" captivated audiences and led all four judges to turn their chairs. He ultimately selected Marisa Liz as his mentor. This performance by Vítor Fernandes sparked considerable discussion on social media and television and it likely is his most famous performance. Fernandes was eliminated on episode 8 in a battle to "Your Song" by Elton John.

Prior to participating in The Voice Portugal, Fernandes did not have a musical career, and he hoped that the show would push him out of his comfort zone. A year prior, when he was acting the stage play Longe do Corpo, Fernandes developed an interest for singing live. He believed that he did not possess an outstanding voice and he saw his strengths in his vocal technique, experience, comfort and different image.

=== Theater and stage work ===
In 2006, Fernandes joined a Portuguese production of the musical RENT, marking one of his earliest forays into theater. In 2014, he played a prominent role in Longe do Corpo (Far from the Body), a play by Mundo Razoável that delved into themes of transsexuality and gender identity. Written and directed by Marta Freitas, the play featured Fernandes as his drag persona, Natasha Semmynova, combining humor with musical performances to explore complex topics related to transitioning.

Longe do Corpo premiered at the Municipal Theater Constantino Nery in Matosinhos and later toured to venues in Famalicão and Almada. In the Almada production, the performance began at the theater entrance with a drag act by Fernandes, setting the tone for the play's exploration of identity.

Following his work in Longe do Corpo, Fernandes appeared in sessions of Quintas de Leitura at Porto's Municipal Theater.

== Activism and advocacy ==
Throughout his career, Fernandes actively sought to educate the public on drag culture, describing how he identified as a man while Natasha was a character for the stage. He publicly spoke out in support of trans people, lamenting in particular the death of Gisberta Salce Júnior.

Fernandes also spoke of matters such as HIV and Chemsex, participating in social media campaigns and the annual gala of the association Abraço.

== Death ==
The COVID-19 pandemic forced the closure of bars and clubs in Portugal, leaving Fernandes unable to perform or work as a makeup artist. During this time, he battled advanced lung cancer, awaiting approval for medical leave. In April 2021, he turned to social media requesting financial aid to pay personal and medical bills. He died on 15 June 2021 and his funeral was held in a chapel by Igreja de Nossa Senhora do Ó de Águas Santas.

Fernandes' death was mourned by those in his life and community. Porto's Municipal Assembly expressed their condolences for his death, highlighting his long career in Porto's nightlife, his drag artistry and his expression of personal freedom. Marisa Liz, his mentor in The Voice Portugal, also expressed her sadness at his passing.

== Awards and recognitions ==
The queer newspaper Dezanove awarded Natasha Semmynova the ‘Newcomer of the Year’ in 2015 and ‘Personality of the Year’ in 2021.

== Legacy and influence ==
The sixteenth Porto Pride parade honored Fernandes and Natasha Semmynova on 3 July 2021, just after his death. The collective Feminino Sobre Rodas carried a banner bearing a photo of the artist and his tattooed phrase, "We will never walk alone".

On 4 July 2021, the eleventh edition of Porto Drag Festival was held in Vítor Fernandes' honor. Fernandes had previously been the event's artistic director and host, before the start of the COVID-19 pandemic. The event, previously held in a queer bar in Porto, was held instead in the Sá da Bandeira Theater, as promised to Fernandes during his fight with cancer. The show was attended by hundreds of visitors, including Fernandes' sister, and it was started off displaying images of Natasha Semmynova and the message "We will never walk alone" It was followed by performances from the artists Agatha Top, Big Mama, Dyanne Star, Elektra Asford, Jessica Top, Kara Kills, Kim Foz, Lilly Prozac, Morgana, Ricardo Madonna, Wanda Morelly and Yra Top. It included a speech from his friend João Paulo, the director of Portugal Gay and it was closed off by a joint dance of all performers to "Dancing Queen" by ABBA.
