= Diana Lucas =

Portuguese singer (born 1986)

- Also known as: Diana
- Born: Diana Lucas; 6 December 1986 (age 38)
- Origin: Alenquer, Portugal
- Genres: Pop, R&B
- Occupation: Singer
- Years active: 1995–present

Diana Lucas (born 6 December 1986 in Alenquer, near Lisbon, Portugal) is a Portuguese singer. She was active as a singer from the late 90s to the late 2000s. After taking a break from her music career, she came back in 2015, with two covers of songs known worldwide on her YouTube channel. Afterwards, she participated in the season 5 of The Voice Portugal and was eventually eliminated on the live shows. Diana Lucas is the sister of Ivo Lucas.

== Biography ==
In 1996, when Diana was only 9 years old, she won the Portuguese version of the Italian TV show Bravo Bravíssimo and represented Portugal in the finale, in Italy.

In 2003, when she 16 years old, Diana participated in the first edition of the Portuguese version of the music TV show American Idol, called Ídolos, finishing in 11th place.

In 2006, her 2nd album, "Diana", was released. By that time her artist name was only "Diana".

In 2008 Diana released her 3rd album, Pontas Soltas, which contains the hit single "Desculpa Lá". In December 2017, "Desculpa Lá" music video had almost 3.5 million views on YouTube. The song also appeared in the Morangos com Açucar soundtrack, being one of the most played and adored by her fans.

== Discography ==
Album information
Um Cantinho do Céu
- Released: 1998
- Chart positions: -
Diana
- Released: 2006
- Chart positions: -
- Production: Boss AC, Gutto
- Genre: R&B
- Label: Farol Música
Pontas Soltas
- Released: September 2008
- Chart positions: -

== Television ==
Year	Title	Role	Other notes
2005	Bravo Bravíssimo	Diana Lucas	Herself
2006	Morangos com Açucar	Diana Lucas	Herself
