= Maria Vitória =

East Timorese singer (born 2001)

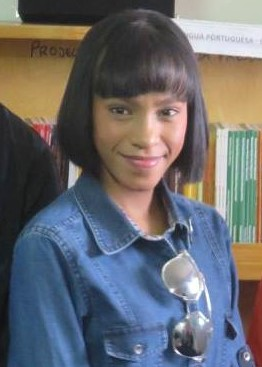
- Vitória in January 2017

Background information
- Also known as: Marvi
- Born: Maria Vitória da Costa Borges; 11 February 2001 (age 24); Dili, East Timor
- Genres: Pop
- Occupation: Singer
- Instrument: Vocals
- Years active: 2007-present

Maria Vitória da Costa Borges (born 11 February 2001), known professionally as Maria Vitória and Marvi, is an East Timorese pop singer. She won the sixth season of The Voice Portugal in 2018.

== Early life ==
Maria Vitória da Costa Borges was born in Dili on 11 February 2001. Her family comes from Soibada and she has three brothers and a sister. Her father works for the church. The family came to Dili to sell water spinach (kanko), which they grew themselves. From the age of eight, Vitória sold the spinach in the markets of Taibesi and Maloa. During the 2006 crisis in Timor-Leste, the family had to flee their home in Aitarac Laran and seek refuge in a tent in Motael.

In 2007, Vitória attended primary school in Hudilaran. Because of her appearance and poverty, she was the victim of bullying throughout her ten years of schooling, even after transferring to the Escola Cristal in Balide and the Escola São Pedro in Comoro.

== Musical career ==
=== 2007–2017: Early career ===
Also in 2007, Vitória also took part in singing competitions, winning first place for the first time in 2009. One grandfather gave her a cassette recorder with a radio to practice on, and the other later gave her a small television with a DVD player. When her older sister went to university, Vitória was allowed to use her laptop. The recorded songs were saved on the computer, as Vitória was not even familiar with YouTube or Facebook. Through her sister, she also learned songs by various national and foreign singers who influenced Vitória.

After a second victory at the Youth Super Star in Dili in 2016, Vitória was allowed to represent East Timor in the second season of the Indonesian singing talent show D'Academy Asia (DAA2). Six candidates from six Southeast Asian countries took part in the competition. The D stands for the musical genre Dangdut. Although this Indonesian pop music is very popular in East Timor, there have been no East Timorese performers to date. Vitória finished in fourth place behind three Indonesians.

Vitória's success led to her high popularity in East Timor. Upon her return to East Timor on 5 January 2017, Vitória was celebrated in a motorcade. 12,000 people welcomed her. Deputy Minister of Education Dulce Soares, on behalf of the East Timorese government, promised her support for her further education if she so desired. In her speech, Vitória thanked President Taur Matan Ruak and former Prime Minister Xanana Gusmão for their support so far. Representative Francisco Miranda Branco called Vitória an East Timorese ambassador of dangdut. She was also called the "Pearl of East Timor." The Ministry of Health supported Vitória's mother for treatment of breast cancer in an Indonesian hospital. However, she died of cancer in 2020.

=== 2018–2021: The Voice Portugal ===
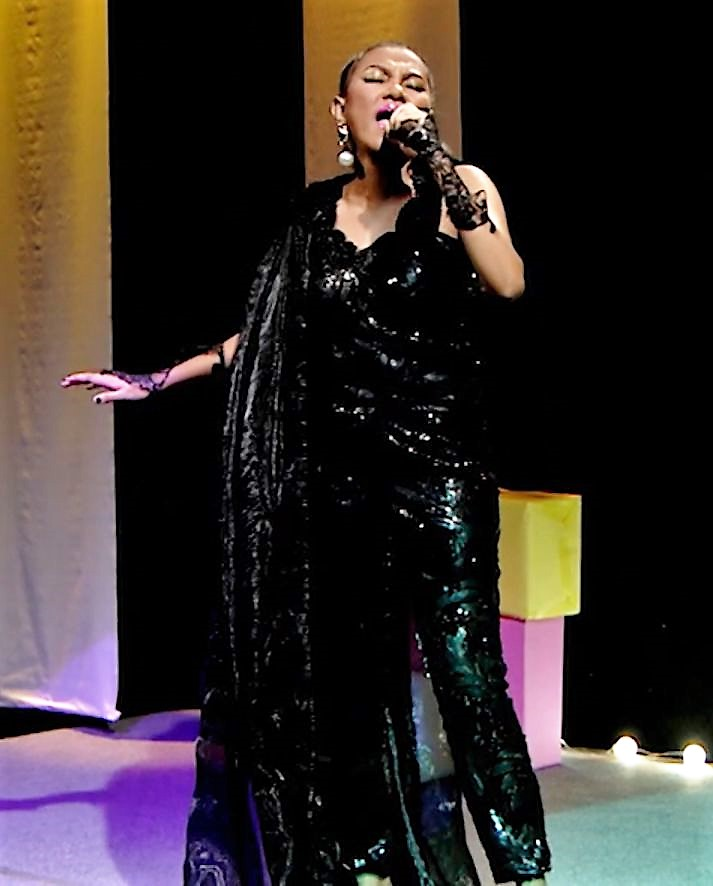
MarVi during a television appearance on GMN TV (2020)

In 2018, under the stage name Marvi, Vitória participated in the sixth season of The Voice Portugal, although the competition was held in Portuguese, which Vitória knew from school but did not fully master. She later said it was "out of her comfort zone." With her mentor Marisa Liz, Vitória became one of the top 5 finalists. Xanana Gusmão was a guest viewer in one episode to support her. On 30 December, Vitória won the final of The Voice Portugal. Since then, she has made numerous appearances at home and abroad and is also in demand as a promotional representative.

=== 2022–present: Liurai Feto ===
On 11 February 2022, Vitória released her first single as a solo artist, "Iluzaun" (Illusion). The song was written by one of her managers.

In 2025, Vitória released her album "Liurai Feto" (Queen). Photos included on the album show the singer dressed in a traditional tais. Unusually, Vitória shows her leg, which led to fierce criticism on social media, including from Aurélio Guterres. There were allegations that she was destroying Timorese culture, while others called Vitória a prostitute. There were also positive voices, however, who described the images as a creative use of Tais as a means of promoting culture. Anthropologist Josh Trindade stated that Vitória had done nothing offensive. "She expresses herself through her creation. It is not pornographic. It is a personal expression and a right to assert one's own identity. No one has the right to limit it." Bella Galhos and Virgílio da Silva Guterres also sided with Vitória.

== Personal life ==
From 2019 to 2021, Vitória was the first UNICEF Goodwill Ambassador (UNICEF Youth Advocate) from East Timor. She also adopted two children who live in a house with Vitória, her father and siblings. In 2023, she studied English at the Instituto Superior Cristal (ISC).
