= Mia Rose =

English-born singer-songwriter

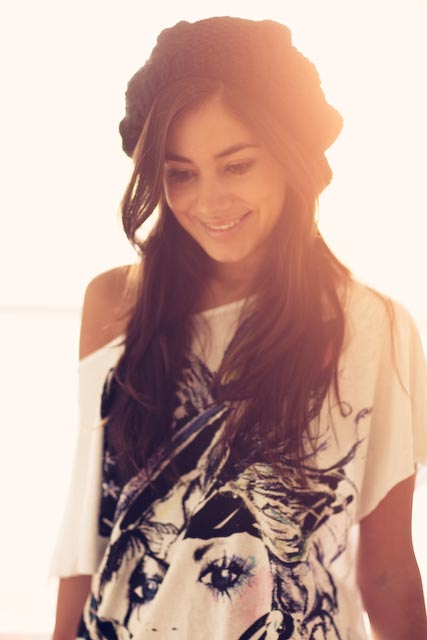
- Mia Rose in 2010

Background information
- Born: Maria Antonia Teixeira Rosa; 26 January 1988 (age 38); Wimbledon, London, England
- Genres: Pop; acoustic rock; folk rock
- Occupations: Singer; musician; student
- Instruments: Vocals; guitar
- Years active: 2006–present
- Website: officialmiarose.com

YouTube information
- Channel: Mia Rose
- Years active: 2006–present
- Genre: Music
- Subscribers: 360 thousand
- Views: 158 million
- Last updated: 3 May 2025

Mia Rose (born Maria Antónia Teixeira Rosa; 26 January 1988) is an English-born singer-songwriter of Portuguese descent, notable for her popularity on the video sharing website YouTube.

== Career ==
Mia Rose was born in Wimbledon, London. Rose opened her YouTube account on 29 December 2006 during her Christmas break from university. She posted daily videos singing various cover songs and within a month set a record number of subscriptions for a musician. As of November 2010, she has more than 265,000 YouTube subscribers. In 2008, following her success on YouTube, she appeared at Google Zeitgeist and was a speaker at the SIME Conference in Sweden.

In May 2009, she wrote, recorded and marketed the song "Let Go", selling it on iTunes in Portugal, where it became the best selling download, and got to number 2 on the Portuguese charts.

She and Jordanian musician Hanna Gargour performed the song "Waiting on the World to Change". Queen Rania of Jordan noted this song was an example of how art can promote a reduction of the international cultural divide.

Her second self-released single, the double A-side "What Would Christmas Be Like?" / "Fallin’ For You" was released on 2 December 2009. "What Would Christmas Be Like?" was written by Rose, while "Fallin' For You" is a Colbie Caillat song.

Her videos have been watched over 140 million times on YouTube.

She was featured in Rolling Stone, The Age, and on a BBC Radio 5 Live interview.

In January 2007, Ryan Leslie signed Rose to NextSelection/Universal. A month later, she was signed by Tommy Mottola to the Mottola Company for management. While in the US she worked with producers and writers such as Kara DioGuardi. She recorded two singles, "Hold Me Now" and "Hot Boy" for Next Selection but neither track received an official release. With the music industry struggled to cope with the digital revolution, Rose left NextSelection and Mottola and returned to Europe. In 2009, she saw her first single, "Let Go", integrating the soundtrack of the Brazilian soap opera Living Life.

In 2010, she signed a management contract with Australian-based management agency Showcase of Stars and is still currently represented by them.

== 2011 – 2013 – The Voice (A Voz de Portugal), Lorax, Swirl and Exit Vine ==
In 2011, Rose signed on to become one of the judges of the Portuguese version of The Voice, A Voz de Portugal, after being the people's choice upon voting. Rose's team came 3rd in the overall competition.

In January 2012, Rose was asked to be the opening performer for the James Morrison tour in Portugal, where she performed in both Lisbon and Oporto.

In February 2012, Rose released her own ice cream Mia Rose Swirl with "Olá", the Portuguese offshoot of Wall's/Good Humor ice cream brand.

In mid-2012, Rose became the voice of Audrey for the Portuguese version of The Lorax and made headlines because of a compelling performance

In early 2013, Rose announced her involvement in a new fictional series with US Red Bull music department called "Exit Vine". While in Los Angeles, California, Rose has performed at coveted venues including House of Blues.

== Critical response ==
Alexa Baracaia of the Evening Standard reported on 30 January 2007, that her YouTube page was attracting over 3 million viewers a month, but that there were allegations of "fake comments" being posted to inflate her appeal. In March 2008, Forbes announced her being among the nominees for the 2008 YouTube Video Awards. Rolling Stone's Elizabeth Goodman noted she was "disturbingly well-packaged" and noted another YouTube member's video which identified numerous dummy accounts that may have artificially inflated Rose's YouTube ratings.

== Discography ==
=== Singles ===
Single	Year	Portuguese Chart
"Let Go"	2009	2
"What Would Christmas Be Like?"	2009	2
"Falling for You"	2009	2
"Friends in Love"	2012	2

== See also ==
- List of YouTube celebrities
