= Deolinda Kinzimba =

Angolan singer-songwriter and actress (born 1995)

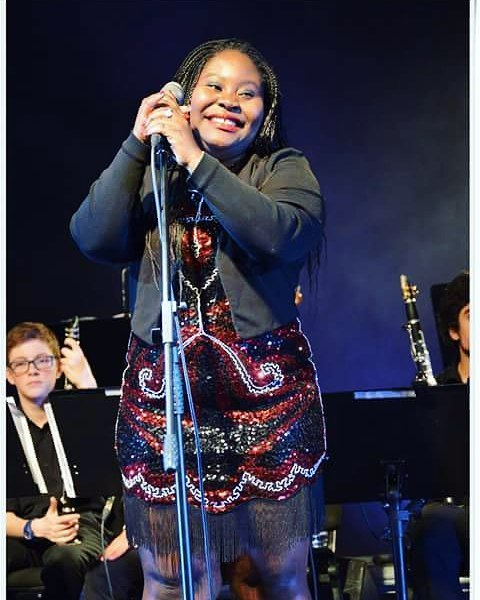
- Kinzimba in 2016

Background information
- Born: Deolinda Inês Caetano Kinzimba; May 11, 1995 (age 30); Luanda, Angola
- Genres: Pop, rhythm and blues, soul
- Occupations: Singer-songwriter, actress
- Instrument: Vocals
- Years active: 2015–present

Deolinda Inês Caetano Kinzimba (born 11 May 1995) is an Angolan singer-songwriter and actress.

== Biography ==
Kinzimba was born in Luanda and grew up in Ingombota. She said she had a happy childhood and was interested in music from a young age. Her influences include Phyllis Hyman and Selena Quintanilla. Kinzimba lived in Tanzania as a teenager because she had a sister who worked at the Angolan embassy. She moved to Guimarães, Portugal in 2014 to study and to have better opportunities. Kinzimba took a law course in Porto.

In 2016, she won the third season of The Voice Portugal. Kinzimba was dubbed "the new Whitney Houston" as she performed Houston's hit song "I Have Nothing" to great acclaim. She performed "I Will Always Love You" by Mariah Carey and "A Moment Like This" by Kelly Clarkson in the finale. Kinzimba was reunited with her mother, whom she had not seen in two years. As a result of the win, Kinzimba signed a deal with Universal. In September 2016, she starred in the show "Dentro".

Her first single, "Primeira Vez", was released in October 2016. In November 2017, she released her debut self-titled album. "Deolinda Kinzimba" received three and a half stars from Sábado, praising Kimzimba's emotion and performance but criticizing the predictability of the record. Even so, the magazine said it was a good debut with several strong songs. She took part in the Festival RTP da Canção 2017, at the invitation of songwriter Rita Redshoes, and reached the final of the event.

== Discography ==
Additional information needed

- 2017: Deolinda Kinzimba

== Filmography ==
Additional information needed

- 2016: Dentro (as Raquel)
- 2016-2017: Sociedade Recreativa (as herself)

Awards and achievements
Preceded by Rui Drumond	The Voice Portugal; Winner; 2015-16	Succeeded by Fernando Daniel
