= Rui Drumond =

- Born: 18 December 1980 (age 45); Torres Vedras, Portugal
- Genres: Soul; Pop; R&B
- Occupations: Singer; Song-writer
- Instruments: Voice; Guitar
- Years active: 2003–present
- Label: Universal Music Portugal
- Formerly of: 2B

Rui Alberto Martins Golias Drumond de Sousa (born 1980), also known as Rui Drumond, is a Portuguese singer.

== Career ==
Drumond participated in the Eurovision Song Contest 2005, representing Portugal along with Luciana Abreu, forming the duo "2B". They finished 17th in the semi-final, failing to qualify. In 2014, he won season 2 of The Voice Portugal. In 2017, he participated in Festival da Canção and attempted to qualify for Eurovision Song Contest for the second time, with his single "O Teu Melhor", only to be eliminated in the semi-finals.

== Discography ==
=== Studio albums ===
Title	Details	Peak chart positions
Title	Details	POR
Parte de Mim	Released: 1 Janeiro 2014; Labels: Universal Music Portugal	9

=== Singles ===
List of singles, with selected details and chart positions
Title	Year	Peak chart positions	Album
Title	Year	POR	Album
"Guardo-te Aqui"	2016	—	Non-album single(s)
"Changing Expectations"	2016	—	Non-album single(s)
"O Teu Melhor"	2017	—	Non-album single(s)
"—" denotes a recording that did not chart or was not released in that territory.

Awards and achievements
Preceded by Sofia Vitória with "Foi magia"	Portugal in the Eurovision Song Contest; 2005	Succeeded by Nonstop with "Coisas de nada (Gonna Make You Dance)"
Preceded by Denis Filipe	The Voice Portugal; Winner; 2014	Succeeded by Deolinda Kinzimba
