= Murta (singer) =

- Birth name: Francisco Murta
- Born: 31 August 1998 (age 26); Figueira da Foz, Portugal
- Genres: Soul; R&B
- Occupation: Singer
- Instrument: Voice
- Years active: 2016–present
- Labels: Universal Music Portugal

Francisco Murta, mostly known for his stage name, Murta (born 31 August 1998), is a Portuguese singer-songwriter. He was the runner-up of the season 4 of The Voice Portugal in 2016.

== Career ==
In 2016, he participated on the fourth edition on The Voice Portugal. He chose Aurea as a mentor on the blind auditions, where he sang "Georgia on My Mind". He eventually lost in the final to Fernando Daniel by public vote, granting a second place position.

On 7 August 2019 he performed at the LG Stage of Meo Sudoeste.

== Discography ==
=== Albums ===
Title	Details
D'Art Vida	Released: 15 November 2019 (POR); Label: Universal Music Portugal; Format: CD, Vinil, Digital
LUV IS A LEGACY	Released: 8 November 2024 (POR); Label: Universal Music Portugal

=== Singles ===
List of singles, with selected details and chart positions
Title	Year	Peak chart positions	Certifications	Album
Title	Year	POR	Certifications	Album
"Porquê"	2019	79	AFP: Gold	D'Art Vida
"Respeitar"	2019	—		D'Art Vida
"Segredos"	2019	—		D'Art Vida
"Saudade"	2019	—		D'Art Vida
"—" denotes a recording that did not chart or was not released in that territory.

==== As featured artist ====
List of singles as featured artist, with selected chart positions and certifications
Title	Year	Peak chart positions	Album
Title	Year	POR	Album
"Rosas" (Domi featuring Murta)	2018	—	3ª Maior
"Não Quebro" (Estraca featuring Murta)	2019	—	Non-album single(s)
"—" denotes a recording that did not chart or was not released in that territory.

== Trivia ==
- The physical edition of the D'Art Vida album has a leaf with yellow daisy seeds, for those who buy the album to plant them.
