= Joana Marques =

Portuguese comedian and TV and radio presenter

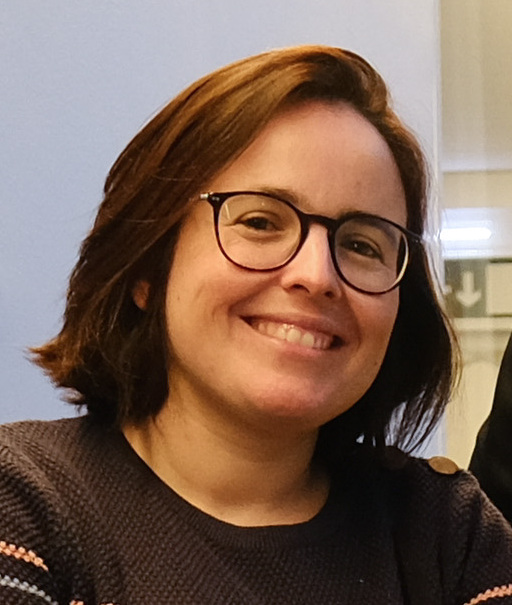
- Marques in 2024
- Born: 3 January 1986 (age 40); Portugal
- Occupations: TV and radio
- Years active: 2007–present
- Relatives: João Pedro Marques, father

Joana Marques (born 1986) is a Portuguese television and radio personality, comedian and scriptwriter. In April 2024 she was ranked ninth on a list of the 25 most influential women in Portugal in 2023. She is one of the most successful Portuguese comedians of the 2020s.

== Education ==
Marques was born on 3 January 1986. Her father, João Pedro Marques, is a historian and novelist. She has a degree in communication sciences from the Faculty of Social Sciences and Humanities of the NOVA University Lisbon.

== Career ==
In 2007, she began working as a scriptwriter. In 2012, she created and presented the programme Altos e Baixos on the Portuguese cable channel Canal Q with her then-future husband, Daniel Leitão. The title was a joke based on the considerable difference in height between the two. The programme ran for five seasons. Between 2012 and 2018, she worked at the Antena 3 radio station, where she participated in programmes such as As Donas da Casa, which she co-hosted with Ana Galvão, and Extremamente Desagradável. Her time at Antena 3 included the Toca a Todos event in December 2014, in which she, Galvão and Diogo Beja hosted a continuous 73-hour broadcast, with the aim of raising funds for the Catholic charity Caritas Portugal, in the fight against child poverty.

In December 2018, she left Antena 3, making her debut on Rádio Renascença the following month as one of the announcers on the programme As Três da Manhã, together with Galvão and Carla Rocha (Carla Rocha was subsequently replaced by Filipa Galvão, who was in turn replaced in 2021 by Inês Lopes Gonçalves). Her comedy section on the show, also named Extremamente Desagradável, became the most listened-to radio comedy show in Portugal. From 2020 onwards, she became a scriptwriter for the satirical SIC TV programme Isto É Gozar Com Quem Trabalha, starring Ricardo Araújo Pereira. In 2022, she was a judge on the 7th edition of Ídolos, being the only member of the jury who did not have a career linked to music.

== Writing and publications ==
In 2019, Marques published Vai correr tudo mal – O primeiro (e possível o último) livro de anti-ajuda and in 2022 she published Apontar é Feio. In 2022 and 2023 she wrote a column called Elefante na Sala, for Visão magazine, with the articles being published as a book in June 2024.

== Controversy ==
In July 2024, it was reported that the pop duo Anjos had taken legal action against Marques, demanding over one million euros in damages because she had shared on her Instagram page a montage that mocked the duo's performance of the Portuguese national anthem at the Algarve International Circuit before a race. In the montage, the performance is interspersed with expressions of displeasure on the part of the four judges of the 7th edition of Ídolos, including Marques herself.

== Awards ==
In 2021, Marques was a finalist for the award for best comedian of the year in Portugal, at the Hiena Awards. She was the only female candidate. In both 2022 and 2023, she received the Golden Globe for Digital Personality of the Year at the Portuguese Golden Globes, despite not having any exclusive content on the Internet besides her Instagram posts. In 2024, she was nominated for the same award. In 2022 she was the winner of the ACTIVA Inspiring Women Award, in the Arts category. In April 2024 she was ranked ninth on a list of the 25 most influential women in Portugal in 2023 by the Executiva web site, which is a web site for women.
