= Luís Trigacheiro =

Portuguese singer (born 1997)

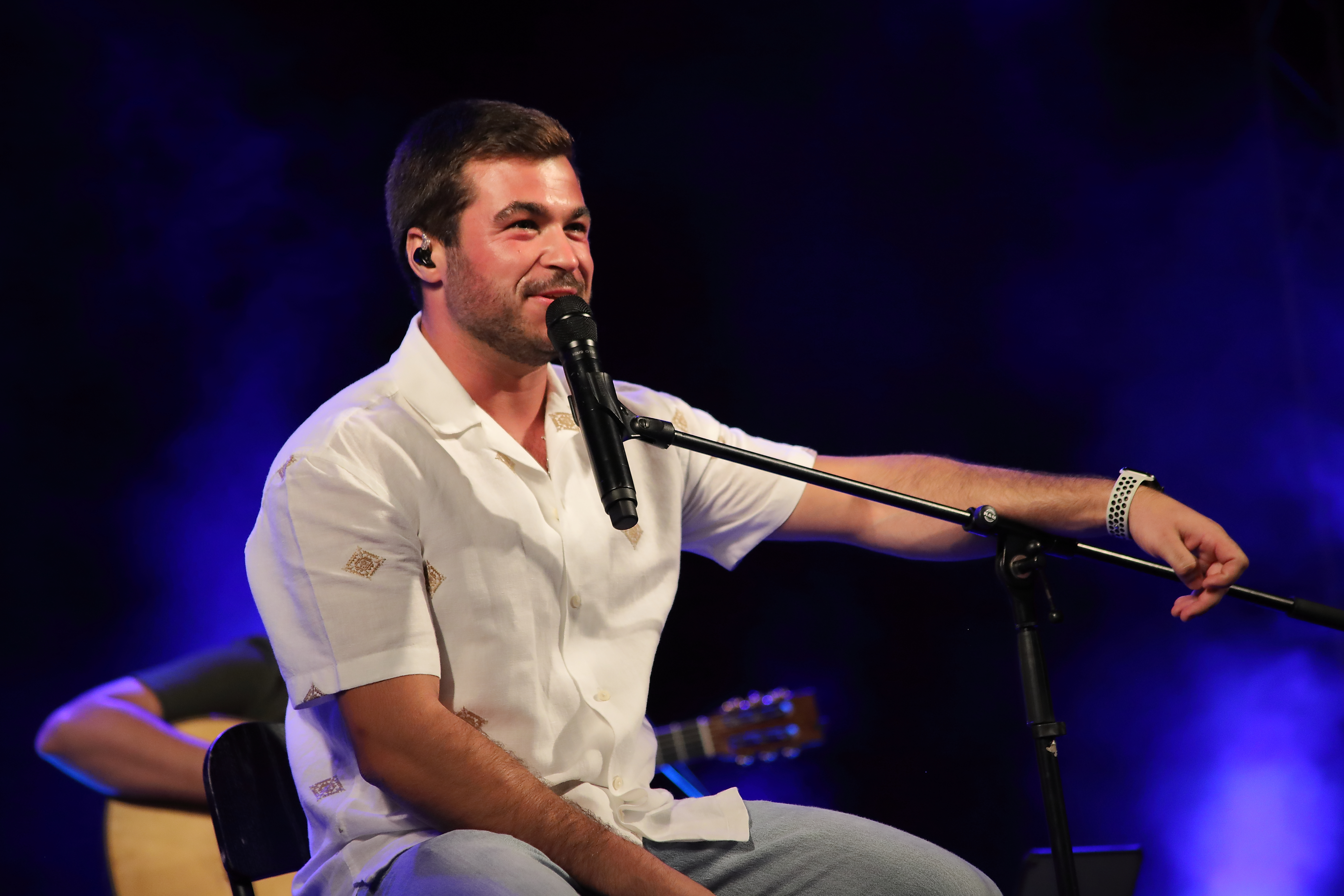

Background information
- Born: Luís Fernando Coelho Trigacheiro; 7 May 1997 (age 29); Beja, Portugal
- Genres: Cante Alentejano
- Occupation: Singer
- Instrument: Vocals

Luís Fernando Coelho Trigacheiro (born 7 May 1997) is a Portuguese singer. He won the eighth season of The Voice Portugal in 2021.

== Early life ==
Trigacheiro was born and raised in Beja, in the Baixo Alentejo, and continued his personal and academic journey in this city, enrolling in a degree in agronomy at the Polytechnic Institute of Beja.

== Career ==
Trigacheiro began singing in Alentejo singing groups from a very young age, such as "Os Bubedanas". He was one of the founders of the Alentejo band Os Vocalistas and, at the age of 23, he won the RTP1 program The Voice Portugal, presented by Catarina Furtado, in 2021.

Trigacheiro entered The Voice by chance, after being signed up by friends. He did not imagine going beyond the blind auditions, much less to the final. He immediately began working on his future in music, together with Universal Music Portugal. His blind audition, in which he performed "As Mondadeiras," made history on the show, placing him in the Top 10 best in the world.

In April 2021, Trigacheiro released his first solo single, "Meu Nome É Saudade," a song very well received by fans. In September of the same year, "Peixe Fora D'água" was released, a song written by Joana Espadinha about someone who is aimlessly wandering for love. With his first album scheduled for May 2022, Fado do Meu Cante, in March, Trigacheiro released what would become the third known single from the full-length album, "Quem Me Vê," a song by Tiago Nogueira and Ricardo Lis Almeida, from "Os Quatro e Meia", an ode to ancestors, their heritage, and how these shape identity. In 2024, he released his second studio album Ela and, in January 2025, the song "Esperando o Fim" with Nena.

In September 2025, Trigacheiro released the song "Porta 43" with Diogo Piçarra, which was nominated for Song of the Year at the International Portuguese Music Awards in 2026. On 25 October of that same year, he sold out two shows at the Coliseu dos Recreios.

== Discography ==
=== Studio albums ===
- Fado do Meu Cante (2022)
- Ela (2024)

=== Singles ===
==== As lead artist ====
- "Meu Nome É Saudade" (2021)
- "Quem Me Vê" (2022)
- "Mondadeiras" (2022)
- "O Meu Alentejo" (2022)
- "Amanhã É Melhor" (2022)
- "Mulher Contigo É Para Casar" (2023)
- "Era Noite de Lua Cheia" (2024)
- "Porta 43", with Diogo Piçarra (2025)

==== As featured artist ====
- "À Espera Do Fim", with Nena (2025)
- "Tu Na Tua", with ÁTOA and Buba Espinho (2025)
