= Lúdica Música! =

Brazilian musical group from Minas Gerais

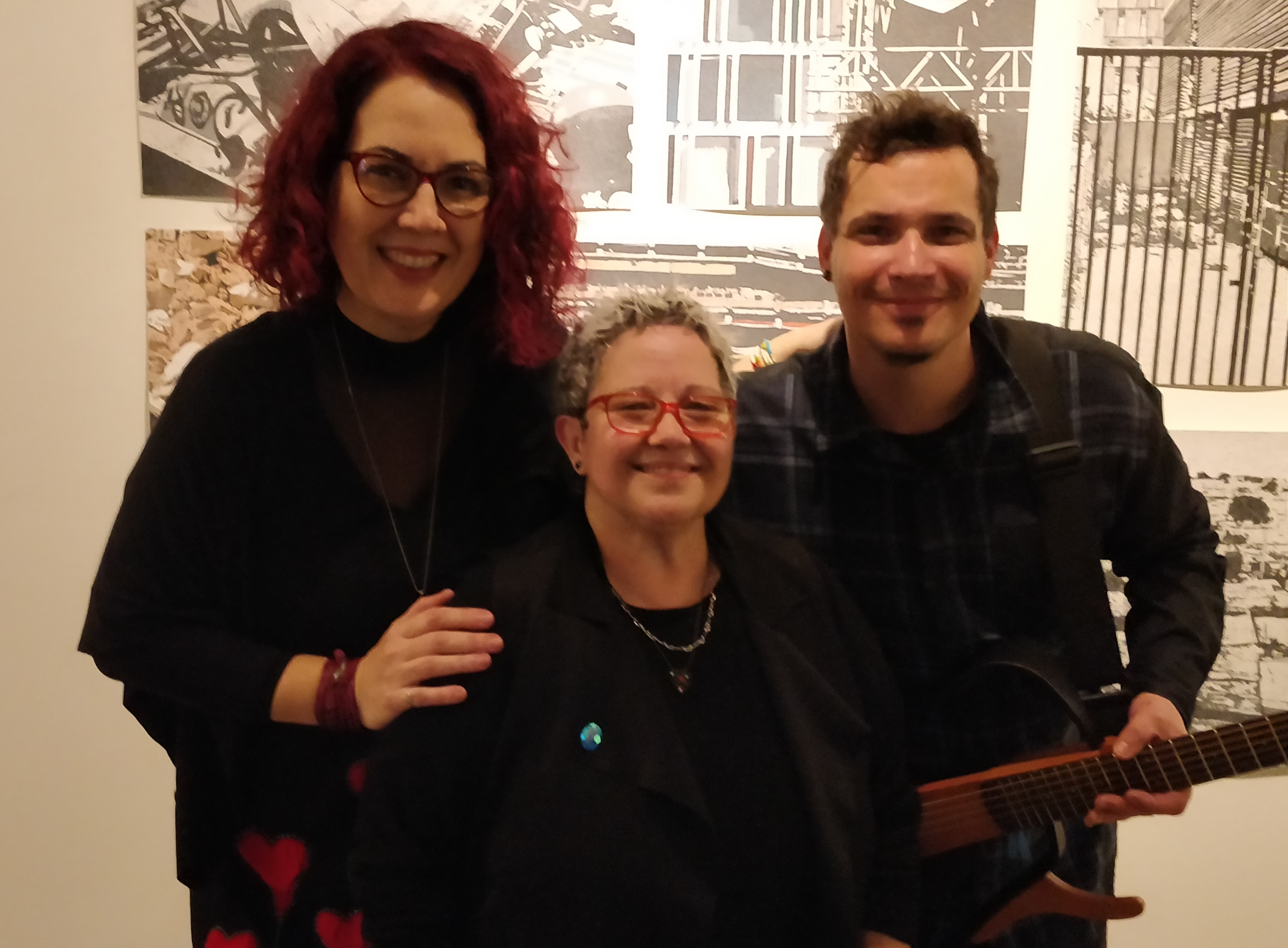

Background information
- Origin: Juiz de Fora, Minas Gerais, Brazil
- Genres: Brazilian, pop, Música popular brasileira
- Years active: 1991 – present
- Labels: Tratore, Lúdica Música!
- Members: Isabella Ladeira; Rosana Britto; Gutti Mendes
- Website: http://www.ludicamusica.com.br/

Lúdica Música! is a music group from Juiz de Fora, Minas Gerais state, in Brazil. It was formed in 1991 and specialises in MPB (Música Popular Boa - Good Popular Music). Members of the band are Rosana Britto (voice, guitar, percussion, musical direction) and Isabella Ladeira (voice, percussion), who were founder members, and Gutti Mendes (voice, guitar, percussion), who joined them in 2003. The group performs many of their own songs, as well as covers of Brazilian and international music, including songs by the Beatles. They have performed more than 3,000 concerts in Brazil and Europe (including five Portuguese seasons and two in Italy). In recent years they have spent several periods in the Portuguese town of Maia, under a project called "Maia embraces Minas Gerais", in which they both give concerts and provide training courses in Brazilian music for young people.

In August 2022, Lúdica Música! were among the finalists in the RTP television show The Voice Gerações where they were mentored by Simone de Oliveira.

== Discography ==
The group has produced both albums and DVDs.

- 1994: Lúdica Música (LP);
- 2000: Lúdica Música Presente! (CD): (Isabella Ladeira; Rosana Brito; Miguel Braga; “Pancho”; Rui “Cenoura” Ferraz; Arnaldo Fonseca) has songs written by the band as well as by Vander Lee, Lenine and others.
- 2003: Lúdica Música ....Ao vivo (promotional CD). (Isabella Ladeira; Rosana Brito; Gutti Mendes; with Juliana Brito and Vicente Martins). Includes songs by the group, as well as André Abujamra, Djavan and Lennon and McCartney.
- 2005: Então eu canto... e nem me lembro para onde as coisas vão (CD). (Isabella Ladeira; Rosana Brito; Gutti Mendes; with Ivan Lins, Gustavo Lira and Vicente Martins. Songs by the band members, Ivan Lins and others).
- 2008: Diversões Lúdicas ao vivo... e a cores! (CD/DVD); with participation by Vander Lee, Maurício Tizumba, the group Harém da Imaginação, and with contributions by Ivan Lins and Carlinhos Vergueiro.
- 2009 Som Brasil - Ivan Lins. (TV show and DVD).
- 2010: Mundo-Ludo (CD); (Isabella Ladeira; Rosana Brito; and Gutti Mendes; with the participation of André Abujamra, Marcinho Itaboray, Emmerson Nogueira and Milton Nascimento).
- 2017: Lúdica26 (2CD and DVD). (Isabella Ladeira, Rosana Brito, and Gutti Mendes, together with Caetano Brasil, Adelberto Silva, Gladston Vieira, Vicente Martins, and others). The album celebrates 26 years since the formation of the group and presents 26 remastered songs written by the members, including three previously unreleased, while the DVD was recorded live in Minas Gerais.
- 2019: Lúdica Música! Originais ao Vivo. (CD and DVD)
