= Rui Reininho =

Portuguese singer

Rui Manuel Reininho Braga best known as Rui Reininho (born 28 February 1955) is a Portuguese singer. Since 1981, he has been the lead vocalist of Portuguese rock band GNR. As a singer-songwriter of numerous lyrics and songs, he is one of the most beloved, and often controversial, icons of the Portuguese rock scene. He was born in Porto, Portugal and studied at the Lisbon Theatre and Film School (Escola Superior de Teatro e Cinema).

In 1977, Reininho, along with Jorge Lima Barreto, recorded his first LP as the band Anarband. By 1980, GNR started out playing at parochial parties for Carvalhido Church in Porto and other similar events in the area. Rui Reininho went to a concert of GNR in Pavilhão do Académico (a sports pavilion in Porto) to interview the band and eventually was invited to join the group. In 1981, Reininho recorded his first album with GNR and has remained with the band ever since.

Rui Reininho and GNR create concerts where irony, parody and provocation dominate. The band had great success in Portugal during the 1980s and early 1990s when they reached a peak of nearly 200 live performances by year. They stage – in a language often enriched by the Porto slang – the caricatured and stereotyped sides of the city's inhabitants.
