= S2Kizzy =

Tanzanian Record Producer (born 1996)

S2KIZZY
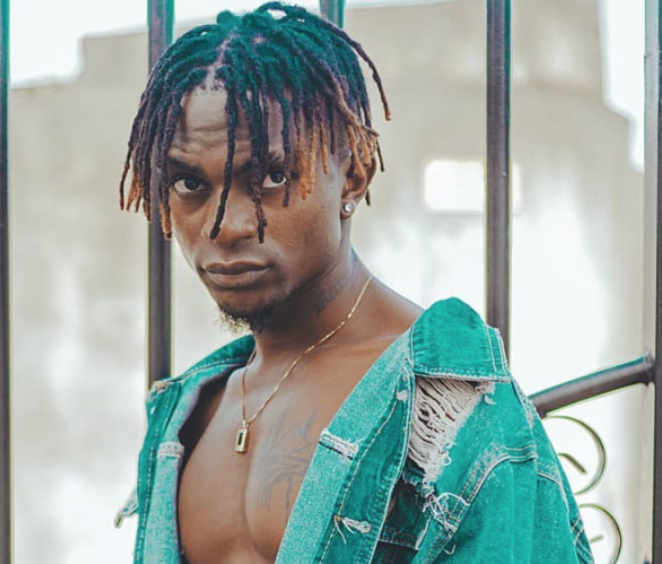

Background information
- Also known as: Zombie
- Born: Salmin Kasimu Maengo; 9 May 1996 (age 30); Mbeya, Tanzania
- Genres: Bongo Flava, Afropop, Afrobeats, Hip hop, Amapiano
- Occupations: record producer, songwriter, singer producer (music)
- Instruments: Keyboard, piano, guitar
- Years active: 2015–present
- Label: Pluto Records

Salmin Kasimu Maengo (born 9 May 1996) popularly known by his producer-artist name S2KIZZY, is a Tanzanian record producer and songwriter. He is best known for producing Bongo Flava songs "Amaboko" and "Tetema" by Rayvanny featuring Diamond platnumz. He has produced albums for and overseen the careers of Diamond Platnumz, Rayvanny, Bill Nass and Vanessa Mdee. He is credited as a 'super-producer' in contemporary Bongo-Flava, Bongo-Trap, Afrobeats and Afro-pop.

== Career ==
Maengo is the founder and current CEO of Pluto Records, but works predominantly with WCB (Wasafi Classic Baby).

Amber Rose may be working on a project with him.

== Early life and career beginnings ==
Salmin, named after the late President of Zanzibar Salmin Amour, was born in Mbeya, and raised by his auntie as her own. His mother died when he was 3 years old, shortly after which his father left and remarried. He was raised a Muslim.

His interest in music began early, and during primary school he started to learn how to play the drums. Later, during his secondary years he attended a boarding school kwiro boys high school in Morogoro, Tanzania. He used this opportunity to borrow his teacher's laptop which he used to self-teach music production. He would tell his auntie that he needed to stay in the school during the holidays as punishment, to ensure that he had time to focus on improving his craft.

He has described in several interviews the struggles he faced at the start of his career.

== Events ==
In 2020 there was a break-in at his studio in Dar es Salaam which was widely reported. Then President of Tanzania, John Pombe Joseph Magufuli, vouched to find the responsible party and government representatives personally investigated the matter.

In 2021 when the late president of Tanzania, John Pombe Magufuli, passed S2Kizzy together with AYO LIZER, ABBAH PROCESS, DONNY and other producers produced a song to commemorate his legacy featuring several Tanzanian artistes. The collaboration was widely reported and featured artists such as: Zuchu, Ben Pol, Diamond Platnumz, Rayvanny, Jux, Queen Darleen, Lava Lava, darasa, and Marioo, amongst others.

== Awards and nominations ==
Year	Award	Category	Nominated work	Result
2019	Afrima	Music Producer of The Year	S2KIZZY	Nominated
2020	Sound City MVP Award	African Producer of The Year	S2KIZZY	Nominated
2026	EAEA Tanzania	Producer of The Year	S2KIZZY	Won

== Produced songs and features ==
Year	Title
2018	"Pochi Nene"- Rayvanny (feat. S2Kizzy)
2018	"Papara"- Mimi Mars
2019	"Tetema"- Rayvanny (feat. Diamond Platnumz)
2019	"Doko"- Whozu
2019	"Nah Easy"- Tanasha Donna
2019	"Watoto"- Country Boy (feat. Harmonize)
2019	"Moyo"- Vanessa Mdee
2019	"Bado"- Vanessa Mdee (feat. Rayvanny)
2019	"Sumaku"- Jux (feat. Vanessa Mdee)
2019	"Pepeta"- Nora Fatehi (feat. Rayvanny)
2019	"Bugana"- Nandy (feat. Bill Nass)
2019	"Sensema"- Hamisa Mobetto (feat. Whozu)
2019	"Tetema (Remix)"- Rayvanny (feat. Diamond Platnumz, Pitbull, Mohombi, Jeon)
2019	"Vumbi"- Rayvanny (feat. Diamond Platnumz)
2020	"La Vie"- Tanasha Donna (feat. Mbosso)
2020	"Bench"- King Kaka (feat. Bill Nass)
2020	"Take me away"- Romy Jons (feat. Ycee, Vanessa Mdee)
2020	"Baba Lao"- Diamond Platnumz
2021	"Kadada"- Mbosso (feat. Darassa)
2021	"Lala Salama"- Diamond Platnumz, Zuchu, Ben Pol, Rayvanny, Jux, Mbosso, Marioo, Darassa, Queen Darleen, Khadija Kopa
2021	"Senorita"- Rayvanny (feat. Gims)
2025	"Down" (Diamond Platnumz & Masterpiece YVK featuring Lintonto & Xman Rsa)
