= Director Kenny =

Tanzanian cinematographer

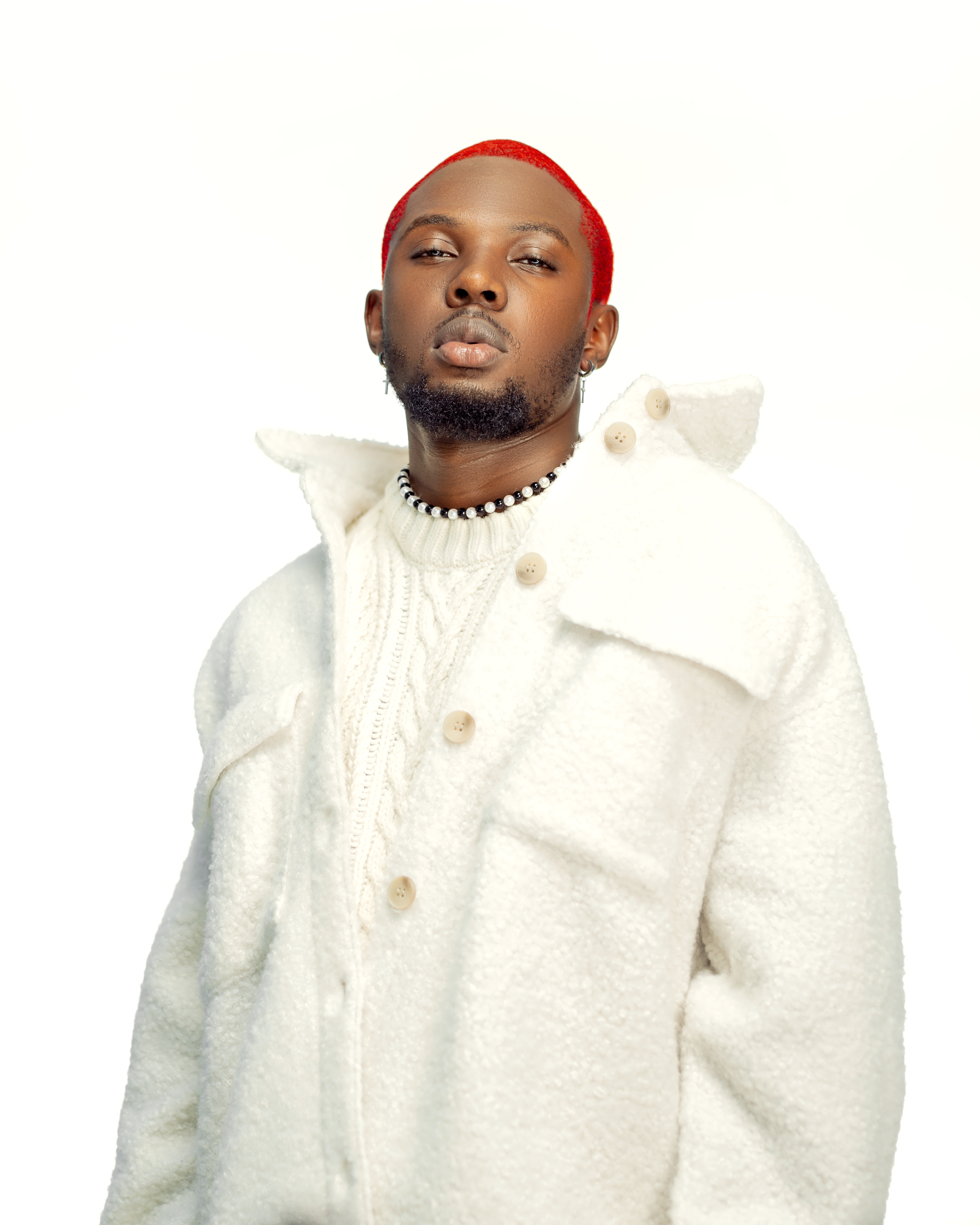
- Born: Kenned David Sanga; September 22, 1997 (age 28); Mbeya, Tanzania
- Education: Moravian Vocational Training Center.
- Occupations: Music video director, cinematographer and film director
- Years active: 2017–present

Kennedy David Sanga (born September 22, 1997), known professionally as Director Kenny, is a Tanzanian music video director, cinematographer and film director from Dar es Salaam.

== Life and education ==
Sanga was born in Mbeya, Tanzania. He had his basic and higher education in Kambarage Mbeya, Tanzania, and later studied electrical engineering at the Moravian Vocational Training Center. He undertook a production course in video shooting and directing in 2014.

== Career ==
Director Kenny shot his first professional music video in 2017 for Tanzanian artist Lava Lava's song "Dede". He then directed the video for "Nishachoka" by Harmonize. Through his company, Zoom Production, Director Kenny has shot and released more than 50 videos of hip hop, RnB, reggae-dancehall, bongo flava, and afro-pop songs since 2018. He has worked with artists such as Roki, Vanessa Mdee, Diamond Platnumz, Rayvanny, Mbosso, Zuchu, Harmonize and Tanasha Donna. Kenny directed the music video for Rayvanny's "Tetema", which was awarded "Best African Video" at the 2019 All Africa Music Awards.

== Music videos ==
List of directed music videos and artists
Year	Title	Artist	Ref.
2017	"Dede"	Lava Lava (singer)	
2017	"Nishachoka"	Harmonize	
2018	"Kwangwaru"	Harmonize featuring Diamond Platnumz	
2019	"The One"	Diamond Platnumz	
2019	"Bado"	Vanessa Mdee featuring Rayvanny	
2019	"Tetema"	Rayvanny featuring Diamond Platnumz	
2019	"Kainama"	Harmonize featuring Burna Boy, Diamond Platnumz	
2019	"Inama"	Diamond Platnumz featuring Fally Ipupa	
2019	"Kanyaga"	Diamond Platnumz	
2019	"Yope Remix"	Innoss'B featuring Diamond Platnumz	
2019	"Baba Lao"	Diamond Platnumz	
2019	"Sound"	Diamond Platnumz featuring Teni	
2019	"Moyo"	Vanessa Mdee	
2020	"Gere"	Tanasha Donna featuring Diamond Platnumz	
2020	"Jeje"	Diamond Platnumz	
2020	"Wana"	Zuchu	
2020	"Kwaru"	Zuchu	
2020	"Amaboko"	Rayvanny featuring Diamond Platnumz	
2020	"Litawachoma"	Zuchu featuring Diamond Platnumz	
2020	"Nobody"	Zuchu featuring Joeboy	
2020	"Number One"	Rayvanny featuring Zuchu	
2020	"Waah"	Diamond Platnumz featuring Koffi Olomide	
2020	"Bado Sana"	Lava Lava featuring Diamond Platnumz	
2021	"Shusha"	Baba Levo featuring Diamond Platnumz	
2021	"Sukari"	Zuchu	
2021	"Baikoko"	Mbosso featuring Diamond Platnumz	
2021	"Kelebe"	Rayvanny featuring Innoss'B	
2021	"Kiss Me"	Mbosso	
2021	"Basi tu"	Lava Lava featuring Mbosso	
2021	"Kamata"	Diamond Platnumz	
2021	"Mtaalam"	Mbosso	
2021	"Patati Patata"	Roki featuring Koffi Olomide, Rayvanny	

== Awards ==
Year	Project	Ceremony	Category	Result
2019	Rayvanny featuring Diamond Platnumz "Tetema"	All Africa Music Awards	Best African Video	Won
2019	Himself	All Africa Music Awards	Best Video Director Of The Year	Won
2020	Himself	All Africa Music Awards	Best Video Director	Nominated
2021	Himself	All Africa Music Awards	Best Video Director	Nominated
2021	Diamond Platnumz featuring Koffi Olomide "Waah"	All Africa Music Awards	Best African Video	Nominated
2021	Himself	African Muzik Magazine Awards	Best Video Director	Won
