= Tetema =

Single by Rayvanny featuring Diamond Platnumz

from the album Sound from Africa
- Released: February 20, 2019
- Recorded: 2019
- Length: 2:34 (album version)
- Label: WCB Wasafi
- Songwriters: Rayvanny; Diamond Platnumz
- Producer: S2Kizzy

Rayvanny featuring Diamond Platnumz singles chronology
"Mwanza" (2017)	"Tetema" (2019)	"Teamo" (2020)

Music video
- "Tetema" on YouTube

"Tetema" is a song recorded by Tanzanian singer Rayvanny, from his debut studio album Sound from Africa (2021). It was officially released by WCB Wasafi as a single on February 20, 2019. The track features Tanzanian singer Diamond Platnumz.

== Background and composition ==
"Tetema" was written by both Rayvanny and Diamond Platnumz, and was produced by S2Kizzy. It was officially released on February 20, 2019.

== Music video ==
The music video for "Tetema", directed by Director Kenny, was released on March 14, 2019, and it received a positive reception as the video hit 1 million views in seventeen hours, a record for a Tanzanian song at the time. Despite its success, the "Tetema" video received criticism from fans as the artists were accused of copying the video concept from Tyler, the Creator's music video for "See You Again".

== Reception ==
"Tetema" became quite popular, especially in Tanzania and across East Africa. It gained significant traction in clubs, parties, and on social media platforms due to its catchy beat and danceable rhythm. The song also received positive feedback from music critics.

Additionally, the version of the song "Mama Tetema" featuring Maluma topped the Billboard chart in Mexico, showcasing the international success of the "Tetema" series.

The song's popularity led to the creation of two remixes due to its positive reception.

Despite positive feedback, the song "Tetema" by Rayvanny and Diamond Platnumz was banned in Kenya by the head of the Kenya Film Classification Board, Ezekiel Mutua. The ban was due to the song being deemed as "pure pornography". The ban led to restrictions on playing songs like "Tetema" and "Wamlambez" outside of clubs and bars in Kenya. Tanzania's music regulatory board, BASATA, responded to this ban by addressing Mutua's directive regarding the song.

== "Mama Tetema" ==
In 2021, Colombian singer Maluma together with Rayvanny collaborated on the song, retitled as "Mama Tetema", which was released as a single with an accompanying music video. The track is a fusion of Afro-beat and reggaeton in Spanish and Swahili, inspired by Rayvanny's popular track "Tetema".

=== Background and composition ===
Maluma reached out to Rayvanny after hearing the song, leading to their collaboration. The song features new lyrics in Spanish and a reggaeton beat added by Maluma, resulting in a vibrant and dance-worthy track.

=== Music video ===
The music video for "Mama Tetema" was directed by Jessy Terrero, and showcases both artists in different locations - Rayvanny in Africa and Maluma in the United States.

=== Reception ===
The collaboration between Maluma and Rayvanny garnered attention globally, with a live performance scheduled during the MTV European Music Awards. The song reached number 12 on Billboard's Latin Digital Song Sales chart.

== Other versions ==
Mohombi, Jeon, Pitbull and Diamond Platnumz version

Rayvanny released a remix of "Tetema" that featured several international artists; Mohombi, Jeon, Pitbull and Diamond Platnumz. Despite featuring big names, this version of "Tetema" was not considered a success as hoped.

Patoranking and Zlatan Ibile version

Later in 2021, Rayvanny featured Nigerian musicians Patoranking and Zlatan Ibile for yet another version of the song; this was deemed a success by critics and fans.

== Awards ==
Year	Project	Ceremony	Category	Result
2019	Rayvanny featuring Diamond Platnumz "Tetema"	All Africa Music Awards	Best African Video	Won

== Credits and personnel ==
- Diamond Platnumz, Rayvanny – songwriting
- S2Kizzy – production
- Director Kenny – video director
- WCB Wasafi – label

== See also ==
- Music of Tanzania
- Bongo Flava
