= MTV Africa Music Awards 2021 =

- Date: Postponed
- Location: Kampala, Uganda
- Hosted by: DJ Khaled

Television/radio coverage
- Network: MTV, MTV Base, BET Africa, BET International

The 2021 MTV Africa Music Awards ceremony was the planned 7th edition of the MTV Africa Music Awards. The ceremony was postponed The event was set to be held in Kampala, Uganda and, as of 2025, it has not taken place, so it can be considered to have been cancelled. The award ceremony was to be aired live on MTV Base, and MTV was to air the event globally, in 180 countries, for the first time, according to Paul Grein of Billboard. The show was to be hosted virtually by DJ Khaled in the City of Miami. The ceremony was set to feature performances from various African celebrities; Wizkid, Sheebah Karungi, Diamond Platnumz, Khaligraph Jones, Nasty C, Suspect 95, Soraia Ramos, and Calema, among others. The repeat show was due to be aired on BET Africa, BET International, and MTV channels.

It was due to bring back the Listener's Choice category, with top 20 "Listener's Choice" finalists. The ceremony sponsor was Uganda, The Pearl of Africa. On 4 February 2021, the organizers of the MAMA's Awards, announced the postponement of the award in a statement via E-mail with The Punch, it stated "MTV Base is concerned about the current health and safety challenges". It sustained international campaign urging individual artists to boycott the event. "We will keep fans updated as we have more news," a statement tweeted by MTV Base Africa. Following the allegations of human rights violations against the President of Uganda, Yoweri Museveni, citing the post-election confinement of former presidential candidate Bobi Wine. Christine Orr started a petition to cancel the ceremony.

== Performers ==
- Wizkid
- Sheebah Karungi
- Diamond Platnumz
- Khaligraph Jones
- Nasty C
- Suspect 95
- Soraia Ramos
- Calema

== Nominees ==
The following is a list of nominees

Best Male Act	Best Female Act
Burna Boy (Nigeria); Innoss'B (Democratic Republic of Congo); Kabza De Small (South Africa); Harmonize (Tanzania); Fireboy DML (Nigeria); Master KG (South Africa); Rema (Nigeria)	Simi (Nigeria); Sheebah (Uganda); Sho Madjozi (South Africa); Busiswa (South Africa); Yemi Alade (Nigeria); Soraia Ramos (Cape Verde); Tiwa Savage (Nigeria)
Best Group	Artist of the Year
Blaq Diamond (South Africa); Sauti Sol (Kenya); Kabza De Small / DJ Maphorisa (South Africa); Calema (São Tomé and Príncipe); Ethic (Kenya); Rostam (Tanzania)	Burna Boy (Nigeria); Calema (São Tomé and Príncipe); Diamond Platnumz (Tanzania); Master KG (South Africa); Davido (Nigeria); Tiwa Savage (Nigeria); Wizkid (Nigeria)
Best Breakthrough Act	Best Hip Hop
Focalistic (South Africa); Omah Lay (Nigeria); Zuchu (Tanzania); John Blaq (Uganda); Sha Sha (Zimbabwe); Elaine (South Africa); Tems (Nigeria)	Nasty C (South Africa); Suspect 95 (Côte d'Ivoire); Khaligraph Jones (Kenya); Kwesi Arthur (Ghana); NGA (Angola); OMG (Senegal)
Best Ugandan Act	Best Lusophone Act
Sheebah; Bebe Cool; John Blaq; Vinka; Daddy Andre; Spice Diana	Calema (São Tomé and Príncipe); Preto Show (Angola); Anna Joyce (Angola); Mr. Bow (Mozambique); Nelson Freitas (Cape Verde); Soraia Ramos (Cape Verde)
Best Francophone Act	International Act
Innoss'B (Democratic Republic of Congo); Suspect 95 (Côte d'Ivoire); Dip Doundou Guiss (Senegal); Stanley Enow (Cameroon); Fally Ipupa (Democratic Republic of Congo); Gaz Mawete (Democratic Republic of Congo)	The Weeknd (Canada); Da Baby (US); Drake (Canada); Megan Thee Stallion (US); Dj Khaled (US); Beyoncé (US)
Best Collaboration	Best Lockdown Performance
"Shekere" – Yemi Alade, and Angelique Kidjo; "Jerusalem Remix" – Master KG, Burna Boy, and Nomcebo Zikode; "Smile" – Wizkid, and H.E.R; "Monsters You Made" – Burna Boy, and Chris Martin; "Already" – Beyoncé, Shatta Wale, and Major Lazer	Diamond Platnumz (Tanzania) – Africa Day Benefit Concert; Black Motion (South Africa) – Red Bull Rendezvous; Niniola, and Busiswa (Nigeria / SA) – Africa Day Benefit Concert; Singuila (Congo) – DCDR Series; AKA (South Africa) – AKA TV; Yemi Alade (Nigeria) – Poverty (live session)
Song of the Year	Best Fan Base Award
"John Vuli Gate" – Mapara A Jazz; "Amanikiniki" – MFR Souls; "Jerusalema" – Master KG; "Suzanne" – Sauti Sol; "Monster You Made" – Burna Boy; "Te Amo" – Calema; "Jeje" – Diamond Platnumz; "Munda Awo" – B2C Ent; "Nobody" – DJ Neptune; "Fem" – Davido; "Olandi" – Innoss'B; "Duduke" – Simi	Naira Marley (Nigeria); A-Reece (South Africa); Wizkid (Nigeria); Eddy Kenzo (Uganda); Diamond Platnumz (Tanzania); Nadia Mukami (Kenya); Cassper Nyovest (South Africa); Serge Beynaud (Ivory Coast); Shatta Wale (Ghana); Fally Ipupa (DRC)
Best Alternative	Personality of the Year
Adekunle Gold (Nigeria); Simi (Nigeria); Ami Faku (South Africa); Amaarae (Ghana); Afrotronix (Chad); Matata (Kenya)	Siya Kolisi (South Africa); Zozibini Tunzi (South Africa); Sadio Mane (Senegale); Elsa Majimbo (Kenya); Mark Angel (Nigeria); Yvonne Orji (Nigeria)
Listener's Choice
Anna Joyce (Angola); ASAPH (Zimbabwe); Dagi D (Ethiopia); DBN Gogo, and DJ Dinho – (South Africa); Didi B (Côte d'Ivoire); Drizilik (Sierra Leone); Focalistic (South Africa); Khaligraph Jones (Kenya); Locko (Cameroon); Malome Vector (Lesotho); Meddy (Rwanda); Mohamed Ramadan (Egypt); Ngaaka Blindé (Senegal); Pallaso (Uganda); Rayvanny (Tanzania); Sarkodie (Ghana); Shirazee (Benin); Slick Stuart & DJ Roja (Uganda); Souhila Ben Lachhab (Algeria); Tiwa Savage (Nigeria)

Note

The MTV Africa Music Awards, brings back the Listener's Choice category for the third time.
