= Innoss'B =

Congolese musician (born 1997)

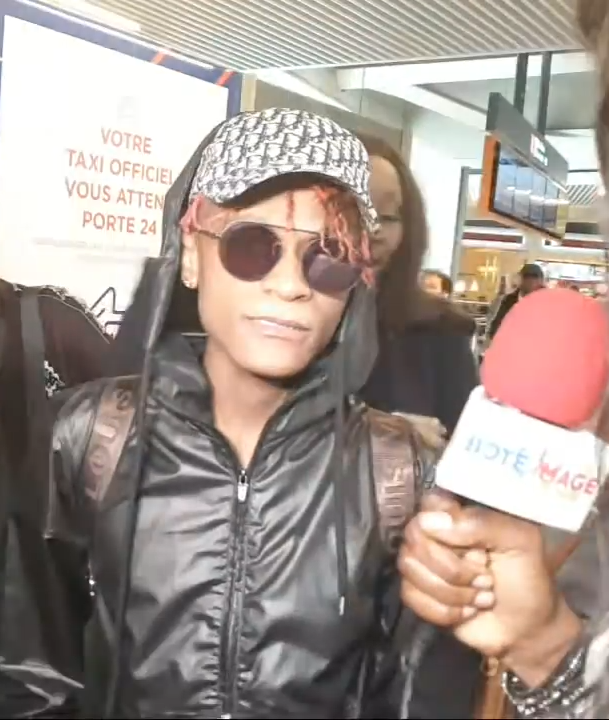
- Innoss'B during a 2019 interview

Background information
- Also known as: Mtoto wa Congo; Molodoï Leader; Jeune Leader
- Born: Innocent Didace Balume; 5 May 1997 (age 29); Goma, North Kivu, Zaire
- Genres: AfroCongo; Ndombolo; rumba; hip-hop
- Occupations: singer; dancer; songwriter; rapper; percussionist; philanthropist
- Instruments: Guitar, drums
- Years active: 2007–present
- Labels: Maisha Soul Records; Interglobe Music; Believe Music; Privaty Prod; Sony Music
- Formerly of: Maisha Soul
- Partner: Rebo Tchulo (separated)
- Children: 1

Innocent Didace Balume (born 5 May 1997), known professionally as Innoss'B, is a Congolese singer-songwriter, rapper, percussionist, dancer, and philanthropist. Often referred to as the "Jeune Leader", he is known for pioneering the AfroCongo music genre, an eclectic fusion of Congolese rumba, indigenous folklore, and ndombolo.

Innoss'B was born into a musical family in war-ravaged Goma, North Kivu, and grew up in the Birere area near Gisenyi, Rwanda. At the age of six, he began his music career as a member of the family group Maisha Soul. The group gained recognition after winning the 2007 Revelation Award at the Goma Tourism Fair. He later ventured out as a solo artist after winning the Akon-sponsored 2010 Vodacom Superstar contest, which led to his collaboration with Akon on the international song "Up and Away". On 17 July 2013, he released his debut studio album, Innocent Vol.1. In October 2015, Innoss'B made a name for himself in Kinshasa with his collaborations with Werrason on a hit single "Eloko" and later with Koffi Olomidé on "Elengi" in October 2016. On 29 June 2017, he released his five-track maxi-single, Plus. The lead track, "Ozo Beta Mabe", became an instant hit in Africa with over one million views on YouTube in just five months, making Innoss'B one of the most successful young Congolese and African artists.

The BBC tipped him as one of the African stars with the potential for global success in 2020, praising his unique style that has him "dancing to the beat of his drum" and bringing a "modern and youthful sound" to Congolese music. That year, Innoss'B became the first Congolese musician to reach more than 100 million views on YouTube for his "Yo Pe" remix, featuring Tanzanian singer Diamond Platnumz. On 26 December 2021, Innoss'B released his second studio album, Mortal 06. On 29 March 2024, Innoss'B released his five-track Extended Play (EP) Calcul. In July 2025, Billboard France ranked him tenth among the most-streamed Congolese artists in France whose careers began in the DRC or the Republic of the Congo. His third studio album, Arena Way, was released on 28 August 2026.

== Early life and career ==
=== 1997–2013: Early life and Maisha Soul ===
Innocent Didace Balume was born on 5 May 1997 in Goma, North Kivu, Zaire. His father was a dancer and his mother a church cantor. The youngest of six children, he grew up in Goma's Mikeno quarter, commonly known as Birere. He spent much of his childhood at his paternal grandmother's home, where he developed an interest in Michael Jackson's music.

In 2002, Innocent and his brothers were displaced by the eruption of Mount Nyiragongo. While living in a refugee camp, they formed the band Maisha Soul. They received training at Yolé!Africa, a youth cultural center founded by filmmaker and activist Petna Ndaliko Katondolo. Maisha Soul collaborated with several artists, including Lokua Kanza. Their song "Another Way", which debuted in 2005, won the Revelation 2007 Award at the Goma Tourism Fair.

In 2009, Innocent placed third among over 20 selected groups in a provincial singing competition organized by the International Committee of the Red Cross. The next year, aged 13, he won the Vodacom Superstar contest, organized by Vodacom in partnership with Akon, Akonic Entertainment, and Nickie Davis, after performing Michael Jackson's "The Way You Make Me Feel". He received $25,000 in prize money and donated a portion to his former school in Goma. The win also provided a platform to launch his music career, and he later collaborated with Akon on the song "Up and Away".

While still a member of Maisha Soul, Innocent released the solo single "I Can Be Your Blue Eyed Boy" through Maisha Soul Records in March 2012. The song reached No. 1 on Trace TV's Africa Hit chart. He later featured on "Dors Pas Tard" from Lexxus Legal's self-titled album Lexxus. In December 2012, he traveled to Washington, D.C., with Maisha Soul, where the group made several television and radio appearances, including on Bakolo States, owned by Gary Iwele, and Voice of America. In January 2013, Maisha Soul began a U.S. tour in Los Angeles, where the group performed at the Cinema for Peace Humanitarian Awards, hosted by Congolese-Cypriot philanthropist and model Noëlla Coursaris Musunka and organized by the Cinema for Peace Foundation at the Beverly Hills Hotel. Their performances drew attention to the humanitarian consequences of the conflict in eastern Democratic Republic of the Congo. After returning to Goma, the group released the Swahili-language mixtape Keep Smiling on 29 January, which they had recorded during their U.S. tour. On 10 February, Innocent released the solo track "Neti Na Uh" before embarking on another U.S. tour with Maisha Soul. In a July interview with Radio Okapi, he discussed the group's national tour of the Democratic Republic of the Congo. He also participated in the Global Philanthropy Forum in San Francisco and later received the Special Jury Trophy at the Ndule Pan-African Awards in Kinshasa.

== Solo career ==
=== 2013–2016: Innocent Vol.1, management woes, and standalone releases ===
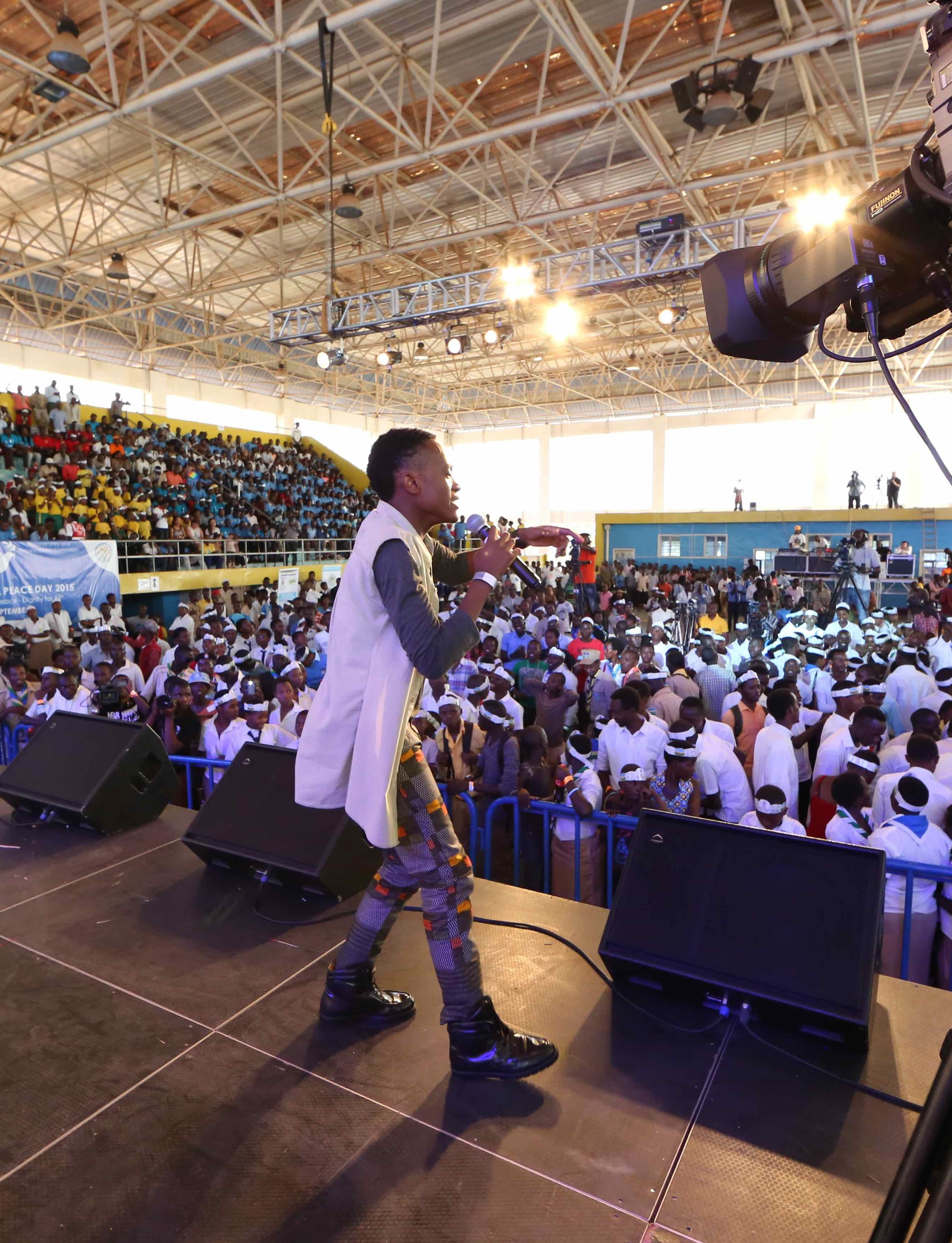
Innoss'B performing in Kigali

In an early 2013 interview with Radio Kivu1, Innocent announced his debut solo studio album, Innocent Vol. 1. The eight-track album was released by Interglobe Music on 17 July and included the previously released single "Neti Na Uh". Most of the album was performed in Lingala, marking a shift from the predominantly Swahili-language material associated with his earlier career in eastern DRC.

On 5 May 2014, he was invited by the Master Peace Foundation to perform at Holland's Liberation Day celebrations. He performed with Dutch singer Roel Van Velzen at Park de Wezenlanden in Zwolle. In October, Innocent ended his management contract with Lady Nadia, citing what he described as incompetence and unprofessionalism. He said that during her three-year tenure, Maisha Soul produced only one music video, "I Can Be Your Blue Eyed Boy", which he attributed to external support rather than her management.

In February 2015, he released the Djizzo-produced and Ach'B-directed "Pola", and later collaborated with Werrason on "Eloko", which premiered in October 2015. The song's Kinshasa-recorded video featured comedian Fiston Sai Sai. In February 2016, he performed at the Amani Festival in Goma before an audience of 30,000, and in May was featured alongside Cameroonian group X-Maleya on "First Lady". In October, he released "Elengi", featuring Koffi Olomide; sung in French, Lingala, and English, the song blended AfroCongo and Afropop influences and addressed themes of love and prosperity.

=== 2017–2018: Plus ===
In March 2017, Innocent told Télé50 that his five-track maxi-single Plus was nearing completion and scheduled for release on 29 June. Released through Maisha Soul Records, the maxi-single blended Congolese rumba, ndombolo, and AfroCongo, and was supported by "Top Model", "Ozo Beta Mabe", "Lelo Lelo", "Mur", and "Mon Boulot". During its production, he also appeared as a guest on Anita Mwarabu's "Bolingo Mabe". The "Top Model" video, which premiered on 2 November, featured his former partner Rebo Tchulo, while "Ozo Beta Mabe", released on 1 February 2018, featured Innocent dancing with classmates in school uniforms in Kinshasa. The song's title, a colloquial expression loosely meaning "you do harm", comments on negative behavior. It surpassed one million views on YouTube and gained popularity in the DRC and elsewhere in Africa. "Lelo Lelo", which blended Congolese rumba and AfroCongo with elements of ndombolo, was named among Music In Africa's "Top 5 best rumba songs in 2018".

=== 2019–2020: "Yo Pe", "Yo Pe Remix", "Olandi", "Best", and other ventures ===
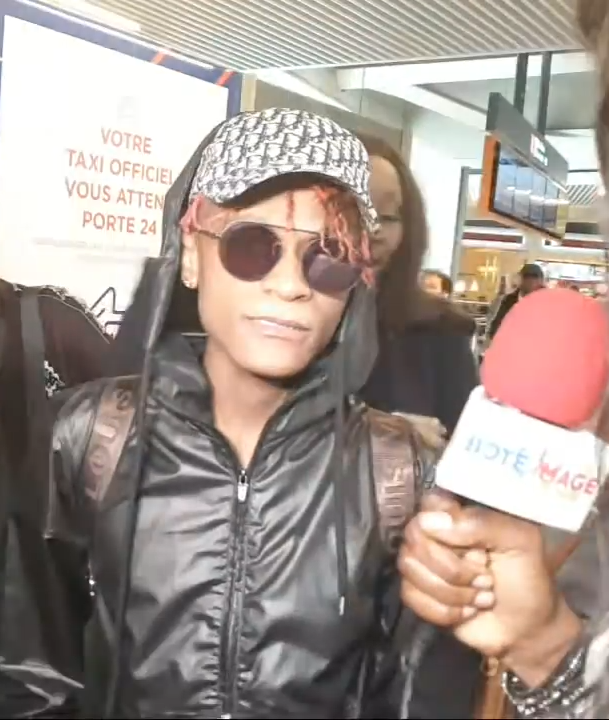
Innoss'B during a 2019 interview

On 11 August, Innocent released "Yo Pe" through Maisha Soul Records, with distribution by Believe Music. The song surpassed one million YouTube views within two weeks and addressed themes of indolence, dependency, solicitation, effortless gains, and parasitism. Its video was blocked on 10 September over copyright claims involving content owned by India-based Spice Digital South Africa, which later said its teams were working to resolve the issue. "Yo Pe" was subsequently named "Song of the Year" by Congolese entertainment website Mbote.cd.

On 7 September, Innocent released a remix of "Yo Pe" featuring Tanzanian singer Diamond Platnumz, with the accompanying video directed by Director Kenny under Zoom Extra. The video retained Innocent's original verses while Diamond contributed Swahili refrains, and the remix surpassed 150 million views within a year, becoming the first song in East Africa and Central Africa to achieve this feat so quickly. Its accompanying "Yope dance challenge" spread across social media, with Diamond later incorporating elements of the choreography into his release "Baba Lao". The success of "Yo Pe" was followed by performances across Europe, including in Luxembourg, Lyon, Essen, Brussels, Pau, Lille, Madrid, Gothenburg, London, Strasbourg, and Berlin, as well as appearances at Starboy Fest with Wizkid, the Kinshasa Showbuzz concert, and Afro Nation in Ghana in December. In June 2020, the song earned Innocent a nomination for Best New International Act at the BET Awards.

On 28 July 2020, Innocent released the AfroCongo-infused single "Olandi", which was recorded during the COVID-19 lockdowns in Kinshasa and described by him as a response to critics who later imitated his style and listened to his music, thus validating the title "Olandi" (interpreted as "you copy" or "you follow"). Produced by Maisha Soul and distributed by The Orchard on behalf of Paris-based label Privaty Prod, the song's video was directed by Ach'B and featured Innocent performing with his dancers, including choreography inspired by Michael Jackson. Mbote.cd noted that some of the video's lyrics and imagery were perceived as references to Fally Ipupa. "Olandi" reached 26 million YouTube views within six months and topped Trace Africa's weekly African Hit 30 chart. Reviewing the song for Music In Africa, Jean de Dieu Boukanga described it as "joyful and catchy" and praised its "pleasant choreographies".

Innocent released his rap-influenced single "Best", featuring French rapper Damso, on 15 October 2020. It was produced by Djizzo and Ach'B through Maisha Soul and distributed by Privaty Prod. The Kinshasa-shot video, directed by Djizzo and Ach'B, featured appearances by Congolese musicians Gaz Fabilouss, Rebo Tchulo, and Gracia Lizarbo, while Innocent recounts his determination to succeed and make his family proud. Switching between French and English, the song was described by Radio France as an anthem of hope blending Congolese music and French rap. "Best" surpassed two million YouTube views within a week.

In November 2020, Innocent was invited to perform in Ouagadougou, Burkina Faso, as part of the Burkinabè presidential election campaign. On 4 December, he performed at the Espace Bahalis Square in Lubumbashi. His concert scheduled for 25 December in Niger, at the Stade Général Seyni Kountché, was canceled due to the COVID-19 pandemic, even though it was initially slated as part of the denouement of the Nigerien presidential election campaign, scheduled for 27 December. On 6 March 2021, he released "Meme", which surpassed six million YouTube views within two months, followed by "No No" featuring Rebo Tchulo on 17 July. The latter reached one million YouTube views within three days and peaked at number two on BBC Radio 1Xtra's chart behind Diamond, making Innocent the first Congolese solo artist to achieve the feat.

=== 2021–2023: Mortel-06 and standalone releases ===
On 9 December 2021, Innocent announced that his forthcoming second studio album, Mortel-06, was almost finished. The record, which includes 15 tracks, was released on 26 December through Maisha Soul Records and is a fusion of Congolese rumba, hip-hop, and Afro-trap. It quickly landed in the top five of Congolese online music platforms. Nearly three weeks after its debut, Mortel-06 reached the top spot on Boomplay's Weekly Top Albums, ahead of Tayc's Fleur Froide and Ninho's Jefe. The popular single "Sukali" reached one million views in just two months. To promote the album, Innocent toured Abidjan, where he appeared on television to present Mortel-06, and later held a series of concerts in Kinshasa.

In July 2022, Innocent made his touring debut in Togo with a performance at Hôtel La Concorde in Lomé, followed by an American tour with concerts in New York, Chicago, Washington, D.C., Atlanta, Denver, and Dallas. On 31 December, he released the AfroCongo single "Maboko Milayi" featuring Awilo Longomba, which surpassed two million YouTube views within 13 days. He followed with "Kiss", featuring Tanzanian singer Zuchu, on 18 February 2023, and in May released a teaser for his "AfroCongo Planet Live" project. On 6 June, he appeared on Zuchu's remix of "Nani", which surpassed two million YouTube views within 10 days, followed by "Flex", featuring French rapper Kaaris, on 7 July, which reached one million views within four days.

On 6 November, Innocent featured on Yemi Alade's sixth studio album Rebel Queen, appearing on the ndombolo track "Lipeka", sung in Lingala and English. On 21 November, he released the amapiano and AfroCongo single "Mpiaka", which generated more than 10,000 TikTok videos using the hashtag #Mpiaka within 24 hours of its release.

=== 2024–present: Calcul and Arena Way ===
On 29 March 2024, Innocent released his five-track EP Calcul through Maisha Soul Records, featuring "Number One", "Sete", "Bango Kaka Te", "Bilan Zéro", and "Chantier". The EP melds Congolese rumba, AfroCongo, and Afrobeats, with a guest appearance by Nigerian singer Reekado Banks. "Sete" surpassed one million YouTube views within 13 days, while the hashtag #Sete gained traction across social media and was used by figures including Herman Amisi and Migue Niema. On 27 July, he performed at Belgium's Esperanzah! festival at L'Abbaye de Floreffe.

His amapiano-inspired single "Amapiupiu" was released on 19 September, and two days later he joined Yemi Alade onstage at Zénith de Paris. He later performed at the seventh Rencontres Musicales Africaines (REMA) in Ouagadougou, Burkina Faso, held from 17 to 18 October, and featured on Ivorian singer Apoutchou National's "Envoyez Nouveau" and Awilo Longomba's "Mbongo Na Ngai Moko", released on 18 October and 15 November, respectively. On 21 January 2025, he appeared on fellow Congolese singer Cappuccino LBG's ndombolo-infused "Biloko". Following a TikTok trend built around the song's rhythm and the phrase "quand on voit on sait" ("when we see, we know"), Innocent released "Chilling" on 28 March. On 18 July, he performed at the closing event of the inaugural World Music and Tourism Festival at Palais du Peuple, organized by the Congolese government with assistance from UN Tourism. On 1 November, he released "Love Ya RS", a Congolese rumba ballad whose video presented his perspective on his breakup with Rebo Tchulo.

On 13 February 2026, Innocent announced during an interview with the digital media platform Solola Vérité Studio that he would perform at the Arena Grand Paris on 31 October. On 8 June, he announced Arena Way, an EP intended as a precursor to the concert. On 15 July, he appeared on the beIN Sports France program Good Morning America to promote the event and later that day announced that Arena Way would be released on 28 August. On 5 August, the concert was canceled without an official explanation. Ouragan.cd reported speculation that low ticket sales may have contributed to the cancellation, although the claim had not been confirmed by the parties involved. Arena Way, initially announced as an EP, was subsequently expanded into a full-length album, with its 16-track listing unveiled on 24 August. The album featured guest appearances from Zakalara, The Mingongo, Ya Levis, Charlotte Dipanda, Serge Beynaud, Singuila, and Nesly Nefertiti, and included the previously released hit single "Love Ya RS".

== Philanthropy ==
=== Innocent Foundation ===
On 3 July 2021, Innocent established the non-profit organization Innocent Foundation (IF) to support vulnerable populations, particularly orphans and people with disabilities. According to its official mission statement, the organization prioritizes "the social well-being of the population in general and vulnerable people in particular", with a focus on providing emergency assistance, promoting education, improving basic health, and facilitating social integration for disadvantaged youth.

=== 2021 Mount Nyiragongo eruption ===
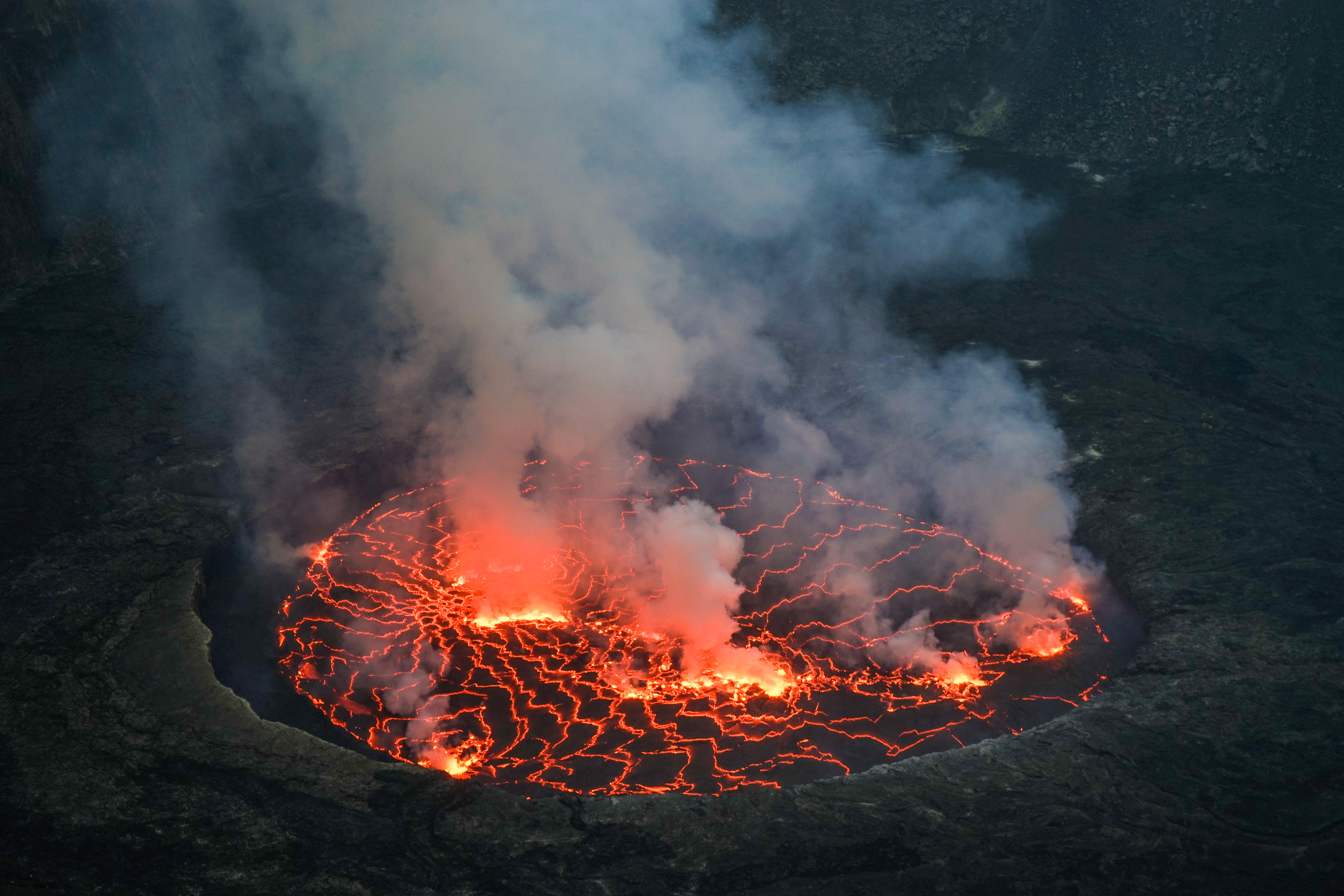
Mount Nyiragongo, an active volcano with a large, open crater. Inside the crater, glowing lava is flowing and cracking the surface, creating intricate fissures.

In response to the Mount Nyiragongo volcanic eruption in May 2021, which affected the northern areas of Goma, Innocent launched the humanitarian initiative #SOSpourGoma, in partnership with Innocent Foundation director Bibiche Ndakala. The campaign raised $100,000 to assist displaced residents. In July 2021, the foundation acquired a 20/44 plot on Kalesha Street in Goma's Lac Vert neighborhood, where it constructed ten housing units for the homeless. The development, named Umoja (Swahili for "Unity") and colloquially referred to as Cité Umoja, was created to provide long-term shelter for victims of the eruption.

=== WFP ===
Innocent has also collaborated with the World Food Programme (WFP). He developed a personal relationship with Cindy McCain, the WFP Executive Director, whom he first met as a teenager during her humanitarian visits to Goma in 2011 and 2012. Their partnership has extended to joint charitable and fundraising efforts in the United States aimed at addressing the humanitarian crisis in eastern DRC. In March 2024, the WFP appointed Innocent as a High-Level Supporter, a role in which he advocates for healthy meals and improved nutrition across the country.

== Discography ==
=== Albums ===
- Innocent Vol.1 (2013)
- Mortel-06 (2021)
- Arena Way (2026)

=== Live albums ===
- Afrocongo planet (2023)

=== Maxi-single ===
- Plus (2017)

=== Extended plays ===
- Calcul (2024)

=== Mixtapes ===
- Keep Smiling (2013)

=== Collaborations ===
Year	Title	Album
2010	"Up and Away" (featuring Akon)	Non-album singles
2010	"Merci Maman" (featuring Fally Ipupa)	Non-album singles
2013	Navio "She Likes Me" (featuring Innoss'B)	Non-album singles
2013	Navio "One and Only" (featuring Innoss'B)	Non-album singles
2019	"Yo Pe" Remix (featuring Diamond Platnumz)	Non-album singles
2020	"Best" (featuring Damso)	Non-album singles
2020	Fabregas le Métis Noir "Yo Moko Pona" (featuring Innoss'B)	Non-album singles
2021	Samarino "Oko Lelela Nani" (featuring Innoss'B)	Non-album singles
2021	Rayvanny "Kelebe" (featuring Innoss'B)	Non-album singles
2022	Shado Chris "Cabri Mort" Remix (featuring Innoss'B)	Non-album singles
2022	Ko-c "Quand J'aurai L'argent" (featuring Innoss'B)	Non-album singles
2022	"Maboko Milayi" (featuring Awilo Longomba)	Non-album singles
2023	"Flex" (featuring Kaaris)	Non-album singles
2023	Bahati "Mukando" (featuring Innoss'B)	Non-album singles
2023	Mputu Meya "Loketo" Remix (featuring Innoss'B and Rebo Tchulo)	Non-album singles
2023	Diesel Gucci "Bisous Bye" (featuring Innoss'B)	Non-album singles
2023	Zuchu "Nani" Remix (featuring Innoss'B)	Non-album singles

== Awards and nominations ==
Year	Event	Prize	Recipient	Result	Ref.
2007	Revelation 2007 Awards		Himself	Won	
2011	Ndule Awards	Special Jury	Himself	Nominated	
2019	Pool Malebo Music Awards	Best Hip-Hop Artist	Himself	Won	
2020	BET Awards	Best International Act	Himself	Nominated	
2021	Kundé d'Or	Best Featuring of African Integration	Himself	Won	
2021	MTV Africa Music Awards	Best Male Act	Himself	Nominated	
2021	MTV Africa Music Awards	Best Francophone Act	Himself	Nominated	
2021	MTV Africa Music Awards	Song of the Year	"Olandi"	Nominated	
2021	African Muzik Magazine Awards	Best Male Central Africa	Himself	Nominated	
2021	African Muzik Magazine Awards	Video of the Year	"Kelebe" (with Rayvanny)	Nominated	
2021	African Muzik Magazine Awards	Best Francophone	Himself	Nominated	
2022	The Headies	Best Central African Artist of the Year	Himself	Won	
2022	African Muzik Magazine Awards	Best Francophone	Himself	Nominated	
2022	African Muzik Magazine Awards	Best Male Central Africa	Himself	Nominated	
2023	EAEA	Artist of the Year	Himself	Nominated	
2023	Pool Malebo Music Awards	Best Hip-Hop Artist	Himself	Won	
2023	Zikomo Africa Awards	Afrochart of the Year	Himself	Nominated	
2023	Prix Lokumu	Best Male Urban Artist	Himself	Won	
2024	African Entertainment Awards USA	Best Francophone Male Artist	Himself	Nominated	
2024	African Entertainment Awards USA	Best Male Artist - Central/West Africa	Himself	Nominated	
2026	All Africa Music Awards	African Fans' Favourite	Himself	Nominated	
2026	African Muzik Magazine Awards	Best Francophone	Himself	Won	
