= RJ The DJ =

Tanzanian DJ

- Born: Romeo George Bangula; 16 August 1987 (age 39); Dar es Salaam, Tanzania
- Other names: RJ The DJ; Romy Jon(e)s
- Occupations: Dj record producer actor
- Years active: 2010–present
- Relatives: Diamond Platnumz (cousin)
- Website: romyjones.com

Romeo George Bangula (born August 16, 1987) alias RJ The DJ and Romy Jon(e)s is a Tanzanian DJ, record producer and television actor.

== Career ==
Jons worked as music video model, appearing on music videos before starting his debut career as a disc jockey in 2010. As a music video model, Jons appeared to Diamond Platnumz's debut song Mbagala in 2010. Even though he is said to be Diamond Platnumz cousin and his closest male relative, he is not signed to WCB Wasafi, a label owned by Diamond Platnumz, he works as a freelancer DJ. Expansion to his music career enabled him to perform to the whole of East Africa.

In 2020, he teamed with the likes of Marioo, Sho Madjozi, Lava Lava, Khaligraph Jones, Vanessa Mdee and Morgan Heritage on his first ever studio album called 'Changes'.

Apart from his solo works, Jons works as an official DJ of Diamond Platnumz also serves as the vice president of WCB Wasafi music label.

== Filmography ==
Year	Film	Role	Notes
2021–	Jua Kali	Bill Jr	Airing on DStv's Maisha Majic Bongo

== Discography ==
Album

- 2020: Changes

Singles

- Bang ft Khaligraph Jones, Chin Bees & Rayvanny
- Ready ft Morgan Heritage & Jose Chameleone
- Cheza ft Christian Bella & BM
- Take me away ft Vanessa Mdee & Ycee
- Kifolongo ft Khadija Kopa, Mbosso & Lava Lava
- Hapo ft Marioo
- Changes ft Alice & Fid Q
- Muonjeshe ft Mimi Mars, Young Lunya & G Nako
- Too Much ft Sho Madjozi & Marioo
- We don't care ft Rayvanny & Meddy
- Sexy Mama ft Lava Lava

Extended Playlist (EP)

- 2022:The Weekend

Singles

- Superstar ft Ntosh Gazi & Mabantu
- Blind love ft Dash
- I love you ft Lilly
- Mama ft Isha Mashauzi & Ucho
- The Weekend ft Kidylax
