= Talents2Kin =

Congolese digital media outlet

- Website type: Online cultural media outlet
- Available in: French
- Founded: 2011; 15 years ago
- Headquarters: Kinshasa
- Owner: Tonny Nsenga
- Creator: Tonny Nsenga
- CEO: Tonny Nsenga
- Services: Online news; cultural journalism; artist promotion; audiovisual production
- Website: talents2kin.com
- Current status: Active

Talents2Kin is a Congolese digital media outlet founded in 2011 by Tonny Nsenga and based in Kinshasa, Democratic Republic of the Congo. Initially a blog covering Congolese urban music, it later expanded to broader coverage of culture, entertainment, sports, technology, business, politics, and social issues. It produces written and audiovisual content, including interviews, videos, and podcasts.

At the second Soirée des Arts in November 2020, Talents2Kin received the Prix Lokumu for Cultural Media of the Year. It was nominated again in the same category at the third Prix Lokumu in 2021.

== History ==
Talents2Kin emerged at a time when Congolese rumba and ndombolo remained dominant in Congolese popular music. Although a Congolese hip-hop scene had developed during the 2000s, its artists received comparatively limited coverage from established media outlets. According to Talents2Kin, it was created to document this emerging scene, initially covering young rappers, singers, dancers, and other urban artists.

Talents2Kin was founded by Tonny Nsenga, who has also published under the name Kaniama Bauer. Over time, it expanded beyond its original focus on urban music to cover other areas of Congolese cultural and public life, including fashion, cinema, visual arts, sports, technology, and social issues.

== Coverage, concerts and projects ==
Talents2Kin covers culture, sports, lifestyle, business, technology and innovation, politics, financial education, and mental health, with an emphasis on youth and urban culture. It publishes articles, interviews, profiles, podcasts, short-form videos, and mini-documentaries.

Music coverage has focused largely on Congolese hip-hop, R&B, pop, and other forms of urban music. Talents2Kin states that it provided early coverage of emerging artists including Innoss'B, MPR, Rebo Tchulo, Gally Garvey, and Gaz Fabilouss. Its coverage has also extended to Congolese slam poetry, including Peter Komondua's album Etiké.

In April 2014, Talents2Kin and the record label Bomayé Musik organized Bana C4's first concert in Kinshasa at the Institut Français. Talents2Kin later produced Talents2Kin Vol. 1, a compilation featuring artists from the Congolese urban-music scene. The compilation's first single, "243", was a collaboration between Badi and Youssoupha. Talents2Kin also states that it helped organize Youssoupha's first concert in Kinshasa.

In March 2021, Talents2Kin collaborated with the Cultural Affairs Section of the U.S. Embassy in the DRC on an Arts Envoy program. Beginning on 2 March, the exchange brought together rappers and slam poets from Kinshasa, Lubumbashi, Kisangani, Goma, and Bukavu with artists from the U.S. through virtual workshops and freestyle sessions. The program focused on civic engagement and community issues, particularly women's rights, and was conducted partly virtually because of restrictions associated with the COVID-19 pandemic. It concluded on 18 March with the presentation of "Mwasi Telema" at the residence of U.S. ambassador Mike Hammer.
