= Gaz Fabilouss =

Congolese rapper

- Also known as: Siniama; Gazfa
- Born: Fabrice Ndongidila Kayembe; Matete, Kinshasa; Democratic Republic of the Congo
- Origin: Democratic Republic of Congo
- Genres: Hip-hop; Ndombolo; Afrobeats
- Occupations: Rapper; singer; songwriter; bandleader; record producer; record executive
- Instruments: Vocals; DAW; sampler
- Years active: 2012–present
- Labels: Afronotes Music and Cinema; P4SELL; Goldie; Jeunes Courageux
- Formerly of: B16 Music; Show Slime Music

Fabrice Ndongidila Kayembe, known professionally as Gaz Fabilouss, is a Congolese rapper, producer, bandleader, lyricist, and record executive. Often referred to as "Shina Rambo", he is considered one of the most influential Congolese rappers of all time. His lyrics often delve into themes of derision, humor, rivalry, and social commentary.

Born and raised in Kinshasa, Ndongidila first received mainstream recognition in 2016 for his debut single "You-p-yeah". The following year, he released the six-track maxi-single Nyamanitude, which was supported by the single "Tika Makolo Na Nga". In May 2018, Ndongidila released the single "Zuwa", which achieved nationwide success. His Extended play, Jeune courageux, released in July 2018, spawned his breakout singles "Aye" (featuring Koffi Olomide), "Salaire", "Love Story", and "Mwasi Nzambe" (featuring Hamisa Mobetto). Ndongidila's debut studio album, Balle réelle koleki-satan, came out in 2019, followed by his second album, Glissement, in 2023.

He is the founder of the record label Jeunes Courageux, which also operates as his backing band and is based in Kinshasa's Matete commune.

== Early years ==
While Ndongidila's exact birth date remains unknown, he was born in Kinshasa and was raised in the Debonhomme neighborhood of Matete commune. He began playing music at a young age and participated in a Catholic choir from 2005 to 2006. Influenced by rappers 50 Cent, Youssoupha, The Notorious B.I.G., and Tupac Shakur, he soon ventured into rapping. In 2012, Ndongidila teamed up with fellow Congolese rapper Hervé Muya from his neighborhood to form the rap collective B16 Music, and in 2013, they recorded their debut studio tracks "On est blindé" and "BBN". After a brief stint with B16 Music, Ndongidila left the group and co-founded Show Slime Music with JL du Ghetto, Zman Mukulu, Christian Young Thug, and KLB Mi-Zidi. His role in Show Slime Music distinguished him, and his prominence paved the way for his subsequent solo career.

== Career ==
=== 2016–2022: from "You-p-yeah" to Balle réelle koleki-satan ===
In September 2016, Ndongidila premiered his debut solo single, "You-p-yeah", which depicts the challenges and perseverance of Kinshasa's youth. The accompanying music video showcased a group of young rappers, with Ndongidila rapping about the disdain society holds toward them, with some calling them "worthless". "You-p-yeah" became a countrywide hit and was often played in nightclubs and bars. Buoyed by its success, he dropped the six-track maxi-single Nyamanitude on 6 December 2017, which included collaborations with Lil Joy on the track "Mutu Akokufa Awa" and Gaz Mawete on "Nga Se Ye". Nyamanitude included the sleeper hit "Tika Makolo Na Nga", which gained attention the next year. On 14 April 2018, he appeared at Métro Bar in Kinshasa for its second anniversary, sharing the stage with Innoss'B. The subsequent month saw the release of his nationwide hit "Zuwa", taken from Nyamanitude. In June, Ndongidila appeared in the video for Innoss'B's single "Lelo Lelo".

Ndongidila released his four-track Extended play (EP), Jeune courageux, in July 2018, which was supported by singles "Aye", "Salaire", "Love Story", "Mwasi Nzambe". Jeune courageux was produced by the German label Goldie and includes guest appearances by Koffi Olomide and Hamisa Mobetto. This project also marked the official introduction of his supporting band, which doubled as his independent record label, also named Jeune Courageux. The EP's breakout track "Aye", featuring Koffi Olomide, garnered over one million views within five days of its release and became one of the top trending Congolese videos on YouTube of that year. The ndombolo- and rap-infused single "Salaire" also yielded his furthest commercial success and amassed significant viewership on YouTube. Produced by fellow Congolese producer King Kuba, "Salaire" captivated audiences and remained in constant play. Four months after its debut, Ndongidila told Talents2Kin he was working with Ivorian singer Serge Beynaud on "Salaire Remix", which came out on 14 December 2021.

In 2019, Ndongidila released his debut studio album Balle réelle koleki-satan, through the record label P4SELL. The album consisted of 12 tracks and included guest appearances by Fabregas Le Métis Noir, Robinio Mundibu, Innoss'B, Rebo Tchulo, Titan Dangereux, and Kozi. To promote Balle réelle, Ndongidila performed at Village Chez Ntemba on 27 September 2020. He then appeared on Innoss'B's rap-tinged single "Best" music video the following month, which was succeeded by the release of his breakout single "Kaka Boye!". On 7 November, Ndongidila headlined his debut concert in Tanzania. Despite the emergence of the COVID-19 pandemic, he capped the year off with a live concert titled "A Night" in Cape Town, South Africa. In August 2022, Ndongidila headlined a concert at Village Chez Ntemba, with guest appearances by Samarino and Rebo Tchulo.

=== 2023–present: Glissement and "Nde Nini" ===
In January 2023, Ndongidila announced on Instagram that his second studio album, Glissement, was in the conclusive phases of production. The next month, he collaborated with Innoss'B on the album's ndombolo-influenced smash hit "Caler son". Thereafter, he kicked off his American tour, visiting US cities such as Dallas, Houston, and Atlanta, followed by Canadian stops in Ottawa and Montreal, and ended the tour with a performance in Vancouver after returning to Los Angeles for another concert. Earlier that February, during the tour, Ndongidila disclosed that he had contacted Lil Wayne for collaboration on Glissement. The album was officially released on 27 October 2023 through Jeunes Courageux. It consisted of 12 tracks and included guest appearances by Didier Lacoste, Asnath Dosantos, Dylan, Gally Garvey, MC Baba, Innoss'B, Boozy Neega, Hessam Le Professeur, and Razeur Boule, along with a bonus track "Miami" featuring American rapper Lil Wayne. However, shortly after its release, "Miami" stirred controversy. While a voice similar to Lil Wayne's appeared in a fan-uploaded YouTube video, the rapper was conspicuously missing from the video. The track was reportedly unavailable on several streaming platforms, and Ndongidila offered no explanation.

On 23 March 2024, he released the freestyle single "Nde Nini", which delved into themes of humor, clash, and societal criticism. On 3 July 2024, he introduced TAL'ANS, a six-track EP from the newly signed group Hôpital Music, released under his label Jeune Courageux, where he played both producer and featured artist on all songs. On 9 March 2025, he followed up with the single "New York".

== Discography ==
=== Albums ===
- Balle réelle koleki-satan (2019)
- Glissement (2023)

=== Extended plays ===
- Jeune courageux (2018)

=== Maxi-singles ===
- Nyamanitude (2017)

== Awards and nominations ==
Year	Event	Prize	Recipient	Result	Ref.
2023	JCC Awards	Best Congolese Rapper	Himself	Nominated	
2024	Mundi Music Awards	Best MMA Favorite	Himself	Nominated	
