= Meddy (singer) =

Rwandan singer

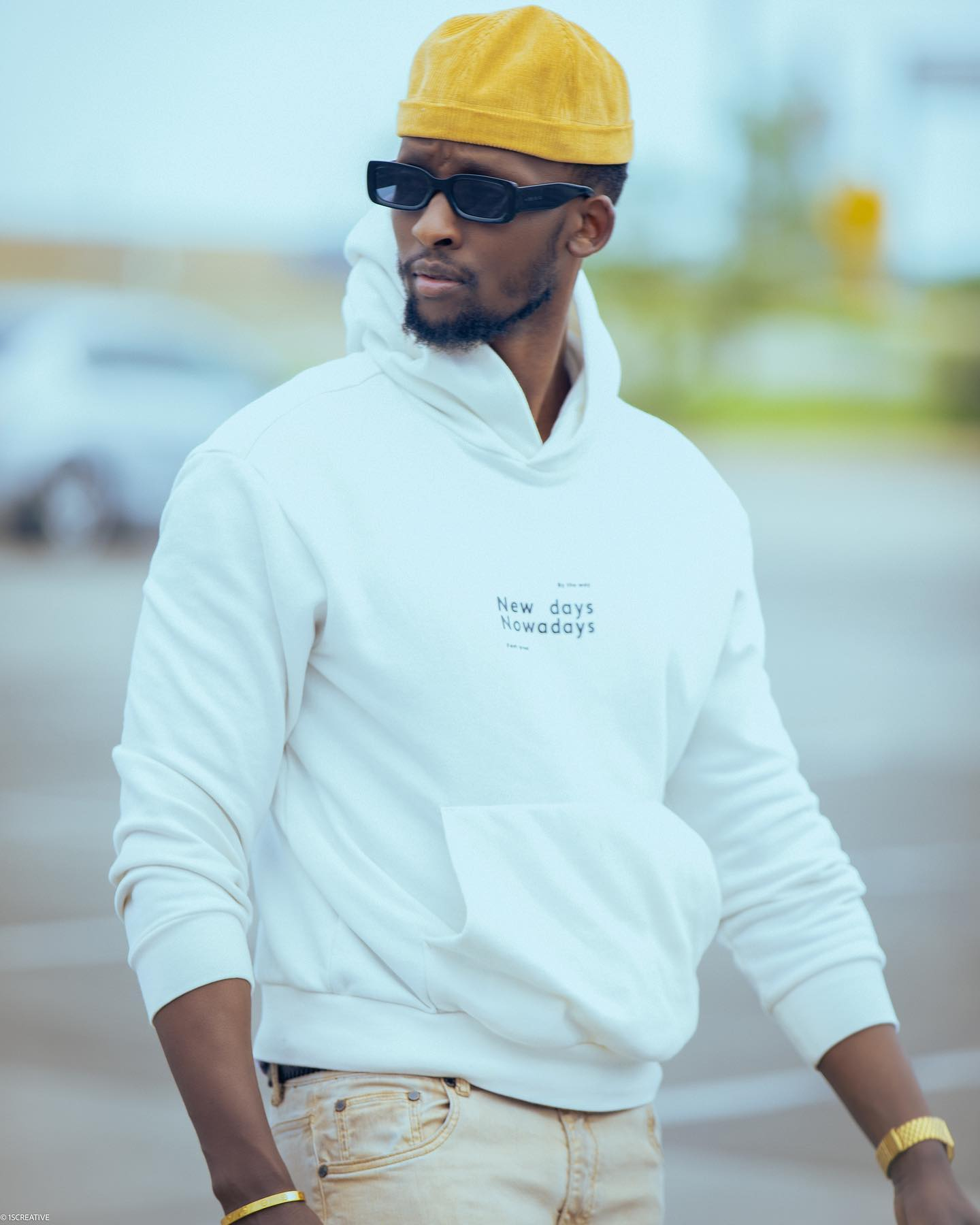

Background information
- Born: Ngabo Medard; August 7, 1989 (age 36); Bujumbura, Burundi
- Genres: Afro-pop; RnB; Gospel
- Occupations: Singer; songwriter; dancer
- Instrument: guitar
- Years active: 2008–present
- Label: PressOne music
- Spouse: Mimi Mehfira

Ngabo Médard Jobert (born August 7, 1989), known by his stage name Meddy, is a Rwandan singer and songwriter.

== Biography ==
=== Early life ===
Meddy was born on August 7, 1989, in Bujumbura, Burundi. He is the son of Sindayihebura Alphonse (father) and Alphonsine Cyabukombe (mother) who died in 2022. Meddy attended Tarrant County College in Texas.

=== Personal life ===
On December 18, 2020, Meddy proposed to his Ethiopian girlfriend Mimi Mehfira on her birthday. Meddy has shared the video of him proposing to his fiancée in the form of an acoustic version of his song. They had their first child in 2022. The family lives in Texas, U.S, where both parents work.

== Music career ==
Meddy's music career started when he was a high school student, joining local singing groups in Kigali.

In a music group named 'Justified', Meddy met musical artists currently well known in Rwanda, including The Ben, Mucyo and Lick Lick.

Meddy's career came into the limelight in 2008. By the end of 2010, Meddy and The Ben were among Rwanda's most influential pop singers. He moved to the US in 2010 for education and music purposes and joined the PressOne Entertainment music label.

Meddy had international recognition when he released the song 'Slowly' in 2017, that became a major hit in East and Central African countries. He has since worked with the likes of Otile Brown, RJ The DJ, Rayvanny, Willy Paul and The Ben and other recognized names in East African music.

== Awards and nominations ==
Year	Award Ceremony	Prize	Work	Result
2016	MTV Africa Music Awards 2016	Listener's Choice	Meddy	Nominated
2021	MTV Africa Music Awards 2021	Listener's Choice	Meddy	Nominated
2021	All Africa Music Awards 2021	Best Male East Africa	Meddy	Nominated
2022	8th African Muzik Magazine Awards	Best Male in Eastern Africa	Meddy	Nominated
2022	The Headies 2022	Best East Artist of the Year	Meddy	Nominated
