= Nzovwe =

Ward in Mbeya, Tanzania

Nzovwe Kata ya Nzovwe
- Ward
- Location within Tanzania
- Coordinates: 8.918°S 33.438°E
- Country: Tanzania
- Region: Mbeya Region
- District: Mbeya Urban
- Ward: Nzovwe

Population (2016)
  - Total: 25,236
- Time zone: UTC+3 (EAT)
- Postcode: 53116

Nzovwe is an administrative ward in the Mbeya Urban district of the Mbeya Region of Tanzania. Nzovwe is famous for being the birthplace and home ward of Tanzanian musician Rayvanny. In 2016 the Tanzania National Bureau of Statistics report there were 25,236 people in the ward, from 22,898 in 2012.

== Neighborhoods ==
The ward has 4 neighborhoods.

- Halengo
- Kilimahewa
- Ndanyela
- Nzovwe
