= Ya Levis Dalwear =

Congolese musician (born 1994)

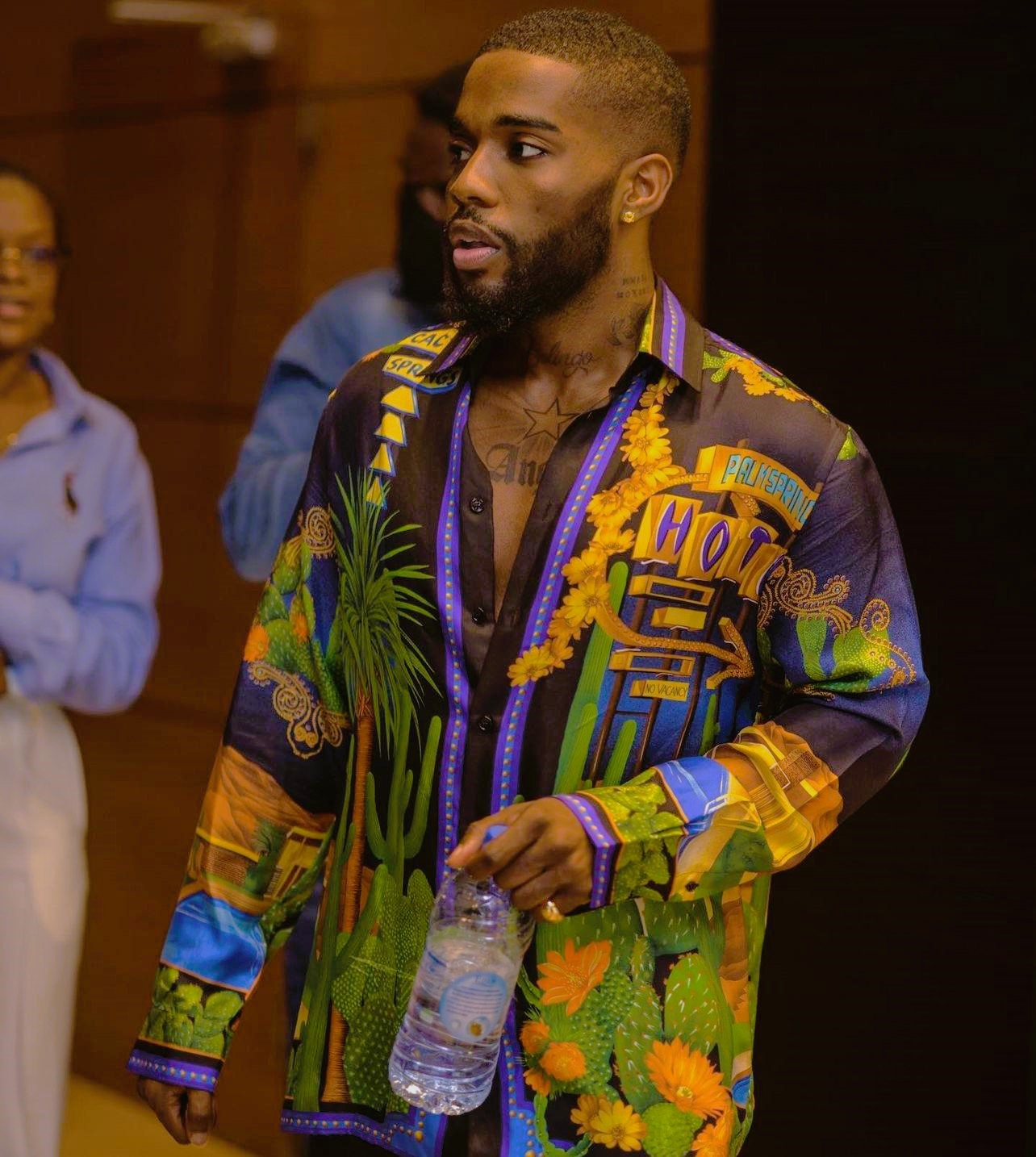
- Ya Levis in Kinshasa

Background information
- Also known as: Ya Levis; Ambassador of Love
- Born: Prince Nemiala; 9 September 1994 (age 32); Kinshasa, Zaire (modern-day Democratic Republic of the Congo)
- Genres: Ndombolo; rumba; zouk; kizomba; R&B
- Occupations: Singer-songwriter; dancer
- Years active: 2009–present
- Labels: MCP Group; Capitol Records; Sony Music Entertainment France; Because Editions; Back 2 Bellum; Dalwear Music; Play Two

Prince Nemiala (born 9 September 1994), known professionally as Ya Levis Dalwear or simply Ya Levis, is a Congolese singer-songwriter, and dancer. Dubbed the "Ambassador of Love", he is known for his mellow voice. His lyrics often explore themes of love, hatred, and hedonism.

Born in Kinshasa, he relocated to France at the age of five. Nemiala began his musical career in 2009 and later signed with MCP Group in April 2013. He rose to prominence with his 2015 breakout single "Mokolo ya l'amour" from his eponymous two-track maxi-single. In 2017, Nemiala signed a record deal with Capitol Records. He gained international recognition after releasing his 2018 Congolese rumba-infused single "Katchua", which received a gold certification from SNEP. The song was later included on his debut studio album El Mayalove (2019), which was certified gold by SNEP.

On 25 June 2021, Nemiala published his eight-track Extended Play (EP) LCLM:Prélude, which was supported by the gold-certified single "Chocolat" as well as "Lokesha" and "Nakati". On 18 March 2022, Nemiala issued LCLM, followed by Love Machine on 1 November 2024.

== Early years ==
Ya Levis Dalwear was born Prince Nemiala on 9 September 1994, in Kinshasa, Zaire (now Democratic Republic of the Congo). He was born into a well-known musical family; His father, Nico Nemiala, was a Congolese rumba musician who worked with Papa Wemba, while his mother performed in a Catholic church choir. In 1999, the family relocated to France, where Ya Levis often accompanied his father to recording studios and rehearsals. Influenced by his father and King Kester Emeneya during his formative years, Ya Levis developed a penchant for Congolese rumba. Despite his mother's reservations regarding a musical career, he remained committed to music, prioritizing it over academic pursuits following his father's death.

== Career ==
=== 2009–2016: Les Étoiles d'Afrique and Mokolo ya l'amour ===
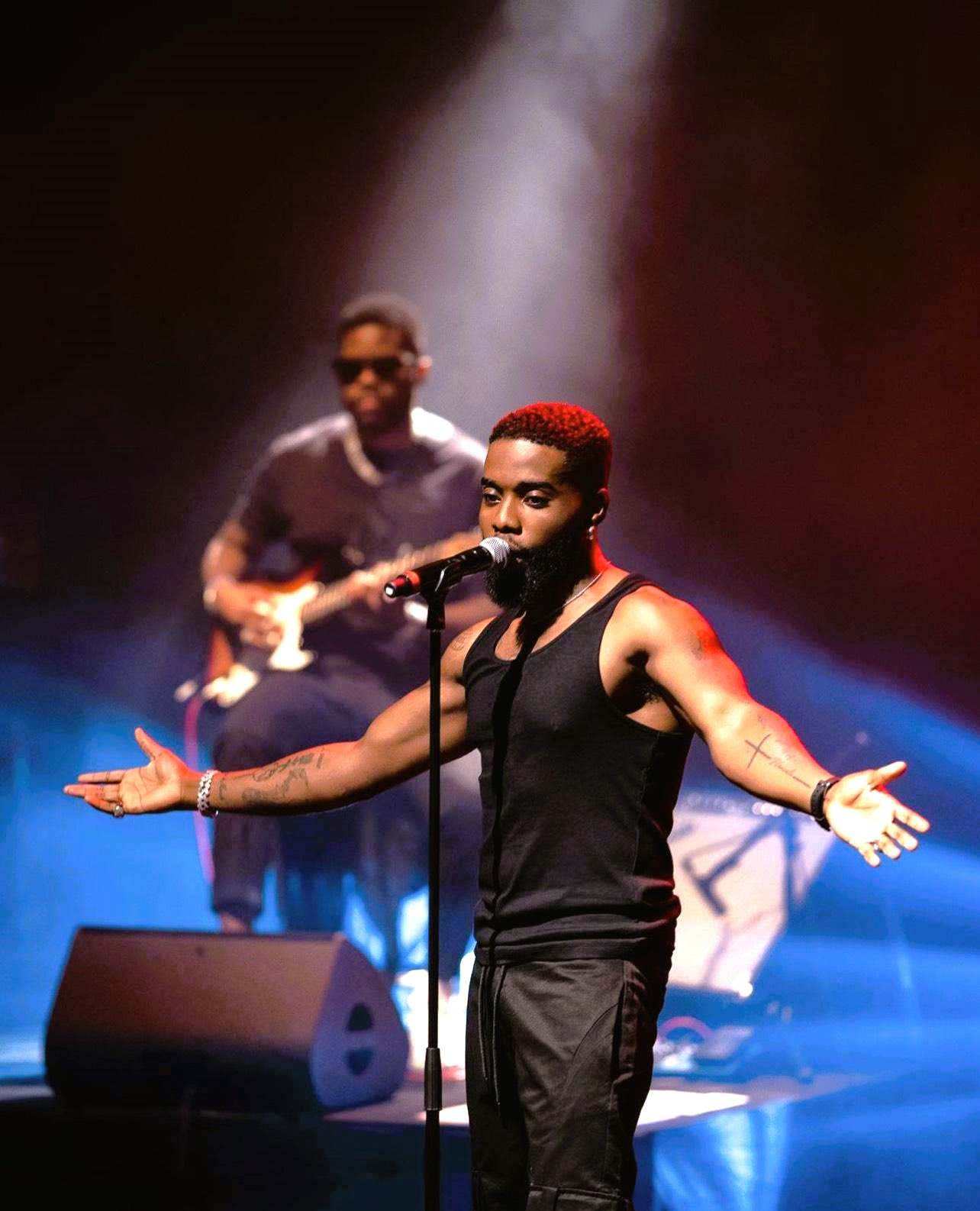
Ya Levis Dalwear performing in Paris

Ya Levis made his musical debut in 2009 with the dance troupe Les Étoiles d'Afrique alongside his brother, Olivier Dalwear. During this time, he adopted the moniker "Ya Levis Dalwear." In 2012, Ya Levis departed from Les Étoiles d'Afrique to pursue a solo career. His preliminary solo releases, "Love-Olivia" and "Shabanni", garnered significant public attention and seized the attention of MCP Group, which subsequently signed him and produced his debut two-track maxi-single titled Mokolo ya l'amour, featuring the titular track and "Canœ kayak." Mokolo ya l'amour was a blend of zouk and Congolese rumba, and particularly struck a chord with female audiences through its romanticized portrayal of Valentine's Day in "Canœ kayak."

In April 2017, he made his first live television appearance with the song "On Récolte Ce Que L'on Sème" on the program Touche Pas à Mon Poste hosted by Cyril Hanouna. On 29 December of that year, he performed a duet with the Ivorian group Kiff No Beat on the single "Farotema". On 18 May 2018, Ya Levis debuted the MCP Group-produced single "Libala," a tribute to his late mother and father.

=== 2018–2021: "Katchua", El Mayalove, and LCLM:Prélude ===
On 31 October 2018, Ya Levis released his Congolese rumba-inspired single "Katchua", which was co-produced by Mike Dallas and Chris Hamiwest through MCP Group. Sung in French and Lingala, the song's music video portrays Ya Levis' profound emotional bond and love for his partner despite any adversities they may face. "Katchua" quickly achieved international acclaim, amassing over 14 million YouTube views within eight months. The song's success boosted Ya Levis' visibility and led to performances across major African and European cities. "Katchua" earned him a nomination for Best Male Artist in Central Africa at the All Africa Music Awards, along with four consecutive nominations at the African Muzik Magazine Awards for Song of the Year, Best Male Central Africa, Best Newcomer, and Best Francophone. In May 2023, the song received gold certification from SNEP before later being certified diamond by Centre National de la Musique (CNM) in 2025 after accumulating 62,984,612 equivalent streams.

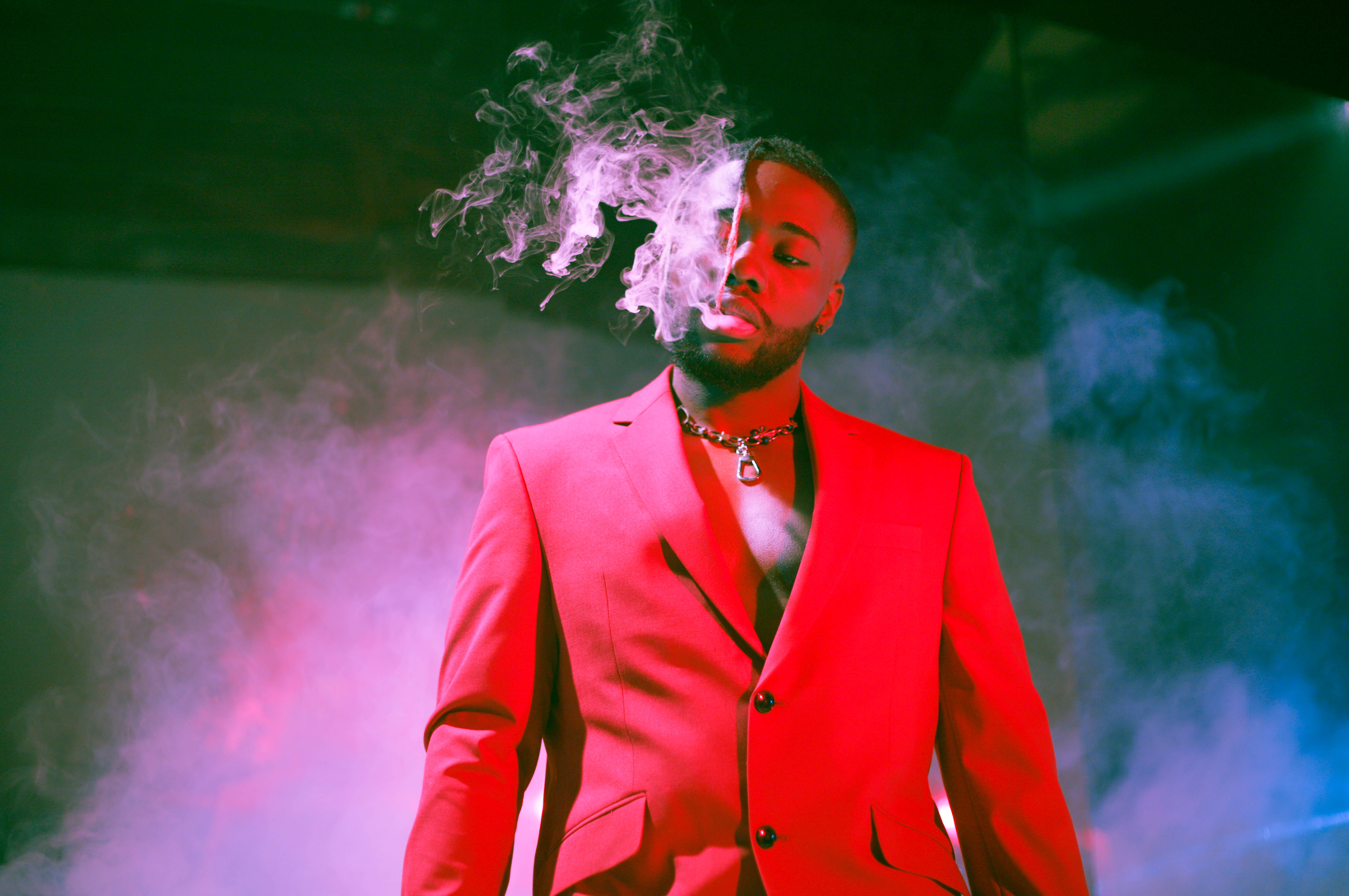
Ya Levis in 2019

On 28 June 2019, Ya Levis issued his debut studio album, El Mayalove. Released by MCP Group, the album contained 14 tracks, including his previous hit "Katchua", and blends Congolese rumba, pop, and kizomba. It features guest appearances by SAYS'Z on "Poizon," Diamond Platnumz on "Penzi," and Chris Hamiwest on the bonus track "Alyah". Ya Levis promoted El Mayalove with a performance at the 4th edition of the Red One Festival at Institut Français in Kinshasa on 13 July, followed by a show at the Intare Conference Arena in Kigali on 28 July. In 2020, he played to a full house at Eventhallen in Oslo. El Mayalove was later certified gold in 2025 after reaching 81,444 equivalent streams.

Ya Levis began recording his Extended Play (EP) LCLM: Prélude in mid-2020. LCLM is an abbreviation for L'amour Change Le Monde, which translates to "Love changes the world". On 16 October 2020, he debuted "Lokesha", the first extract from LCLM: Prélude, followed by "Nakati" on 18 December. In February 2021, Ya Levis teamed up with Congolese-French rapper Franglish in Paris to record a single, which came out on 29 January. The next month, he guest-performed on Haitian singer Joe Dwèt Filé's single "Bien plus fort". The song "Love" premiered on 13 May. During that same month, Ya Levis sought a collaboration with Congolese rumba singer Cindy Le Coeur for LCLM: Prélude. The EP was officially published on 25 June. It consisted of eight tracks with a predominant blend of Congolese rumba and R&B, with guest appearances by Franglish, Ronisia, S.Pri Noir, and Leto. He supported LCLM: Prélude with a gig in Montpellier in August 2021, then held a sold-out concert at the Machine du Moulin Rouge in Paris and a Valentine's Day event at Kin Plaza Arjaan by Rotana, produced by Wali Évent.

=== 2022–present: LCLM and Love Machine ===
Ya Levis commenced work on his second studio album, L'amour change le monde, acronymed as LCLM, in late 2021. In November 2021, he signed a record deal with Sony Music Entertainment France for the release of L'amour change le monde. He released the promotional single "Pardonne-moi" on 17 December, which blended Congolese rumba, R&B and Afro dance influences. The single "Es-tu prête" debuted on 4 February 2022. L'amour change le monde was officially released on 18 March 2022. The album was produced by MCP Group and co-distributed by Sony Music Entertainment France and Because Editions. It was a sequel to LCLM: Prélude, with 18 additional tracks. It includes collaborations with Yxng Bane, Jok'Air, Zaho, Alonzo, and Koffi Olomidé. The album's breakout single "Pardonne-moi" achieved commercial success, earning him two consecutive nominations at All Africa Music Awards for Best Artist in African R&B/Soul and Best African Male Act in Diaspora. To support L'amour change le monde, Ya Levis sold out La Cigale on 28 May.

Three months after dropping his breakthrough single "Takala", which gained major traction across social media platforms, Ya Levis premiered the remix on 5 May 2023. In October 2023, Ya Levis received a nomination for Best Artist of Central Africa at Primud d'Or. On 30-31 March 2024, he held a two-day concert at Uhuru Gardens in Nairobi for the Raha Festival, after which he featured on Gaz Mawete's track "K.O" from his self-titled album, which went viral on TikTok. He then took the stage at the Ganda Vibes Experience with Ya Levis event at Kampala Serena Hotel's Victoria Hall, organized by House of DJs and Fenon Events.

Ya Levis' third studio album, Love Machine, was initially conceptualized as an EP and was released on 20 September 2024 with a six-song tracklist, including singles like "Lifobo", "Nigani", "Ne doute pas", "Sugar Daddy", "Come with Me", and "Magie", with guest appearances by Teni and Sidiki Diabaté. On 1 November, he expanded the project into a full-length album, adding six new tracks, including one featuring Ghanaian singer King Promise, bringing the total to 12. The album was co-produced by Back 2 Bellum and Dalwear Music and distributed by Play Two, a subsidiary of the TF1 Group. Blending contemporary R&B with Congolese rumba, Love Machine received praise from Djolo magazine critic Aodren, who described it as exuding "tender vibrations". To support Love Machine, he performed at La Madeleine in Brussels on 16 November and later at Raha Rave in Nairobi on 28 December. On 13 February 2025, he dropped the single "Katalay", described as a "celebration of love, desire, and passion".

On 22 April, Ya Levis performed at the sold-out benefit concert titled Solidarité Congo, which took place at the Accor Arena. This philanthropic event featured 30 prominent artists from the French rap scene, alongside internationally acclaimed and Congolese musicians, all focused on raising money for children impacted by the Rwandan-backed M23 insurgency in eastern DRC, with proceeds going to Dadju's Give Back Charity. The concert was initially set for 7 April but was postponed in observance of the International Day of Remembrance of the 1994 Rwandan genocide.

== Discography ==
=== Albums ===
- El Mayalove (2019)
- LCLM (2022)
- Love Machine (2024)

=== Extended Play (EP) ===
- LCLM:Prélude (2021)

== Awards and nominations ==
Year	Event	Prize	Recipient	Result	Ref.
2019	All Africa Music Awards	Best Male Artist in Central Africa	Himself	Nominated	
2019	African Muzik Magazine Awards	Song of the Year	"Katchua"	Nominated	
2019	African Muzik Magazine Awards	Best Male Central Africa	Himself	Nominated	
2019	African Muzik Magazine Awards	Best Newcomer	Himself	Nominated	
2019	African Muzik Magazine Awards	Best Francophone	Himself	Nominated	
2022	All Africa Music Awards	Best Artist in African R&B/Soul	Himself	Nominated	
2022	All Africa Music Awards	Best African Male Act in Diaspora	Himself	Nominated	
2023	Primud d'Or	Best Artist of Central Africa	Himself	Nominated	
