= Mimi Mars =

Tanzanian singer

- Born: Marianne Namshali; June 21, 1992 (age 33); Paris, France
- Origin: Dar Es Salaam
- Genres: Bongo Flava Afrobeats
- Occupation: Singer Songwriter
- Instrument: Vocals
- Years active: 2017-present
- Label: Mdee Music

Marianne Namshali (born June 21, 1992) popularly known by her stage name Mimi Mars is a Tanzanian singer, actress and media personality.

== Biography ==
Mars was born on June 21, 1980, in Paris, France. She is the daughter of a former Tanzanian ambassador in France, Sammy Mdee, and Sophia Mdee. She is the young sister of Tanzanian television presenter and singer, Vanessa Mdee who is married to an American actor, Rotimi.

Mars holds a LL.B from Kampala International University in Tanzania.

== Career ==
=== Music career ===
Mars started her music career in 2017 with the release of her smash hit titled Shuga. In late 2018, Mars released her first ever extended playlist called, 'The Road' that had six tracks. With the EP, Mimi Mars became the first Tanzanian female artist to drop an EP

In 2019 she was a part of Coke Studio Africa as an upcoming artist. She has since worked with RJ The DJ, Barnaba Classic, AY, Dogo Janja, Marioo, Nandy, Darassa and other notable names in the Eastern African Music.

=== Acting career ===
Mars debuted as an actress in 2019 when she played Sophia' in "You Again", a film directed and starred in by Kenyan actor Nick Mutuma.

In 2021, she played Maria in 'Jua Kali', a drama series that aired on DStv's Maisha Magic Bongo alongside TID, RJ The DJ, Godliver Gordian, Beatrice Taisamo, Van Vicker, Patience Ozokwor and Sho Madjozi.

== Awards ==
In 2019 she was nominated in the Best Actress category at the Kalasha Awards in Kenya

In 2021, Mimi Mars won the Best Actress category at the prestigious Tanzania Film Awards

== Filmography ==
- Movies

Year	Film	Role	Notes
2019	You again	Sophia	Film was directed by Nick Mutuma who also starred alongside Eva Chemngorem and Amalie Chopetta

- Television

Year	Series	Role	Notes
2021-2024	Jua Kali	Maria	Airing on Maisha Majic Bongo on DStv
2024	Jiya	Nashipai	Airing on Maisha Majic Bongo on DStv

== Discography ==
=== Extended playlist ===
- 2018:The Road
- Christmas With Mimi Mars

Singles

1. Niguse
2. One Night ft Kagwe Mungai
3. Ringtone
4. Mua
5. Niache
6. Mdogo mdogo ft Nikki wa Pili.

=== Single releases ===
- Lala ft Marioo
- Una ft Young Lunya & Marioo
- Ohoo ft Baddest 47
- Mi Casa Su Casa
- Maua
- Wenge
- Ex ft Mwana FA
- Sitamani
- Haima maana
- Kondoo
- Papara
- Ex
- Dede
- Shuga
- One night ft Kagwe Mungai
- Mdogo mdogo ft Nikki wa Pili

Collaboration

- Christmas EP (with Vanessa mdee & Tommy Flavour)
