= Tanasha Donna =

Kenyan model (born 1995)

- Born: Tanasha Donna Oketch; 7 July 1995 (age 31); United Kingdom
- Occupations: Model singer radio host
- Years active: 2017–present
- Partner: Diamond Platnumz (2018–2020)
- Children: 1
- Musical career
- Genres: R&B; Afrobeat; bongo flava

Tanasha Donna Oketch (born 7 July 1995) is a Kenyan model, singer, entrepreneur and former radio presenter for NRG Radio.

== Biography ==
Personal life

Tanasha Donna was born in Kenya on 7 July 1995 to a Kenyan mother and an Italian father. Donna spent her childhood in Kenya before moving to Belgium when she was 11 years old to live with her Belgian step-father. She gained great interest in fashion, music and modelling while in Belgium.

Donna returned to Kenya and participated in Miss World Kenya. While in Kenya, she joined NRG Radio as a presenter but later quit to focus on her music career and motherhood.

In 2022, Donna made her acting debut, in the 'Symphony' movie that was released on 9 September.

Relationships

Donna's first public relationship was when she dated a Kenyan actor Nick Mutuma at a time when she was still a commercial model. Mutuma and Donna broke up in August 2017, after seven months of dating.

In 2018, she dated a Tanzanian singer and businessman Diamond Platnumz. Donna and Diamond Platnumz established a strong relationship. In 2019, they had a son named Naseeb Junior. Their relationship gave birth to Donna's music career after they collaborated on a hit song 'Gere'.

In 2020, Donna and Diamond Platnumz broke up, each accusing the other of causing the split, without providing a clear reason.

Since her break up with Diamond Platnumz in 2020, Donna has not revealed her relationship status to the public.

== Awards and nominations ==
Year	Award Ceremony	Prize	Work/Recipient	Result
2020	2020 African Entertainment Awards USA	Best Female Artist – East/South/North Africa	Tanasha Donna	Nominated
2021	2021 African Entertainment Awards USA	Best Female Artist – East/South/North Africa	Tanasha Donna	Nominated
2021	8th African Muzik Magazine Awards	Best Female East Africa	Tanasha Donna	Nominated
2022	All Africa Music Awards 2022	Best Female Artiste in Eastern Africa	Tanasha Donna	Nominated

== Discography ==
=== Extended Playlist (EP) ===
- 2020:Donatella

Singles

- La Vie ft Mbosso
- Ride ft Khaligraph Jones
- Te amo

=== Other singles ===
2020

- Gere ft Diamond Platnumz
- Na wewe ft Avec Toi
- Sawa
- Donatella
- Kalypso ft Khaligraph Jones

2021

- Mood
- Complications ft Bad Boy Timz

2022

- Karma ft Barak Jacuzzi
- Maradona
