= Diamond Platnumz =

Tanzanian singer, dancer, philanthropist and businessman

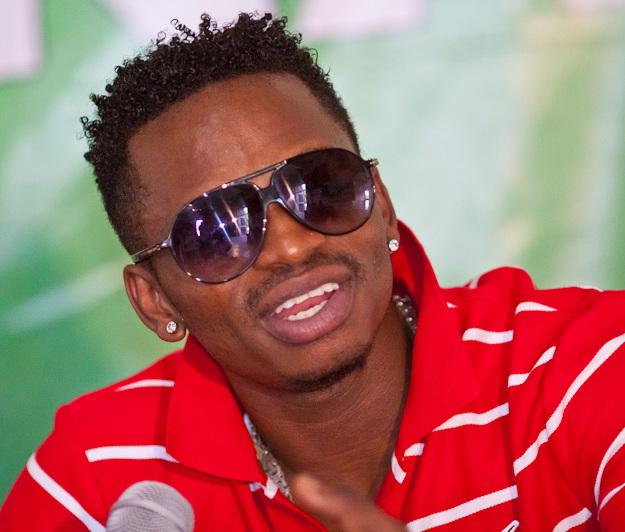
- Diamond Platnumz during a press conference in 2012

Background information
- Born: Naseeb Abdul Juma Issack tandale, Dar es Salaam, Tanzania
- Origin: Kigoma, Tanzania
- Genres: Bongo flava; Afro-pop; Afrobeats; rumba; ndombolo
- Occupations: Singer; songwriter; dancer; businessman; Actor
- Instruments: Vocals; piano; guitar; drums
- Years active: 2010–present
- Labels: WCB Wasafi; Warner Music Group; Warner Music South Africa
- Website: Diamond Platnumz on X

Naseeb Abdul Juma Issack, professionally known as Diamond Platnumz, is a Tanzanian bongo flava recording artist, dancer, philanthropist and businessman. He is the founder and CEO of WCB Wasafi Record Label, Wasafi Bet and Wasafi Media. Diamond has gained a massive following in East and Central Africa. He became the first Africa-based artist to reach 900 million views on YouTube.

After signing a record deal with Universal Music in 2017, Platnumz released his third studio album, A Boy from Tandale (2018).

In 2021, Diamond together with his record label WCB Wasafi entered into a 360 Partnership with Warner Music Group.

== Career ==
He started his music career in 2006 at the age of 15 years old while selling clothes. He would record songs with the money he earned from the clothes' business and eventually recorded his first single "Toka Mwanzo", a Bongo flava song fused with R&B.

His breakthrough hit single "Kamwambie" was released in 2010. The song won three Tanzania Music Awards. He then released his debut studio album Kamwambie same year in 2010.

In 2014, Platnumz earned a nomination at BET Awards 2014 for Best International Act: Africa. Platnumz has frequently collaborated with videographer Director Kenny for his music videos. The music video for "Waah", directed by Kenny, was nominated for "Best African Video" at the 2021 All Africa Music Awards. With over 100 Million views on YouTube, Waah is one of the most watched Tanzanian music videos on YouTube.

In 2022, he released his 10 tracks extended playlist known as First Of All (FOA) where he featured top artists like Zuchu, Adekunle Gold, Focalistic and many other top African artists. First Of All has been described as a blend of R&B, Bongo Flava and Afrobeats and to promote the EP, Diamond Platnumz for the first time in Tanzania premiered all music videos from the FOA EP at the cinema.

In 2023 Diamond Platnumz released his second collaboration with Congolese musician, Koffi Olomide marking his second feature with Koffi after Waah released in 2020.

In 2023, Diamond Platnumz won his third MTV EMA as the Best African Actor.

== Personal life ==
Diamond is a Muslim by religion. With his former partner, South African-based Ugandan businesswoman Zari Hassan, he has two children. He became a father for the third time with Tanzanian model Hamisa Mobetto. As of 2019 Diamond was dating Kenyan model and musician Tanasha Donna, with whom he fathered one son, born in October 2019. The two have since separated with Tanasha Donna flying back to her home country, Kenya.

Diamond is the cousin of Tanzanian socialite-cum-DJ, Romeo Abdul Jones. He also has two sisters, musician Queen Darleen, and entrepreneur-socialite Esma Platnumz.

In 2010, he endorsed Tanzania's dominant ruling party, the Chama Cha Mapinduzi (CCM) and its presidential candidate, Jakaya Mrisho Kikwete. He has released further songs with lyrics supporting CCM, such as "CCM Tusonge Mbele" ("CCM Let's Move Forward").

In the 2022 Kenyan general election Diamond Platnumz endorsed and performed at the Raila Odinga campaign rally at Kasarani held on 6 August 2022 just 3 days before the election.

Diamond has also been said and in various occasions confirmed that he is dating fellow WCB Wasafi label mate, Zuchu.

=== Commercial activities ===
On 23 January 2019, Diamond Platnumz was officially introduced as Pepsi Brand Ambassador in East Africa.

On 13 September 2019, Diamond Platnumz became Brand Ambassador of Parimatch Africa.

On 25 September 2019, Diamond was named the Nice One Brand Ambassador.

On 4 March 2020, Diamond Platnumz was unveiled as the new Brand Ambassador of Coral Paints (Tanzania).

On 11 December 2021 he launched Wasafibet in partnership with Odibets-a Kenyan Sports betting company.

In April 2022 he was unveiled as the new brand ambassador for Airtel Tanzania.

== Awards and nominations ==
He is the most decorated music artist in East and Central Africa.

== Discography ==
=== Albums ===
- 2010: Kamwambie
- 2012: Lala Salama
- 2018: A Boy from Tandale
- 2022: First Of All

=== Singles and collaborations ===
Year	Title	Album
2010	"Kamwambie"	Kamwambie
2010	"Nitarejea"(feat. Hawa)	Kamwambie
2010	"Nakupa Moyo Wangu"(feat. Mr Blue)	Kamwambie
2010	"Nalia Na Mengi"(feat. Chid Benz)	Kamwambie
2010	"Jisachi"(feat. Ngwair & Geez Mabovu)	Kamwambie
2010	"Wivuwivu"(feat. Rj The Dj)	Kamwambie
2010	"Mbagala"	Kamwambie
2010	"I Hate You"(feat. Hemedy PHD)	Kamwambie
2010	"Binadam"	Kamwambie
2010	"Wakunesanesa"	Kamwambie
2010	"Si Uko Tayari"	Kamwambie
2010	"Toka Mwanzo"(feat. Fatma & Rj The Dj)	Kamwambie
2012	"Lala Salama"	Lala Salama
2012	"Moyo Wangu"	Lala Salama
2012	"Chanda Chema"	Lala Salama
2012	"Nimpende Nani"	Lala Salama
2012	"Najua"	Lala Salama
2012	"Mawazo"	Lala Salama
2012	"Kwanini"	Lala Salama
2012	"Natamani"	Lala Salama
2012	"Gongo La Mboto"(feat. Mrisho Mpoto)	Lala Salama
2012	"Kizaizi"	Lala Salama
2018	"Hallelujah" (feat. Morgan Heritage)	A Boy from Tandale
2018	"Waka" (feat. Rick Ross)	A Boy from Tandale
2018	"Baikoko"	A Boy from Tandale
2018	"Pamela" (feat. Young Killer)	A Boy from Tandale
2018	"Iyena" (feat. Rayvanny)	A Boy from Tandale
2018	"Kosa Langu"	A Boy from Tandale
2018	"Nikuone"	A Boy from Tandale
2018	"Baila"	A Boy from Tandale
2018	"Sijaona"	A Boy from Tandale
2018	"African Beauty" (feat. Omarion)	A Boy from Tandale
2018	"Eneka"	A Boy from Tandale
2018	"Fire" (feat. Tiwa Savage)	A Boy from Tandale
2018	"Marry You" (feat. Ne-Yo)	A Boy from Tandale
2018	"Number One" (feat. Davido) [Remix]	A Boy from Tandale
2018	"Nana" (feat. Flavour)	A Boy from Tandale
2018	"Kidogo" (feat. P-Square)	A Boy from Tandale
2018	"Amanda" (feat. Jah Prayzah)	A Boy from Tandale
2018	"Far Away" (feat. Vanessa Mdee)	A Boy from Tandale
	"The One"	Songs
	"Jibebe"(With. Mbosso & Lava Lava)	Songs
	"Kanyaga"	Songs
	"Inama" (feat. Fally Ipupa)	Songs
	"Baba Lao"	Songs
	"Sound"(feat. Teni (singer))	Songs
	"Gere"(With. Tanasha Donna)	Songs
	"Jeje"	Songs
	"Haunisumbui"	Songs
	"Ongeza"	Songs
	"Waah"(feat. Koffi Olomide)	Songs
2021	"Naanzaje"	Songs
2021	"Kamata"	Songs
2021	"Iyo"(ft. Focalistic, Mapara A Jazz, & Ntosh Gazi)	Songs
2021	"Gidi"	Songs
2022	"Melody" (ft. Jaywillz)	First Of All (FOA) Ep
2022	"Somebody"	First Of All (FOA) Ep
2022	"Fine"	First Of All (FOA) Ep
2022	"Mtasubiri" (ft. Zuchu)	First Of All (FOA) Ep
2022	"Sona" (ft. Adekunle Gold)	First Of All (FOA) Ep
2022	"Loyal"	First Of All (FOA) Ep
2022	"Wonder"	First Of All (FOA) Ep
2022	"Nawaza"	First Of All (FOA) Ep
2022	"Ona" (ft. Mbosso)	First Of All (FOA) Ep
2022	"Fresh" (ft. Focalistic, Costa Titch & Pabi Cooper)	First Of All (FOA) Ep
2022	"Chitaki"	

=== Featured in ===
Year	Title	Album
2017	"Love you Die" (Patoranking ft. Diamond Platnumz)	
2019	"My Way Remix" (Stanley Enow ft. Diamond Platnumz)	
2019	"Yope" Remix (Innoss'B ft. Diamond Platnumz)	
2019	"Moto"(Wawa Salegy ft. Diamond Platnumz)	
2019	"Penzi" (Ya Levis ft. Diamond Platnumz)	
2020	"Wasted Energy" (Alicia Keys ft. Diamond Platnumz)	

"Watora Mari" (Jah Prayzah ft. Diamond Platnumz)

== See also ==
- Akothee – Kenyan musician and entrepreneur known for collaborations with Diamond Platnumz, Flavour, and MC Galaxy
