= Hamisa Mobetto =

Tanzanian singer, model, businesswoman and socialite

- Born: Hamisa Hassan Mobetto; 10 December 1992 (age 33); Mwanza, Tanzania Tanzania
- Occupations: singer; model; businesswoman; actress
- Years active: 2018–present
- Spouse: Stephane Aziz Ki(m. 16/02/2025)
- Children: 2
- Musical career
- Genres: Bongo flava, Afrobeat
- Label: Mobetto Music

Hamisa Hassan Mobetto (born December 10, 1994) is a Tanzanian singer, actress, businesswoman and socialite.

== Early life and education ==
She was born in Mwanza, Tanzania on 10 December 1994 to a Muslim family and was passionate about modelling as a child. She pursued her career in modelling after completing high school.

== Career ==
=== Model ===
In 2011, she participated in the Miss Indian Ocean 2011 beauty pageant, and she emerged as 2nd runner up. That same year, she also emerged second which made her compete for Miss Tanzania 2011. In 2012, she participated in Miss University Africa and succeeded among the top 10.

In 2017, She was nominated for the People’s Choice Award and Super Mum at the Starqt International Awards.

In 2018, she won Female stylish Of The Year at the Swahili fashion Week Awards. That same year, she was appointed as the host of Miss Tanzania Beauty pageant. That same year, she was nominated for Best East African Woman Entrepreneur at the BEFFTA Awards.

In December 2020, she won Best Female Digital Model of the Year at the Tanzania Digital Awards.

=== Music ===
In 2017, Hamisa appeared on a video with Diamond Platnumz on the hit single Salome.

In 2018, she released her debut single "Madam Hero". The single introduced her in Bongo Flava industry as a musician and has since garnered over two million views on YouTube. In that same year she released the single "Tunaendana".

In 2021, she launched her own record label, Mobetto Music.

== Personal life ==
Mobetto was previously in a relationship with Francis Abi and they became the parents of a daughter, Fantasy Majizzo. She was then in a relationship with singer Diamond Platnumz and they welcomed a son, Deedalayan Abdul Naseeb, in 2017. The couple later broke up for unknown reasons.

In September 2021, it was rumoured that she was in a relationship with American rapper Rick Ross. She is married to Yanga player, Stephane Aziz Ki.

== Awards and nominations ==
Year	Award ceremony	Prize	Result
2017	Starqt International Awards	People’s Choice Award	Nominated
2018	Swahili Fashion Week Awards	Female stylish Of The Year	Won
2018	BEFFTA Awards	Best East African Woman Entrepreneur	Nominated
2020	Tanzania Digital Awards	Best Female Digital Model of the Year	Won
