= Rebo Tchulo =

Congolese musician (born 1997)

- Also known as: Rebo
- Born: Déborah Mulanga Tshimpaka; December 5, 1997 (age 28); Kinshasa, Democratic Republic of the Congo
- Origin: Kinshasa
- Genres: Ndombolo; rumba
- Occupations: Singer; songwriter; dancer
- Instruments: Guitar, drums
- Years active: 2017–present
- Labels: FG Production; Maisha Soul Records; GK Projects; Def Jam Africa
- Partner: Innoss'B (separated)
- Children: 1

Déborah Mulanga Tshimpaka (born 5 December 1997), known professionally as Rebo Tchulo, is a Congolese singer-songwriter and dancer. She began her music career as a gospel singer. In 2017, Mulanga signed a record deal with Ferré Gola's FG Production label. She rose to prominence after releasing several hit singles including "Coeur Fragile", "Ni Nani", and "Biloko".

In 2020, she left FG Production and went on to release her debut single, "Mbote." Mulanga's subsequent single "Pepele", which premiered on 30 June 2021, amassed over one million views on YouTube within four months. In October 2022, she released "Contaminée" and followed it up with "Mukaji Internationale" in March 2023. She guest performed on Jules Ysok's single, "Mata Kuna Yo", which garnered over three million YouTube views in a month and debuted in the top 10 most popular Congolese videos on YouTube. Her single "Choquer", released on 15 March 2024, peaked at number two among the Congo's most-watched YouTube videos, with 446,000 views in April of that year. On 19 January 2025, she signed with Def Jam Africa and released her single "Antidote" on 28 February.

== Early years ==
Déborah Mulanga Tshimpaka was born on 5 December 1997, in Kinshasa, a metropolis situated in the western expanse of the Democratic Republic of the Congo. Growing up in the challenging and unstable Barumbu commune, she developed a penchant for gospel music and often performed interpretations at a Protestant church. Between 2005 and 2008, Mulanga began singing in church choirs and soon gained public attention. In 2015, she became a member of another revivalist congregation, where she was noted for her extravagant outfits. However, due to her ostentatious appearance, she was repudiated and later joined Chapelle du Phare church in Kinshasa in 2016. There, she participated in several competitions that allowed her to sing with several Congolese singers.

== Career ==
=== 2017–2024: Widespread recognition with "Coeur Fragile" and standalone releases ===
In November 2017, Mulanga made a guest appearance on Innoss'B's music video for the track "Top Model", from his five-track maxi single Plus. The feature propelled her into the limelight and seized the attention of Ferré Gola, who subsequently featured her in his Congolese rumba-infused music video for the single "Ma Meilleur Chemise". Following this, Mulanga signed with Ferré Gola's FG Production label and released her debut single, "Coeur Fragile", which also spawned the singles "Ni Nani" and "Biloko". After the success of her singles, she ventured out as an independent artist and released "Mbote" on 5 September 2020. "Mbote" quickly gained popularity and amassed one million views on YouTube in three months.

On 28 June 2021, Mulanga announced that her ndombolo-infused single "Pepele" was in the conclusive phases of production and slated for debut on 30 June. To promote "Pepele", she released a teaser on the same day, which sparked controversy due to its depiction of lesbianism. As a result, Mulanga was mandated to remove contentious scenes by the DRC's media regulatory body Conseil Supérieur de l'Audiovisuel et de la Communication (CSAC) before the song's official release. Paradoxically, despite the reproof, the song received widespread recognition and accumulated over one million views on YouTube within four months.

On 17 July 2021, Mulanga made a guest appearance on Innoss'B's single "No No", which swiftly gained widespread acclaim and peaked at second place on BBC Radio 1Xtra. On 8 July 2022, she was again featured in Samarino's ndombolo-infused single "Epesi Pasi", from his album Chambre Noire. She later unveiled the urban-inspired single "Contaminée", produced by Maisha Soul Records on 15 October, followed by "Mukaji Internationale" in March 2023. Within three weeks of its release, "Mukaji Internationale" peaked at number seven in the top 10 most-viewed YouTube videos in Congo for March.

She also guest-performed on Mputu Meya's remix of the track "Loketo" alongside Innoss'B on 28 September 2023, which has been viewed over 10 million times on YouTube. On 15 November 2023, she contributed to the collaborative single "Rumba Forever", which brought together several Congolese artists from all generations to honor Congolese rumba. She later joined Innoss'B on stage during his "Umoja" humanitarian concert at the La Madeleine concert hall in Brussels, where she performed alongside Yemi Alade and Awilo Longomba. On 15 March 2024, Mulanga debuted the single "Choquer", which quickly peaked at number two among the Congo's most-watched YouTube videos, with 446,000 views in April. She was then invited to Frédéric Musa's Planète Rap on Skyrock, where she performed the "Loketo" remix. On 5 December, Mulanga dropped the dance-oriented single single "Mobambo", which quickly rose in popularity in Kinshasa and earned her the moniker "Maman Na Bango".

=== 2025–present: Standalone releases ===
On 19 January 2025, Mulanga signed a record deal with Def Jam Africa and dropped her single "Antidote" on 28 February. Earlier that month, she shared a new song on her Instagram platform addressing the ongoing M23 conflict in the eastern Democratic Republic of the Congo. On 8 May, she was summoned by the CSAC to appear in court regarding violations of audiovisual content regulations related to a viral excerpt of one of her songs on social media. Following the hearing, she acknowledged her influence, particularly among young audiences and women, and committed to exercising greater responsibility in her future work.

== Other ventures ==
On 22 October 2024, Mulanga was appointed as the ambassador for Hollantex, a renowned African wax fabric brand.

== Personal life ==
Mulanga began a relationship with fellow Congolese musician Innoss'B in 2016. She then made a guest appearance in his music video for "Top Model", from the 2017 maxi single Plus. They made their relationship public in 2019. In April 2021, during an Instagram Live session following a month of inactivity, she denied online rumors that she was pregnant, saying she had nothing to conceal. In July 2021, Mulanga again drew public attention after announcing a pregnancy via Instagram Stories, which prompted speculation that Innoss'B was the father. The announcement appeared around the same time as the release of their joint single "No No", which led some social media users to suspect the pregnancy was announced for promotional purposes. She rejected these claims and asserted that her pregnancy was unrelated to promotional activity and that she chose to address the subject directly to avoid misinformation. Mulanga later appeared publicly with Innoss'B in October 2021 at his concert at Village Chez Ntemba in Kinshasa, where her noticeably advanced pregnancy attracted further attention. In December 2021, Innoss'B told reporters at a press conference that details regarding the pregnancy were private. In January 2022, during a media tour in the Ivory Coast, he confirmed that he and Mulanga were expecting a child, and referred to her as his girlfriend as well as suggesting an engagement. Their daughter, Amuleto, was born on 19 February 2022. In September 2023, following a joint performance in Kinshasa, she unfollowed Innoss'B on social media and restricted, as well as deleting content linking them. When asked about a possible breakup, she jokingly suggested that the relationship had never been official. She later re-followed Innoss'B, and they made further public appearances together, including online, following their reconciliation.By early 2024, signs of separation appeared as they traveled separately to the Flammes Awards in Paris, ceased promoting each other's work, and reports suggested Innoss'B had unfollowed her on Instagram. Early in 2025, Innoss'B's frequent social media appearances with Gabonese singer Emma'a sparked speculation of a new relationship, while a video showing him closely interacting with singer Anita Mwarabu, often described as Mulanga's musical rival, stirred additional controversy. Neither artist publicly commented on their relationship status. By November 2025, their separation was confirmed following the leak of a court document indicating custody proceedings for their daughter.

== Discography ==
=== Singles ===
Year	Title	Details
2018	"Coeur fragile"	Single, Released: 30 July 2018; Label: FG Production
2019	"Ni Nani"	Single, Released: 1 March 2019; Label: FG Production
2019	"Biloko"	Single, Released: 13 December 2019; Label: FG Production; Composer: Ferré Gola
2020	"Mbote"	Single, Released: 5 September 2020; Label: FG Production
2021	"Pepele"	Single, Released: 30 June 2021 Label: GK Projects
2022	"Contaminée"	Single, Released 15 October 2022; Label: Maisha Soul Records
2023	"Mukaji Internationale"	Single: Released 8 March 2023; Maisha Soul Records
2024	"Choquer"	Single: Released 15 March 2024; Label: Mboté Music/Wèrè Wèrè Music

== Awards and nominations ==
Year	Event	Prize	Recipient	Result	Ref.
2021	AFRIMA	Best Female in Central Africa	Herself	Nominated	
2021	AFRIMA	Best Artiste in African Dance or Choreography	"Mbote"	Nominated	
2021	AFRIMA	Most Promising African Artiste	Herself	Nominated	
2023	Prix Lokumu	Best Female Urban Artist	Herself	Won	
2026	AFRIMA	Best Female Artist in Central Africa	Herself	Nominated	
2026	AFRIMA	Best African Dance/Choreography	"Mobambo"	Nominated	
