= Zuchu =

Tanzanian singer and songwriter from Zanzibar

- Also known as: Zuchu
- Born: Zuhura Othman Soud; 22 November 1993 (age 32); Zanzibar, Tanzania
- Genres: Bongo flava, Baibuda
- Occupations: Singer-songwriter, dancer, actress
- Instrument: Vocals
- Years active: 2020–present
- Label: WCB Wasafi
- Spouse: Diamond Platnumz (m. 2025)

Zuhura Othman Soud, better known by her stage name Zuchu (born 22 November 1993), is a Tanzanian singer and songwriter, in Zanzibar. She is currently based in Dar es Salaam and is signed to the WCB Wasafi record label.

== Early life ==
Zuchu hails from a prominent musical family in Zanzibar, Tanzania, known for their contributions to Swahili music. Her mother is renowned taarab musician Khadija Kopa. Her father, Othman Soud, was a songwriter for Khadija Kopa and the celebrated TOT Band during its peak. He later became a police officer.

Through her mother, Zuchu met Diamond Platnumz, the founder of the Wasafi label, leading to an audition with him. During this audition, she performed two songs, including a rendition of "Wana" which subsequently became her debut single. Her performance earned her a place in WCB Wasafi.

== Career ==
Zuchu started singing at a young age and later collaborated with her mother Khadija Kopa on a song titled "Mauzauza" from her debut EP I am Zuchu. Her first appearances as a musician to the public date back to 2015. She performed amongst others in the first edition of TECNO OWN THE STAGE in Lagos, Nigeria, at which she auditioned together with Tanzanian singer, Nandy.

In 2022, Zuchu became the most subscribed female artist in Sub Saharan Africa on Youtube. A few months later she became the first female artist in East Africa to reach 100 million streams on Boomplay.

In 2022, Zuchu became the first female artist in East Africa to earn a nomination at the MTV EMAs.

Zuchu started 2023 with a new single titled "Utaniua." It was critically acclaimed, and Tanzanian music journalist Charles Maganga appreciated it as an intimate song where Zuchu pays homage to Bongo Flava and Baibuda.

In March 2023, Zuchu released her first official music video for the year 2023 for a new single titled "Napambana".

In June 2023, Zuchu announced that she had surpassed 500 million views on Youtube, making her the first female artist in East Africa and the fifth female artist in Africa to achieve this milestone.

In 2023, Zuchu's 2021 hit "Sukari" was positioned at number 8 by NotJustOk on their list of the best Tanzanian songs of the decade, ranging from 2012 to 2022.

== Awards ==
In July 2020, Zuchu was awarded the Silver Plaque Button by YouTube for hitting 100,000 subscribers. She became the first East African female artist to reach that milestone within a week. She also became the first East African female artist to reach 1 million subscribers on YouTube 11 months later.

In November 2020, Zuchu was named by AFRIMMA as the Emerging Artist Award winner.

In February 2023, Zuchu received five nominations at the Soundcity MVP Awards, where she also performed.

In April 2023, Zuchu won five awards at the Tanzania Music Awards.

== Personal life ==
In November 2022, Zuchu publicly acknowledged her romantic relationship with Diamond Platnumz.

In August 2026, Zuchu gave birth to a bouncing baby girl, Diamond Platnumz being the father of the child.

== Discography ==
=== Albums ===
Zuchu released her debut EP album I Am Zuchu in 2020, with a total of seven songs.

- 2020: I Am Zuchu
- 2024: Peace and Money

=== Singles and collaborations ===
Year	Title	Album
2025	"Afande" (with Dogo Paten) "Hapo" (with G Nako) "Jembe" "Oktoba Tunatiki" "Amanda" (solo or remix with Spice) "Inama" (feat. Diamond Platnumz)	Non-album singles
2024	"Till I Die" (feat. Spyro) "Lollipop" (feat. Yemi Alade) "Mwizi" "Antenna" "Makonzi" "Lullaby" (feat. Majeed) "I Don't Care" "Cherie" (feat. Lava Lava) "Tinini" (feat. H_Art the Band) "Mama" "Nimechoka" "Wale Wale" (feat. Diamond Platnumz) "Hujanizidi" (feat. D Voice)	Peace and Money
2021	"Yalah" "Nyumba ndogo" "Sukari"	Non-album singles
2020	"Cheche" (feat. Diamond Platnumz) "Litawachoma" (feat. Diamond Platnumz) "Side2side" "Hakuna Kulala" "Nisamehe" "Kwaru" "Wana" "Raha" "Ashua"(feat. Mbosso) "Mauzauza"(feat. Khadija Kopa)	I Am Zuchu
2020	"Tanzania ya Sasa" "Shangilia" "Hasara" "Nobody" (feat. Joe Boy) "Number One" (Feat. Rayvanny)	Non-album singles
