= Vanessa Mdee =

Tanzanian recording artist and television personality (born 1988)

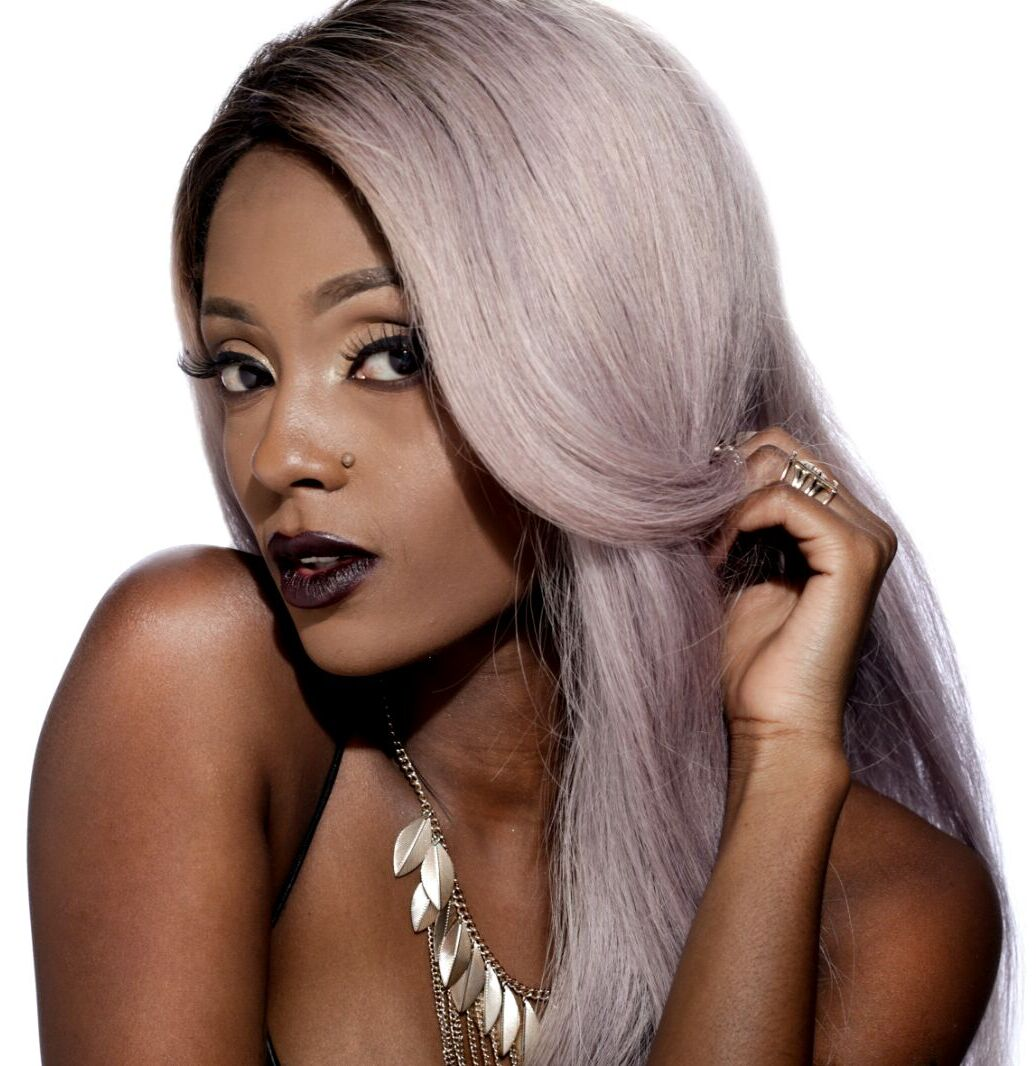
- Born: Vanessa Hau Mdee; 7 June 1988 (age 38); Arusha, Tanzania
- Other name: Vee Money
- Occupations: Singer; rapper; VJ; television personality; radio host
- Years active: 2007–2020
- Partner: Rotimi
- Children: 2
- Musical career
- Genres: R&B; Afro pop; hip-hop; bongo flava
- Instrument: Vocals
- Labels: B'hits Music Group; Universal Music Group
- Website: vanessamdee.com

Vanessa Hau Mdee (born 7 June 1988) is a former Tanzanian recording artist, MTV VJ (video jockey), television personality and radio host. She hosted Epic Bongo Star Search and Dume Challenge for ITV Tanzania before signing to B'Hits Music Group in late 2012.

In 2015 and 2016, Mdee released three singles ("Nobody But Me", "Never Ever", and "Niroge"). In 2018, she was signed to Universal Music Group.

During her Deep Dive With Vanessa Mdee Podcast in 2020, Mdee announced that she was quitting the music industry, citing pressure and depression.

Mdee returned to music in May 8th, 2026 with a gospel song, a rendition of How Great Thou Art, a hymn. She now identifies herself as a born-again Christian woman.

== Early life and education ==
Mdee was born on 7 June 1988 in Arusha, Tanzania, and was raised in Arusha, Nairobi, Paris, and New York. She attended Arusha Modern High School for her secondary education. Mdee attended the Catholic University of Eastern Africa to pursue a law degree.

== Career ==
=== 2007: MTV VJ Search ===
In early 2007, Mdee auditioned for the MTV VJ Search in Dar es Salaam. Afterwards, she joined Carol and Kule to host the Coca-Cola Chart Express. By 2008, Mdee had established herself in Tanzania, hosting shows in Nigeria, South Africa, Kenya, Mozambique, Angola, Uganda, and the Democratic Republic of Congo.

=== 2008: MTV Staying Alive ===
In 2008, Mdee worked with the Staying Alive Foundation on a personally important project; she got to visit the Uwanja wa Fisi with then–Staying Alive Foundation Special Ambassador Kelly Rowland. Mdee also joined Malaria No More in their Z!nduka Campaign, a campaign aimed at the eradication of malaria.

=== 2009: Senses, Sounds and Wisdom ===
In early 2009, Mdee hosted Senses, Sounds and Wisdom with Zantel during the annual Sauti za Busara International Music Festival, showcasing Swahili culture.

=== 2011: Choice FM Tanzania and other media projects ===
In 2011, Mdee became the host of 102.5 Choice FM's The Hitlist.

Along with her pan-African weekly TV show, MTV's Base Select 10, and daily radio gig, Mdee blogged as a roving reporter on behalf of MTV Staying Alive and UNAIDS. She was MTV's voice at the 2011 UNAIDS Mali Youth Summit in Bamako and the subsequent High Level meeting in Cape Town, South Africa. She participated in the International Conference on HIV and STI's in Addis Ababa, Ethiopia, and co-founded (along with M. K. Asante) STANDWIDTH, under the UNAIDS umbrella.

=== 2012: MTV Base Meets and music premier ===
Mdee launched her music career in 2012, working on the single "Me and You" by Ommy Dimpoz. A month later 13 January 2013 – she released her first single "Closer". These scored her four nominations at Tanzania's Music Awards (Kilimanjaro Tanzania Music Awards), including "Bongo Pop Song of the year", which she won. She also won Collaboration of the Year.

=== 2013: Global Shapers and MTV Base’s Hunters Oasis ===
In 2013, Mdee participated in the Global Shapers initiative through the Dar es Salaam hub of the World Economic Forum. In October 2013, she joined the GAVI Alliance at the United Nations General Assembly, where she spoke on a panel with Ugandan President Yoweri Museveni. The visit concluded with her ringing Nasdaq’s ceremonial closing bell alongside UNAIDS Executive Director Michel Sidibé and Malian President Ibrahim Boubacar Keïta. She subsequently received an award from Global Health and Diplomacy for her advocacy work.

Mdee hosted MTV Base's Hunters Oasis; a music festival around Africa with appearances from artists and DJs from across the African continent. She also hosted Tanzania's Epiq Bongo Star Search Season 7 and Dume Challenge, seasons 1 and 2. Mdee also released her second single "Come Over" in November 2013.

=== 2014: Music, Awards, Airtel, Coke Studio, Crown Paints, Music Tours ===
In 2014, Mdee was nominated for 3 Kilimanjaro Tanzania Music Awards for Female Artist of the Year, R&B Song of the Year and Female Performer of the Year. On 3 May 2014, she won for R&B Song of the Year for Closer. Mdee released her third single Hawajui on 13 June.

Mdee was featured in an advertisement for the "Switch On" Airtel campaign.

Mdee, alongside Nomuzi Mabena presented the Best Collaboration Award and Best Francophone Award. During the trip to Durban, South Africa, she interviewed Trey Songz, Miguel, and French Montana.

Mdee was featured in season II of Coke Studio Africa along with Nigeria's Burna Boy.

In 2014, Mdee performed at the Kili Music Tour in Mwanza and at its finale in Dar es Salaam. She also participated in the Serengeti Fiesta Music Tour, a nationwide tour that covered several regions of Tanzania; the finale was held on 18 October 2014 in Dar es Salaam and featured American rapper T.I., along with Diamond, Davido, Waje, Victoria Kimani, and Patoranking.

She later became a brand ambassador for Crown Paints in Tanzania.

Mdee was nominated for two categories, Best Female Artiste in Eastern Africa and Best African RNB & Soul, in the All Africa Music Awards. On 27 December, Mdee won the Best Female Artist in Eastern Africa award in Lagos, Nigeria.

On 8 November, Mdee joined forces with another Tanzanian singer, Barnaba Elias, for an afro pop duet, Siri. Later on 8 December, the music video for Hawajui was premiered on MTV Base.

=== 2015: Samsung, ESSENCE, ONE.org, Awards ===
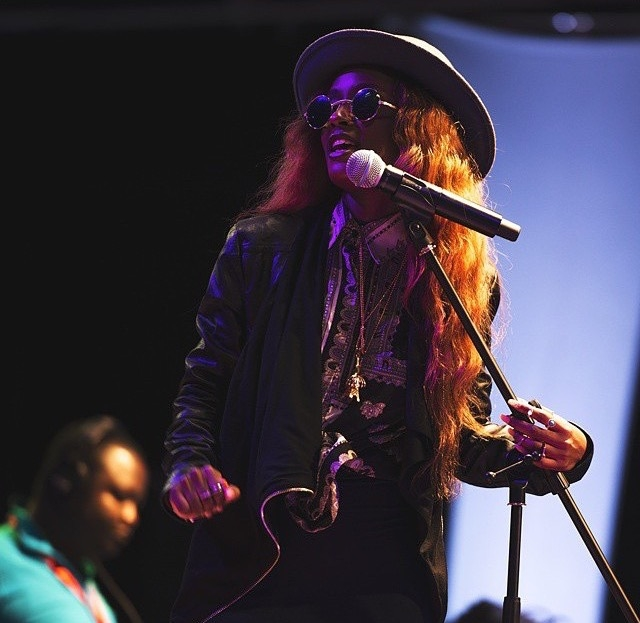
Mdee performing in 2015

Mdee signed a brand ambassadorship deal with Samsung Tanzania.

On 26 March 2015, Vanessa Mdee released her fifth single Nobody But Me featuring South African rapper K.O.

On 4 April 2015, Mdee performed in Lagos, Nigeria, at the Gidi Culture Festival, known to be the Gidi Culture Festival in Lagos, which was presented by Eclipse Live and Lagos State. The festival was held at Eko Atlantic. Vanessa Mdee shared the stage with artists including Burna Boy, Awilo Longomba, M.I, Waje, Sean Tizzle, Victoria Kimani, Efya, Skales and many more. Vanessa Mdee was the only artist representing Tanzania at the festival.

Mdee is up for three Kilimanjaro Music Awards i.e., Female Artist of the Year, Female Entertainer of the Year, and Afropop Song of the Year. The awards are set to take place 15 June 2015 in Dar es Salaam, Tanzania. Vanessa Mdee's also nominated for Favorite Female Artist at Tanzania's People's Choice Awards Tuzo Za Watu that take place on 22 May 2015 in Dar es Salaam.

On 13 May 2015, Mdee joined forces with seven songstresses to celebrate girl power. Their campaign is calling on world leaders to put girls and women in the forefront in 2015. This was the year when the new development goals were to be set by world leaders at the United Nations. Apart from Vanessa Mdee, the other artists are Victoria Kimani (Kenya), Judith Sephuma (South Africa), Waje (Nigeria), Arielle T (Gabon), Gabriela (Mozambique), Yemi Alade (Nigeria), Selomor Mtukudzi (Zimbabwe) and Blessing Nwafor. The song promotes the Poverty is Sexist Campaign globally, and will be officially launched in Nigeria, Mozambique, Zimbabwe and South Africa during the World Economic Forum for Africa and the African Union Heads of State Summit. The song is released in conjunction with a report by ONE titled, "Poverty is Sexist: Why girls and women must be at the heart of the fight to end extreme poverty". The report shows how unlocking women's economic potential could improve the lives of everyone in society. It also illustrates the structural nature of the social, economic, political and cultural barriers that militate against women and girls. On 23 June 2015, Mdee took home two KTMA Awards for Female Artist of the Year and Best Female Entertainer. The awards were held in Dar es Salaam, Tanzania – which takes place every year.

Essence a popular US magazine – hadn't shot a cover in Africa since 1978. They decided it was time. They travelled to East Africa and photographed Erykah Badu in Zanzibar, Tanzania and Nairobi, Kenya for the August issue. Vanessa Mdee features in this Essence issue where she opens up about Tanzania, her music, inspiration and many more.

=== 2016: Music, Mombasa Rocks, One Africa Music Fest, Fiesta Tour ===
The Mombasa Rocks festival was held at the Mombasa Golf Club – Kenya on 8 October 2016. Vanessa Mdee was among the headlining performers at the Mombasa Rocks festival in Kenya in October 2016.

Fiesta Tour: Vanessa, among other Tanzanian music artists, have been touring various cities in the country. Vanessa has performed in Dodoma, Morogoro, Arusha and is set to perform at the finale in Dar es Salaam.

One Africa Music Festival: Vanessa performed live at the Toyota Center – Houston on Saturday, 22 October 2016. This night featured Nigerian afrobeats stars, including Mdee.

== Mdee Music ==
In 2018, Mdee unveiled her own record label titled Mdee Music featuring her sister Mimi Mars and Brian Simba. Simba left in 2021.

=== East Africa's Got Talent ===
In July 2019, Vanessa Mdee was unveiled as one of the four pioneer judges for the debut season of East Africa's Got Talent, which began airing in August 2019.

== Money Mondays ==
Mdee released her debut album "Money Mondays" on 15 January 2018. The album consists eighteen tracks, two as bonus and sixteen as official tracks. Including Bambino ft. Reekado Banks, Cash Madame, Bounce and Kisela ft. P Squares's Peter.

The album features guest artists including Cassper Nyovest, Joh Makini, Reekado Banks, Radio & Weasel, Mohombi and Konshens.

According to Boomplay, the album was among its most streamed East-African releases.

== MTV Shuga ==
Mdee appeared on MTV Shuga Down South several episodes as Stormi the glam madam. Mdee is the first and the only Tanzanian musician to appear on the TV show.

== Personal life ==
On 25 November 2019, American actor and singer Rotimi, known for the character Andre Coleman aka “Dre” he played in Power, shared a picture of him and Mdee posing in an elevator. Rotimi told the story of how the two met at a party and hit it off. Mdee told an interview that she knew he would be her husband only two days after meeting him. The pair revealed that they both had tattoos of each other's name on their bodies; her (middle) name, Hau, on his right wrist and his name, Rotimi, on her chest. They also have matching tattoos of the number 1045 on their wrists.

In December 2020, Mdee announced her engagement to Rotimi by posting a video of her diamond ring on Instagram. On 29 September 2021, they welcomed a son. They also have a daughter.

Mdee is also the older sister to Mimi Mars, also a Tanzanian singer, actress and TV host. The two sisters have a close relationship.

== Discography ==
Title	Album details
Money Mondays	Released: 15 January 2018; Label: Mdee Music; Formats: CD, digital download
Expensive	TBA

== Awards and nominations ==
Year	Award	Category	Nominated work	Result
2013	Tanzania Music Awards	Best New Artist		Nominated
2013	Tanzania Music Awards	Best Afro Pop	Me & You	Won
2013	Tanzania Music Awards	Best Collaboration	Me & You	Won
2014	Tanzania Music Awards	Female Artist of the Year		Nominated
2014	Tanzania Music Awards	RnB Song of the Year	Closer	Won
2014	Tanzania Music Awards	Female Performer of the Year		Nominated
2014	Tanzania People's Choice Awards	Favourite Female Video	Closer	Nominated
2014	All Africa Music Awards	Best African RnB & Soul	Come Over	Nominated
2014	All Africa Music Awards	Best Female Artiste In Eastern Africa		Won
2015	Tanzania Music Awards	Female Artist of the Year		Won
2015	Tanzania Music Awards	Afro Pop Song of the Year	Hawajui	Nominated
2015	Tanzania Music Awards	Best Female Entertainer		Won
2015	Tanzania People's Choice Awards	Female Artist of the Year		Nominated
2015	MTV Africa Music Awards	Best Female		Nominated
2015	African Muzik Magazine Awards	Best Female Artist East Africa		Won
2015	All Africa Music Awards	Best African Pop	Hawajui	Won
2015	The Future Awards Africa	Prize in Entertainment		Nominated
2015	Abryanz Style and Fashion Awards 2015	Most Stylish Female Artist East Africa		Won
2015	Africa Entertainment Awards ( Canada)	Best International Female Artist Africa		Won
2015	Africa Entertainment Awards (USA)	Best Female Artist Africa		Nominated
2016	Kora Awards	Best Female Artist – East Africa		Pending
2016	Nigeria Entertainment Awards	Best Female Artist ( Non Nigerian)		Nominated
2016	Africa Magazine Muzik Awards	Best Female East Africa		Nominated
2016	Africa Entertainment Awards (USA)	Best Female artist		Nominated
2016	MTV Africa Music Awards	Best Female		Nominated
2016	Abryanz Style and Fashion Awards 2016	Most Stylish Female Artiste (East Africa)		Won
