= African Muzik Magazine Awards =

Annual African music award ceremony

- Current: 8th African Muzik Magazine Awards
- Description: Outstanding achievements in music
- Country: United States
- Presented by: Big A Entertainment
- First award: 2014
- Website: www.afrimma.com

The African Muzik Magazine Awards (commonly abbreviated as AFRIMMA) are an annual African music awards ceremony aimed at rewarding and celebrating musical works, talents, and creativity around the African continent and accommodate all musical genres, including Afrobeats, Afro-Trap, Assiko, Bongo, Coupé-décalé, Genge, Highlife, Kwaito, Congolese rumba, ndombolo, and Soukous.

== History ==
The event was founded by Nigerian businessman Anderson Obiagwu and is presented by Big A Entertainment. The first awards ceremony took place in July 2014 at the Eisemann Center in Richardson, Texas.

== Categories ==
The awards consist of 28 prizes overseeing the achievements of African artists within their specific regions of origin and the genre-based continental awards.

- Best Male East Africa
- Best Female East Africa
- Best Newcomers
- Artist Of The Year
- Best Live Act
- Best Female Rap Act
- Best Male Rap Act
- Best Collaboration
- Song Of The Year
- Best Video Director
- Best DJ Africa
- Best African DJ Usa
- Afrimma Video Of The Year
- Music Producer Of The Year
- Best African Dancer
- Personality Of The Year
- Best Male Central Africa
- Best Female Central Africa
- Best Male Southern Africa
- Best Female Southern Africa
- Best Male North Africa
- Best Female North Africa
- Best Male West Africa
- Best Female West Africa
- Crossing Boundaries With Music Award
- Best Gospel
- Best Francophone
- Best Lusophone
