= Mbosso =

Tanzanian singer from Pwani Region, Tanzania

- Also known as: Mbosso
- Born: Mbwana Yusuf Kilungi; 3 October 1995 (age 30); Kibiti, Pwani Region, Tanzania
- Origin: Pwani Region
- Genres: Bongo flava; Afro pop
- Occupations: Singer; songwriter; actor; guitarist
- Instruments: Vocals; guitar
- Years active: 2013–present
- Label: WCB Wasafi

Mbwana Yusuf Kilungi (born 3 October 1995), better known by his stage name Mbosso Khan, is a Tanzanian singer and songwriter born in Kibiti, Pwani Region. He is currently based in Dar es Salaam. He is known for his songs "Nadekezwa" and "Hodari", which won Video of the Year at HiPipo Awards 2019. Mbosso released his debut studio album, Definition of Love, in March 2021.

== Early life ==
Mbosso was born and raised in Masai Boya, a small town in Tanzania on 3 October 1995. His mother is Hadija Salom Kikaali, and his father is Yusufu Mbwana Kilungi.

== Career ==
Mbosso started his music career as one of four members of Yamoto Band between 2013 and 2015. At that time his stage name was "Maromboso". The group was named best band of 2015 at Kilimanjaro Music Awards. The group disbanded in 2015.

In 2018 Mbosso was signed to WCB Wasafi, a record label founded by Diamond Platnumz where he re-launched his music career as a solo artist and released songs including "Maajabu", "Picha Yake", "Tamu" and "Tamba".

In 2020, Mbosso hit 1 million subscribers on YouTube and became one of the four Tanzanian musicians with over a million subscribers. He was awarded the YouTube Golden Plaque.

In 2021, Mbosso released his debut studio album, Definition of Love. It was released on 9 March and featured artists such as Diamond Platnumz, Njenje Band, Mr Flavour, Rayvanny, Liya, Darassa, Spice Diana and Baba Levo.

Mbosso released his first EP in November 2022, titled Khan, which was described by Peter Choge from Music In Africa as a beautiful collection of romantic love songs.

The EP is also one of the most streamed Tanzanian EPs on Boomplay, having acquired more than 50 million streams on the platform.

In 2023, Mbosso became one of the few Tanzanian artists to clock 200 million streams on Boomplay.

== Discography ==
Albums

- Definition of Love
- Khan (EP)

Singles

| Title | Year of release |
|---|---|
| "Watakubali" | 2018 |
| "Nimekuzoea" | 2018 |
| "Hodari" | 2018 |
| "Nadekezwa" | 2018 |
| "Tamu" | 2018 |
| "Nipepee" | 2018 |
| "Picha Yake" | 2018 |
| "Tamba" | 2019 |
| "Shilingi" | 2019 |
| "Maajab" | 2019 |
| "Sina nyota" | 2020 |
| "Haijakaa Sawa" | 2020 |
| "Amepotea" | 2023 |
| "Sitaki" | 2023 |
| "Mama Samia" | 2023 |
| "Limevuja" | 2023 |
| "Sele" | 2023 |
