= Rayvanny =

Tanzanian singer-songwriter

- Also known as: Vannyboy; Chui
- Born: Raymond Shaban Mwakyusa; 22 August 1993 (age 33); Nzovwe, Mbeya Region, Tanzania
- Origin: Tukuyu, Mbeya Region
- Genres: Bongo flava; afro-pop
- Occupations: Singer, songwriter, dancer
- Instruments: Vocals, piano, guitar, drums
- Years active: 2011–present
- Labels: WCB Wasafi (former); Next Level Music (current)

Raymond Shaban Mwakyusa (born 22 August 1993), better known by his stage name Rayvanny, is a Tanzanian singer, songwriter and musician who was signed under the WCB Wasafi record label until July 2022. He was born and raised in Nzovwe ward of Mbeya city, located in Mbeya Region. He is the most successful bongo flava musician in Tanzania from Mbeya region. His songs are mainly in Swahili. He is also the founder and CEO of Next Level Music. Rayvanny is best known by his song "Kwetu", which introduced him to the world. Rayvanny was mentioned by MTV Base among "Acts To Look Out For" in 2017.

Later on August 1, 2022, a Colombian version of his song, Mama Tetema he made collaborating with a Colombian musician, Maluma won him an award in EAEA People's Choice, Best Global Collaboration category on East Africa Arts Entertainment Awards (EAEA)

Rayvanny was nominated for a Grammy Award in the Best Latin Pop Album category for his collaboration with Colombian singer Maluma on their song “Mama Tetema” which was originally made by Rayvanny featuring Diamond Platnumz being produced by S2Kizzy. This song also featured on Maluma's album “Don Juan”, which was released in May 2023.

== Career ==
In 2011, when Rayvanny was still in high school, he realized his passion for music. He won a rap freestyle competition. In 2012 he joined a music group called Tip Top Connection, where he got more experience in his music career and connected with a lot of artists.

In 2015 he decided to officially join one of the biggest record labels, WCB Wasafi Records, which is managed and under the leadership of Diamond Platnumz. He released his first song, "Kwetu", in 2016. It became a hit in East Africa.

In 2016, Rayvanny was nominated for an MTV Africa Music Award in the category of Breakthrough Act 2016. In 2017 he was also nominated for several music awards, such as AEUSA for Best New Talent, Uganda Entertainment Award for Best African Act, and BET Award for International Viewers' Choice.

In 2021, Rayvanny founded his own record label, Next Level Music and signed his first artist called Mac Voice.

In November 2021, Rayvanny collaborates with Maluma on the title "Mama Tetema". "Mama Tetema" was certified Disco de Oro in 2022 by RIAA.

In July 2022, He left WCB to focus on his own record label, Next Level Music.

In 2024, he toured UK with Claudia Naisabwa as MC.

Rayvanny holds several notable records including the record of being the first Tanzanian / African act to perform at the stage of MTV EMA, first Tanzanian act to clock 100 Million streams on Boomplay and the only Tanzanian artist to ever win a BET Award.

== Discography ==
Since his debut in 2016 under WCB Wasafi, Rayvanny has released one album and a total of five EPs.

Singles
Song title	Year	Ref.
"Kwetu"	2016	
"Natafuta Kiki"	2016	
"Sugu"	2017	
"Mbeleko"	2017	
"Shikwambi"	2017	
"Zezeta"	2017	
"Chuma Ulete"	2017	
"Unaibiwa"	2017	
"Chuchuma"	2019	
"Tetema"	2019	
"Chuchuma"	2019	
"Gimi Dat"	2019	

Collaborations
Song title	Year	Main artist	Ref.
"Salome"	2016	Diamond Platnumz featuring Rayvanny	
"Kijuso"	2017	Queen Darleen featuring Rayvanny	
"Zilipendwa"	2017	WCB Wasafi Artists (Rayvanny, Rich Mavoko, Diamond Platnumz, Mbosso, Harmonize, Lava Lava, Queen Darleen)	
"Pepeta"	2019	Nora Fatehi, Rayvanny	
Patati Patata	2021	Roki Featuring Koffi Olomide and Rayvanny	
"Pepeta"	2019	Nora Fatehi, Rayvanny	
"Mama Tetema"	2021	Maluma featuring Rayvanny	
"I Miss You"	2022	Rayvanny featuring Zuchu	
"Mapopo"	2022	Mavokali featuring Rayvanny	
"Oh Mama! TETEMA"	2025	Nora Fatehi, Rayvanny, Shreya Ghoshal	

== Awards and nominations ==
Rayvanny awards and nominations
Awards and nominations
Award	Wins	Nominations

Totals (Note: Certain award groups do not simply award one winner. They acknowledge several different recipients, have runners-up, and have third place. Since this is a specific recognition and is different from losing an award, runner-up mentions are considered wins in this award tally. For simplification and to avoid errors, each award in this list has been presumed to have had a prior nomination.)
- Wins: 2
- Nominations: 3

=== MTV Africa Music Awards ===
Year	Nominee / work	Award	Result
2016	Himself	Breakthrough Act	Nominated

=== BET Awards ===
Year	Nominee / work	Award	Result
2017	Himself	International Viewers' Choice Award	Won

=== African Muzik Magazine Awards ===
Year	Nominee / work	Award	Result
2017	Himself	Best Newcomer	Nominated

=== Afrimma ===
Year	Nominee / work	Award	Result
2022	Himself	Best Male East Africa	Won
