= Sombetini =

Ward in Arusha City Council of the Arusha Region of Tanzania

Sombetini Kata ya Sombetini (Swahili)
- Ward in Arusha City
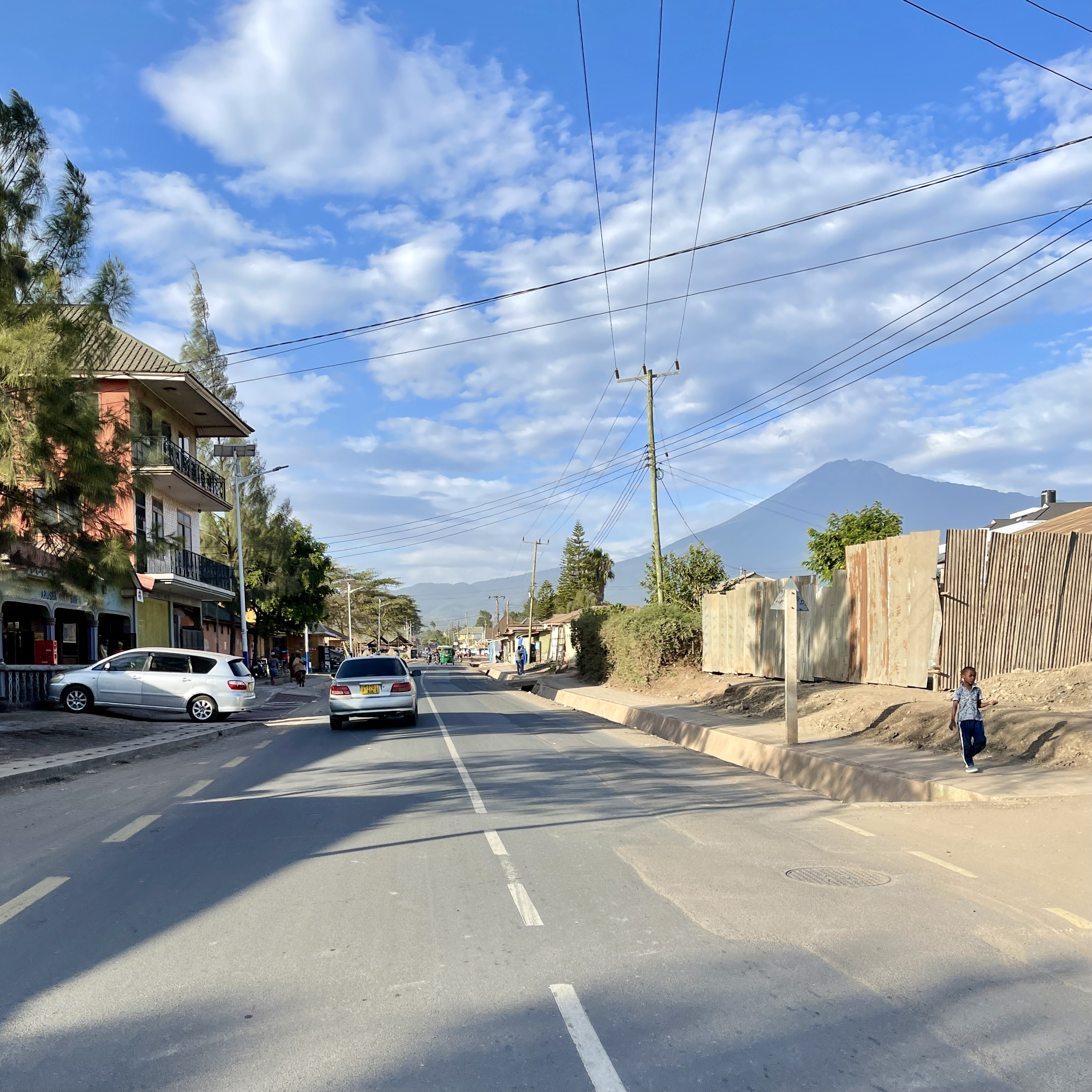
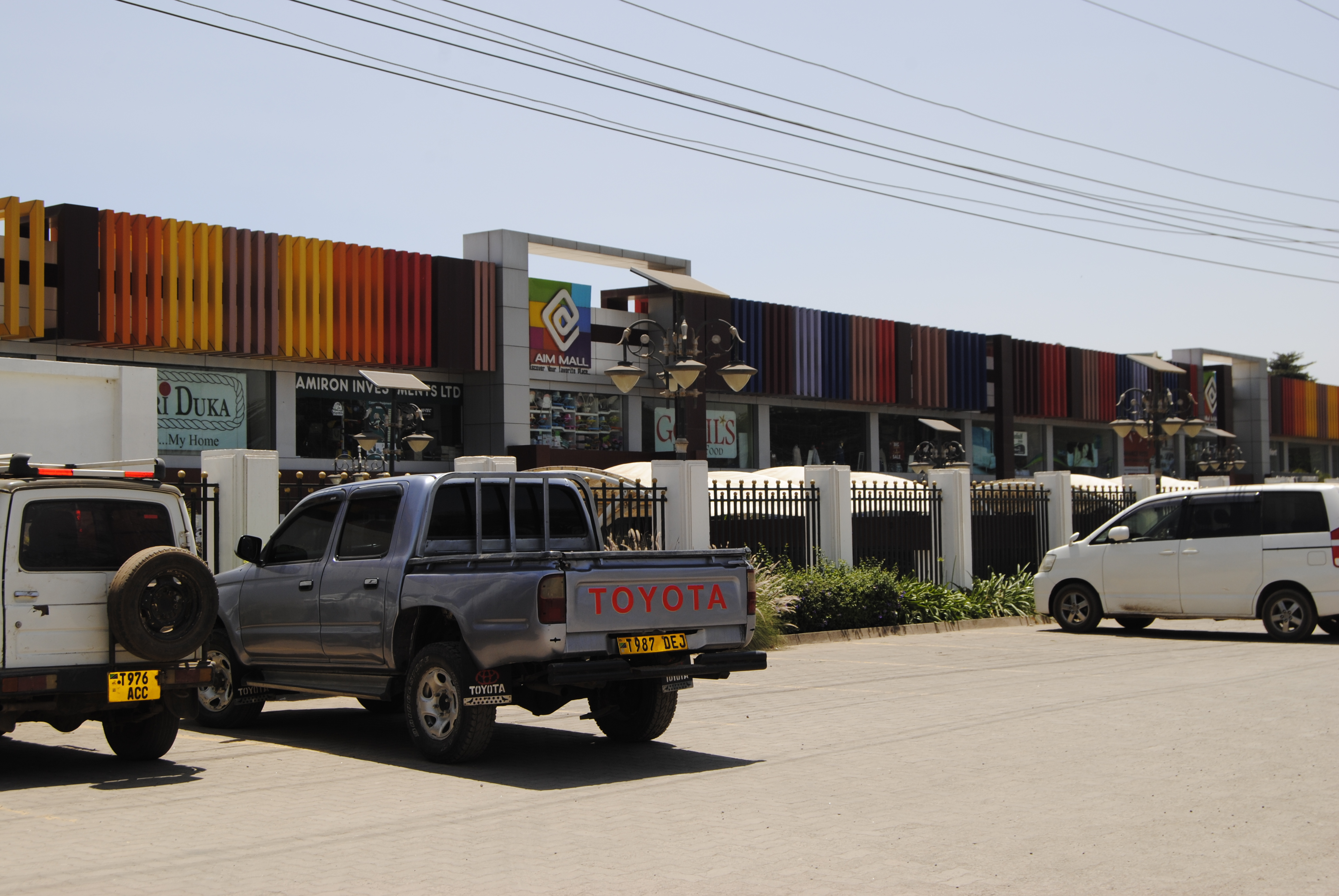
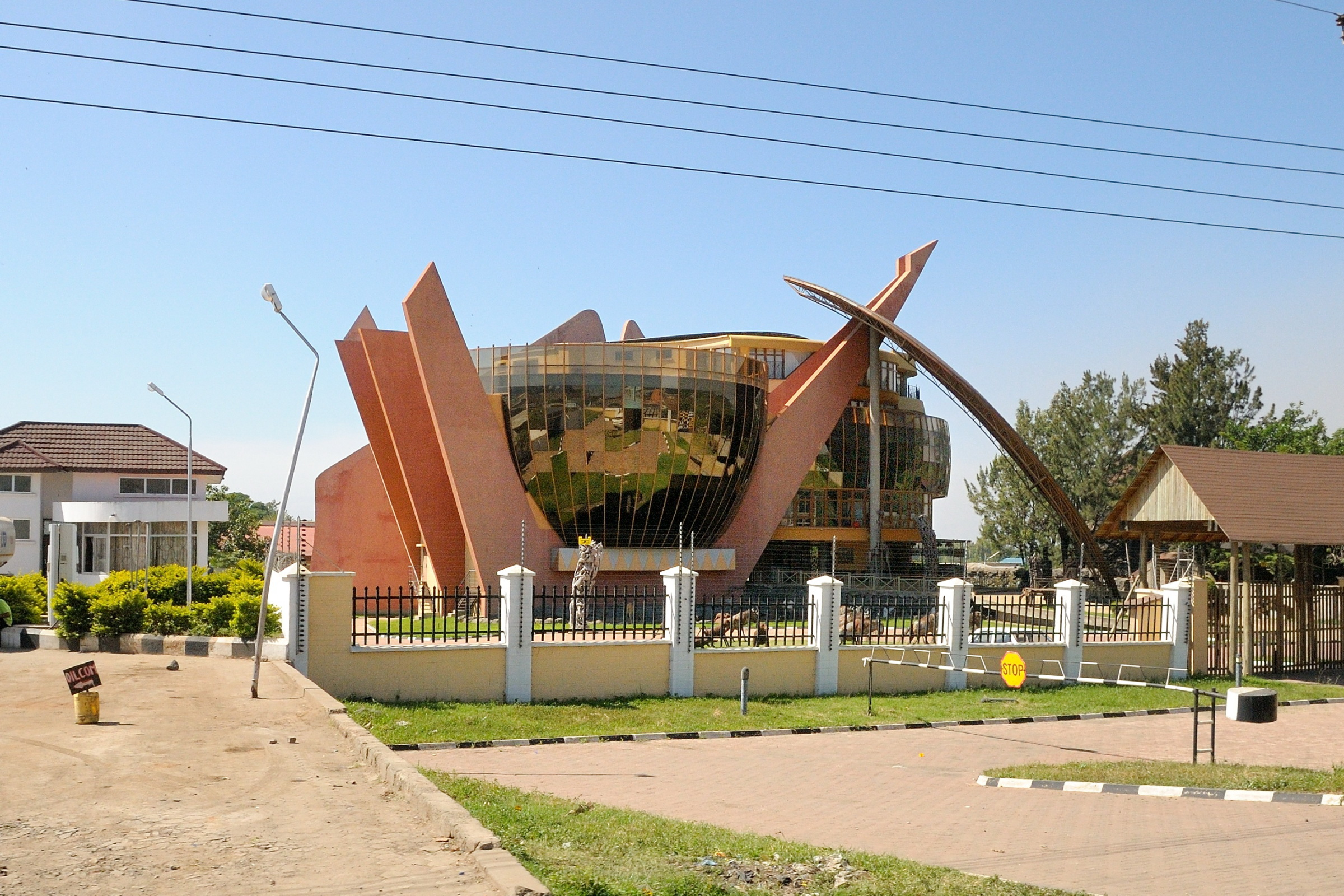
- From top to bottom: Streetscape in Sombetini, Aim Mall in Sombetini

- Location within Tanzania
- Coordinates: 3°23′11.94″S 36°40′2.64″E
- Country: Tanzania
- Region: Arusha Region
- District: Arusha City Council
- Headquarters: Simanjiro Neighborhood

Area
  - Total: 5.173 km^{2} (1.997 sq mi)
- Elevation: 1,348 m (4,423 ft)

Population (2012)
  - Total: 48,268
  - Density: 9,331/km^{2} (24,170/sq mi)
- Demonym: Sombetinian

Ethnic groups
  - Settler: Waarusha, Iraqw & Meru
  - Ancestral: Kinongo
- Tanzanian Postal Code: 23116

Sombetini (Kata ya Sombetini, in Swahili) is one of the 19 administrative wards of the Arusha City Council located in the Arusha Region of Tanzania. The ward is bordered by Elerai ward to the north, Unga Limited and Sokon I wards to the east. The wards of Olasiti and Terrat are located in to west and south respectively. The ward covers an area of 5.173 km^{2} (1.997 sq mi), According to the 2012 census, the ward had a total population of 48,268.

== Geography ==
The ward has an elevation of 1,348 m (4,423 ft).

== Economy ==
The southern part of Sombetini ward is home to the Arusha City Goat Market, the largest goat market in Arusha Region. Other notable economic activities are the Mbauda Market, also one of the largest trading centers in the city. Additionally, the ward is home to the Arusha Cultural Heritage Center and Gallery. Morombo goat barbeque street is one of the top attractions in the ward.

== Administration ==
The postal code for Sombetini Ward is 23116. The ward is divided into the following neighbourhoods:

- Kirika A, Sombetini
- Kirika B, Sombetini
- Olamuriaki, Sombetini
- Osunyai, Sombetini
- Simanjiro, Sombetini

== Education and health ==
=== Education ===
Sombetini ward is home to these educational institutions:

- Sombetini Primary School
- Sombetini Secondary School
- Imani Primary School (private)
- Green Valley School (private)
- Hady Primary School (private)
- Nakido Primary School (private)

=== Healthcare ===
Sombetini ward is home to the following health institutions:

- Sombetini Health Center
