= Levolosi =

Ward of Arusha City Council in Arusha Region

Levolosi Ward Kata ya Levolosi (Swahili)
- Ward
- Kata ya Levolosi
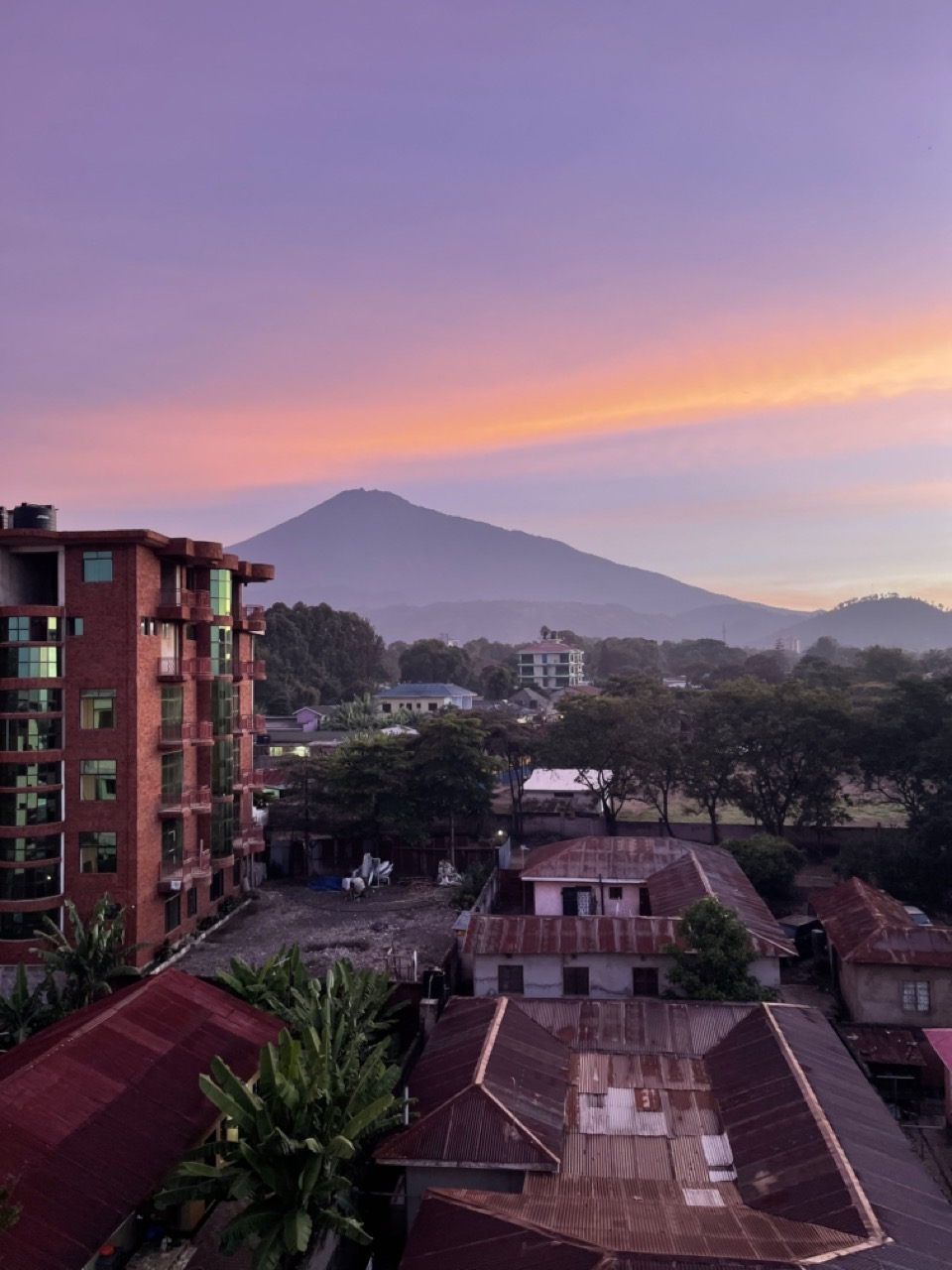
- Meru view from Levolosi Ward, Arusha City

- Location within Tanzania
- Coordinates: 3°22′6.6″S 36°40′57.72″E
- Country: Tanzania
- Region: Arusha Region
- District: Arusha District
- Capital: Levolosi Neighborhood

Area
  - Total: 1.148 km^{2} (0.443 sq mi)
- Elevation: 1,410 m (4,630 ft)

Population (2012)
  - Total: 8,838
  - Density: 7,685/km^{2} (19,900/sq mi)
- Demonym: Levolosian

Ethnic groups
  - Settler: Waarusha & Meru
  - Ancestral: Kinongo
- Tanzanian Postal Code: 23104

Levolosi is an administrative ward in the Arusha District of the Arusha Region of Tanzania. Levolosi means "middle" in the Maasai language word olevolos. Levolosi is one of 19 urban administrative wards in the municipality. The ward is bordered by Ngarenaro ward to the west, Kaloleni ward to the northeast, Kati ward to the southeast and, Unga L.T.D ward to the south. The ward covers an area of 1.148 square kilometers. The ward is home to some one of the largest hospitals, markets and transportation hubs in the city. Levolosi is home to the Levolosi cemetery, one of the oldest in the city located next to Sheikh Amri Abeid Memorial Stadium. According to the 2012 census, the ward has a total population of 8,838.

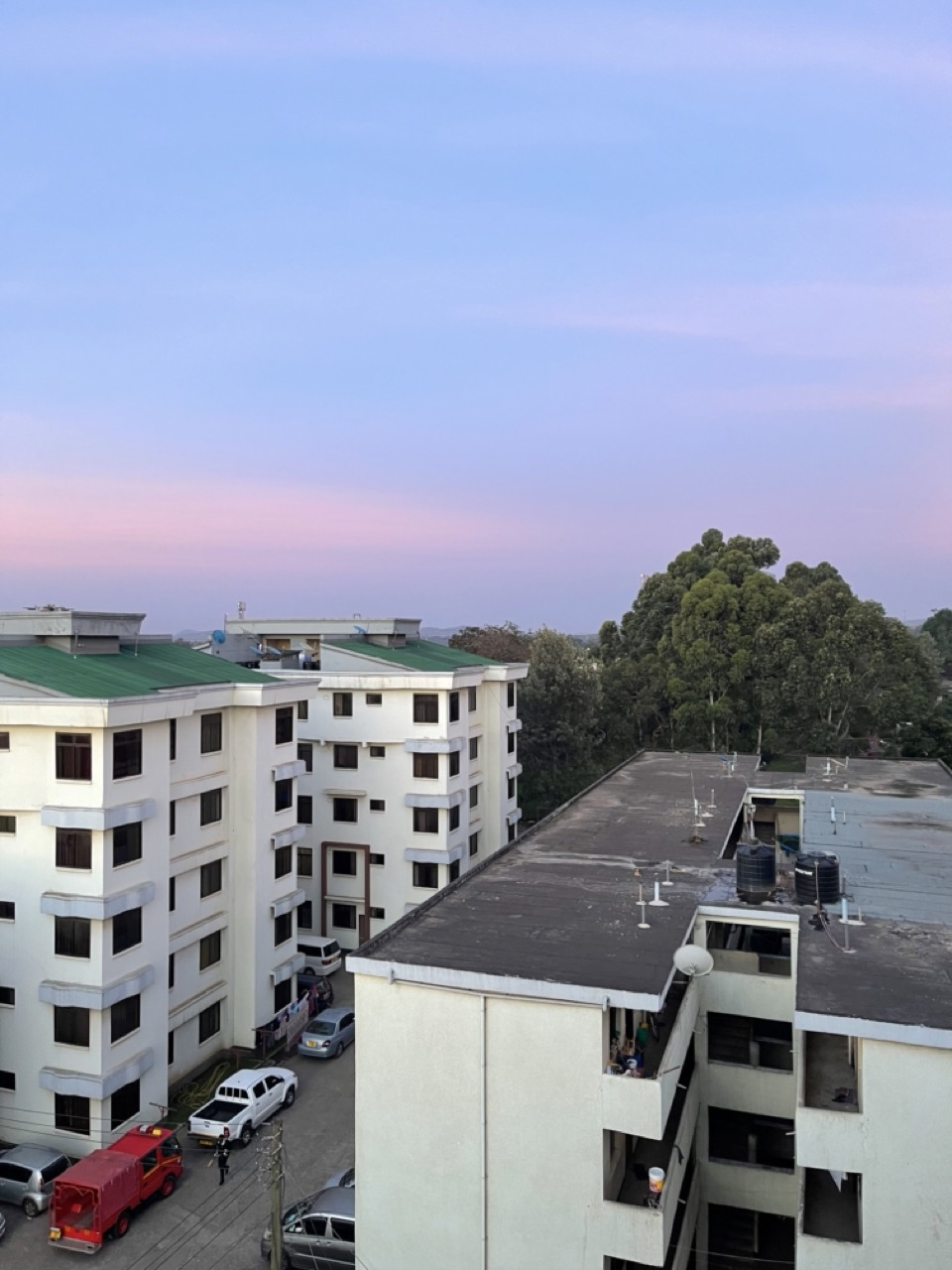
Levolosi Apartments, Levolosi Ward, Arusha City

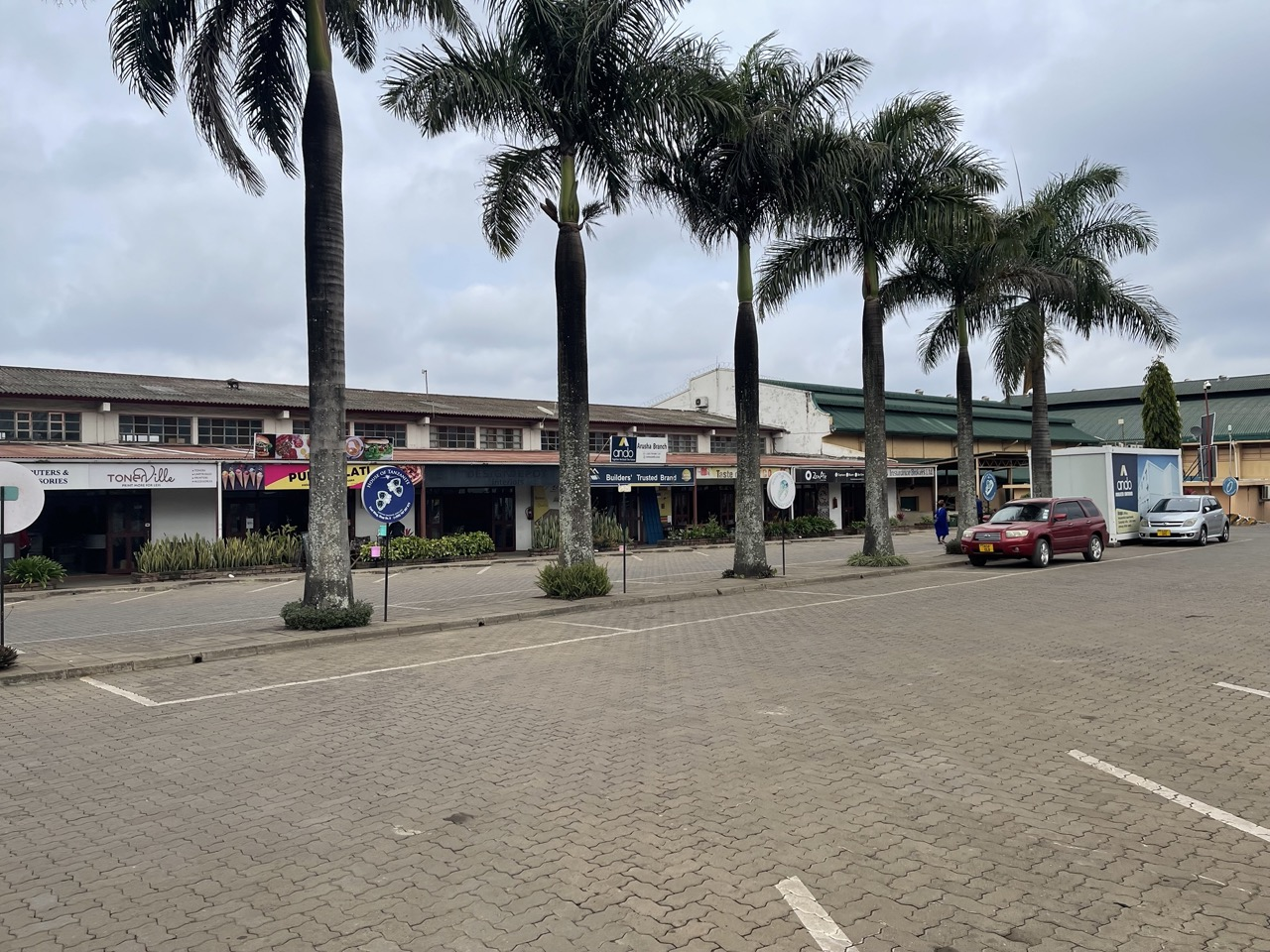
TFA Complex Mall, Levolosi Ward, Arusha City

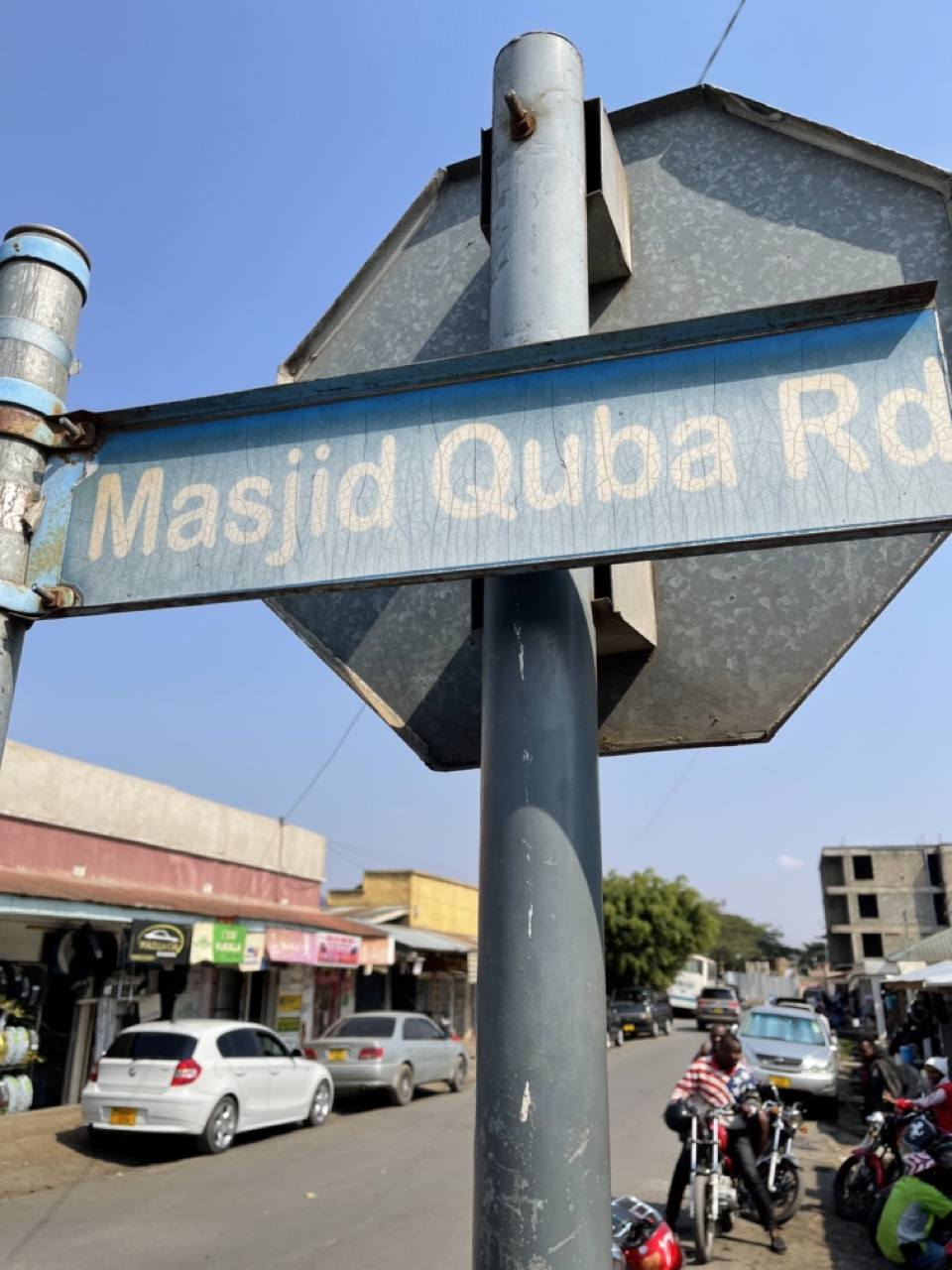
Masjid Quba St, Levolosi Ward, Arusha City

== Economy ==
Levolosi is one of the richest wards in Arusha City. The ward is home to the Arusha Lutheran Medical Center, which is the largest private hospital in the Arusha Region, thus many businesses services inside the ward often cater to the staff and patients there. Also, the Levolosi ward is home to three other hospitals that serve the ward and the city. Additionally, one of the largest government complexes in the city is located with the ward, namely; the Arusha Urban Water Supply and Sanitation Authority (AUWSA) and also the Department of Social Welfare Services for the entire Arusha region. Additionally, the regional offices for Tanzania national Road Agency (Tanroads).

However, the largest economic activity is transportation. Levolosi is the main transport hub for travel within the city. The ward is home to the Levolosi minibus Terminal also locally known as Stendi Ndogo, which is the hub for all mini-busses in the city. Also, the ward hosts Kilombero Minibus Terminal which also services travel for the neighboring wards and districts in the Arusha region. Additionally, Levolosi is home to Kilombero Market, the second-largest produce market in the city after Arusha city central market. Levolosi ward is also home to TFA Complex Mall, a large upscale open mall in Arusha City.

== Administration and neighborhoods ==
The postal code for Levolosi ward is 23104. Levolosi ward is divided into two neighborhoods:

- Majengo, Levolosi
- Levolosi, Levolosi.

=== Government ===
As in every ward in the country, Levolosi has a handful of local government buildings. The Levolosi Ward Office building houses a court as per the Ward Tribunal Act of 1988, including other vital departments for the administration the ward. The ward has the following administration offices:

- Levolosi Police Station
- Levolosi Government Office
- Levolosi Ward Tribunal (inside Levolosi Government Office)

== Education ==
Levolosi ward is home to a number of public and private schools:

- Levolosi Primary School
- Engarenarok Tetra Primary School (private)
- Engarenarok Tetra Secondary School (private)
- Arusha Meru International School (private)
- St. Augustine University, Arusha Campus (SAUT-Arusha) (private)
- Silas Hospitality College (private)
- Modern Driving School (private)

== Healthcare ==
Levolosi ward is home to the following public and private health centers:

- St. Elizabeth Hospital (private)
- Arusha Lutheran Medical Center (private)
- Levolosi Health Center
- Arusha Junior Dispensary Clinic (private)
- Faraja Dispensary Clinic (private)
