= Moshono =

Ward of Arusha City Council in Arusha Region of Tanzania

Moshono Ward Kata ya Moshono (Swahili)
- Ward
- Kata ya Moshono
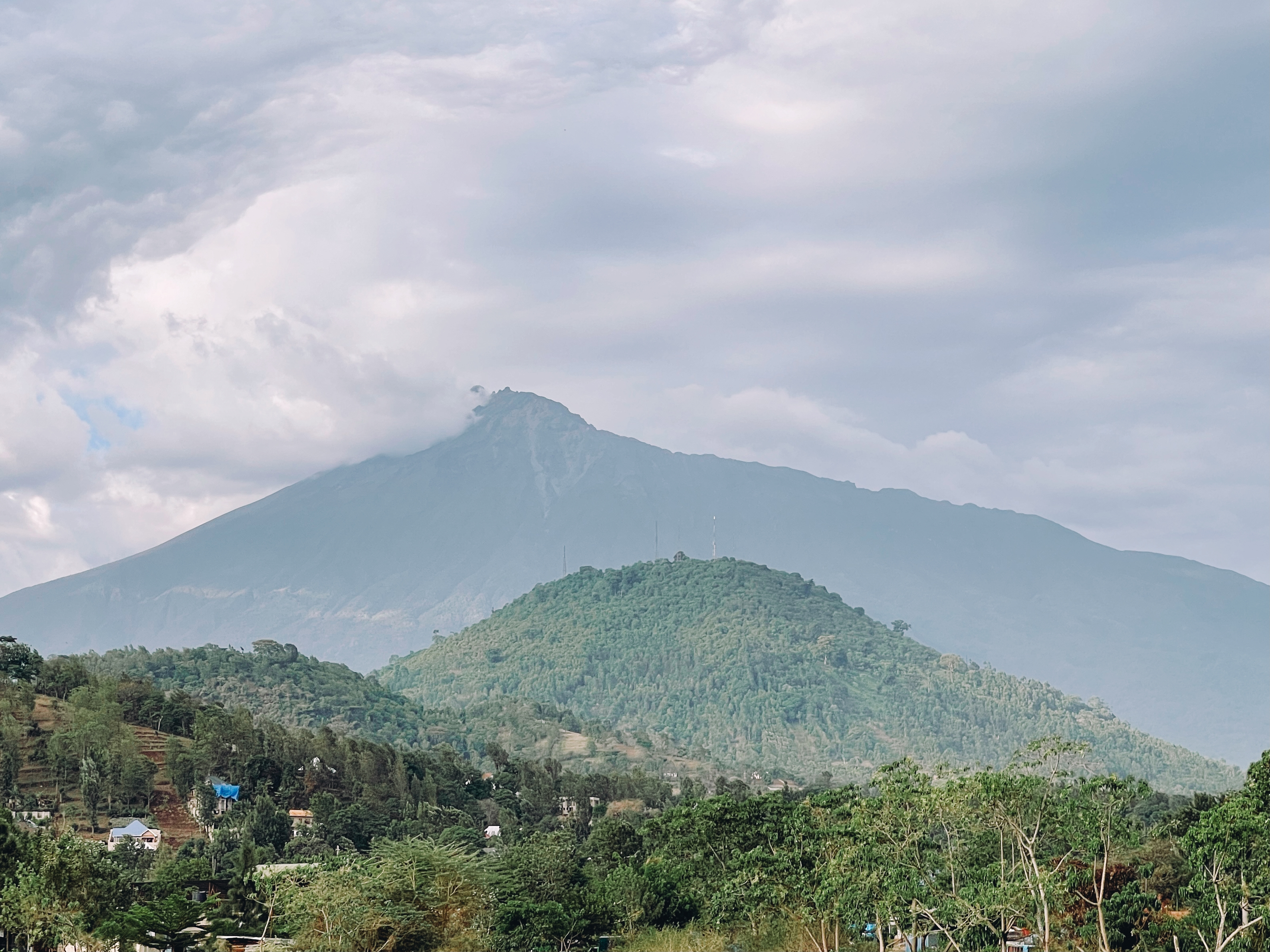
- Meru view Moshono Ward

- Location within Tanzania
- Coordinates: 3°23′58.2″S 36°44′26.52″E
- Country: Tanzania
- Region: Arusha Region
- District: Arusha District

Area
  - Total: 24.59 km^{2} (9.49 sq mi)
- Elevation: 1,297 m (4,255 ft)

Population (2012)
  - Total: 20,698
  - Density: 841.7/km^{2} (2,180/sq mi)
- Demonym: Moshonan

Ethnic groups
  - Settler: Meru
  - Ancestral: Kinongo
- Tanzanian Postal Code: 23118

Moshono is an administrative ward located in Arusha District, Arusha Region of Tanzania. It is one of 19 urban administrative wards in the municipality. Moshono ward is bordered by four wards to the north namely; Bangata, Baraa and Nkoanrua. Moshono is bordered to the west by Olorein, Themi and Engutoto wards. The ward of Mlangarini borders Moshono to the east. Moshono ward is the third largest ward in Arusha Urban District thus its mostly a rural ward with many farming communities and large schools. The ward covers an area of 24.59 km^{2} (9.49 sq mi), and has an elevation of 1,348 m (4,423 ft). According to the 2012 census, the ward had a total population of 20,698

== Economy ==
Moshono ward's economy is dominated by schools, health services, NGOs and small scale agriculture. There is a growing suburban community on its eastern borders as the wealthy residents of other wards are moving into the ward because of the attractive landscape and availability of arable land in the ward.

== Administration and neighbourhoods ==
The postal code for Moshono Ward is 23118. The ward is divided into the following neighbourhoods:

- Moivaro, Sombetini
- Moshono, Moshono
- Olkeriyan, Moshono

== Education ==
Sombetini ward is home to these educational institutions:

- St.Monica Primary School (private)
- Moshono Secondary School
- Moshono Primary School
- Arusha Modern Secondary School, Moshono Campus (private)
- Sunflower International School (private)
- Losirway Secondary School (private)
- School of St. Jude, Moivaro, Moshono Campus (private)

== Healthcare ==
Sombetini ward is home to the following health institutions:

- Moshono Health Center
- Moivaro Health Center
