= Kati, Arusha =

Ward of Arusha City Council in Arusha Region of Tanzania

Kati Ward Kata ya Kati (Swahili)
- Ward
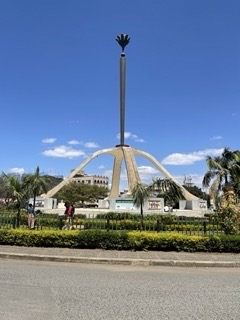
- Arusha Declaration Monument, Kati Ward
- Etymology: Center
- Location within Tanzania
- Coordinates: 3°22′26″S 36°41′18″E
- Country: Tanzania
- Region: Arusha Region
- District: Arusha District
- Capital: Pangani Neighborhood

Area
  - Total: 0.580 km^{2} (0.224 sq mi)
- Elevation: 1,400 m (4,600 ft)

Population (2012)
  - Total: 3,114
  - Density: 5,363/km^{2} (13,890/sq mi)
- Demonym: Katian

Ethnic groups
  - Settler: Swahili
  - Ancestral: Kinongo
- Tanzanian Postal Code: 23102

Kati is an administrative ward in the Arusha City Council of the Arusha Region of Tanzania. Kati means "center" in Swahili language. Kati is one of 25 urban administrative wards in the City. The ward is bordered by Levolosi ward to the west, Kaloleni ward to the north, Sekei ward to the northeast, Themi ward to the southeast, Daraja Mbili to the south and, Unga L.T.D ward to the southwest. The ward covers an area of 0.580 km^{2} (0.224 sq mi) and is the smallest ward in Arusha city.

The ward is home to some of the oldest schools in the city and some of the most iconic monuments in the city.

Kati is home to the Arusha Ijumaa Mosque (Arusha Friday Mosque), one of the oldest in the city, located south of the Arusha Declaration Monument, which is also located in Kati Ward. According to the 2012 census, the ward has a total population of 5,363.

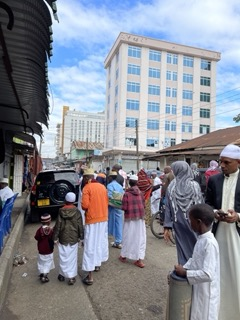
Street Scene, Kati Ward, Arusha City

== Economy ==
Kati is one of the richest wards in Arusha City. The ward is home to the Central Market, which is the largest market in the entire Arusha Region, thus many businesses get their products and supplies from there, this generates revenue for businesses based in the ward. Kati ward is home to Samunge Market, which is one the largest markets in the city. Kati being strategically located in the heart of the city, the ward is home to a number of national and international banks such as NMB Bank, Equity Bank, and Diamond Trust Bank. Thus making Kati a major financial center for the entire region.

== Administration and neighborhoods ==
The postal code for Kati Ward is 23102. The Kati ward is divided into two neighborhoods: Bondeni and Pangani.

== Monuments ==
Kati ward is home to the following city monuments:

- Arusha Declaration Monument
- Arusha Hindu Temple

== Education ==
Kati ward is home to a number of schools including historic ones:

- Arusha Secondary School (historic)
- Meru Primary School (historic)
- Uhuru Primary School (historic)
- Bondeni Secondary School (private)

== Healthcare ==
Kati ward is home to the following health institutions:

- Shree Hindu Hospital (private)
- Aga Khan Hospital Arusha city (private)
