= Themi =

Ward of Arusha City Council in Arusha Region of Tanzania

Themi Ward Kata ya Themi (Swahili)
- Ward
- Kata ya Themi
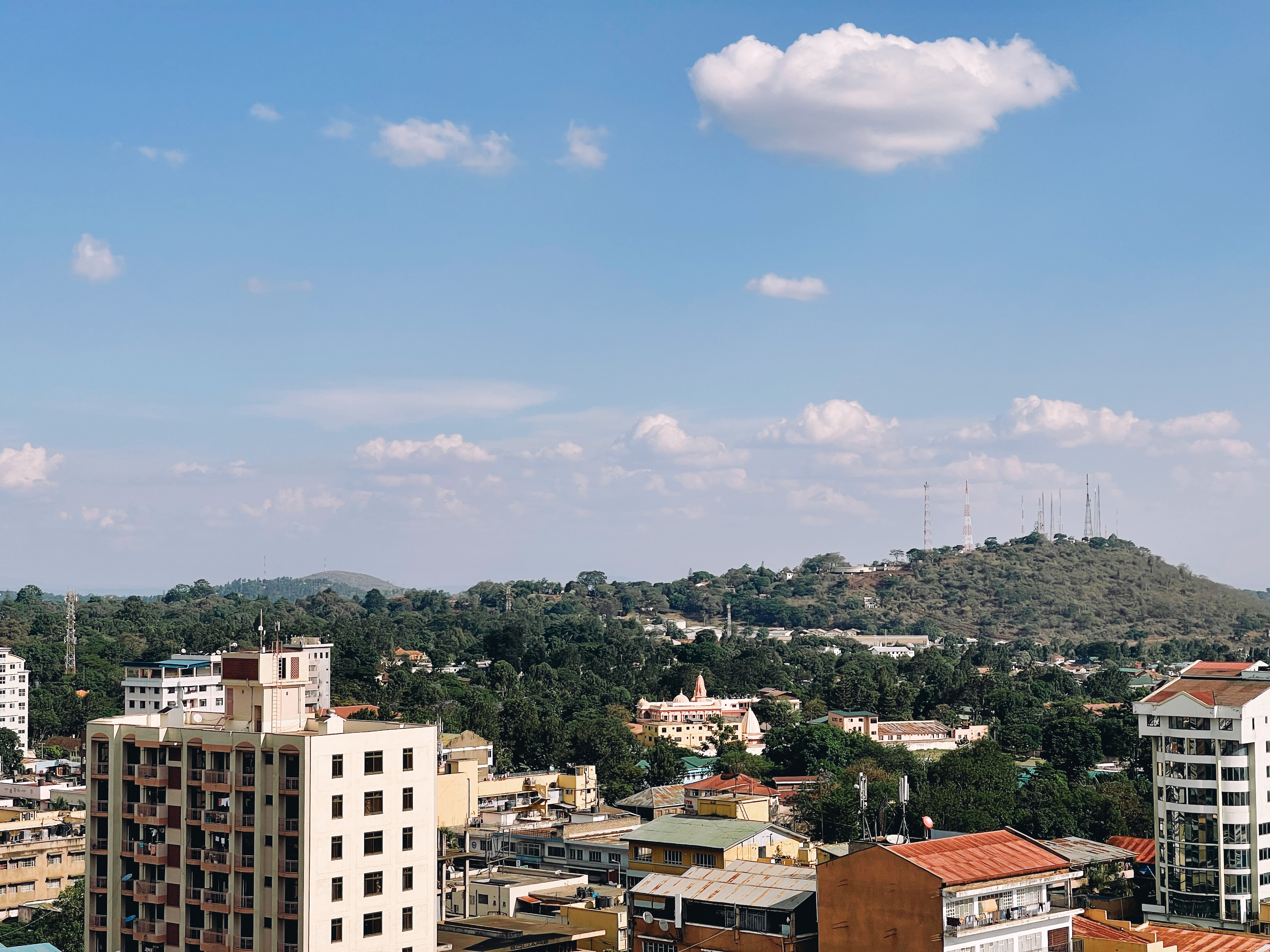
- View of Themi Hill from the northwest direction
- Nickname: "The city's hill"
- Interactive map of Themi Ward
- Coordinates: 3°23′57.12″S 36°42′18.72″E
- Country: Tanzania
- Region: Arusha Region
- District: Arusha District
- Capital: Old Police Line neighborhood

Area
  - Total: 6.200 km^{2} (2.394 sq mi)
- Elevation: 1,325 m (4,347 ft)
- Highest elevation: 1,457 m (4,780 ft)

Population (2012)
  - Total: 9,458
  - Density: 1,525/km^{2} (3,951/sq mi)
- Demonym: Themian

Ethnic groups
  - Settler: Meru
  - Ancestral: Kinongo
- Tanzanian Postal Code: 23109

Themi is an administrative ward in the Arusha District of the Arusha Region of Tanzania. It is home to Themi Hill which is 1,457 meters tall. The ward also gets its name from the hill and river which runs on its western border. Themi ward is bordered by Kati and Sekei wards to the north. Kimandolu, Moshono, Olorien wards border the ward to the east. To the south is Engutoto and Lemara wards. Lastly, to the west Themi ward is bordered by Daraja Mbili ward. The ward covers an area of 6.200 km^{2} (2.394 sq mi), and has an average elevation of 1,325 m (4,347 ft). According to the 2012 census, the ward had a total population of 9,458

== Economy ==
Themi ward is home to a number of significant manufancturing industries in the city. Tanzania Breweries Limited is the largest factory in the ward, producing product for the northern and central areas. Also Fiberboards factory is located in the ward, further employing hundreds. Sunflag Tanzania Limited factory as well as Arusha Coffee Mills, Sunkist Bakery Limited, Hanspaul Group Limited, Darsh Industries Limited and Tanelec Limited are also big employers in the ward. The north part of Themi ward is home to a high number of middle to upper class residential areas.

== Administration and neighborhoods ==
The postal code for Themi Ward is 23109. The ward is divided into the following neighborhoods:

- Aicc, Themi
- Corridor, Themi
- Old Police Line, Themi
- Themi Mashariki, Themi

== Education ==
Themi ward is home to these educational institutions:

- Themi Primary School
- Prime School (private)
- Arusha Day Secondary School
- Arusha School
- Tanganyika School Early Years (private)

== Healthcare ==
Themi ward is home to the following health institutions:

- Themi Health Center
- Total Care Health Center
- Well Point Health Center
- Kam Medical Health Center
- Old Arusha Health Center
