= Sekei, Arusha =

Ward and district capital of the Arusha City Council in the Arusha Region of Tanzania

Sekei Kata ya Sekei (Swahili)
- Ward in Arusha City
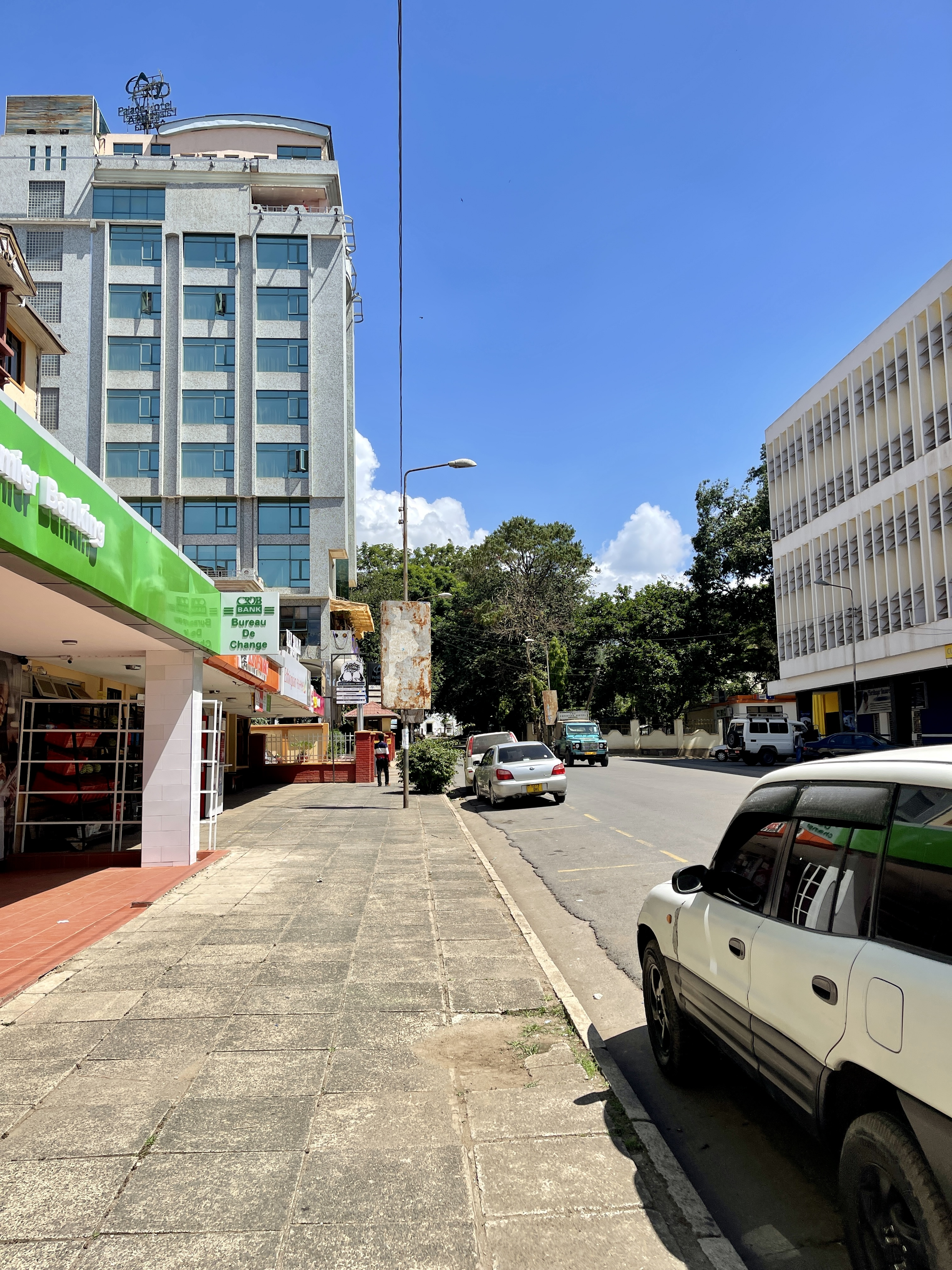
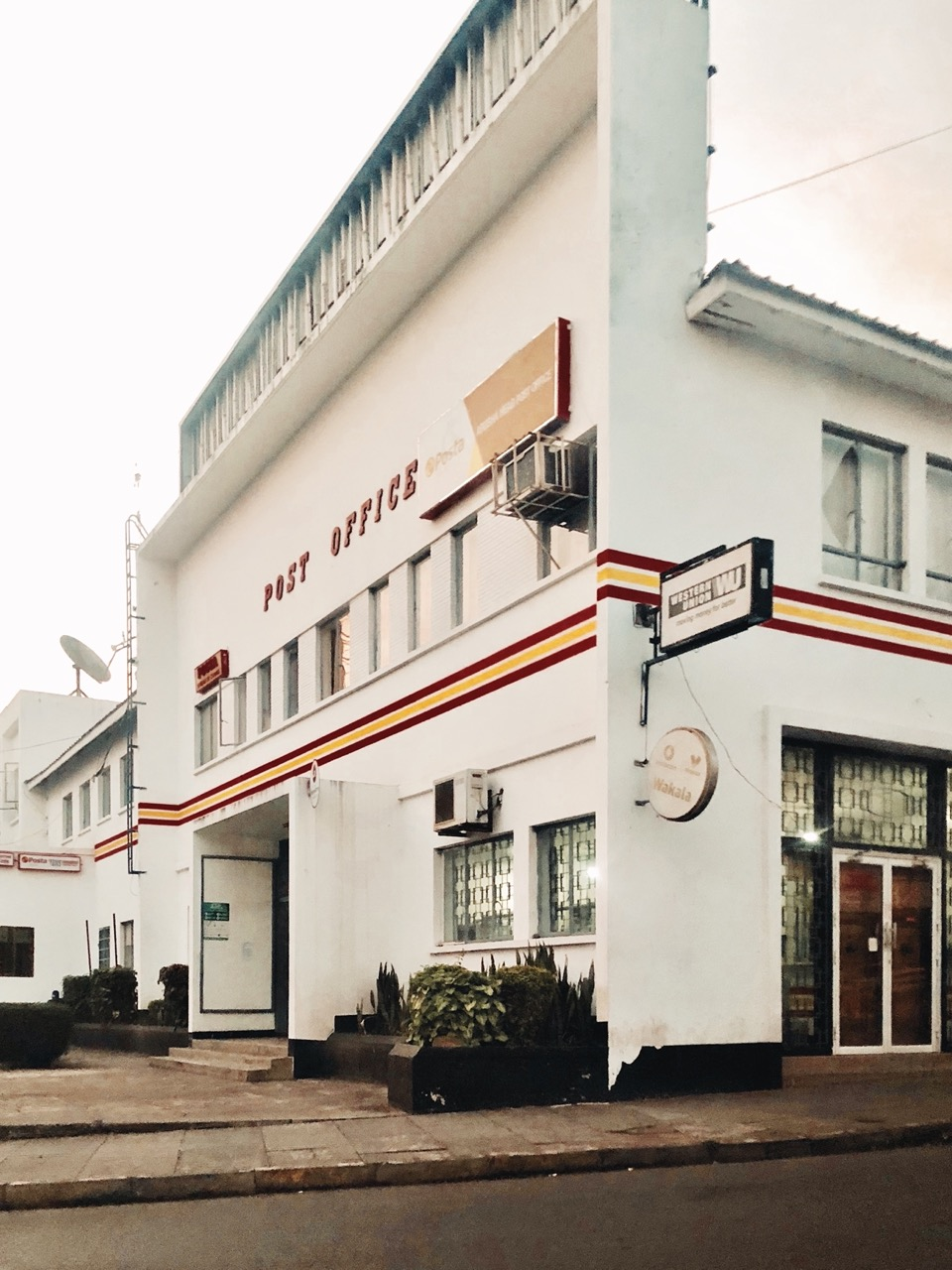
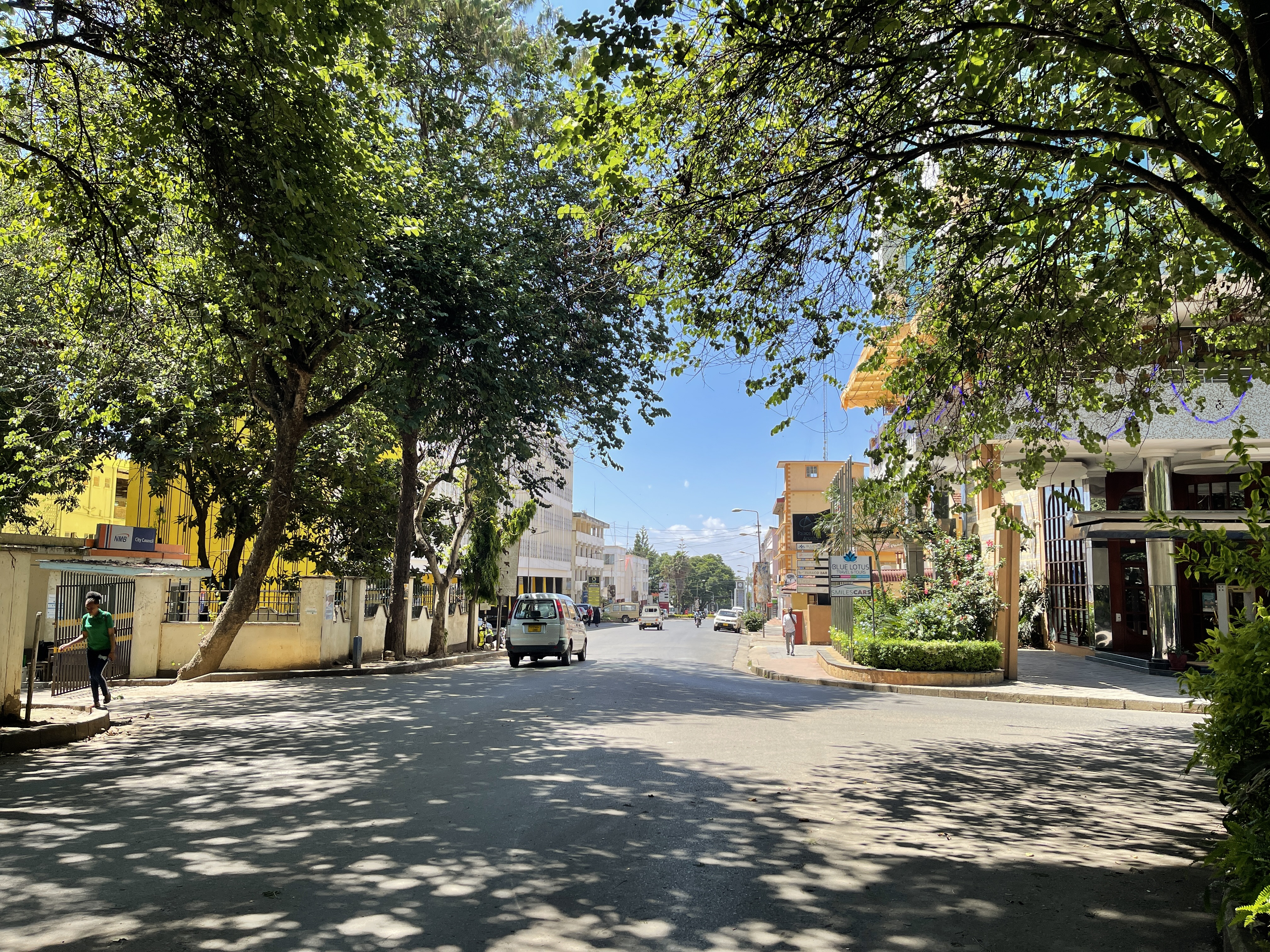
- From top to bottom: Streetscape in Sekei, The Arusha Post Office HQ & Boma Street in Sekei
- Nickname: Arusha's capital
- Location within Tanzania
- Coordinates: 3°22′11.28″S 36°41′39.48″E
- Country: Tanzania
- Region: Arusha Region
- District: Arusha District
- Ward: 1969
- Headquarters: Goliondoi

Area
  - Total: 2.643 km^{2} (1.020 sq mi)
- Elevation: 1,420 m (4,660 ft)

Population (2012)
  - Total: 9,213
  - Density: 3,485/km^{2} (9,030/sq mi)
- Demonym: Sekeian

Ethnic groups
  - Settler: Swahili, Chaga, Indians, & Europeans
  - Ancestral: Kinongo
- Tanzanian Postal Code: 23101

Sekei (Kata ya Sekei, in Swahili) is an administrative ward and district capital located in the Arusha City Council of Arusha Region in Tanzania. The ward is bordered by Kaloleni ward to the west, Sokon II ward to the north, Kimandolu ward to the east, Themi to the south and, a tiny portion of Kati ward to the southeast. The name sekei comes from the Masai word seki which is a type of tree that grew there before settlement. Sekei ward was officially established in 1969 and is the location of the headquarters of Arusha City Council.

The ward is home to the East African Legislative Assembly (EALA), the Arusha International Conference Centre (AICC), and the Arusha National Museum of Natural History. Sekei is the richest ward in the city because of the large international organizations, national, and regional headquarters of various government institutions that are located there. According to the 2012 census, the ward had a total population of 9,213.

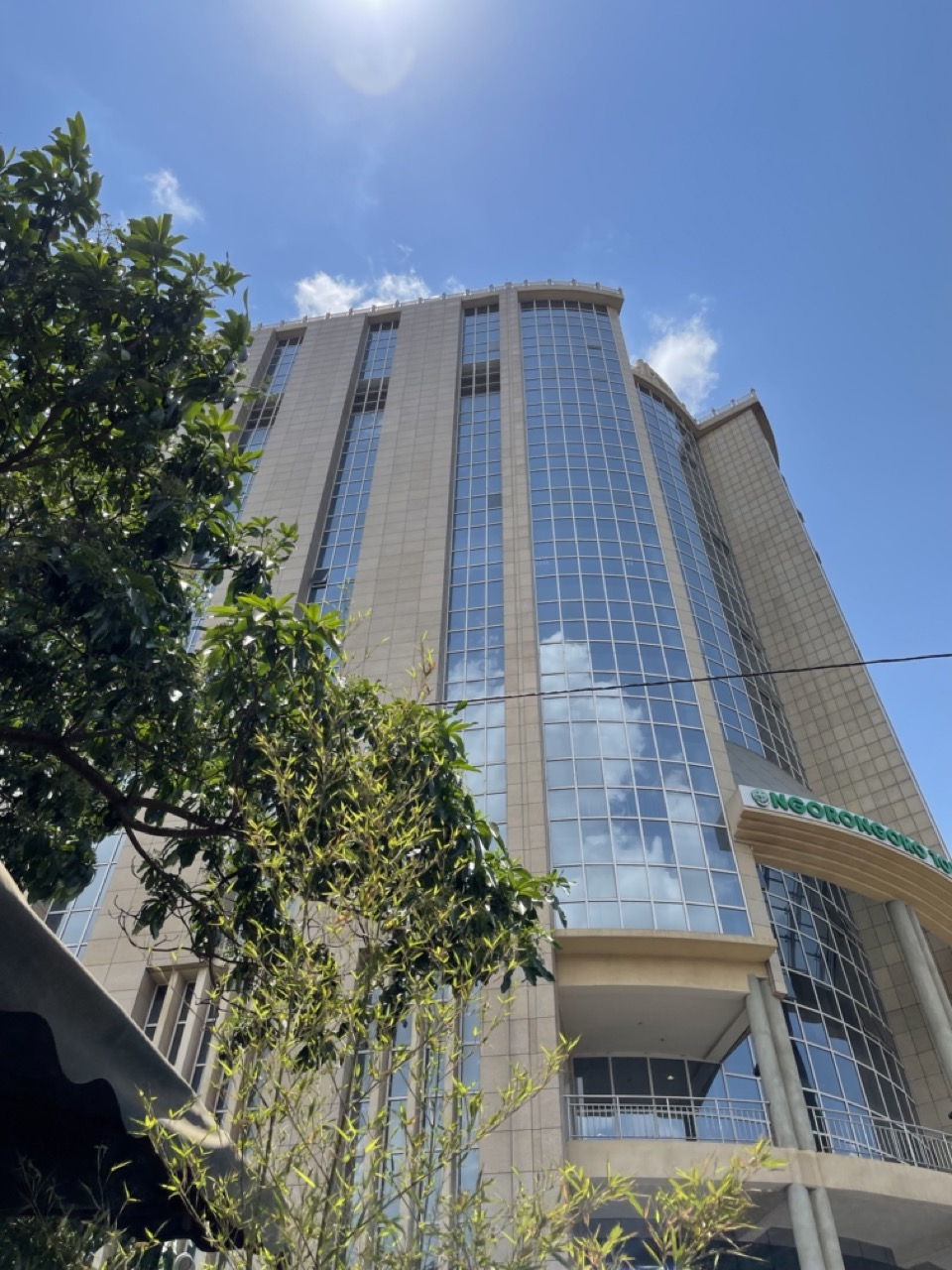
The Ngorongoro Tourism Center Building, Goliondoi Neighborhood, Sekei Ward, Arusha City.

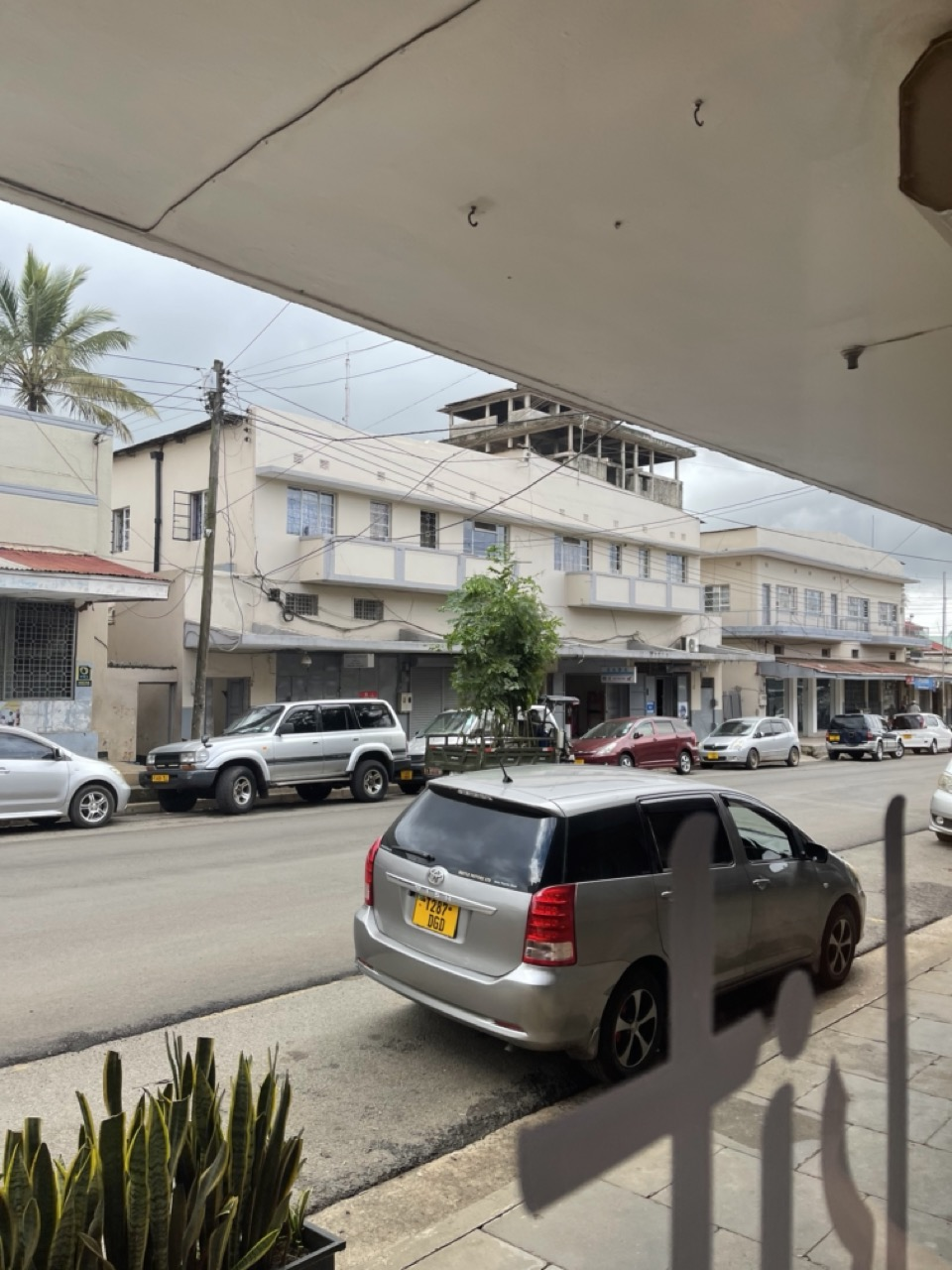
Goliondoi Street, Goliondoi Neighborhood, Sekei Ward, Arusha City.

== Geography ==
The ward is on the slopes of Mount Meru, It is bordered to the west by Naura River and to the east by Kijenge River. The ward covers an area of 2.643 km2 (1.446 sq mi) and ranks number thirteen in the area in Arusha city.

== Economy ==
The ward is also home to the Arushs Gran Melia Hotel, owned by Melia Hotels International. Sekei is also home to the East African Community's Legislative Assembly and also AICC. These institutions are the biggest contributors to the Sekei ward economy, supporting the surrounding businesses. The ward is also home to the Mount Meru Regional Referral Hospital which is the largest in the entire Arusha region. The ward also a major tourist attraction as it is home to two City monuments, The Arusha Clock Tower and the Arusha Old Boma.

The ward is also home to the Bank of Tanzania Arusha Regional Headquarters, additionally, also home to the Arusha regions Tanzania Revenue Authority (TRA) headquarters. Also the central police station for the city and the Arusha Regional Police headquarters is located in the ward. The city's only golf course is located entirely with the ward. The Arusha Regional Court is in Sekei ward. Moreover, The Arusha Regional Capital building is located in Sekei and Arusha City Hall is also located in Sekei ward. The city's tallest building the Ngorongoro Tourist Center Building is located in Sekei Ward.

== Administration ==
The postal code for Sekei Ward is 23101. The ward is divided into the following neighborhoods:

- AICC
- Mahakama
- Naurei
- Goliondoi
- Nuara
- Sanawari

=== Government ===
The ward, like every other ward in the country, has local government offices based on the population served. Sekei Ward administration building houses a court as per the Ward Tribunal Act of 1988, including other vital departments for the administration the ward. The ward has the following administration offices:

- Sekei Ward Police Station located in Sanawari neighborhood
- Sekei Ward Government Office (Afisa Mtendaji, Kata ya Karatu) in Karatu Mjini Neighborhood
- Sekei Ward Tribunal (Baraza La Kata) is a Department inside Ward Government Office

In the local government system of Tanzania, the ward is the smallest democratic unit. Each ward is composed of a committee of eight elected council members which include a chairperson, one salaried officer (with no voting rights), and an executive officer. One-third of seats are reserved for women councillors.

== Education and health ==
=== Education ===
Sekei ward is home to these educational institutions:

- Capricorn Institute of Information technology (private)
- Tropical Center College of Tourism
- Sanawari Primary School
- Naura Primary School
- Kijenge Primary School

There is no secondary school in Sekei.

=== Healthcare ===
Sekei ward is home to the following health institutions:

- AICC Hospital (private)
- Mount Meru Regional Referral Hospital
- Gemsa Specialist Polyclinic (private)
- Avintacare Medical Center (private)
- Orbit Polytechnic and Diagnostic Center
- Upendo Dispensary
- BOT dispensary
- St. Raphael Dispensary
- Gloria Dispensary
