= Elerai =

Ward of Arusha City Council in Arusha Region of Tanzania

Elerai Ward Kata ya Elerai (Swahili)
- Ward
- Kata ya Elerai
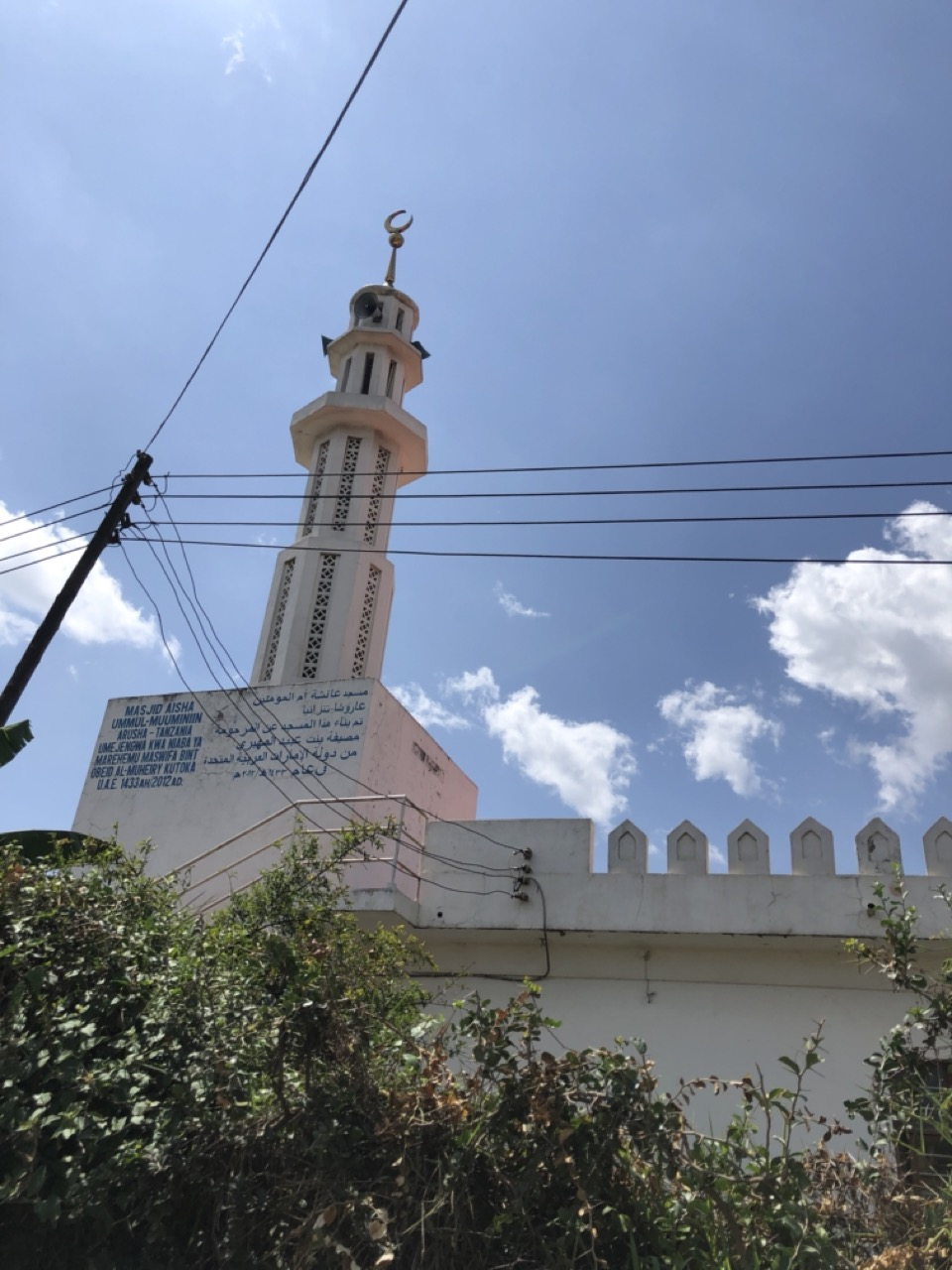
- Masjid Aisha in Majengo, Elerai ward

- Location within Tanzania
- Coordinates: 3°22′5.88″S 36°39′33.48″E
- Country: Tanzania
- Region: Arusha Region
- District: Arusha District

Area
  - Total: 3.746 km^{2} (1.446 sq mi)
- Elevation: 1,387 m (4,551 ft)

Population (2012)
  - Total: 40,749
  - Density: 10,887/km^{2} (28,200/sq mi)
- Demonym: Eleraian

Ethnic groups
  - Settler: Waarusha, Iraqw & Meru
  - Ancestral: Kinongo

Elerai is an administrative ward in Arusha District, Arusha Region of Tanzania. It is one of 19 urban administrative wards in the municipality. The ward is bordered by Olasiti ward to the west, Kiranyi ward to the north, Ngarenaro ward to the east, Sombetini to the south and, a tiny portion of Unga L.T.D ward to the southeast. The ward covers an area of 3.746 km^{2} (1.446 sq mi) and ranks number eleven in the area in Arusha city. The ward is home to the national National College of Tourism, the African Court and Tanzania National Parks Authority (TANAPA)'s national headquarters, also the Arusha Modern school. The school's famous alumna is Tanzanian recording artist, Vanessa Mdee, who received secondary education there. According to the 2012 census, the ward had a total population of 40,749.

== Economy ==
The ward is also home to TANAPA national headquarters and the famous African Court. Other industries are the Arusha Meat company and the JR Institute of Information Technology. These institutions are the biggest contributors to the Elerai ward economy, supporting the surrounding businesses. The ward is also home to the Elerai Maize Depot which is one of the largest in the city bringing maize from surrounding regions to be sold and distributed. The ward also has some light industries and manufacturing that also support the ward's economy.

== Administration and neighborhoods ==
The postal code for Elerai Ward is 23106. Elerai ward is divided into fourteen neighborhoods:

- Azimio, Elerai
- Majengo A, Elerai
- Majengo B, Elerai
- Mama Musa, Elerai
- Olmatejoo A, Elerai
- Olmatejoo B, Elerai
- Remtula, Elerai
- Sakon, Elerai
- Shuma, Elerai
- Kware, Elerai
- Ngurumo, Elerai
- Sakina, Elerai
- Samanga, Elerai
- Urundini, Elerai

== Education ==
Elerai ward is home to these educational institutions:

- Burka Primary School
- Elerai Secondary School
- Elerai Primary School
- Azimio Primary School
- Arusha Modern School (private)
- National College of Tourism
- JR Institute of Information technology (private)
- St. Michael Primary School (private)
- Majengo Primary School (private)

== Healthcare ==
Elerai ward is home to the following health institutions:

- Sakina Medical Center (private)
- Elerai Health Center
- Elerai Dispensary (private)

== Note ==
Not to be confused with a village in Kilindi District in Tanga Region of Tanzania also named Elerai. That village is bordered by Kibirashi village to the north-east.
