= Ngarenaro =

Ward of Arusha City council in Arusha Region

Ngarenaro Kata ya Ngarenaro (Swahili)
- Ward of Arusha City Council
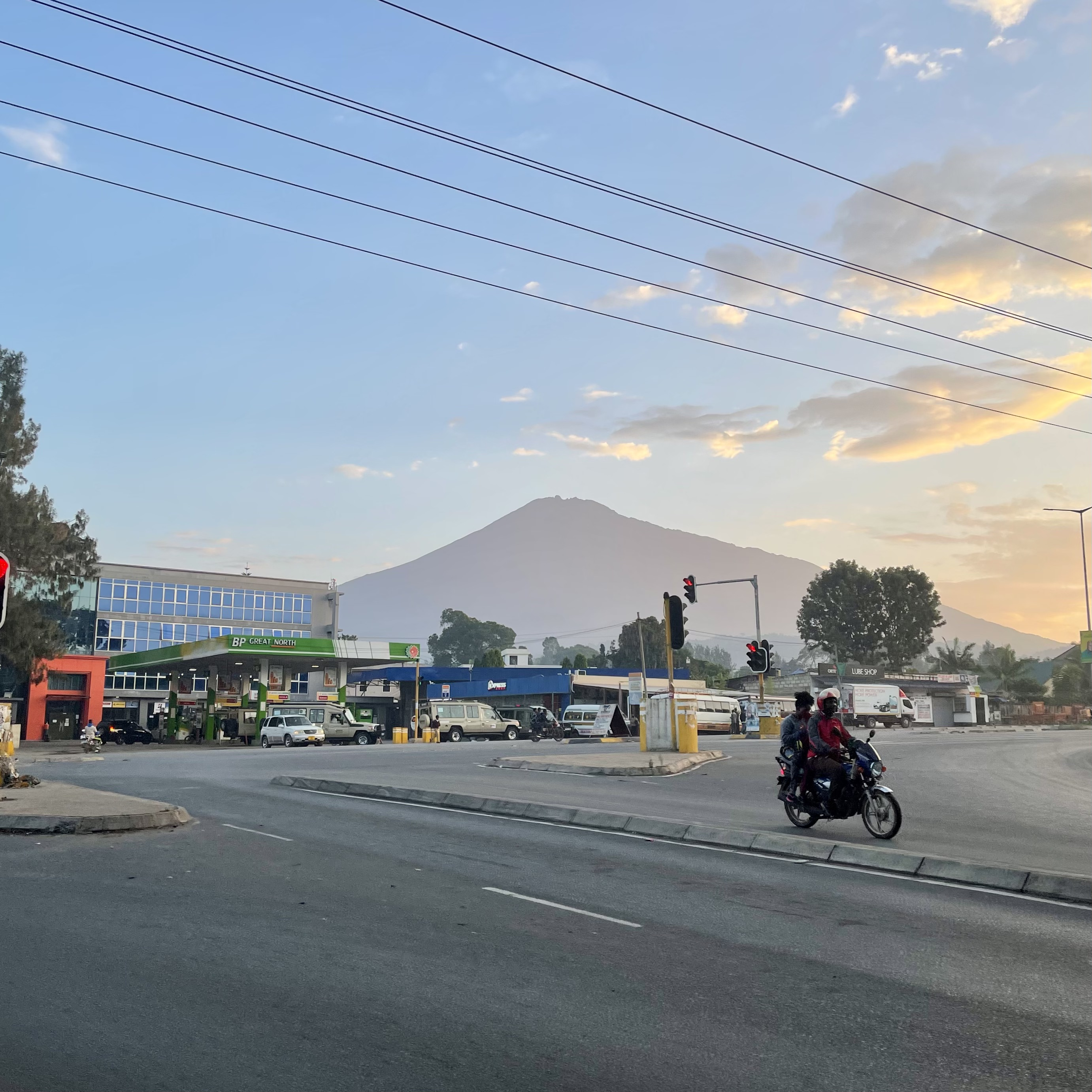
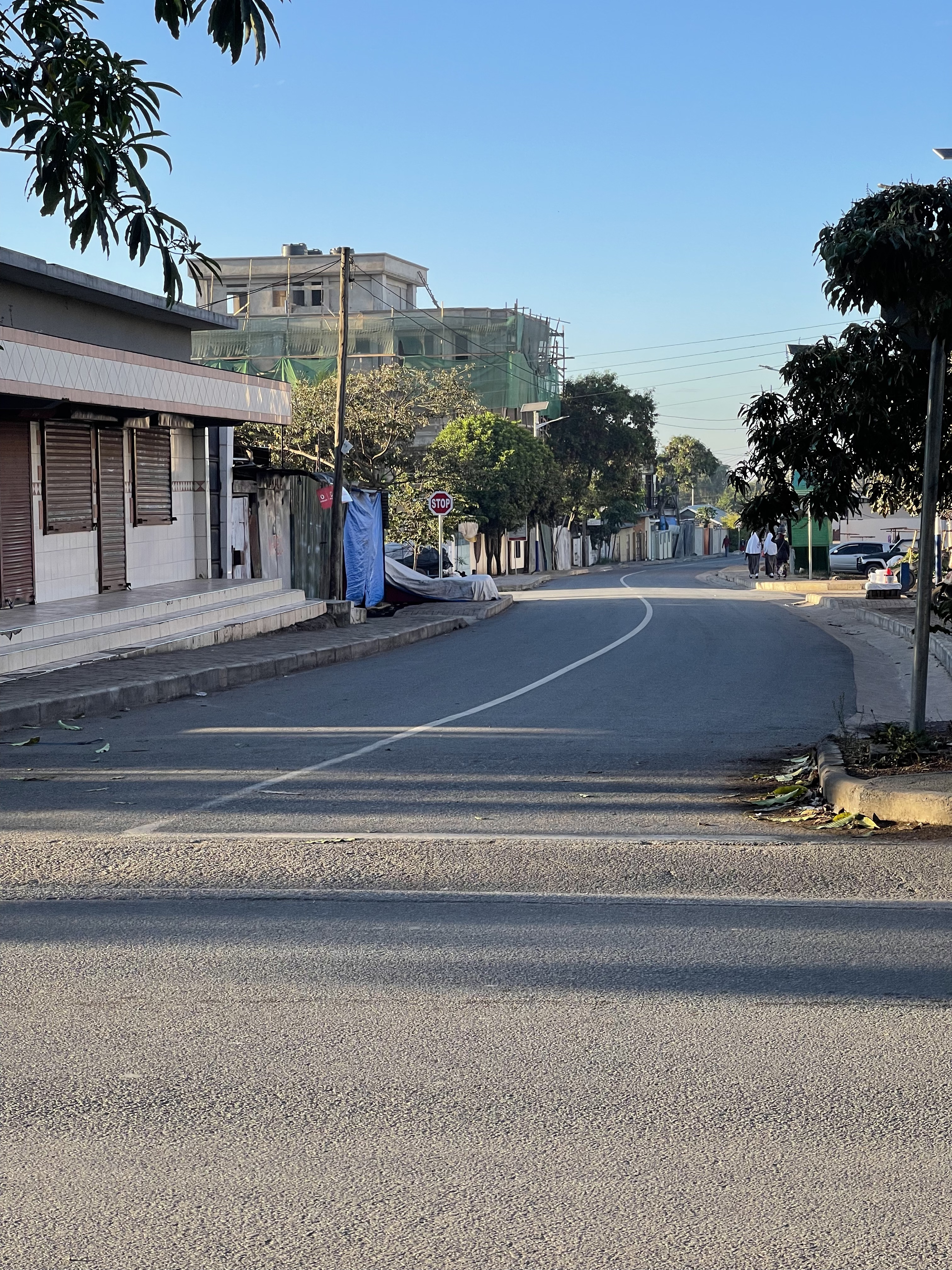
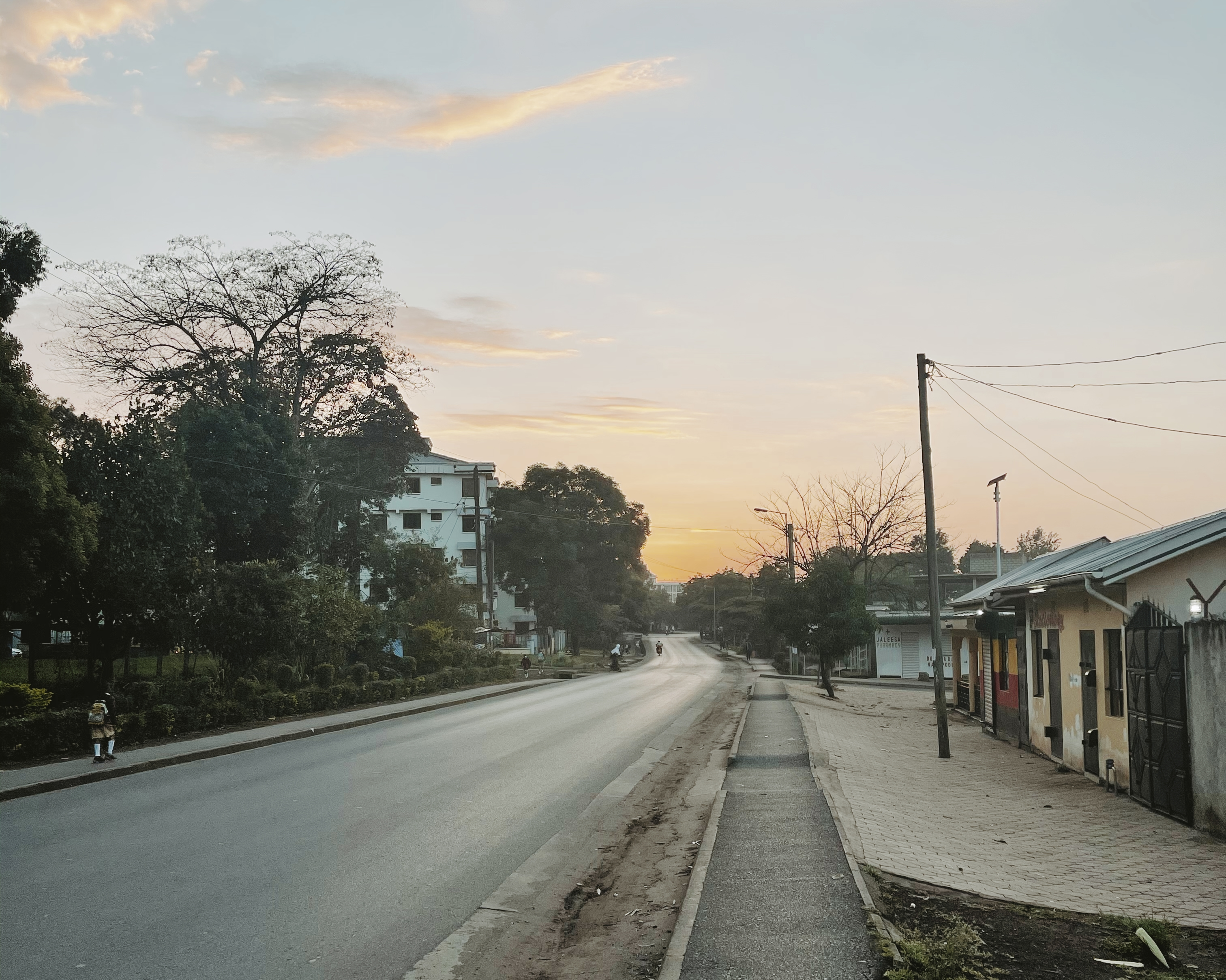
- From top to bottom: Mount Meru view from Technical neighborhood, Street in Ngarenaro & One of the streets in Ngarenaro
- Nickname: "Black river"
- Location within Tanzania
- Coordinates: 3°22′9.48″S 36°40′32.16″E
- Country: Tanzania
- Region: Arusha Region
- District: Arusha City Council
- Seat: Kambi ya Fisi

Area
  - Total: 0.9928 km^{2} (0.3833 sq mi)
- Elevation: 1,387 m (4,551 ft)
- Highest elevation: 1,400 m (4,600 ft)

Population (2012)
  - Total: 12,382
  - Density: 12,472/km^{2} (32,300/sq mi)
- Demonym: Ngarenaroan

Ethnic groups
  - Settler: Waarusha & Meru
  - Ancestral: Kinongo
- Tanzanian Postal Code: 23105

Ngarenaro (Kata ya Ngarenaro in Swahili) is an administrative ward located in the Arusha City Council of Arusha Region in Tanzania. The ward gets its name from the Ngarenaro River, which runs on the eastern border with Levolosi ward. the word Ngarenaro is a Swahilization of the Masai word Engarenarok, meaning "Black River".

Ngarenaro is one of 19 urban administrative wards in the municipality as of 2012. The ward is bordered by Elerai ward to the west, Levolosi ward to the east and, Unga Limited ward to the south. The ward covers an area of 0.9928 km^{2} (0.3833 sq mi). According to the 2012 census, the ward has a total population of 12,382.

== Economy ==
The ward is home to the Arusha Technical College, which is the biggest employer in the ward, as many businesses services inside the ward cater to the staff and students that live in the campus and the ward. There is a four lane T5 National Highway that runs north south direction in the middle of Ngarenaro ward. The road divides the ward into east and west Ngarenaro. Southwest Ngarenaro neighborhood like Darajani and Olmatejoo are low income and densely populated with few basic amenities and services. Southeast Ngarenaro neighborhood of NHC is upper middle class with organized paved streets with street light and amenities. All the schools in the ward are located in Southeast Ngarenaro. Another economic influence in the ward lies across the Ngarenaro River is Kilombero Market, which is the second largest produce market in the city after Soko Kuu in downtown. The market is located on the Levolosi side of the border.

== Administration and neighborhoods ==
The postal code for Ngarenaro is 23105. Ngarenaro is divided two zones and further divided into six neighborhoods:

=== North Ngarenaro ===
- Technical
- Kambi ya Fisi
- Mita Mia Mbili

=== South Ngarenaro ===
- NHC (National Housing Corporation)
- Darajani
- Olmatejoo

=== Government ===
The ward, like every other ward in the country, has local government offices based on the population served. The Ngarenaro Ward Office building houses a court as per the Ward Tribunal Act of 1988, including other vital departments for the administration the ward. The ward has the following administration offices:

- Ngarenaro Police Station in Kambi ya Fisi neighborhood
- Ngarenaro Government Office (Afisa Mtendaji) in Kambi ya Fisi neighborhood
- Ngarenaro Ward Tribunal (Baraza La Kata) is a Department inside Ward Government Office

In the local government system of Tanzania, the ward is the smallest democratic unit. Each ward is composed of a committee of eight elected council members which include a chairperson, one salaried officer (with no voting rights), and an executive officer. One-third of seats are reserved for women councillors.

== Education ==
Ngarenaro ward is home to a number of schools:

- Ngarenaro Primary School
- Ngarenaro Secondary School
- Mwangaza Primary School
- Maromboso Baptist Primary School
- Unity Primary School

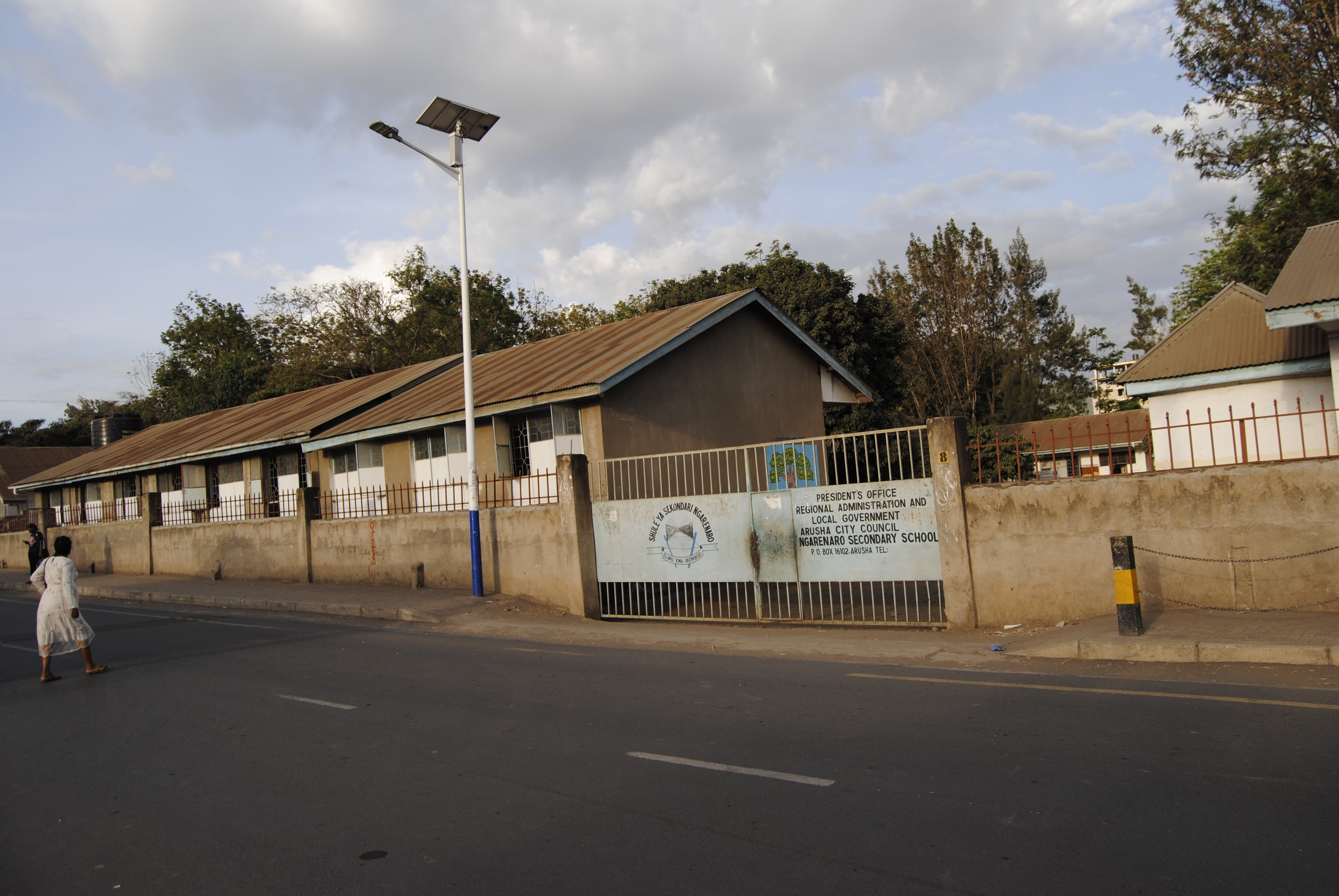
Ngarenaro Secondary School

== Healthcare ==
Ngarenaro is home to the following health centers:

- Afyamax Clinic
- Tashriff Health Clinic
- Ngarenaro Health Center (in Levolosi Ward)

== Popular culture ==
Ngarenaro has been referenced in mainstream Tanzanian pop culture by musician and rapper Dogo Janja, who was born and raised in Ngarenaro. He has often mentioned the ward in his music including his 2017 single titled "Ngarenaro".

== Notable people ==
- Dogo Janja, Tanzanian recording artist
- Millard Ayo, Tanzanian media producer and presenter
