= Mount Kilimanjaro International Convention Centre =

Mount Kilimanjaro International Convention Centre – Under Planning –
- Interactive map of Mount Kilimanjaro International Convention Centre – Under Planning –
- Address: Njiro Road, Themi Hills
- Location: Arusha, Tanzania
- Coordinates: 3°23′17″S 36°42′17″E
- Owner: AICC

Construction
- Construction cost: US$ 248 million

The Mount Kilimanjaro International Convention Centre (MKICC) is a proposed convention centre in the northern Tanzanian city of Arusha.
