= Terrat, Arusha District =

Terrat
- Ward
- Location within Tanzania Location within Africa
- Coordinates: 3.866667°S 36.6°E
- Country: Tanzania
- Region: Arusha
- District: Arusha

Population
  - Total: 8,044

Terrat is an administrative ward in the Arusha District of the Arusha Region of Tanzania. According to the 2002 census, the ward has a total population of 8,044.
