= Babu Tale =

Tanzania talent manager and politician

Honorable Babu Tale MP

Member of Parliament
- Incumbent
- Assumed office 2020
- Preceded by: Omary Tebweta Mgumba
- Constituency: Morogoro South

Personal details
- Born: Hamisi Shaban Taletale; 31 December 1982 (age 43) Dar Es Salaam
- Party: Chama Cha Mapinduzi
- Occupation: Talent manager, politician

Hamisi Shaban Taletale, also known as Babu Tale (born 31 December 1982), is a Tanzanian talent manager and politician presently serving as the Chama Cha Mapinduzi's Member of Parliament for Morogoro South constituency since November 2020. He is the co-founder of the WCB Wasafi music label.

== Career ==
Tale represents artists including Diamond Platnumz, Madee, Rayvanny, Mbosso, Rich Mavoko, and Dogo Janja. Through Rayvanny, Tale was the first manager to bring BET Award wins to Tanzania and the first in Africa to win MTV Europe Music Awards for both "Best African Act" and "Worldwide Act" through Diamond Platnumz's win in 2015.

In 2017 he controversially endorsed an independent candidate for Embakasi seat.

In 2018 he was arrested and taken to Tanzania court of law for debts.
