= Sheikh Amri Abeid Memorial Stadium =

Stadium in Arusha City, Arusha Region, Tanzania

- Uwanja wa Kumbukumbu wa Sheikh Amri Abeid
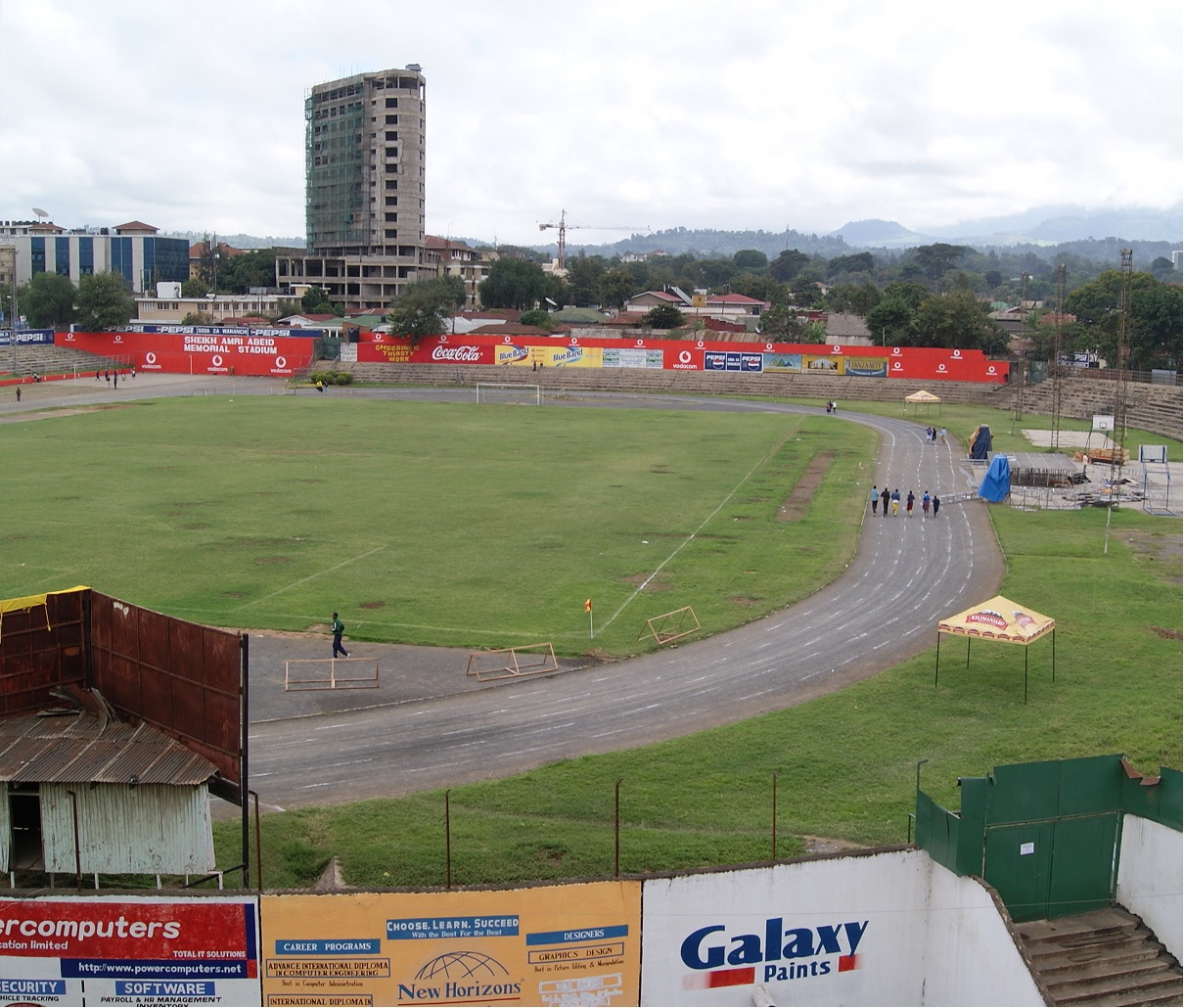

- Location in Tanzania
- Address: Stadium Road
- Location: Kaloleni, Arusha, Tanzania
- Coordinates: 3.369119°S 36.686004°E
- Owner: Chama Cha Mapinduzi
- Capacity: 20,000
- Type: Multi-purpose stadium

Tenants
- Arusha F.C., JKT Oljoro FC

Sheikh Amri Abeid Memorial Stadium is a multi-purpose stadium in Kaloleni ward of Arusha in Arusha Region of Tanzania. It is named after the Tanzanian cleric, politician and poet Kaluta Amri Abeid and is currently used mostly for football matches and serves as the home venue for Arusha FC. The stadium was the host of the 2011 Kilimanjaro Bowl, the first American football game played on the continent of Africa. It holds 20,000 people.
