= Terrat, Arusha =

Ward of Arusha City Council in Arusha Region of Tanzania

Terrat
- Ward
- Kata ya Terrat
- Location within Tanzania
- Coordinates: 03°29′22″S 36°40′49″E
- Country: Tanzania
- Region: Arusha Region
- District: Arusha

Population (2012)
  - Total: 21,790

Terrat is an administrative ward in the Arusha Urban District located in the Arusha Region of Tanzania. Not to be confused with Terrat ward in Simanjiro, Manyara region. According to the 2012 census, the ward has a total population of 21,790.
