= Arusha City Council =

District of Arusha Region, Tanzania

Arusha City Council Halimashauri ya Jiji la Arusha (Swahili)
- District of Arusha
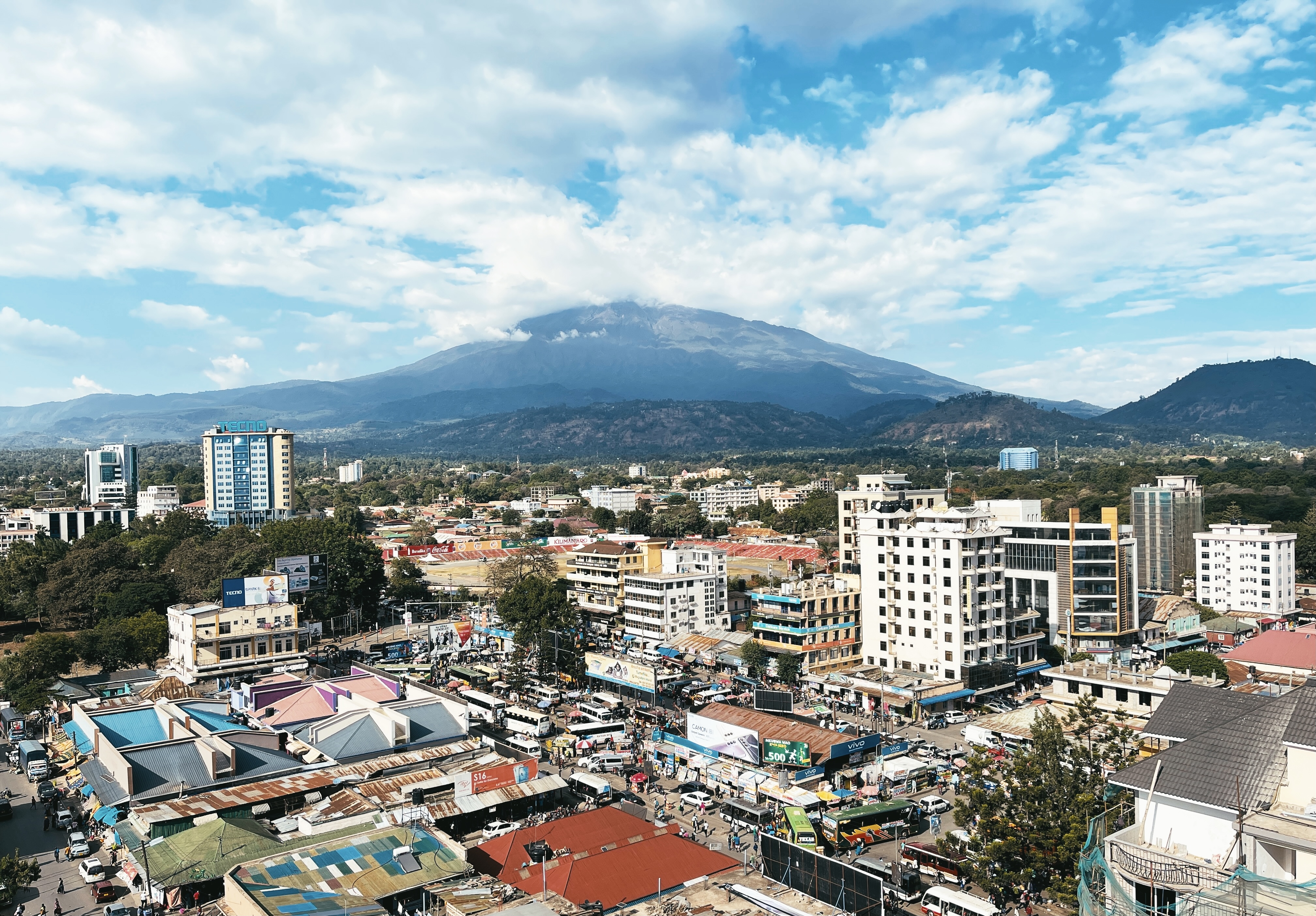
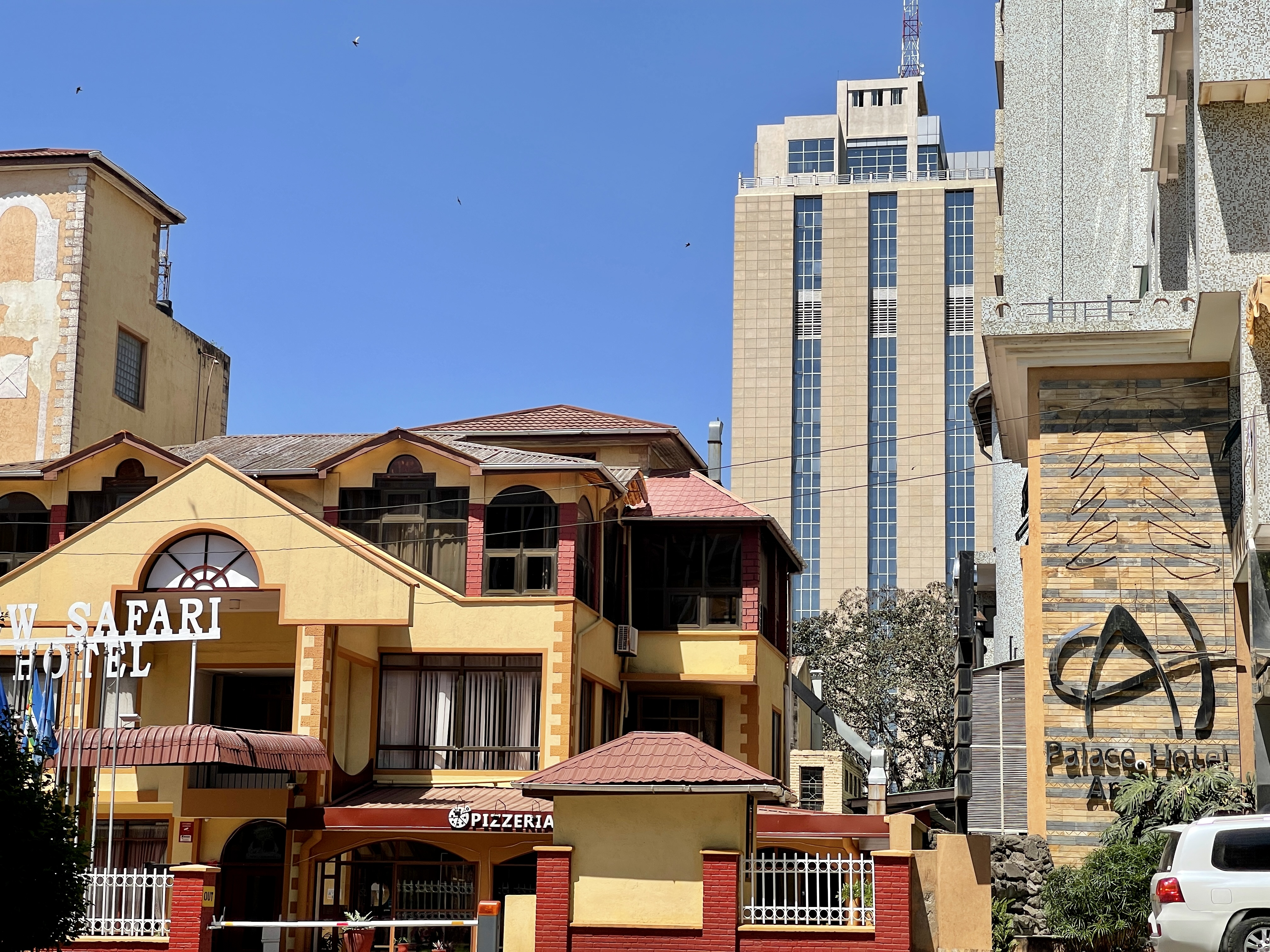
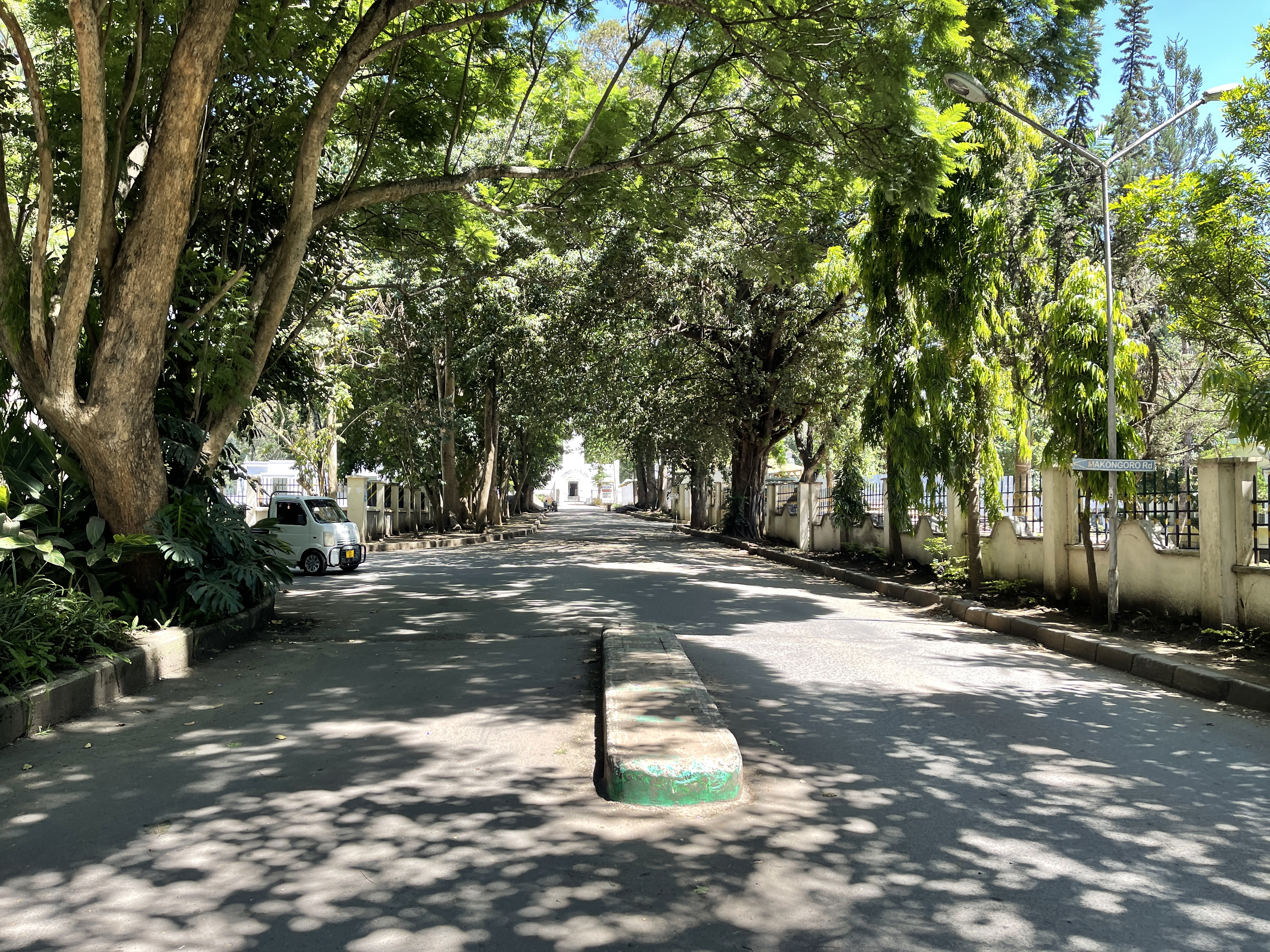
- From top to bottom: Arusha cityscape with Meru in the background, Sekei ward in Arusha City, and Boma road
- Nickname: Tanzania's wealthiest district
- Arusha City in Arusha Region
- Coordinates: 03°22′21″S 36°41′40″E
- Country: Tanzania
- Region: Arusha Region
- Named for: Arusha people
- Capital: Sekei

Area
  - Total: 267 km^{2} (103 sq mi)
  - Rank: 7th in Arusha
- Highest elevation (Themi Hill): 1,457 m (4,780 ft)

Population (2022)
  - Total: 617,631
  - Rank: 1st in Arusha
  - Density: 2,310/km^{2} (5,990/sq mi)
- Demonym(s): City Arushan; Archugan

Ethnic groups
  - Settler: Swahili, Chaga, Pare, Maasai, Arab & Indian
  - Native: Rwa & Arusha people
- Time zone: UTC+3 (EAT)
- Tanzanian Postcode: 231xx
- Website: Official website
- Symbols of Tanzania
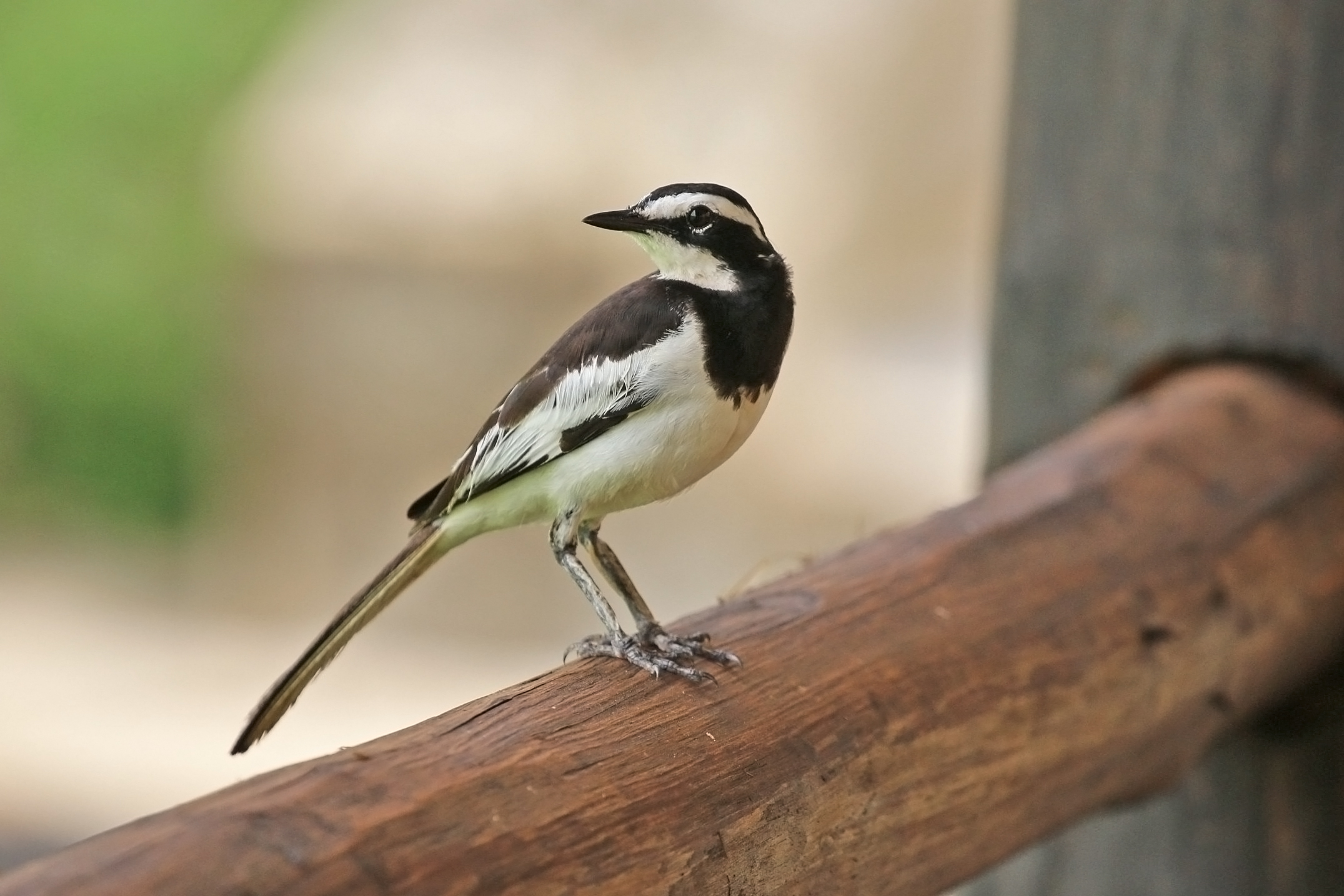
- Bird: African pied wagtail

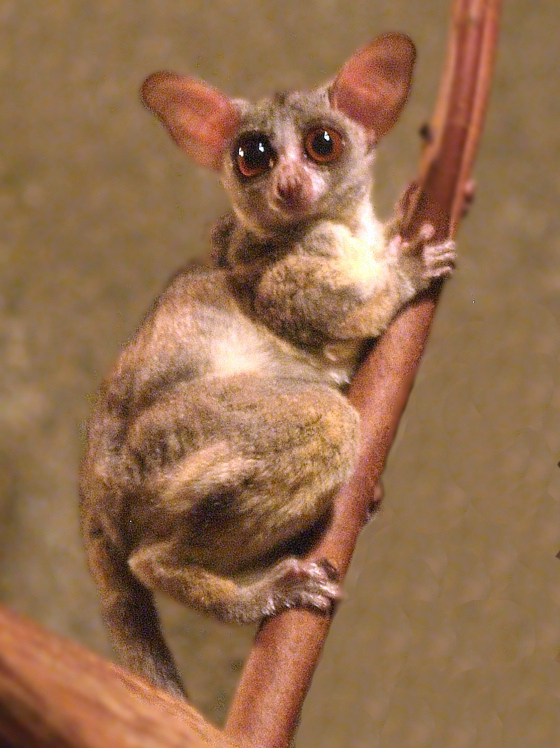
- Mammal: Senegal bushbaby

Arusha City Council (Halmashauri ya Jiji la Arusha, in Swahili) is one of seven administrative districts of Arusha Region in Tanzania. It is surrounded to the south, west and north by Arusha Rural District and to east by Meru District. The district covers an area of 267.0 km^{2} (103.1 sq mi). The district is comparable in size to the land area of Cayman Islands. The district capital is the city of Arusha. As of 1994, Arusha District was the wealthiest district in Tanzania. According to the 2022 Tanzania National Census, the population of Arusha Urban District was 617,631.

== Geography ==
The district covers an area of 267 km^{2} (103 sq mi), and has an average elevation of 1,331 m (4,367 ft). The district has no National park, however, there are a few protected areas such as Kijenge hill forest and Naura Park. The average temperature in the district is 20 °C (68 °F) and has an annual rainfall of 837 mm (33.0 in).

=== Climate ===
The city district has two rainy seasons, with brief rains from October through January and extensive rains from March through May. The annual rainfall varies from 500 millimeters to 1200 millimeters, with an average of 844 millimeters. The temperature ranges from 17 C to 34 C, with mild and cold temperatures being predominant. The cold season lasts from mid-April to mid-August, with pleasant weather the rest of the year.

=== Topgraphy ===
On Mount Meru's Southern Slopes is where Arusha City is situated. Its elevation ranges from 1,450 to 1,160 meters above sea level. The gently sloping plains are divided by the volcanically altered slopes that are from isolated peaks. Themi, Suye, Nemas, and many other hills are part of this group. Rivers and countless tiny streams that originate on the slope of Mount Meru or on the slopes of the aforementioned hills make up the city. These rivers include the Burka, Engarenaro, Naura, Themi, and Kijenge, which all flow into the Themi River and connect to the southern portion of the city.

The soil in Arusha City is andosol in general classification and is volcanic in origin. The moderate and steep slopes of Mt. Meru and its surrounding hills have the most fertile land and receive the most rainfall. Sand and pyroclastic rocks have been incorporated into the soil on the steep slope of Mount Meru. Most of the land in these areas is farmed.

As you get closer to Simanjiro, a flat area of gneiss, granite, and schist rock allows for water penetration to a reasonable depth, but the majority of the area is covered with clay soil, which is unproductive (has no natural fertility), and the soil retains water for a significant amount of time. Since most soils are composed primarily of volcanic ash, erosion is a key concern.

== Economy ==
The commerce, industries, small-scale agricultural, and tourism sectors are significant to Arusha City's economy. According to the report, business operations account for 52% of employment, office work accounts for 14%, primary occupations account for 17%, agriculture accounts for 19%, and plant operation assembly provides for the remaining 6%. Arusha is the wealthiest district in the Arusha region, hosting the region's headquarters for regional administration and businesses. The district is home to many international organizations as well including the East African legislative Assembly and World Vision country headquarters.

=== Infrastructure ===
Residents of Arusha rely on 2 fresh water springs and 15 boreholes. Only two of the 15 boreholes are within the limits of the city, while 13 are in the districts of Arumeru. Olesha and Masama, located along the Themi River, as well as Engare-endolu in the Central Business District, are the water springs.

==== Waste management ====
Based on population and the rate of production per capital per day, the average daily amount of waste produced is 550 tons, but only 455 tons, or around 81% of that amount, is collected and disposed of. 2,475 tons (15%) are used as animal feed and garbage recycling and reuse. Due to insufficient funding for the purchase of sufficient trash collection vehicles and other equipment, the remaining 19% is not collected, which causes major environmental damage, particularly near rubbish collection facilities.

In planned settlements around the city, septic tanks are used by 78% of all households, latrines by 8%, and traditional central sewerage systems by 14%. 90% of homes in rural (unplanned) areas use pit latrines, 9% do not have suitable latrines, and only 1% link septic tanks to soak pits.

The city's road network is 334.7 km long overall, of which 196 km are earth roads, 54 km are mule trails, and 84.7 km are paved roads. The city has two major highway arteries, the trunk road T2 connecting to the Kenya border crossing at Namanga with the other side connecting to Moshi. Trunk road T5 from Babati ends in the district. The Usambara Railway from Tanga to Arusha ends in the district as well.Arusha Airport is located within the district's boundaries inside the district ward of Olasiti.

=== Agriculture ===
There are hills and lowlands among the two agro-ecological zones (lands) in Arusha City. The highlands, where flowers, vegetables, coffee, and bananas are grown, rely on irrigation. Rainfall is necessary for the lowlands (semiarid) to cultivate food crops like maize and beans and cash crops like chick peas and pigeon peas. The average rainfall for highland areas is 1200mm, compared to 844mm for lowland areas. Both of these agro-ecological zones are used for livestock production. There are 42071 cattle, 31378 goats, 15567 sheep, 4970 pigs, and 38 fish ponds in the city of Arusha. The majority of the wards in Baraa, Kimandolu, Sokon 1, and Olasiti are included in Highland. While Lemara, Terrat, and Sokon I wards are included in Lowlands (Murriet).

=== Industry ===
The biggest commercial hub in northern and eastern Tanzania is Arusha City. One of the main sources of income for the residents of Arusha City is trade and commerce. The city serves as the marketplace for both domestic and imported goods and services. In an economy with a free market where buyers and sellers can engage, consumers meet their requirements. Retail and wholesale businesses are primarily located in the Central Business District of the Sekei, Sombetini, Kati, Kaloleni, Levolosi, Unga Ltd., and Ngarenaro Wards.

There are over fifty large and medium-sized manufacturing industries in the city of Arusha. Tanzania Breweries Ltd, Tanzania Pharmaceutical Industries [TPI], A to Z, (Treated mosquito net National Milling Corporation [Mills & Silos], Arusha Meat Company, Sunflag, CARMATEC, and ABB Tanalec are the key employers in Arusha City. In addition to these, the town is home to 200 other small-scale businesses. A commercial district is Arusha City Council. There are reportedly more than 18,190 traders there. Entrepreneurial pursuits include everything from handicrafts to tourism-related businesses like tour operators and currency exchanges. Additionally, there are financial institutions, an international conference center, a modern bus station, and retail and wholesale stores.

About ten market areas can be found in the city, including the Central Market (Soko Kuu), Kilombero, Sanawari, Soko Mjinga, Soko Mbauda, Kwa Mrombo, Soko Mapunda, Sombetini, Kijenge, and Elerai Markets. The two largest markets listed above are Central and Kilombero.

=== Mass Communication ===
In Arusha city, there are three main post offices and 15, 2560 mailboxes altogether. The primary post office, which is also the regional post services headquarters, is situated in front of Arusha's clock tower. The other two, which serve as departmental offices, are situated along Sokoine Road.

Television services are offered by both privately and publicly held businesses, including TBC, ITV, STAR TV, Azam TV, EATV, and Star Times Network channels. Radio Free Africa, Radio ORS, Tripple "A", Safina, Radio Five, Sunrise, Arusha One, Radio One, Mambo Jambo, Clouds FM, Magic, Uhuru, TBC Taifa, TBC FM, Kili FM, Kiss FM, Radio Sauti ya Injili, Passion FM, Radio Imani, Capital Radio, Radio Maria, and EA Radio are some other mass media outlets. All of them offer Arusha's citizens access to contemporary communication.

=== Tourism ===
Tanzania's northern region is home to the major local and international tourist destination of Arusha. Additionally, it serves as a designated transit stop for travelers going to national parks and the Kilimanjaro, Africa's highest mountain. Through Kilimanjaro International Airport, it has connections to other countries. The bulk of visitors to the country travel through it because it is the northern tourism circuit. There are 84 registered tour operator businesses and more than eleven tourist hotels. The main pursuits include operations for photographic safaris, hunting safaris, lodging and catering, mountaineering, airline [scheduled and character services], travel agency, and other transport operations.

Some attractions in the city are the Old German Boma, Cultural Heritage Souvenior Store, Arusha Declaration Museum, Souvenir and Batik Shops are all popular tourist destinations. The Clock Tower and Goliondoi Street are home to Arusha's top craft stores. Meerschaum pipes, batiki, Maasai bead necklaces, and Makonde carvings can all be found there.

== Demographics ==
The Arusha district is the ancestral home of the Rwa and the Arusha people. Over the year since the German colonial occupation and British occupation, there has been a major migration of individuals from all over the country and world to Arusha City. Settle communities such as the Swahili in Kati Ward, Chaga, Pare being the major business owners, Maasai being the major suppliers of beef and goats, Arab community selling jewellery and textiles in Kati Ward and Indian working in factories in Themi ward, have all exablished their own thriving communities with the city. According to the 2012 census, the district has a total population of 416,442.

== Administrative subdivisions ==
As of 2012, Arusha Urban District was administratively divided into 19 wards, three divisions and one constituency.

As of 2016; Themi, Elerai, and Suye are the three divisions of Arusha City, which is further divided into twenty-five (25) wards. Additionally, there are 154 Streets in the city, which is 154 in total.

Under the direction of the Hon. Mayor, councilors manage the City Council's administrative operations. The day-to-day management of the city is carried out by the City Director, with assistance from the heads of the several departments and sections (management). Ward Executive Officers, who report to the City Director, are in charge at the ward level.

The city is divided into thirteen (13) departments, including Human Resources and Administration, Planning, Statistics and Monitoring, Health, Finance and Trade, Primary and Secondary Education, Water, Agriculture and Cooperative, Livestock and Fishery, Land and Urban Planning, Community Development and Social Welfare, Engineering, Sanitation, and Environment.

=== Wards as of 2012 ===
- Baraa
- Daraja Mbili
- Elerai
- Engutoto
- Kaloleni
- Kati
- Kimandolu
- Lemara
- Levolosi
- Moshono
- Ngarenaro
- Oloirien
- Sekei
- Sokon I
- Sombetini
- Themi
- Unga L.T.D.
- Olasiti
- Terrat, Arusha

elerai

== Education & Healthcare ==
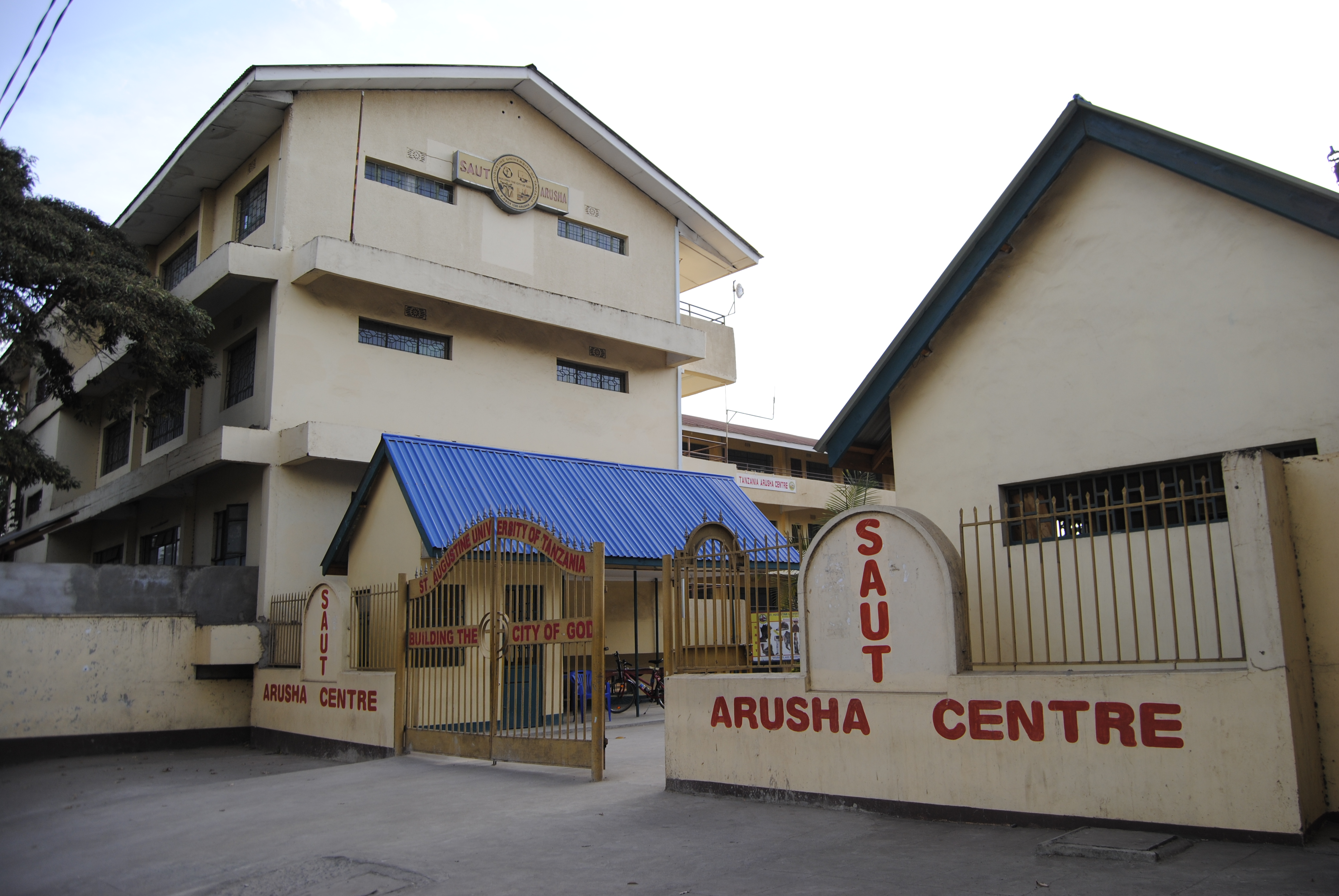
St.Augustine University of Tanzania, Arusha Campus in Levolosi Ward, Arusha City

=== Education ===
The Arusha City Council has 154 primary schools in total, 48 of which are owned by the government and 106 of which are privately held. Of the 103,288 students enrolled in these schools, 51,720 are males and 51,568 are girls. There are 52 secondary schools in total, 26 of which are owned by the government and 26 of which are privately operated, according to the Arusha City Council. Arusha Technical University (ATC), The Open University of Tanzania (OUT), The University of Dar es Salaam Computing Centre, Institute of Accountancy Arusha (AIA), East and Southern Africa Management Institute (ESAMI), University of Arusha, St. Augustine University of Tanzania (SAUT), and Baptist Mount Meru University are the higher education learning institutions that are active in Arusha City Council.

=== Healthcare ===
Every ward has at least one or more health facilities, either run by Arusha City or by the private sector. However, there is not an equal allocation of health services throughout the various wards. Compared to the outlying rural wards, the central business district (SBD) has a higher concentration of medical facilities. The City provides three various types of medical services, including hospitals, health centers, and dispensaries. Out of the five hospitals, one is owned by the government. 16 health centers, 60 dispensaries, 15 pharmacies, and 150 medical supply stores round out the city.

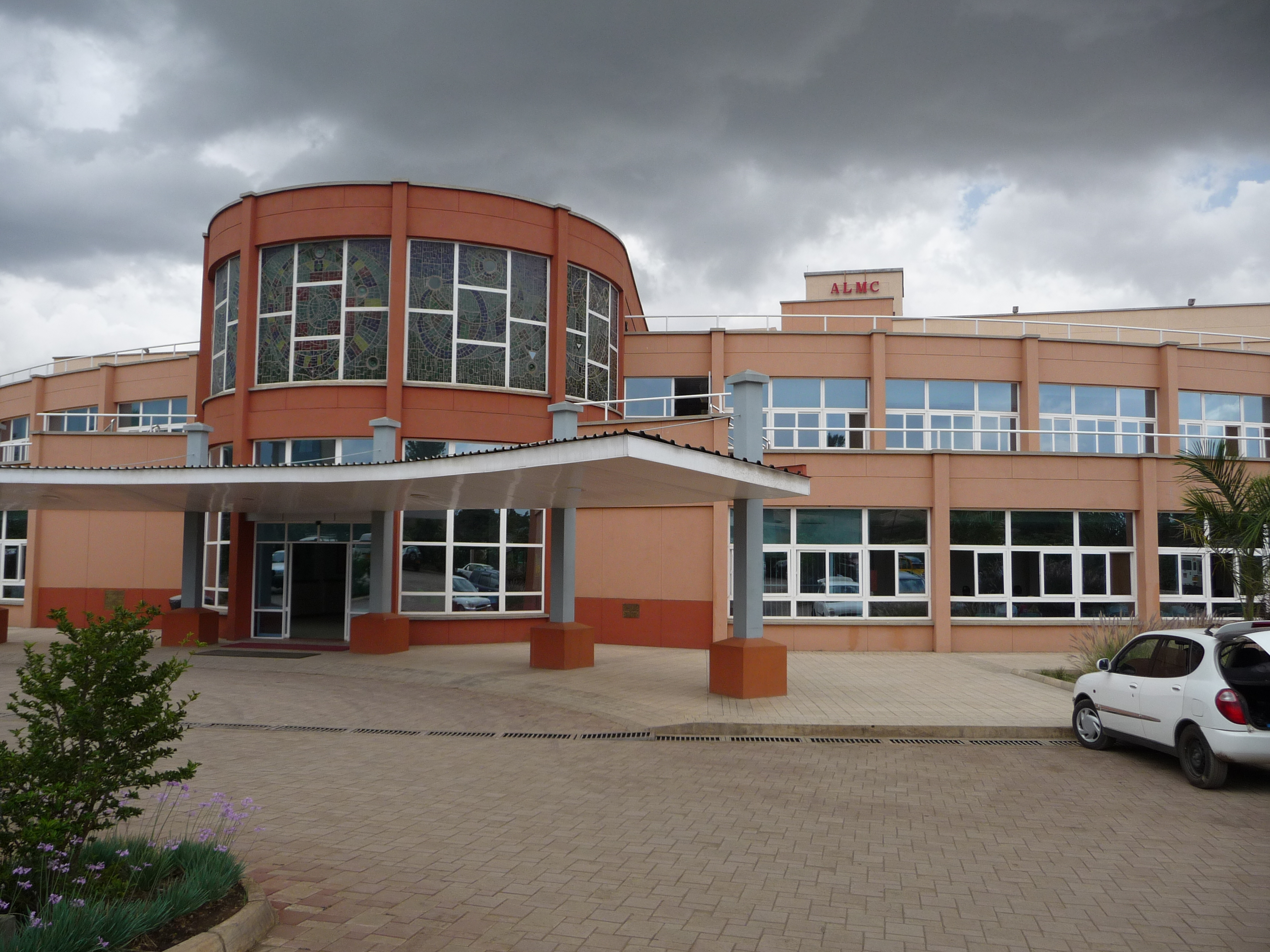
ALMC Hospital in Levolosi Ward, Arusha City

Arusha District is home to the largest medical centres/hospitals in the region;

- Mount Meru Regional Referral Hospital
- Arusha Lutheran Medical Center (ALMC)
- St. Elizabeth Hospital
- AICC hospital
- The Aga Khan University Hospital, Arusha
- NSK hospital
- Marie Stopes Clinic

=== Health cases ===
One of the top 10 illnesses for both adults and children is an upper respiratory tract condition at 26% of all cases. Followed by Urinary tract infections, surgeries, dermatological cases, hypertension, pneumonia, dysentery, gastrointestinal infections and denatal conditions. Arusah water has above WHO levels of fluoride leading to skeletal and dental fluorosis which turns the teeth brown. Arusha has low malaria cases due to its elevation. The most productive segment of the Arusha population is still under threat from HIV/AIDS. Since 1986, when the first instances were reported, the prevalence of HIV has continued to rise; by the end of 2016, it was 4.4% among VCT clients and blood donors, up from 4.1% in 2013, while it was 7% among pregnant women. Since the commencement of ARVs, where 315 persons have been enrolled, AIDS-related deaths have decreased. Eight VCT centers are now operated by the Arusha City Council, and three more facilities are planned for the 2016–2017 fiscal year. Every public health facility that offers prenatal care also offers PMTCT services.

== Notable people from Arusha City ==
- Dogo Janja, Tanzanian recording artist
- Vanessa Mdee, Tanzanian Singer-Songwriter
- Nahreel, recording artist and record producer from the Navy Kenzo music duo
- Millard Ayo, Tanzanian media producer and presenter
