= Daraja Mbili =

Ward of Arusha City Council in Arusha Region of Tanzania

- Ward
- Kata ya Daraja Mbili
- Location within Tanzania
- Coordinates: 03°22′59″S 36°41′24″E
- Country: Tanzania
- Region: Arusha Region
- District: Arusha District

Population (2012)
  - Total: 19,491

Daraja Mbili is an administrative ward of the Arusha District in the Arusha Region of Tanzania. Per the 2012 census, its population is 19,491.
