= Baraa =

Ward of Arusha City Council in Arusha Region of Tanzania

- Ward
- Kata ya Baraa
- Location within Tanzania
- Coordinates: 3°22′49.8″S 36°44′17.6″E
- Country: Tanzania
- Region: Arusha Region
- District: Arusha District

Area
  - Total: 4.504 km^{2} (1.739 sq mi)
- Elevation: 1,402 m (4,600 ft)

Population (2012)
  - Total: 12,498
  - Density: 2,775/km^{2} (7,190/sq mi)

Baraa, is an administrative ward in the Arusha District of the Arusha Region of Tanzania. The ward had a population of 12,498 as of 2012.
