= Arusha Technical College =

College based in Arusha City Council of Arusha Region in Tanzania

- Campus administration building
- Motto: Skills make the difference
- Type: Public Career College
- Established: 1978
- Rector: Musa N. Chacha
- Location: Arusha Region & Kilimanjaro Region, Tanzania; 03°21′52″S 36°40′43″E
- Language: Swahili & English
- Deputy Rector Academics: Yusuph B. Mhando
- Deputy Rector Admin: Florence A. Mamboya
- Colors: Dark blue & light green
- Website: www.atc.ac.tz
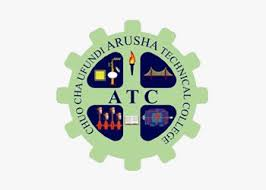

- Location in Tanzania

Arusha Technical College (ATC) is a Tanzanian college, with its main campus located inside Ngarenaro ward, in the city of Arusha, Arusha Region. ATC is one of the largest and well established public coeducational post-secondary tertiary education institutions in Arusha Region. The college has three campuses: Main Campus in Arusha City, the second campus in located in Oljoro ward in Arumeru District, Arusha Region. The third campus is located in the small town Kikuletwa in Hai District, Kilimanjaro.

== History ==
Student housing

ATC was established in 1978 by the Governments of the United Republic of Tanzania and Germany (then the Federal Republic of Germany), as the Technical College Arusha (TCA).

In March 2007, the name changed to the Arusha Technical College (ATC) through the Arusha Technical College Establishment Order No. 78 as enabled by the NACTE Act No. 9 of 1997.

== Accreditation ==
The National Council for Technical Education (NACTE) has granted ATC accreditation to teach technicians and engineers (NTAs 4-8). The Vocational Education Training Authority (VETA) has also approved the College to educate craftsmen (NVAs 1-3).

== Campuses ==
College medical building

=== ATC, Oljoro Campus ===
In 2011, ATC developed the Oljoro irrigation training farm in Oljoro ward in Arumeru District in south Arusha Region. The campus farm is designed to provide Civil and Irrigation Engineering students with practical skills. The campus is 150 acres (60 ha) and is mostly a demonstration irrigation farm. The Oljoro campus farm is roughly 15 kilometers south of Arusha city.

=== ATC, Kikuletwa Campus ===
Officially known as the Kikuletwa Renewable Energy Training and Research Center (KRETRC) was created in 2012 to train students on building and operating renewable energy projects. The campus has rehabilitated the Kikuletwa Hydro Power Plant and is the main feature on the campus. the campus is located in the town of Kikuletwa in Hai district Kilimanjaro region.
