= Lemara =

Ward of Arusha City Council in Arusha Region of Tanzania

- Ward
- Kata ya Lemara
- Location within Tanzania
- Coordinates: 03°24′55″S 36°41′53″E
- Country: Tanzania
- Region: Arusha Region
- District: Arusha District

Population (2012)
  - Total: 19,564

Lemara is an administrative ward in the Arusha District of the Arusha Region of Tanzania. According to the 2012 census, the ward has a total population of 19,564.
