= Dogo Janja =

Musical artist from Arusha Region, Tanzania

- Born: Abdulazizi Abubakari Chende; 15 September 1994 (age 31); Dar es Salaam, Tanzania
- Genres: Bongo flava and Afrobeat
- Occupation: Singer-songwriter
- Years active: 2009–present
- Label: Tip Top Connection
- Spouse: Queenlinah Totoo

Abdulazizi Abubakari Chende, also known as Dogo Janja (born 15 September 1994), is a Tanzanian singer-songwriter and rapper. He was born in Arusha and raised in Ngarenaro ward in the city of Arusha located in the Arusha Region. He is currently based in Dar es Salaam.

== Biography ==
His interest in music began early. His first official release came in 2009 whilst signed to Tip Top Connection Group, co-founded by Babu Tale, and previously home to other renowned Bongo Flava artists such as Rayvanny. His first release, My Life, in 2016, was well received, establishing his name as an artist.

== Discography ==
=== Albums ===
- Mtoto Wa Uswazi
- 2021: Asante Mama

=== Singles ===
- 2016: "My life"
- 2017: "Ngarenaro"
- 2017: "Ukivaaje Unapendeza"
- 2018: "Banana:
- 2018: "Mikogo Sio"
- 2018: "Wayu Wayu"
- 2018: "Since Day One"
- 2019: "Yente"
- 2020: "Asante" ft Lady Jaydee
