= Sokoni I =

Ward of Arusha City Council in Arusha Region of Tanzania

- Ward
- Kata ya Sokon I
- Location within Tanzania
- Coordinates: 03°24′24″S 36°40′42″E
- Country: Tanzania
- Region: Arusha Region
- District: Arusha District

Population (2012)
  - Total: 73,331

Sokoni I is an administrative ward in the Arusha District of the Arusha Region of Tanzania. According to the 2012 census, the ward has a total population of 73,331.
