= Oloirien =

Ward of Arusha City Council in Arusha Region of Tanzania

- Ward
- Kata ya Oloirien
- Location within Tanzania
- Coordinates: 03°23′20″S 36°42′53″E
- Country: Tanzania
- Region: Arusha Region
- District: Arusha District

Population (2012)
  - Total: 18,679

Oloirien is an administrative ward in the Arusha District of the Arusha Region of Tanzania. According to the 2012 census, the ward has a total population of 18,679. 47% of the population are males and 53% are female.
