= Engutoto =

Ward of Arusha City Council in Arusha Region of Tanzania

- Ward
- Kata ya Engutoto
- Location within Tanzania
- Coordinates: 03°26′37″S 36°42′35″E
- Country: Tanzania
- Region: Arusha Region
- District: Arusha District

Population (2016)
  - Total: 8,287
- Time zone: UTC+3 (EAT)

Engutoto is an administrative ward in the Arusha District of the Arusha Region of Tanzania. Meaning the hidden place in Maasai. In 2016 the Tanzania National Bureau of Statistics report there were 8,287 people in the ward, from 6,970 in 2012.
