= Kimandolu =

Ward of Arusha City Council in Arusha Region of Tanzania

- Ward
- Kata ya Kimandolu
- Location within Tanzania
- Coordinates: 03°22′04″S 36°42′58″E
- Country: Tanzania
- Region: Arusha Region
- District: Arusha District

Population (2012)
  - Total: 27,649

Kimandolu is an administrative ward in the Arusha District of the Arusha Region of Tanzania. It is roughly 6 km from the centre of Arusha town and lies between the Old Moshi Road and the Arusha-Himo highway, which leads directly to Moshi and Kilimanjaro International Airport (54 km away). There are various charitable NGOs currently working in the area with schools, healthcare and sports, such as Art In Tanzania. The local representative is Jackson Lemunga.

== Population ==
According to the 2012 census, the ward has a total population of 27,649.

== Climate and economy ==
The Arusha region is hottest from January to February, averaging at 29 °C, while the coolest month is July, where the temperature averages at 20 °C. Rainfall in the Arusha region is highest in April and lowest in July, ranging from 350mm to 10mm. Located very close to the foothills of Mount Meru, Kimandolu's rainfall provides luscious vegetation, and successful coffee and banana plantations.

Banana and coffee exportation, along with a number of hardware shops are key to the economy in Kimandolu.

== Transport to Arusha ==
The quickest way to get into town from Kimandolu is to catch a dala dala (the local transport system using old minibuses, usually heavily overloaded with people) which takes no more than ten minutes. The most direct routes are either the green line from Moshi highway, or the red line from the Suye road. It is also possible to walk into town, taking between half an hour to forty-five minutes.

== Nearby Wards ==
Other administrative wards located around Kimandolu include Baraa, Kijenge, Mnazareti, Ngulelo, and Suye.
