= Olasiti =

Ward of Arusha City Council in Arusha Region of Tanzania

- Ward
- Location within Tanzania
- Coordinates: 3°24′30.6″S 36°38′38.04″E
- Country: Tanzania
- Region: Arusha Region
- District: Arusha

Population (2012)
  - Total: 36,361

Olasiti is an administrative ward in the Arusha City Council located in the Arusha Region of Tanzania. According to the 2012 census, the ward has a total population of 36,361.
