= Kaloleni, Tanzania =

Ward of Arusha City Council in Arusha Region of Tanzania

Kaloleni
- Ward
- Kata ya Kaloleni
- Location within Tanzania
- Coordinates: 03°21′44″S 36°41′15″E
- Country: Tanzania
- Region: Arusha Region
- District: Arusha District

Population (2012)
  - Total: 9,591

Kaloleni is an administrative ward in the Arusha District of the Arusha Region of Tanzania. According to the 2012 census, the ward has a total population of 9,591.
