= Unga Limited =

Ward of Arusha City Council in Arusha Region of Tanzania

- Ward
- Location within Tanzania
- Coordinates: 3°22′43.22″S 36°40′39.72″E
- Country: Tanzania
- Region: Arusha Region
- District: Arusha District

Population (2012)
  - Total: 17,342

Unga Limited is an administrative ward in the Arusha District of the Arusha Region of Tanzania. According to the 2012 census, the ward has a total population of 17,342.
