= Koningo =

Kinongo
Regions with significant populations
- Tanzania: extinct

Related ethnic groups
- Pare, Chaga, other Bantu peoples

The Koningo (Swahili: Wakinongo) are an extinct Tanzanian ethnic and linguistic group that lived on the slopes of Mount Meru in present day Arusha City District, Meru District and Arusha District of Arusha Region. They were described as a hunter-gatherer society that preexisted the Wameru people in the 17th century.
