= All Africa Music Awards 2022 =

2022 edition of the All Africa Music Awards

2022 All Africa Music Awards
- Date: January 12, 2023–January 15, 2023
- Country: Senegal

Highlights
- Most nominations: (South Africa) Costa Titch & (Democratic Republic of the Congo) Dadju (7)
- Website: afrima.org

The 2022 All Africa Music Awards (also known as AFRIMA) was scheduled to be held on December 8 to 11, 2022. But, it was announced that the ceremony would be held in Dakar, Senegal on January 12 to 15, 2023.

== Winners and nominees ==
The nominations were announced on September 24, 2022. Voting started from September 25, 2022, and ended on January 13, 2023, by popular vote across a pool of 9,067 submitted entries, the most since the first AFRIMA ceremony.

=== Continental categories ===
Album of the Year: (Nigeria) Love, Damini – Burna Boy; (Nigeria) 9: Èsan – Brymo; (South Africa) Amagama – Nomfundo Moh; (Democratic Republic of the Congo) Cullinan – Dadju; (Tanzania) First of All – Diamond Platnumz; (Ivory Coast) History – Didi B; (South Africa) KOA II Part 1 – Kabza de Small; (Nigeria) Rave & Roses – Rema; (Algeria) Sans visa – Soolking; (Mali) Timbuktu – Oumou Sangaré	Artiste of the Year: (Nigeria) Burna Boy – "Last Last"; (Nigeria) CKay – "Emiliana"; (Democratic Republic of the Congo) Dadju – "Ambassaduer"; (Tanzania) Diamond Platnumz – "Mtasubiri" (featuring Zuchu); (Nigeria) Fireboy DML – "Peru (Remix)" (featuring Ed Sheeran); (South Africa) Kabza de Small – "Asibe Happy" (featuring DJ Maphorisa & Ami Faku); (Morocco) Manal – "Makhelaw Magalou"; (Nigeria) Tiwa Savage – "Somebody's Son" (featuring Brandy); (Egypt) Wegz – "ElBakht"; (South Africa) Zakes Bantwini – "Osama" (featuring Kasango)
African Fan's Favorite: (Nigeria) Oxlade – "Ku Lo Sa"; (Ivory Coast) Bello Falcao – "Dibango Dibanga"; (South Africa) Ch'cco, Mellow & Sleazy – "Nkao Tempela"; (Nigeria) (Ghana) Goya Menor & Nektunez – "Ameno Amapiano"; (Nigeria) Joeboy – "Sip (Alcohol)"; (Nigeria) Lojay × Sarz featuring Chris Brown – "Monalisa (Remix)"; (Nigeria) Mavins, Ayra Starr, Boy Spyce, Crayon, Ladipoe & Magixx – "Overloading (Overdose)"; (Sierra Leone) The Therapist – "Nack"; (Nigeria) Young Jonn – "Dada"; (South Africa) Young Stunna featuring Kabza de Small & DJ Maphorisa – "Adiwele"	Best African Video: Kizz Daniel featuring Tekno – "Buga" (Director: TG Omori (Nigeria) ); Chike – "Nwoke Oma" (Director: Director Pink (Nigeria) ); Costa Titch featuring C'buda M, Alfa Kat, Banaba Des, Sdida & Man T – "Big Flexa" (Director: Costa Titch (South Africa) ); DJ Snake – "Disco Maghreb" (Director: Elias Belkader (Algeria) ); Kamo Mphela – "Ghost" (Director: Napephasha (South Africa) ); Kassmasse – "Sewasew" (Director: Maranta Tegegne (Ethiopia) ); Simi – "Woman" (Director: Dammy Twitch (Nigeria) ); Soolking – "Suavemente" (Director: Soolking & Digital Nak (Algeria) )
Best African Act in Diaspora (Male): (Nigeria) Tion Wayne – "Who's True" (featuring Davido & Jae5); (São Tomé and Príncipe) Calema – "Onde Anda" (featuring Zé Felipe); (Democratic Republic of the Congo) Dadju – "King"; (Sudan) Dafencii – "King Alhalaba" (featuring Khayyat); (Algeria) DJ Snake – "Disco Maghreb"; (Cape Verde) Gil Semedo – "Gostu Sabi" (featuring Calema, Soraia Ramos & Mito Kaskas); (Ghana) Jae5 – "Propeller" (featuring Dave & Bnxn); (Democratic Republic of the Congo) Ninho – "VVS"; (Algeria) Soolking – "Suavemente"; (Democratic Republic of the Congo) Ya Levis – "Pardonne Moi"	Best African Act in Diaspora (Female): (Morocco) Faouzia – "RIP, Love"; (Mali) Aya Nakamura – "Degaine" (featuring Damso); (Kenya) Bey T – "Unanicheza" (featuring Boohle); (Nigeria) Darkoo – "Always" (featuring Black Sherif); (Morocco) Marwa Loud – "Ghir Ntiya" (featuring Moha K); (Sierra Leone) Nata – "94"; (Eritrea) Rimon – "Feed Me"; (Cape Verde) Ronisia – "Melodie"; (Democratic Republic of the Congo) Shay – "DA"; (Cape Verde) Soraia Ramos – "BKBN"
Best African Collaboration: (Nigeria) (South Africa) Davido featuring Focalistic – "Champion Sound"; (Egypt) Ahmed Saad featuring 3enba & Double Zuksh – "El Moulouk"; (São Tomé and Príncipe) Calema × Zé Felipe – "Onde Anda"; (South Africa) Costa Titch featuring C'buda M, Alfa Kat, Banaba Des, Sdida & Man T – "Big Flexa"; (Nigeria) Fireboy DML featuring Ed Sheeran – "Peru (Remix)"; (Ivory Coast) (Democratic Republic of the Congo) Kikimoteleba featuring Franglish – "Tigini (Remix)"; (Nigeria) Kizz Daniel featuring Tekno – "Buga"; (Tanzania) Marioo featuring Jovial – "Mi amour"; (Tanzania) (South Africa) Mbosso, Costa Titch & Phantom Steeze – "Moyo"; (Nigeria) Tiwa Savage featuring Brandy – "Somebody's Son"	Best African DJ: (Uganda) DJ Lito – "Tick Talk" (featuring Sheilah Gashumba, Bebe Cool & SlickStuartRoja); (Democratic Republic of the Congo) DJ P2N – "Likolo (Remix)" (featuring Tenor & DJ Amaroula); (Ghana) DJ Sly King – "Ngama Bomo"; (Algeria) DJ Snake – "Disco Maghreb"; (Mozambique) (Nigeria) DJ Tarico & DJ Consequence – "Number One" (featuring Preck & Nelson Tivane); (Namibia) DJ Yessonia – "Ngifuna Wena" (featuring Boohle); (South Africa) DJ Zinhle – "Siyabonga" (featuring Black Motion, Kabza de Small & Nokwazi); (South Africa) Major League DJz – "Bakwa Lah"; (Nigeria) Spinall – "Pallazo" (featuring Asake); (Eswatini) Uncle Waffles – "Tanzania" (featuring Tony Duardo, Sino Msolo & BoiBizza); (South Africa) Zakes Bantwini – "Osama" (featuring Kasango)
Best African Rapper/Lyricist: (Nigeria) LAMB (Loose Kaynon, A-Q, MI & Blaqbonez) – "The Last Cypher"; (South Africa) A-Reece – "Couldn't Have Said It Better, Pt.3"; (Sudan) Dafencii – "King Alhalaba" (featuring Khayyat); (Ivory Coast) Didi B – "Game de Djai"; (Senegal) Dip Doundou Guiss – "Califat"; (Egypt) Marwan Moussa – "Batal 3alam"; (Nigeria) Ladipoe – "Afro Jigga" (featuring Rema); (Sierra Leone) Nata – "94"; (Tanzania) Nay Wa Mitego – "Rais Wa Kitaa"; (Democratic Republic of the Congo) Youssoupha – "Amapiano"	Best African Duo/Group/Band: (Nigeria) The Cavemen – "Biri" (featuring Made Kuti); (São Tomé and Príncipe) Calema – "Onde Anda" (featuring Zé Felipe); (Egypt) Disco Misr – "Ahla Wahda" (featuring Aziz Maraka); (Ethiopia) Jano Band – "Zebnanaw"; (South Africa) Mafikizolo – "Mamazela" (featuring Simmy); (South Africa) Major League DJz – "Bakwa Lah"; (Cameroon) Ridimz – "Shabasiko"; (Togo) Toofan – "Ona"; (Kenya) Umoja Sounds – "Happy" (featuring Ariel Wayz); (Kenya) Wanavokali – "What a Time"
Best Artiste/Duo/Group in African Contemporary: (Nigeria) Adekunle Gold – "Born Again" (featuring Fatoumata Diawara); (Tanzania) Ali Kiba – "UTU"; (Nigeria) Brymo – "Fura Sara"; (Tanzania) Fadhilee Itulya – "Problem" (featuring Fidq & Taz Goemi); (Democratic Republic of the Congo) Fally Ipupa – "Bloqué"; (Ivory Coast) Fior2Bior – "Godo Godo"; (Democratic Republic of the Congo) Roga Roga & Extra Musica – "Bokoko"; (Mali) Sidiki Diabaté – "Diarabi nene bena"; (Senegal) Wally B. Seck – "Reugine Tass" (featuring Viviane); (Egypt) Wegz – "ElBakht"	Best Artiste/Duo/Group in African Dance or Choreography: (Guinea) Ans-T Crazy – "Pause"; (South Africa) Costa Titch featuring C'buda M, Alfa Kat, Banaba Des, Sdida & Man T – "Big Flexa"; (Nigeria) Eltee Skhillz – "ODG"; (South Africa) Kamo Mphela – "Ghost"; (Nigeria) Portable × Poco Lee featuring Olamide – "ZaZoo Zehh"; (Democratic Republic of the Congo) Roga Roga & Extra Musica – "Bokoko"; (Ivory Coast) Serge Beynaud – "C'est Dose"; (Nigeria) Simi – "Woman"; (Uganda) Spice Diana featuring DJ Seven – "Tujooge"; (Togo) Toofan – "Ona"
Best Artiste/Duo/Group in African Electro: (Nigeria) (South Africa) Davido featuring Focalistic – "Champion Sound"; (Nigeria) Asake – "Peace Be Unto You"; (South Africa) Costa Titch featuring C'buda M, Alfa Kat, Banaba Des, Sdida & Man T – "Big Flexa"; (South Africa) DJ Maphorisa & Tyler ICU featuring Sir Trill, Daliwonga & Kabza de Small – "Banyana"; (Namibia) (South Africa) DJ Yessonia featuring Boohle – "Ngifuna Wena"; (South Africa) Felo Le Tee & Myztro featuring Daliwonga – "66 & Dipatje Tsa Felo"; (Tanzania) (South Africa) Mbosso, Costa Titch & Phantom Steeze – "Moyo"; (Democratic Republic of the Congo) (South Africa) Tresor featuring DJ Maphorisa & Kabza de Small – "Makosa"; (South Africa) Zakes Bantwini featuring Kasango – "Osama"	Best Artiste/Duo/Group in African Hip-Hop: (Egypt) Marwan Moussa – "Batal 3alam"; (Ghana) Black Sherif – "Kwaku the Traveller"; (South Africa) Blxckie – "Your All"; (Benin) Cdrik Kodjo – "Nyi Nude"; (Nigeria) Darkoo – "Always" (featuring Black Sherif); (Ivory Coast) Didi B – "Tala"; (Ivory Coast) KikiMoteleba – "Tigini (Remix)" (featuring Franglish); (Tanzania) Nay Wa Mitego – "Rais Wa Kitaa"; (Democratic Republic of the Congo) Ninho – "Jefe"; (Kenya) Nyashinski – "Properly" (featuring Femi One)
Best Artiste/Duo/Group in African Jazz: (Ethiopia) Gutu Abera – "Deemi"; (Ethiopia) Addis Legesse – "Enja"; (Cape Verde) Elida Almeida – "Mau Menino" (featuring Jimmy P); (Cameroon) Franck Biyong – "Negropolitaines"; (Ethiopia) Jano Band – "Zebnanaw"; (Mozambique) Jimmy Dludlu – "Male Ya Pepa" (featuring Rhodalia Silvestre, Dx Nuvunga & Mano Tsotsi); (South Africa) Kelvin Momo – "Funa" (featuring TBO & JaySax); (Rwanda) Somi – "Love Tastes Like Strawberries"; (South Africa) Thapelo Lekoane – "Heritage"; (Nigeria) The Cavemen – "Biri" (featuring Made Kuti)	Best Artiste/Duo/Group in African Pop: (Nigeria) Adekunle Gold – "High" (featuring Davido); (Nigeria) CKay – "Emiliana"; (Nigeria) Kizz Daniel – "Buga" (featuring Tekno); (Morocco) Kouz1 – "Magic"; (Angola) Matias Damásio – "Como antes"; (Nigeria) Pheelz – "Finesse" (featuring Bnxn); (Cape Verde) Ronisia – "Melodie"; (Ivory Coast) Roseline Layo – "Donnez nous un peru"; (Cape Verde) Soraia Ramos – "BKBN"; (Cameroon) Tenor – "Mami Wata" (featuring Innoss'B)
Best Artiste/Duo/Group in African Reggae/Ragga/Dancehall: (Ethiopia) Teddy Afro – "Naet"; (Uganda) DJ Lito – "Tick Talk" (featuring Sheilah Gashumba, Bebe Cool & SlickStuartRoja); (Nigeria) Fave – "Baby Riddim"; (Kenya) Femi One – "Hepi" (featuring King Kaka & Mbithi); (Ghana) KiDi – "Touch It (Remix)" (featuring Tyga); (Tanzania) Navy Kenzo – "Manzese"; (Zimbabwe) Nutty O – "Handipere"; (Tanzania) Rosa Ree – "Watatubu"; (Nigeria) Ruger – "Dior"; (Zimbabwe) Winky D – "Happy Again"	Best Artiste/Duo/Group in African R&B/Soul: (Nigeria) Omah Lay – "I'm A Mess"; (Egypt) Ahmad Basyoni – "ElHalawa Di" (featuring Hussein Gamal); (Kenya) Bridget Blue – "Goodbye"; (Angola) C4 Pedro – "Esta tudo bem"; (Tanzania) Frida Amani – "Duyuwana" (featuring Mayunga); (Ivory Coast) Lil Jay – "Sauce Graine"; (South Africa) Nomfundo Moh – "Phakade Lami" (featuring Sha Sha (singer) & Ami Faku); (Cameroon) Tayc – "D O D O"; (Nigeria) Tiwa Savage – "Tales by Moonlight" (featuring Amaarae); (Democratic Republic of the Congo) Ya Levis – "Pardonne Moi"
Best Artiste/Duo/Group in African Rock: (Nigeria) Clayrocksu – "Amin"; (Egypt) Amir Eid – "Ana Negm"; (South Africa) Daniel Baron – "How to Feel"; (Cameroon) Franck Biyong – "Pepe Soup"; (Kenya) RASH – "FAR BEYOND"; (South Africa) Reën & Refentse – "Skobbejak"	Best Artiste/Duo/Group in African Traditional: (Guinea) Azaya – "BB La" (featuring Djelykaba Bintou); (Ethiopia) Betty G – "Addis Semay"; (Nigeria) Flavour – "Level"; (Ivory Coast) Josey – "Zambeleman" (featuring Bonigo); (Ethiopia) Lencho Gemechu – "Saglii"; (Guinea) Manamba Kante – "Bhouloun Djouri"; (Mali) Oumou Sangaré – "Wassulu Don"; (Mali) Rokia Koné – "N'yanyan" (featuring Jacknife Lee); (Cameroon) Strongbangwaboy – "Royalty" (featuring LongueLongue, TzyPanchak, Kameni & Nyango); (Mozambique) Stewart Sukuma – "Ezamany Kim'bedima"
Best Female Artiste in African Inspirational Music: (Tanzania) Irene Robert – "Hainidhuru" (featuring Rose Mhando); (Kenya) Bridget Blue – "Woman"; (Morocco) Chaama – "Burakia" (with Eljoee); (Ghana) Diana Hamilton – "Awurade Ye (Do It Lord)"; (South Africa) DJ Zinhle – "Siyabonga" (featuring Black Motion, Kabza de Small & Nokwazi); (Kenya) Janet Otieno – "Siri"; (South Africa) Makhadzi – "Zwivhuya" (featuring Jon Delinger); (Morocco) Manal – "3ari"; (Nigeria) TY Bello – "Amen Amen" (featuring Sinmidele & Ore Macaulay)	Best Male Artiste in African Inspirational Music: (Nigeria) Davido – "Stand Strong" (featuring Sunday Service Choir); (Democratic Republic of the Congo) Grace Lokwa – "Kumama"; (Ethiopia) Kassmasse – "Sewasew"; (Ivory Coast) KS Bloom – "C'est Dieu (Remix)" (featuring Chidinma); (Democratic Republic of the Congo) Majoos – "Jayah"; (Nigeria) Masterkraft – "Hosanna" (featuring Chike); (Nigeria) Nathaniel Bassey – "See What the Lord Has Done"; (Kenya) Noel Nderitu – "Waweza"; (South Africa) Samthing Soweto – "Amagents"; (Lesotho) Wave Rhyder – "Wa Nkutlwa Na"
Producer of the Year: (Nigeria) Shizzi for "Peru (Remix)" by Fireboy DML featuring Ed Sheeran; (Angola) C4 Pedro for "Posa" by C4 Pedro; (Nigeria) CKay & BMH for "Emiliana" by CKay; (Tanzania) Kimambobeats for "Mi amour" by Marioo featuring Jovial; (Ivory Coast) (Democratic Republic of the Congo) Nyadjiko & Dadju for "Ambassaduer" by Dadju; (Egypt) Rahal for "ElBakht" by Wegz; (Nigeria) Reward Beats for "Buga" by Kizz Daniel featuring Tekno; (South Africa) Sdida & Man T for "Big Flexa" by Costa Titch featuring C'buda M, Alfa Kat, Banaba Des, Sdida & Man T; (Ivory Coast) Serge Beynaud for "C'est Dose" by Serge Beynaud; (Algeria) Stan-E Kibulu & DJ Snake for "Disco Maghreb" by DJ Snake	Song of the Year: (Ivory Coast) "Tala" – Didi B; (Democratic Republic of the Congo) "Ambassaduer" – Dadju; (South Africa) "Big Flexa" – Costa Titch featuring C'buda M, Alfa Kat, Banaba Des, Sdida & Man T; (Nigeria) "Buga" – Kizz Daniel featuring Tekno; (Nigeria) "Calm Down" – Rema; (Algeria) "Disco Maghreb" – DJ Snake; (Egypt) "ElBakht" – Wegz; (Ghana) "Kwaku the Traveller" – Black Sherif; (Nigeria) "Last Last" – Burna Boy; (Tanzania) "Mi amour" – Marioo featuring Jovial; (Nigeria) "Peru (Remix)" – Fireboy DML featuring Ed Sheeran; (Algeria) "Suavemente" – Soolking
Songwriter of the Year: (Mali) Iba One for "Hommage a mes parents" by Iba One; (Kenya) Bridget Blue & Jibril Blessing for "Woman" by Bridget Blue; (South Africa) Daniel Baron for "How to Feel" by Daniel Baron; (South Africa) Lloyiso Mandlovandile Gigana & Luke Goliath for "Seasons" by Lloyiso; (Kenya) Martin Obudho & Muthaka for "Sorry" by Muthaka; (Angola) Matias Damásio for "Como antes" by Matias Damásio; (Kenya) Mordecai "Dex" Mwini for "Reason" by Wanavokali featuring H_art the Band; (Nigeria) Ọlawale Ọlọfọrọ for "Fura Sara" by Brymo; (Mali) Rokia Koné & Jacknife Lee for "N'yanyan" by Rokia Koné featuring Jacknife Lee; (Senegal) Sidy Diop for "Ngalam" by Sidy Diop	Best Soundtrack in a Movie/Series/Documentary Film: (Nigeria) Tems & Marvel – "No Woman, No Cry" for the film Black Panther: Wakanda Forever; (Egypt) Ahmed Saad featuring 3enba & Double Zuksh – "El Moulouk" for the limited series Moon Knight; (Ghana) Amaarae & Marvel – "A Body, A Coffin" for the film Black Panther: Wakanda Forever; (Egypt) Amir Eid – "Ana Negm" for the limited series Rivo; (Democratic Republic of the Congo) Dadju – "Ima" for the film Ima; (Nigeria) Eltee Skhillz – "ODG" for the film The Blood Covenant; (Egypt) Mohamed Osama & Karim Mahmoud – "EL GHAZALA RAYE2A" for the film For Zeko; (Togo) Stéphane Legar – "SPEED LIFE" for the film Sonic the Hedgehog 2; (Egypt) Wegz – "B3oda Ya Belady" for the film Captains of Zaatari
Breakout Artist of the Year: (Nigeria) Asake – "Peace Be Unto You"; (Ghana) Camidoh – "Sugarcane (Remix)" (featuring Mayorkun, King Promise & Darkoo); (South Africa) Costa Titch – "Ma Gang" (with Champuru Makhenzo featuring Phantom Steeze, ManT, Sdida & C'buda M); (South Africa) Daliwonga – "Abo Mvelo" (featuring Mellow & Sleazy and M.J); (Morocco) ElGrandeToto – "Salade Coco"; (Ivory Coast) Fior2Bior – "Godo Godo"; (Ethiopia) Hewan Gebrewold – "Shemuna"; (Egypt) Marwan Moussa – "Batal 3alam"; (South Africa) Nomfundo Moh – "Phakade Lami" (featuring Sha Sha (singer) & Ami Faku); (Nigeria) Pheelz – "Finesse" (featuring Bnxn)	Most Promising Artist: (Guinea) Ans-T Crazy – "10 Na ifari" (featuring Ibro Gnamet); (Sudan) Dafencii – "King Alhalaba" (featuring Khayyat); (Nigeria) Fave – "Baby Riddim"; (Tanzania) Frida Amani – "Fala Mimi"; (Senegal) Jeeba – "Lamou Saff"; (South Africa) Khanyisa – "Bheka Mina Ngedwa" (featuring Tsiki XII, Marcus MC & Lady Du); (Ivory Coast) KikiMoteleba – "Tigini (Remix)" (featuring Franglish); (South Africa) Lloyiso – "Speak"; (Nigeria) Magixx – "Love Don't Cost a Dime" (featuring Ayra Starr); (Democratic Republic of the Congo) Zara Williams – "Posa" (featuring C4 Pedro)
Best Global Act: (Brazil) Anitta; (United States) Brandy; (United States) Chris Brown; (Canada) Drake; (United Kingdom) Ed Sheeran; (Canada) Justin Bieber; (Colombia) Maluma; (Jamaica) Popcaan; (United States) Tyga; (France) Vitaa

=== Regional categories ===
==== Central Africa ====
Best Female Artiste in Central Africa: (Cameroon) Asaba – "Mon bebe"; (Cameroon) Blanche Bailly – "Mine" (featuring Joeboy); (Gabon) Emma'a – "Encré"; (Gabon) Espoir La Tigresse – "Abiane"; (Angola) Perola – "Sincera"; (Democratic Republic of the Congo) Shay – "DA"; (Cameroon) Vernyuy Tina – "Ndani Ya"; (Democratic Republic of the Congo) Zara Williams – "Posa" (featuring C4 Pedro)	Best Male Artiste in Central Africa: (Democratic Republic of the Congo) Fally Ipupa – "Bloqué"; (Angola) C4 Pedro – "Esta Tudo Bem"; (Democratic Republic of the Congo) Dadju – "Ambassadeur"; (Democratic Republic of the Congo) Gaz Mawete – "500"; (Democratic Republic of the Congo) Innoss'B – "Mortel-06"; (Angola) Matias Damásio – "Como antes"; (Democratic Republic of the Congo) Ninho – "Jefe"; (Democratic Republic of the Congo) Roga Roga & Extra Musica – "Bokoko"; (Cameroon) Tayc – "Dodo"; (Cameroon) Tenor – "Mami Wata" (featuring Innoss'B)

==== Eastern Africa ====
Best Female Artiste in Eastern Africa: (Kenya) Muthaka – "Sorry"; (Ethiopia) Betty G – "Addis Semay"; (Tanzania) Frida Amani – "Fala Mimi"; (Ethiopia) Hewan Gebrewold – "Shemuna"; (Tanzania) Nandy – "Siwezi"; (Kenya) Nikita Kering – "Last Name"; (Tanzania) Rosa Ree – "Watatubu"; (Uganda) Spice Diana – "Tujooge" (featuring DJ Seven); (Kenya) Tanasha Donna – "Maradonna"; (Tanzania) Zuchu – "Kitu" (featuring Bontle Smith & Tyler ICU)	Best Male Artiste in Eastern Africa: (Ethiopia) Kassmasse – "Sewasew"; (Ethiopia) Addis Legesse – "Enja"; (Kenya) Bien – "Bald Men Anthem" (with Aaron Rimbui); (Tanzania) Diamond Platnumz – "Mtasubiri" (featuring Zuchu); (Uganda) Eddy Kenzo – "Songa"; (Uganda) King Saha – "Zakayo"; (Tanzania) Marioo – "Mi amour" (featuring Jovial); (Tanzania) Mbosso – "Moyo" (featuring Costa Titch & Phantom Steeze); (Kenya) Nyashinski – "Properly" (featuring Femi One); (Tanzania) Rayvanny – "Pele Pele" (featuring Vjollca)

==== Northern Africa ====
Best Female Artiste in Northern Africa: (Morocco) Faouzia – "RIP Love"; (Morocco) Jaylann – "Oui Oui"; (Algeria) Kenza Morsli – "Moustahil" (featuring DJ Adel); (Algeria) Lyna Mahyem – "Mal De Toi"; (Morocco) Manal – "Makhelaw Magalou"; (Morocco) Marwa Loud – "Ghir Ntiya" (featuring Moha K); (Egypt) Ruby – "Namet Nenna"; (Morocco) Rym – "Stylo Warqa"	Best Male Artiste in Northern Africa: (Tunisia) A..L..A – "30"; (Egypt) Ali Loka – "Matkhafesh Yamma"; (Egypt) Ahmed Saad – "El Moulouk" (featuring 3enba & Double Zuksh); (Algeria) DJ Snake – "Disco Maghreb"; (Morocco) Draganov – "Chichi"; (Morocco) ElGrandeToto – "Salade Coco"; (Egypt) Marwan Moussa – "Batal 3alam"; (Morocco) Snor – "Kasseta"; (Algeria) Soolking – "Suavemente"; (Egypt) Wegz – "ElBakht"

==== Southern Africa ====
Best Female Artiste in Southern Africa: (South Africa) Makhadzi – "Mama"; (Namibia) DJ Yessonia – "Ngifuna Wena" (featuring Boohle); (South Africa) DJ Zinhle – "Siyabonga" (featuring Black Motion, Kabza de Small & Nokwazi); (South Africa) Kamo Mphela – "Ghost"; (South Africa) Nadia Nakai – "Not the Same" (featuring Lucasraps); (South Africa) Nomfundo Moh – "Phakade Lami" (featuring Sha Sha (singer) & Ami Faku); (Zimbabwe) Sha Sha – "iPiano" (featuring Kamo Mphela & Felo Le Tee); (South Africa) Simmy – "We Were Here"; (Zimbabwe) Tamy Moyo – "Sare"; (Eswatini) Uncle Waffles – "Tanzania" (featuring Tony Duardo, Sino Msolo & BoiBizza)	Best Male Artiste in Southern Africa: (Zimbabwe) Winky D – "Happy Again"; (South Africa) A-Reece – "Couldn't Have Said It Better, Pt.3"; (South Africa) Blxckie – "Sneaky" (featuring A-Reece); (Mozambique) DJ Tarico – "Number One" (with DJ Consequence featuring Preck & Nelson Tivane); (Malawi) Gemini Major – "Ooh Lala" (featuring Ayra Starr); (South Africa) Focalistic – "16 Days No Sleep" (with Madumane & Mellow); (South Africa) Kabza de Small – "Abalele" (featuring DJ Maphorisa); (Namibia) Musketeers – "Danko" (featuring Azmo); (South Africa) Master KG – "Dali Nguwe" (with Wanitwa Mos featuring Nkosa); (South Africa) Zakes Bantwini – "Osama" (featuring Kasango)

==== West Africa ====
Best Female Artiste in West Africa: (Ivory Coast) Josey – "Zambeleman" (featuring Bonigo); (Nigeria) Aṣa – "Ocean"; (Ghana) Gyakie – "Something"; (Guinea) Manamba Kante – "Bhouloun Djouri"; (Mali) Oumou Sangaré – "Wassulu Don"; (Nigeria) Simi – "Woman"; (Cape Verde) Soraia Ramos – "BKBN"; (Nigeria) Tems – "Crazy"; (Nigeria) Tiwa Savage – "Somebody's Son" (featuring Brandy); (Senegal) Viviane Chedid – "Sweet Game"	Best Male Artiste in West Africa: (Ghana) Black Sherif – "Kwaku the Traveller"; (Nigeria) Burna Boy – "Last Last"; (Ivory Coast) Didi B – "Tala"; (Nigeria) Fireboy DML – "Peru (Remix)" (featuring Ed Sheeran); (Nigeria) Kizz Daniel – "Buga" (featuring Tekno); (Nigeria) Rema – "Calm Down"; (Ivory Coast) Serge Beynaud – "C'est Dose"; (Mali) Sidiki Diabaté – "Diarabi nene bena"; (Senegal) Wally B. Seck – "Reugine Tass" (featuring Viviane); (Nigeria) Wizkid – "Anoti"

== Multiple nominations and awards ==
=== By artist ===
Nominations

Nom(s)	Artist(s)
7	(South Africa) Costa Titch, (Democratic Republic of the Congo) Dadju
5	(Ivory Coast) Didi B, (Algeria) DJ Snake, (Algeria) Soolking, (Egypt) Wegz
4	(Nigeria) Burna Boy, (Nigeria) Fireboy DML, (South Africa) Kabza de Small, (Nigeria) Kizz Daniel, (Egypt) Marwan Moussa, (South Africa) Nomfundo Moh, (Nigeria) Tiwa Savage, (South Africa) Zakes Bantwini
3	(Egypt) Ahmed Saad, (Ghana) Black Sherif, (Kenya) Bridget Blue, (Nigeria) Brymo, (Angola) C4 Pedro, (São Tomé and Príncipe) Calema, (Nigeria) CKay, (Sudan) Dafencii, (Nigeria) Davido, (Tanzania) Diamond Platnumz, (Namibia) DJ Yessonia, (South Africa) DJ Zinhle, (Tanzania) Frida Amani, (Ivory Coast) KikiMoleteba, (South Africa) Man T, (Morocco) Manal, (Democratic Republic of the Congo) Ninho, (Mali) Oumou Sangaré, (Nigeria) Rema, (South Africa) Sdida, (Ivory Coast) Serge Beynaud, (Cape Verde) Soraia Ramos, (Tanzania) Marioo, (Angola) Matias Damásio, (Tanzania) Mbosso
2	(Egypt) 3enba, (South Africa) A-Reece, (Ethiopia) Addis Legesse, (Nigeria) Adekunle Gold, (South Africa) Alfa Kat, (Egypt) Amir Eid, (Guinea) Ans-T Crazy, (Nigeria) Asake, (South Africa) Banaba Des, (Ethiopia) Betty G, (South Africa) Blxckie, (Nigeria) The Cavemen, (South Africa) C'buda M, (South Africa) Daniel Baron, (Nigeria) Darkoo, (Uganda) DJ Lito, (South Africa) DJ Maphorisa, (Mozambique) DJ Tarico, (Egypt) Double Zuksh, (Morocco) ElGrandeToto, (Nigeria) Eltee Skhillz, (Democratic Republic of the Congo) Fally Ipupa, (Morocco) Faouzia, (Nigeria) Fave, (Ivory Coast) Fior2Bior, (South Africa) Focalistic, (Cameroon) Franck Biyong, (Ethiopia) Hewan Gebrewold, (Ethiopia) Jano Band, (Ivory Coast) Josey, (Kenya) Jovial, (South Africa) Kamo Mphela, (Ethiopia) Kassmasse, (Nigeria) Ladipoe, (South Africa) Lloyiso, (Nigeria) Magixx, (South Africa) Major League DJz, (South Africa) Makhadzi, (Guinea) Manamba Kante, (Morocco) Marwa Loud, (Kenya) Muthaka, (Sierra Leone) Nata, (Tanzania) Nay Wa Mitego, (Kenya) Nyashinski, (Nigeria) Pheelz, (Democratic Republic of the Congo) Roga Roga & Extra Musica, (Mali) Rokia Koné, (Cape Verde) Ronisia, (Tanzania) Rosa Ree, (Democratic Republic of the Congo) Shay, (Mali) Sidiki Diabaté, (Nigeria) Simi, (Uganda) Spice Diana, (Cameroon) Tayc, (Nigeria) Tekno, (Nigeria) Tems, (Cameroon) Tenor, (Togo) Toofan, (Eswatini) Uncle Waffles, (Senegal) Wally B. Seck, (Zimbabwe) Winky D, (Democratic Republic of the Congo) Ya Levis, (Democratic Republic of the Congo) Zara Williams

=== By country ===
Country	Nom(s)	Award(s)
Algeria	13	TBA
Angola	7	TBA
Benin	1	TBA
Cameroon	11	TBA
Cape Verde	7	TBA
Democratic Republic of the Congo	29	TBA
Egypt	20	TBA
Eritrea	1	TBA
Eswatini	2	TBA
Ethiopia	14	TBA
Gabon	2	TBA
Ghana	11	TBA
Guinea	5	TBA
Ivory Coast	20	TBA
Kenya	20	TBA
Lesotho	1	TBA
Malawi	1	TBA
Mali	9	TBA
Morocco	15	TBA
Mozambique	4	TBA
Namibia	4	TBA
Nigeria	72	TBA
Rwanda	1	TBA
São Tomé and Príncipe	3	TBA
Senegal	6	TBA
Sierra Leone	3	TBA
South Africa	53	TBA
Sudan	3	TBA
Tanzania	24	TBA
Togo	3	TBA
Tunisia	1	TBA
Uganda	6	TBA
Zimbabwe	5	TBA
