= All Africa Music Awards 2021 =

2021 edition of the All Africa Music Awards

2021 All Africa Music Awards
- Date: November 22, 2021
- Venue: Eko Convention Centre, Lagos, Nigeria
- Country: Nigeria
- Hosted by: Pearl Thusi and Eddie Kadi

Highlights
- Most awards: Iba One (Mali)
- Most nominations: Blaq Diamond (South Africa)
- Website: afrima.org

The 2021 All Africa Music Awards (also known as AFRIMA), were held on November 21, at the Eko Convention Centre in Lagos, Nigeria. This marked the fifth time in eight years that the venue is hosting the show. The show was hosted by South African actress Pearl Thusi, and British-Congolese comedian Eddie Kadi.

The ceremony, under the theme ‘Still We Sing’, was broadcast on DSTV channel 198, GOTV 98, HIPTV, TVC, PlusTV Africa, AIT and AfroMusicPop among others. AFRIMA has taken place each year since 2014, except in 2020, owing to the coronavirus pandemic.

Iba One from Mali, and Wizkid were the most awarded artists of the night with five and three awards respectively, followed by Kenya's Nikita Kering. Beyoncé bagged the ‘Best Global Act’ award, as the D.R. Congo's Koffi Olomide was gifted the "Legend Award".

== Winners and nominees ==
Nominations were announced on September 22, 2021, by the International Committee of All Africa Music Awards. Leading the list of nominees was South African duo, Blaq Diamond with eight nominations, followed by Focalistic with seven. Wizkid, Omah Lay and Gyakie followed, with six, four and three nominations respectively. Voting for the 28 continental and 10 regional award categories took place from September 27, 2021.

Winners are listed first and in bold.

List of winners and nominees for the 2021 All Africa Music Awards
REGIONAL AWARDS
Best Female in Central Africa	Best Male in Central Africa
**Shan'L - Gabon**; Anna Joyce - Angola; Blanche Bailly - Cameroon; Charlotte Dipanda - Cameroon; Edmazia Mayembe - Angola; Eyango - Cameroon; Mimi - Cameroon; Rebo Tchulo - DR Congo; Perola - Angola; T'neeya - Cameroon	**Fally Ipupa - DR Congo**; C4 Pedro - Angola; Calema - São Tomé and Príncipe; Ferre Gola - DR Congo; GIMS - DR Congo; Inoss'B - DR Congo; Koffi Olomide - DR Congo; Locko - Cameroon; Rui Orlando - Angola; Salatiel & Rutshelle Guillaume - Cameroon
Best Female in Eastern Africa	Best Male in Eastern Africa
**Nikita Kering - Kenya**; Afrie - Uganda; Karun - Kenya; Merry Zerabruk - Eritrea; Nandy (singer) - Tanzania; Rema Namakula - Uganda; Rosa Ree - Tanzania; Spice Diana - Tanzania; Xenia Mannasseh - Kenya; Zuchu - Tanzania	**Eddy Kenzo - Uganda**; Bensoul - Kenya; Darassa - Tanzania; Diamond Platnumz - Tanzania; Harmonize - Tanzania; Lij mic - Ethiopia; Meddy - Rwanda; Nviiri The Storyteller - Kenya; Rayvanny - Tanzania; Sauti Sol - Kenya
Best Female in Northern Africa	Best Male in Northern Africa
**Manal - Morocco**; Abir Yacht - Morocco; Emel Mathlouthi - Tunisia; Haidy Moussa - Egypt; Jaylan - Morocco; Latifa - Tunisia; Nada - Morocco; Salma Rachid - Morocco; Ruby - Egypt; Samira Said - Egypt	**Dizzy - Morocco**; Amr Diab - Egypt; DJ Moh Green - Algeria; Hamza El Fadly - Morocco; Klay BBJ - Tunisia; L7OR - Morocco; Mohamed Ramadan (feat. Maitre Gims) - Egypt & DR Congo; Muslim - Morocco; Soolking - Algeria; Zouhair Bahaoui - Morocco
Best Female Southern Africa	Best Male Southern Africa
**Cleo Ice Queen - Zambia**; Busiswa - South Africa; DJ Zinhle - South Africa; Kamo Mphela - South Africa; Kelly Khumalo - South Africa; Makhadzi - South Africa; Nomcebo Zikode - South Africa; Sha Sha (singer) - Zimbabwe; Shekinah - South Africa; Tamy Moyo - Zimbabwe; Zanda Zakuza - South Africa	**Blaq Diamond - South Africa**; Casper Nyovest - South Africa; Dj Tarico - Mozambique; Focalistic - South Africa; Jah Prayzah - Zimbabwe; Major League DJz - South Africa; Mapara A Jazz - South Africa; Mi Casa - South Africa; Mr JazziQ - South Africa; Nasty C - South Africa; Sun-El Musician - South Africa
Best Female Western Africa	Best Male Western Africa
**Djelykaba Bintou - Guinea**; Aya Nakamura - Mali; Gyakie - Ghana; Josey - Ivory Coast; Manamba Kanté - Guinea; Niniola - Nigeria; Soraia Ramos - Cape Verde; Tems - Nigeria; TENI - Nigeria; Tiwa Savage - Nigeria; Yemi Alade - Nigeria	**Iba One - Mali**; Burna Boy - Nigeria; Davido - Nigeria; Djodje - Cape Verde; KiDi - Ghana; MHD (rapper) - Guinea; Nelson Freitas - Cape Verde; Olamide - Nigeria; Omah Lay - Nigeria; Stonebwoy - Ghana; WizKid - Nigeria
CONTINENTAL AWARDS
African Fan's Favourite	Album of the Year
**Fireboy DML - Nigeria**; Dadju - DRC; Buju - Nigeria; Dj Cleo - South Africa; Guchi - Nigeria; Kikimoteleba - Ivory Coast; Master KG - South Africa; Rexxie - Nigeria; Ali Kiba - Tanzania; Zinoleesky - Nigeria	**Iba One - 'Mon Empire' - Mali**; Aya Nakamura - 'Aya (album)' - Mali; Burna Boy - 'Twice as Tall' - Nigeria; Davido - 'A Better Time' - Nigeria; Fally Ipupa - 'Tokooos II' - DRC; Maitre Gims - 'Le Fleau' - DRC; MHD (rapper) - 'Mansa' - Guinea; Olamide - 'Carpe Diem (Olamide album)' - Nigeria; Tayc - 'Fleur Froide' - Cameroon; Tiwa Savage - 'Celia (album)' - Nigeria; Wizkid - 'Made In Lagos' - Nigeria
Best African Act in the Diaspora (Female)	Best African Act in the Diaspora (Male)
**NAOMI ACHU - Cameroon / United States**; ABIR - Morocco / United States; Aya Nakamura (feat. Stormzy) - Mali / France; Ms Banks - Nigeria / United Kingdom; Nata - Sierra Leone / United States; Rimon (feat. EarthGang) - Eritrea/Netherlands; Shaybo (feat. haile) - Nigeria / United Kingdom	**Rotimi - Nigeria & United States**; Nelson Freitas - Cape Verde & Portugal; Dave (feat. Stormzy) Clash Nigeria & United Kingdom; Double S - Uganda & United Kingdom; Headie One (ft. Burna Boy) - Ghana & United Kingdom; JAE5 (feat. Skepta, Rema (musician)) - Ghana & United Kingdom; MHD (rapper) (feat. Tiakola) - Guinea & France; Tayc - Cameroon & France; Tion Wayne & Russ Millions - Nigeria & UK
Artiste of the Year	Best African Collaboration
**WizKid - Nigeria**; Aya Nakamura - Mali; Blaq Diamond - South Africa; Burna Boy - Nigeria; Davido - Nigeria; Diamond Platnumz - Tanzania; Fally Ipupa - DR Congo; Focalistic - South Africa; Makhadzi - South Africa; MHD (rapper) - Guinea; Omah Lay - Nigeria	**Wizkid (feat. Tems) - 'Essence (song)' - Nigeria**; Bella Shmurda, Zlatan & Lincoln - 'Cash App' - Nigeria; Calema (feat. Pérola, Soraia Ramos & Manecas Costa) Kua Buaru São Tomé and Príncipe, Angola, Cape Verde & Guinea Bissau; Diamond Platnumz (feat. Koffi Olomide) - 'Waah' - Tanzania & DR Congo; Dj Tarico (feat. Burnaboy, Preck & Nelson Tivane) - 'Yaba buluku (remix)' - Mozambique & Nigeria; Focalistic & Davido [Feat. Vigro Deep] - 'Ke Star (Remix)' - South Africa & Nigeria; Gyakie (feat. Omah Lay) - 'Forever (remix)' - Ghana & Nigeria; Ladipoe (feat. Buju) - 'Feeling' - Nigeria; Mohamed Ramadan (feat. Maitre Gim) - 'Ya habibi' - Egypt & DR Congo; Nandy (feat. Joeboy) - 'Number One' - Tanzania & Nigeria; Shan'L (feat. Fally Ipupa) - 'Où est le mariage' - Gabon & DR Congo
Best African DJ	Best African Group, Duo or Band
**Dj Sinyorita - Tanzania**; DJ Moh Green - Algeria; Black Coffee - South Africa; DJ Cuppy - Nigeria; Dj Impossible - Angola; DJ KayWise Ft Phyno - Nigeria; Dj Mix premier - Côte d'Ivoire; Dj Sly - Ghana; DJ SPINALL - Nigeria; Major League DJz & Abidoza - South Africa	**Sauti Sol - Kenya**; Ajebo Hustlers (feat. Omah Lay) - Nigeria; B2C Entertainment (Kampala Boys) - Uganda; Blaq Diamond - South Africa; Calema (feat. Pérola, Soraia Ramos & Manecas Costa) Kua Buaru São Tomé and Príncipe; Cavemen Selense Nigeria; Chelsy & Nsoki Vou Arriscar Angola; Mi Casa - South Africa; The Isomers - Nigeria; Toofan - Togo
Best African Rapper of Lyricist	Best African Video
**Elow'n - Côte d'Ivoire**; A-Q - Nigeria; Dip Doundou Guiss - Senegal; Khaligraph Jones - Kenya; Ko-C - Cameroon; Ladipoe - Nigeria; Nasty C - South Africa; Nata - Sierra Leone; Sarkodie - Ghana; Vector - Nigeria	**Steven Awuku - Kobolé - King Alasko - Guinea**; Dammy Twitch - Berna Reloaded -Flavour (musician) feat. Fally Ipupa & Diamond Platnumz) - Nigeria; Director Kenny - Waah - Diamond Platnumz feat. Koffi Olomide - Tanzania; Kwanda Lima - Djodje - Bella - Cape Verde; Hosssam L Hossainy - Ya Habibi (Maitre Gims & Mohammed ramadan) - Egypt; Rex - Show body (Kuami Eugene feat. Falz) - Ghana; Prior Gold - Abule - Patoranking - Nigeria; Roadman - Nairobi - Bensoul (feat. Sauti Sol, Nviiri the Storyteller, Mejja - Kenya; Unlimited - LA Paloma (Mr. P (singer) feat. Singah) - Nigeria
Best Artiste, Duo or Group in African R&B Soul	Best Artiste, Duo or Group in African Reggae, Ragga or Dancehall
**Nikita Kering - Ex - Kenya**; Adekunle Gold (feat. Lucky Daye) - Sinner - Nigeria; Aya Nakamura(feat. Stormzy) - Plus Jamais - Mali; Djodje Tempo Sabi - Cape Verde; Elaine (singer) - Right now - South Africa; Gyakie (feat. Omah Lay) Forever (remix) - Ghana; Oxlade (singer) - Ojuju - Nigeria; Tems - Damages (song) - Nigeria; T'neeya - Dark Twisted Fantasy - Cameroon; Wizkid (feat. Tems) - 'Essence (song)' - Nigeria	**Stonebwoy (feat. Davido) - Activate - Ghana**; A2 Di Fulani - ta tewto - The Gambia; Bebe Cool - make a wish - Uganda; EXQ Ft Tock Vibes - Wakatemba - Zimbabwe; Mykey Shewa - Fendata - Ethiopia; Natty O - Safe - Zimbabwe; Patoranking - Abule - Nigeria; Rosa Ree (rapper) - That Gal - Tanzania; Ruger - Bounce - Nigeria; Shatta Wale 1 Don Ghana
Best Artiste, Duo or Group in African Dance or Choreography	Best Artiste, Duo or Group in African Hip Hop
**Flavour (musician) feat. Fally Ipupa & Diamond Platnumz) - Berna Reloaded - Nigeria**; Diamond Platnumz feat. Koffi Olomide - Waah - Tanzania; Dwp Academy, Dancegod lloyd & AfroBeast - Corner der - Ghana; Focalistic & Davido (Feat. Vigro Deep) - 'Ke Star (Remix)' - South Africa; Innoss'B - Meme - DR Congo; Rayvanny - Kelebe - Tanzania; Rebo Tchulo - Mbote - DR Congo; Yemi Alade - Dancina - Nigeria; Safarel Obiang - Chara dance - Ivory Coast	**Cheque (feat. Fireboy DML) History Nigeria**; A-Q (feat. Chike) - Breath - Nigeria; Black Sherif - Second Sermon - Ghana; Blaqbonez (feat. Amaarae & Buju) - Bling - Nigeria; Blxckie (feat. Nasty C) - Ye x4 - South Africa; Cassper Nyovest (feat. Busiswa & Legendary P) - Nokuthula - South Africa; Ko-C - President Du Rap publique - Cameroon; Rosa Ree (rapper) - Satan - Tanzania; Vector(feat. GoodGirl LA) - Early Momo - Nigeria; Yaw Tog (feat. Stormzy & Kwesi Arthur) - Sore (Remix) - Ghana
Best Artiste, Duo or Group in African Jazz	Best Artiste, Duo or Group in African Rock
**Hornsphere - Dance - Kenya**; Bokani Dyer - Kalakuta - South Africa; Franck Biyong - Eulogy for biafra - Cameroon; Jimmy Dludlu - tara tara - Mozambique; Made Kuti - Free your Mind - Nigeria; Olu - god save the queen - Nigeria; Thandi Ntuli - Dikeledi - South Africa; Tomi Owo - Beautiful - Nigeria; Zoe Modiga - Umdali - South Africa	**RASH - Structures - Kenya**; Dark Suburb - Kelewele - Ghana; Franck Biyong - Peace in Limbe - Cameroon; Tetu Shani - Furukazi - Kenya; The Isomers - Beat Time - Nigeria
Best Artiste, Duo or Group in African Traditional	Best Artiste, Duo or Group in African Contemporary
**Yonas Maynas - Hamida - Eritrea**; Ayeah Leonnette - Nini - Cameroon; Cavemen - Osondu - Nigeria; Kcee & Okwesili Eze Group - Cultural Praise Vol.1 - Nigeria; kid tini ft sbahle - Amen - South Africa; K1 De Ultimate - Ade Ori Okin - Nigeria; Larry Gaaga (feat. Umu Obiligbo & Davido) - Doubting Thomas - Nigeria; Malome Vector - Nobody - South Africa; Meselu Fantahuh - Yawokebetina - Ethiopia; Paulo Flores - Semba Original - Angola; SHANAH - God Will Make A Way - Kenya; SHIVANAH - Africa - Uganda	**Majoos (feat. Koffi Olomide) - Ndoto - DR Congo**; Soolking - Fada - Algeria; Borgia (feat. Jack Inga) - Ngayi - DR Congo; Chike(feat. Simi) - Running to you - Nigeria; Ferre Gola - Regarde Moi - DR Congo; Kizz Daniel - LIE - Nigeria; Locko - Au Mariage de ma Go - Cameroon; Lojay & SARZ - Monalisa - Nigeria; Platini P - Atansiyo - Rwanda; Salatiel (feat. Rutshelle Guillaume) - Good Girl - Cameroon
Best Artiste, Duo or Group in African Electro	Best Artiste, Duo or Group in African Pop
**Makhadzi - South Africa**; Wally Seck - Senegal; Casper Nyovest - South Africa; Nomcebo Zikode - South Africa; Dj Tarico - Mozambique; Kamo Mphela - South Africa; Naira Marley - Nigeria; Focalistic - South Africa; Niniola - Nigeria; Mapara A Jazz - South Africa	**Iba One (feat. Oumou Sangare) Education Mali**; Abir Yacht - Morocco; Bella Shmurda - Nigeria; Blaq Diamond - South Africa; Djelykaba Bintou - Guinea; Joeboy - Nigeria; KiDi - Ghana; Locko - Cameroon; Olakira - Nigeria; Omah Lay - Nigeria; Rema (musician) - Nigeria
Best Female Artiste in African Inspirational Music	Best Male Artiste in African Inspirational Music
**Shanah Manjeru**; Ada Ehi ft Buchi - Congratulations - Nigeria; Afrie - I Am An African Girl - Uganda; Eden - Ayo - Côte d'Ivoire; Kamo Mphela - Nkulunkulu - South Africa; Montess - Small Girl Big God - Cameroon; Nata - Art Thou - Sierra Leone; Ruth Asong - Jireh - Cameroon; Diana Hamilton - Adom Wisdom - Ghana; Kelly Khumalo - Empini - South Africa	**Iba One (feat. Oumou Sangare) - Education - Mali**; Ali Mukhwana - Maombi Yangu - Kenya; Ashs The Best - Xel Akk Xol - Senegal; Azaya - Allah LÉ Kabon - Guinea; Blaq Diamond (feat. Dumi Mkokstad) - Messiah - South Africa; Ferre Gola - Regarde Moi - DR Congo; Icha Kavons - Faithfull till the end - DR Congo; Mister Elad (feat. Cleo Grae) - Salute - Cameroon; Patoranking - Celebrate me - Nigeria; Sjava - Umcebo - South Africa; TZY Panchak (feat. Kameni & Stanley Enow) - Amin - Cameroon
Best Global Act	Breakout Artiste of the Year
**Beyonce**; Faouzia; Drake; Doja Cat; H.E.R.; Bruno Mars; Ed Sheeran; Olivia Rodrigo; The Weekend	**Djelykaba Bintou - Guinea**; Aveiro Djess - Cameroon; Bella Shmurda - Nigeria; Blaq Diamond - South Africa; Focalistic - South Africa; Omah Lay - Nigeria; Remy Adan - Côte d'Ivoire; Tems - Nigeria; Yaw tog - Ghana; Zuchu - Tanzania
Most Promising African Artiste	Producer of the Year
**El Grande Toto - Morocco**; Ayra Starr - Nigeria; Blxckie - South Africa; Buju - Nigeria; CKay - Nigeria; Iss 814 - Senegal; Lojay - Nigeria; Rebo Tchulo - DR Congo; Ruger - Nigeria; Xenia Manasseh - Kenya	**Legendury Beatz - 'Essence (feat. Tems)' - Nigeria**; Blaq Diamond - 'SummerYomuthi' - South Africa; Dj Tarico - 'Yaba Buluku (remix)' - Mozambique; Kolber Prod 'Le gout de' - Ivory Coast; Lizer Classic - 'Waah' - Tanzania; Napji - 'FEM' - Nigeria; Olakira - 'In My Maserati' - Nigeria; P Prime - 'Infinity' - Nigeria; Telz - 'Abule' - Nigeria; Vigro Deep - 'Ke Star(remix)' - South Africa
Song of the Year	Songwriter of the Year
**WizKid (ft. Tems) - Essence - Nigeria**; Blaq Diamond - SummerYoMuthi - South Africa; Davido - FEM - Nigeria; Diamond Platnumz (feat. Koffi Olomide) - Waah - Tanzania; Dj Tarico(feat. Burna Boy, Preck & Nelson) - Yaba buluku (remix) - Mozambique; Focalistic (Feat. Davido & Virgo Deep) - Ke Star (Remix) - South Africa; Olakira (feat. Davido) - In my Maserati (remix) - Nigeria; Olamide (feat. Omah Lay) - Infinity - Nigeria; Patoranking - Abule - Nigeria; Rayvanny (feat. Zuchu) - Number One - Tanzania; Remy Adan - Le Gout De - Ivory Coast	**Iba One - Education (feat. Oumou Sangare) - Mali**; Nikita Kering - Ex - Kenya; Nasty C - Black & White (feat. Ari lennox) - South Africa; Adekunle Gold, Lucky Daye & Marcel Akunwata - Sinner (feat. Lucky Daye) - Nigeria; Bensoul (feat, Sauti Sol, Nviiri The Storyteller & Mejja) - Nairobi - Kenya; Kelly Khumalo - Empini - South Africa; Tiwa Savage, Mystro & Vitoralli - Koroba - Nigeria; Fally Ipupa, Julio Masidi, The Guest & Dadju Nsungula - Un Coup(feat. Dadju) - DR Congo; Vector, BY LINX & GoodGirl LA - Early Momo(feat. Goodgirl LA) - Nigeria; Manal - 3iytou LBOULISS - Morocco
AFRIMA Legend Award
**Koffi Olomide - D.R. Congo**
AFRIMA Lifetime Achievement Award
**Opal Lee - United States**
