= Bobby Lash B2C =

Ugandan musician

- Also known as: Bobby Lash B2C
- Born: Ssali Peterson; 20 April 1992 (age 34); Namirembe Hospital
- Origin: Kampala
- Genre: Afro Beat
- Occupation: Musician
- Years active: 2016–present
- Label: B2C Entertainment
- Member of: B2C Entertainment

Ssali Peterson professionally known as Bobby Lash B2C is a Ugandan musician born on 20 April 1992 from Namirembe Hospital in Kampala District in Uganda. Bobby Lash was born to the family of Mr. Ssali Peter and Mrs. Nabukeera Teopista. He is a professional musician signed under the B2C Entertainment record label since 2016.

== Education background ==
Bobby Lash started education at Lwagula memorial primary school found in Makindye division in 1998 up to 2005 when he completed his primary level education. He later joined Crested secondary school in Makindye Division in Kampala District for ordinary level of education. Bobby Lash completed his secondary education in 2011 with an advanced certificate of education from Uganda National Examinations Board. During school time, Bobby Lash started music with fellow students (Delivad Julio), (Mr. Lee B2C) and formed their music trio called Born To Conquer alias B2C Entertainment

== Career ==
At a young age, Bobby Lash started professional music in 2016 with a breakthrough song titled Tokigeza after he had left school. Tokigeza was produced by the famous music producer known as Diggy Baur from Sound Cover records the current Mwoto Studio. Tokigeza won the best song of the year based on the fans' choice in the Uganda Music Awards "Teenz category" in 2016. Bobby Lash has managed to release a number of hit songs and collaborations as the B2C trio name.

== Afrima nomination ==
Bobby Lash together with fellow group members (Delivad Julio) and (Mr. Lee B2C) were nominated for the All Africa Music Awards 2021 after their charting hit song collaboration with fellow Ugandan singer David Lutalo titled Awo. The Ugandan trio was nominated with notable top African musicians like Toofan from Togo, Sauti Sol and Mi Casa. Bobby Lash and the fellow members (Delivad Julio and Mr. Lee B2C) did not emerge as winners of the award category but this nomination increased their popularity and fame as Uganda's breakthrough artists.

== Awards won ==
Bobby Lash has won different awards in his career together with his record label known as B2C Entertainment. Below are the awards he has won.

=== Awards and nominations ===
2021 – Hipipo Awards

- Best zouk song (Gutujja) ft Rema Namakula
- Best collaboration (Gutujja)

2021 – Janzi Awards

- Outstanding Afro zouk artist of the year

2018 – Zzina Awards

- Song of the year (Gutamiza) featuring Goodlyfe Crew
- Best Collaboration (Gutamiza)
- Best Afro Beat song (Nyongera)

2017 – Uganda Entertainment Awards

- Best music group
