= Mr. Lee B2C =

Ugandan musician

- Also known as: Mr. Lee B2C
- Born: Mugisha Richard; 24 January 1992 (age 34); Nsambya Hospital
- Origin: Kampala
- Genre: Afro Beat
- Occupation: Musician
- Years active: 2016–present
- Label: B2C Entertainment
- Member of: B2C Entertainment Limited

Mugisha Richard, professionally known as Mr. Lee B2C, is a Ugandan musician born on 24 January 1992. Mr. Lee B2C was born from Nsambya Hospital in Kampala from the family of Mr. Mugisha Joseph and the late Busingye Beatrice Mugisha. He is a professional musician signed under the B2C Entertainment (B2C).

== Education background ==
He started his education from Buganda road primary school located in Kampala. At a young age, Mr. Lee B2C had passion for music as he always practiced in music activities organized by the school. He achieved a primary leaving certificate in 2006. He later joined Crested Secondary School in Makindye Division in Kampala for his ordinary level education in 2007. He teamed up with fellow students (Bobby Lash B2C and Delivad Julio) to start up a music group in school. The trio formed Born 2 Conquer (B2C) while in their senior two class. In 2010, Mr Lee B2C achieved an ordinary level certificate of education from Uganda National Examinations Board.

== Career ==
Born and raised from Kampala District the capital of Uganda, Mr. Lee B2C started professional music in 2016 with a breakthrough song titled Tokigeza produced by producer Baur. This song brought Mr. Lee and B2C as a record label to the music industry. It emerged as a best song based on fans' choice in The Uganda Music Awards "Teenz Choice" category. Mr. Lee has managed to release lots of music collaborations since his career started both with local and international artists.

== Afrima nomination ==
Mr. Lee B2C and his musical partners (Delivad Julio) and (Bobby Lash B2C) were nominated in the All Africa Music Awards 2021 in 2019 and 2021. These nominations were in recognition of their top charting collaboration with David Lutalo titled Awo. They had also been nominated as the best African music group in 2019. The trio was nominated alongside notable African artists like Toofan from Togo, Sauti Sol from Kenya and Mi Casa from South Africa. Although they did not emerge as winners, the nomination brought to them more local and international awareness in their career.

== Awards won ==
Mr. Lee B2C has won different awards in his career. Below are the categories he won.

=== 2017 – Uganda Entertainment Awards ===
- Best music group

=== 2018 – Zzina Awards ===
- Song of the year (Gutamiza) featuring Goodlyfe Crew
- Best Collaboration (Gutamiza)
- Best Afro Beat song (Nyongera)

=== 2021 – Janzi Awards ===
- Outstanding Afro zouk artist of the year

=== 2021 – Hipipo Awards ===
- Best zouk song (Gutujja) ft Rema Namakula
- Best collaboration (Gutujja)

== Personal life ==
Mr. Lee B2C is not in any love relationship with anyone despite rumors of him having a secret relationship which he denies publicly.
