= Lil Jay Bingerack =

Ivorian singer (born 1999)

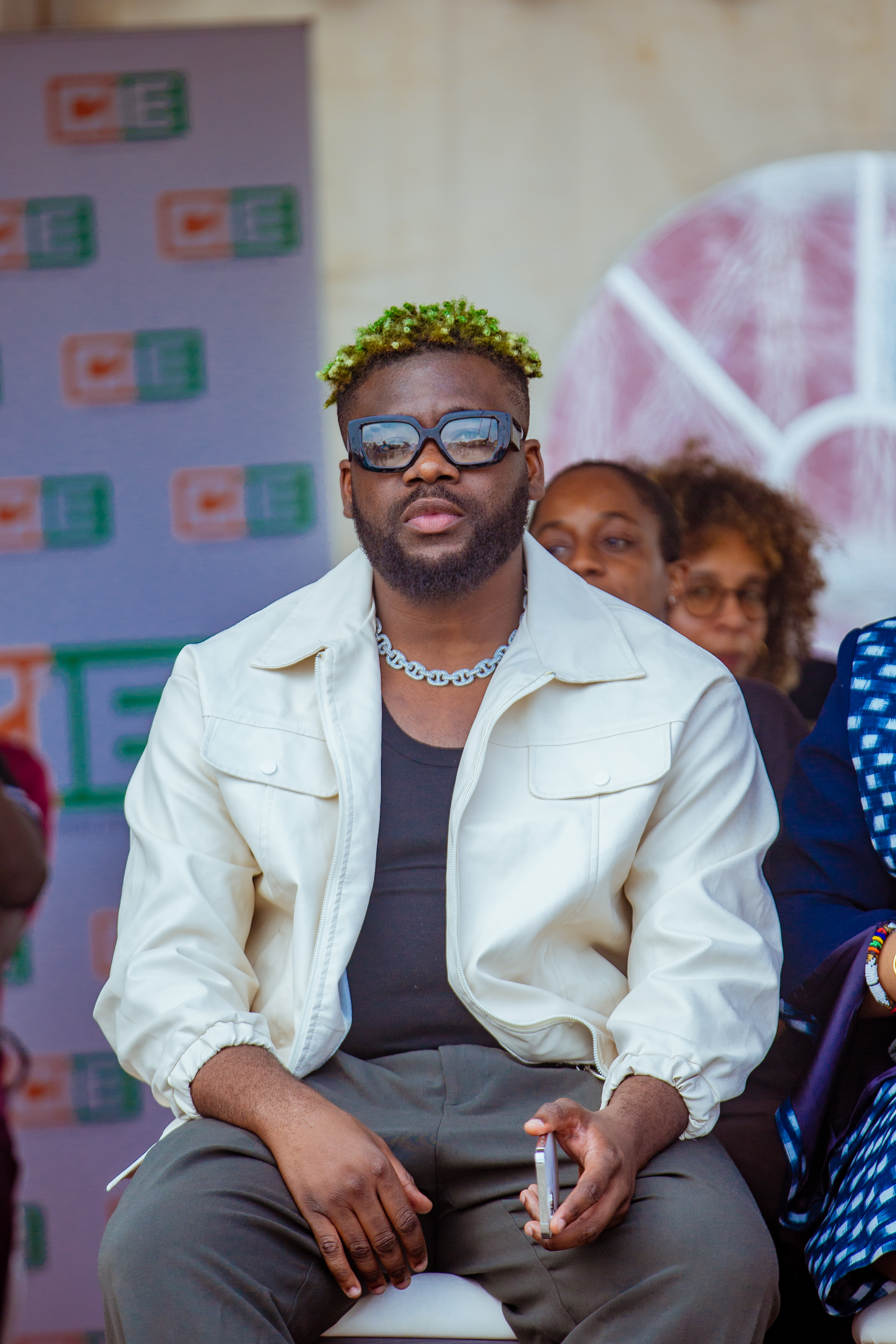

Background information
- Born: Konan Angelo Wilfried
- Genres: Hip-Hop
- Years active: 2016-present
- Label: Black Star France

Lil Jay Bingerack JL Adon 09-Lil Jay.wav, real name Konan Angelo Wilfried (born in Côte d'Ivoire, 17 March 1999) is an Ivorian singer.

== Biography ==
=== Origins ===
Lil Jay Bingerack is from Bingerville. He is of Baoulé origin and is nicknamed "Baoulé son Superstar", His name, Bingerack, refers to the town of Bingerville, the place where he grew up. His brother is El Jay from the group Kif No Beat.

== Career ==
=== Debut ===
In 2018, he released his first album, Apolon, which contains seven tracks. In 2020, he released the single Espoir, which achieved modest success. This track caught the attention of rapper KeBlack, who contacted him for a remix. Despite KeBlack's notoriety, Bingerack's career remained modest and slow to take off.

During the 2023 Africa Cup of Nations in Abidjan, he collaborated with Fior de Bior on the track "Can 2024 chauffez".

== Discography ==
=== Albums ===
- 2024: Mosaic
- 2018: Apolon
