= Soraia Ramos =

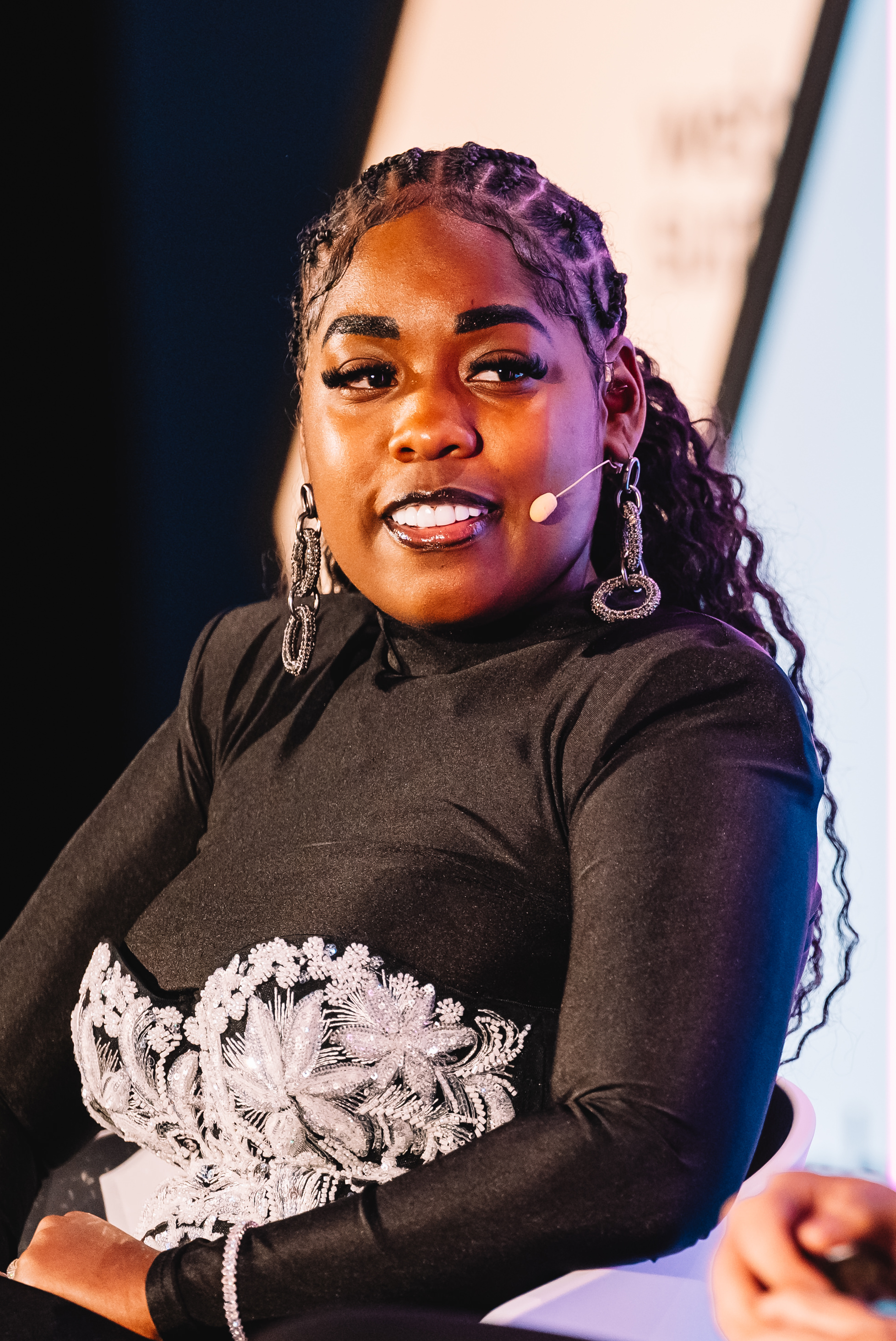
- Ramos in 2023

Background information
- Born: 14 September 1992 (age 33); Portugal
- Occupations: Singer, composer
- Years active: 2014—present

Soraia Ramos (born 14 September 1992) is a singer and composer of Cape-Verdean descent. In 2020, she won the award for Best Female Artist from Central Africa at the 6th edition of the African Muzik Magazine Awards (Afrimma).

== Biography ==
Ramos was born on 14 September 1992 in Portugal, where she lived with her parents in Arrentela, part of the municipality of Seixal, until she was 13. Her younger brother is singer Lisandro Cuxi. She moved to France for a 3-year period, and afterwards, moved to Switzerland. She has expressed an interest in the artistic world since she was young, with the support of her family being essential for her to follow in her musical career; Save for her grandmother, who had emphasized the importance of her studies, saying that "Studying is more important than singing". During this time, she ended her receptionist courses.

Someone who also always believed in her future was her friend Cátia Teixeira that lived in the same building as Soraia, being both her agent and her hairdresser at her first concert at a club in Amora in 2015. Ramos worked at a Subway in Switzerland and on Fridays would go to Portugal to play concerts.

Interviewed by Record Europa on 22 December 2022, Ramos talked about wanting to make her voice arrive to people around the world. She also revealed that the paths to establishing a career in music are not easy, because she began at 8 years old, but only now is able to see the fruit of her work. She mentioned that female empowerment is the principal message that she wishes to display in her music.

In another interview with Jornal Público, Ramos recounted how she had recently visited the Escola Básica da Quinta de São João, her old school in the margem sul of Lisbon. The students identified themselves with her, be it through her origins or through her music. The visit culminated with everyone singing Nosso Amor, a song by Ramos with Calema. Ramos admitted to Público that she privately hoped that the children did not recognize her, as at that age, she only knew Floribella. The visit to her old school and to the neighborhood brought many memories and emotions to both the residents and the singer. Sónia, her 60-year old neighbor, told Público that Soraia made many miss her as she emigrated to France, because she sang to her the songs of Anselmo Ralph, Sara Tavares and Floribella, and her voice touched her heart.

Ramos recognizes the role that legendary singer Cesária Évora had in the expanding of Cape-Verdean music and held her as an example to follow. Ramos intends to spread Cape-Verdean music and culture to the world, not forgetting her roots and language, and for these reasons, she sings primarily in Cape Verdean Creole. With this line of thought, Ramos brought other Portuguese singers of Cape-Verdean background onto her album, including Apollo G in her afro-drill song Muda and Nenny in Nha Terra, filmed in Cabo Verde.

== Work ==
Ramos competed in the Vozes da Diáspora competition, earning 4th place. She released the EP Um pouco de mim, seguido por Diz-me in 2014. In 2017, she signed with the producer Klasszik, the motive for her returning to Portugal. With the producer, she released the songs Bai and O nosso amor, with the participation of Calema. This last song hit more than 37 million views in a span of two years. However, she had various requests denied by the director of the producer. Afterwards, she released Bai - Remix with the participation of her brother Lisandro, who lives in France.

She formed a partnership with the Angolan singer C4 Pedro, and together they released the song Bo tem mel no palco Zénith, em Paris, para mais de mil pessoas, which became the most listened song for the month in Portugal and Luxembourg. She had other partnerships such as NGA, Monsta, DREEZY, among others.

In 2011, her collaboration with Calema, Pérola, and Manecas Costa, Kua Buaru, was nominated at the All Africa Music Awards 2021 for both Best African Collaboration and for Best African Group, Duo or Band. They were also nominated by the 8th African Muzik Magazine Awards for Song of the Year.

Ramos was part of the lineup for the Festival Zambujeira do Mar, in 2022 on their secondary stage and in the 2023 edition on their main stage.

In 2023, she released the song Buka Bali Nada, inspired by her experience with toxic relationships. The video reached more than 15 million views on YouTube, having trended on the platform and on social media for many weeks.

In October 2023, Ramos launched her debut album, titled Cocktail, which, according to Ramos, was an unending and incomplete album. It is made up of 15 tracks, including various styles of music, including "r&b, pop, rap, trap, kizomba, funaná, afrobeat, drill, and even sertanejo".

From Arrentela, where she was raised by her grandparents, Ramos has played a major role in the dissemination of Cape-Verdean culture. She told Público in an interview that she was going to Arrentela at least one time a month to visit her grandparents, and despite having been able to follow her dreams, she does not consider herself above the neighborhood or the people who live there. She is just an incentive for the youth there to not give up on their dreams, despite the barriers that they face in reaching those dreams. She ends by saying that "it's not because the neighborhood is less". According to the members of Calema, she is "today a model and an inspiration, above all for African and Afro-descendent women".

In the Cape-Verdean artistic world, Ramos is an artist with international visibility. She is a recognizable name in the Portuguese-speaking world, according to Público, having performed in Cape Verde, Mozambique, Angola, Guinea-Bissau, the United States, France, Switzerland, the Netherlands, and Luxembourg.

Ramos has also won the Best Female Artist in Central Africa award at the 6th edition of the African Muzik Magazine Awards (Afrimma) in 2020. That same year, she was nominated for four categories for the MTV Music Awards 2020: Best Female Africa, Best Lusophone, Best Female Central Africa and Best Collaboration. In 2021, she was nominated for the African Muzik Magazine Awards for Best African Female, Best Lusophone and Best Collaboration. She also performed at the MTV Africa Music Awards 2021 in Kampala, Uganda, where she was nominated for Best Female Act and Best Lusophone Act.

She was chosen at the end of 2021 to be the cover of the EQUAL playlist on Spotify, the biggest female-only playlist in the world, which led to her face being shown on advertisements at Times Square in New York. She was also on the cover of Africa playlist on Apple Music in 2022, becoming the first artist from the Portuguese-speaking world to do so.

On 27 October 2023, Ramos released the album Cocktail. The album was given that name for the mixture of various genres. The album did not have any rules, and the results came in small moments that consolidated together. This was the result of the hard work that Ramos put in, sometimes recording in pajamas at her studio, said her producer Nelson de Sousa, who further described her as open to new experiences and ready to work at any time at night or day. Cocktail "is a constellation of Soraias", Ramos said, due to the various sounds, themes, messages, and feelings; Among them, she said, was the headaches that men have given her.

The same month, Ramos performed at Festival Imminente at the Terreiro do Paço in Lisbon to a large audience. Performances of her first new album debuted on 30 March 2024 at the Coliseu, and the album has gained more than 30 million streams since its launch. Ramos was invited to participate at the Web Summit 2024 in Rio de Janeiro.

== Discography ==
- Cocktail (2023)
