= Betty G =

Ethiopian singer-songwriter

Betty G ቤቲ ጂ
- Birth name: Bruktawit Getahun
- Genres: Ethiopian music; pop; soft rock
- Occupations: Singer; songwriter
- Instruments: Vocals
- Years active: 2012–present
- Labels: MondoTunes; Yisakal Entertainment

Bruktawit Getahun (Amharic: ብሩክታዊት ጌታሁን), better known by her stage name Betty G, is an Ethiopian singer and songwriter.

She initiated her career by collaborating with various artists, most notably, hip hop musician, like Nhatty Man, Henok Mehari, Jonny Ragga, and Henok Abebe. Her 2015 debut album Manew Fitsum and 2018 album Wegegta have been best selling album during 2016 and 2018.

== Life and career ==
Bruktwait Getahun was born and raised in Addis Ababa, Ethiopia. She attended Lycée Guebre-Mariam, a French high school. She later joined the Commercial College of Addis Ababa and a French University, Universite de L"IAE Politier, via correspondence, graduating in 2009 with a dual degree in Office Management and General Management. With a music career starting humbly during her high school days, Betty G's stature has today seen her collaborate with several prominent Ethiopian artists including Teddy Afro, Zeritu Kebede, Jhonny Raga and Natnael Ayalew (Nhatty Man). On Coke Studio Africa 2017, Betty G collaborated with Cameroonian music group: X-Maleya as produced by Nigeria’s Chopstix. She sings in French, English and Amharic.

Bruktawit released her debut studio album entitled Manew Fitsum in 2015.

In 2018, Getahun released her critically acclaimed second album entitled Wegegta which earned her 6 AFRIMA nominations. The album was produced by Yamlu Molla who was also nominated for an AFRIMA Award.

She has noted that she does experiment with other genres of music such as jazz, rock, and electronic.

Betty G is a UNHCR high-profile supporter and has visited refugee camps within Ethiopia advocating for refugee' rights, particularly women refugees' rights.

Betty G was inducted for Nobel Peace Prize 2019, an award of Prime Minister Abiy Ahmed and sung two songs "Hagere" and "Sin Jalleda".

== Discography ==
Studio albums

- Manew Fitsum (2015)
- Wegegta (2018)

=== Singles ===
- "Addis Semay" (2021)
- "Gereye" (2018)

== Awards and nominations ==
Year	Awards	Nominee	Result
2018	All Africa Music Awards	Artist of the Year	Nominated
2018	All Africa Music Awards	Best Female Artist in Eastern Africa	Won
2018	All Africa Music Awards	Best Artist Duo in African Jazz	Nominated
2018	All Africa Music Awards	Best Artist Group in African Rock	Nominated
2018	All Africa Music Awards	Revelation of the Year	Won
2022	All Africa Music Awards	Best Female Artist in Eastern Africa	Nominated
2022	All Africa Music Awards	Best Duo in African Traditional	Nominated
2023	All Africa Music Awards	Best Female Artist in Eastern Africa	Nominated
2023	All Africa Music Awards	Best Duo in African Traditional	Nominated
