= B2C Entertainment =

Ugandan music group

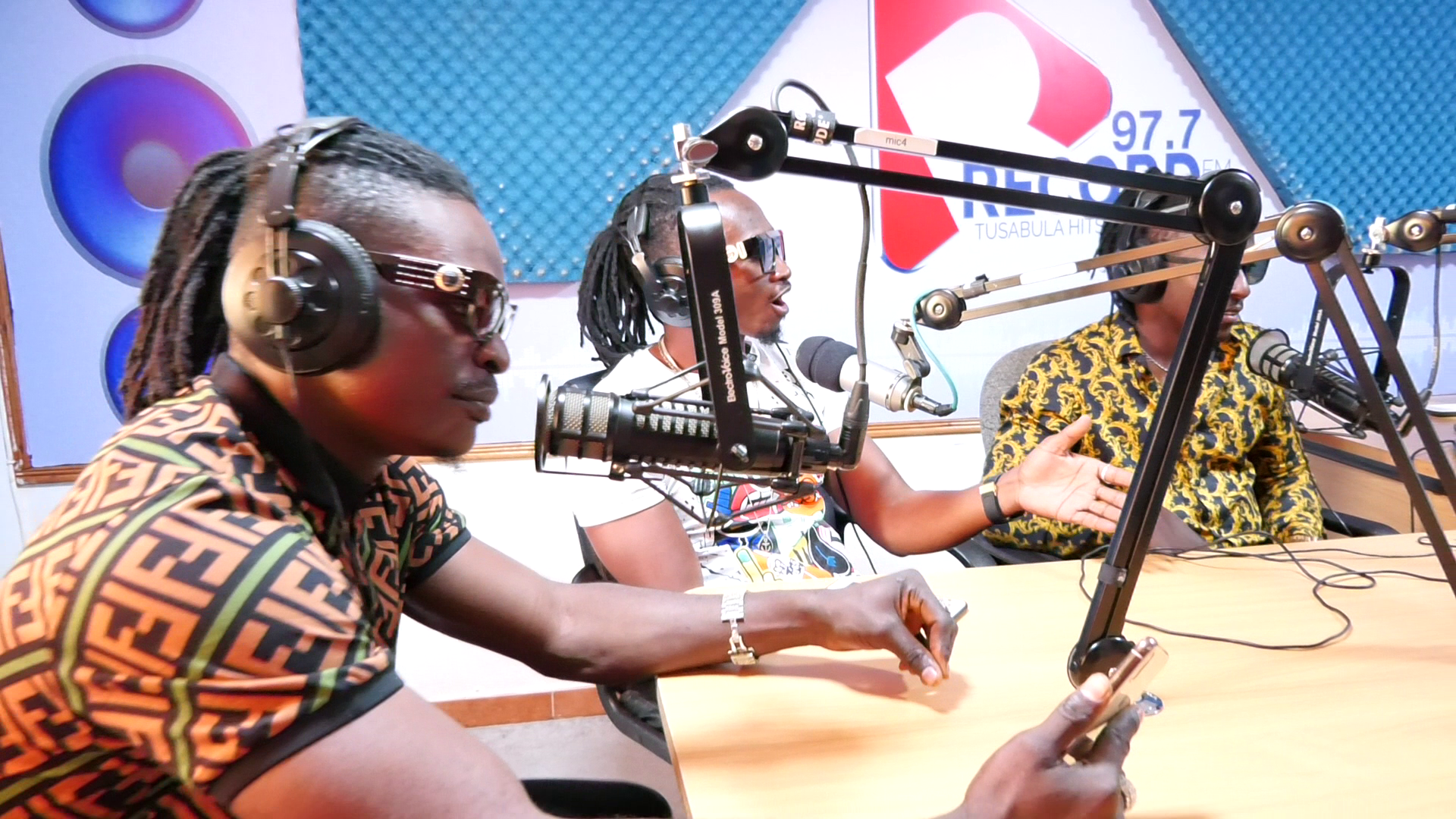

Background information
- Also known as: Kampala Boys
- Origin: Uganda
- Genres: Afro Beat
- Occupation: Musician
- Years active: 2016–present
- Members: Delivad Julio; Mr. Lee B2C; Bobby Lash B2C

Born To Conquer (B2C) Entertainment, also known as Kampala Boys, is a Ugandan music group of three musicians who sing together. B2C is made of [Delivad Julio] (born Kasagga Julius), [Mr. Lee B2C] (born Mugisha Richard) and [Bobby Lash B2C] (born Ssali Peterson). Delivad Julio and Mr. Lee sing with soothing soft RnB vocals while Bobby Lash B2C sings the Ragga and dancehall vibes. The three formed B2C entertainment from school as they were students at Crested secondary school in Makindye Division in Kampala. Because of their consistency, the trio decided to start professional music in 2016 with their breakthrough song known as Tokigeza produced by Diggy Baur.

== Collaborations ==
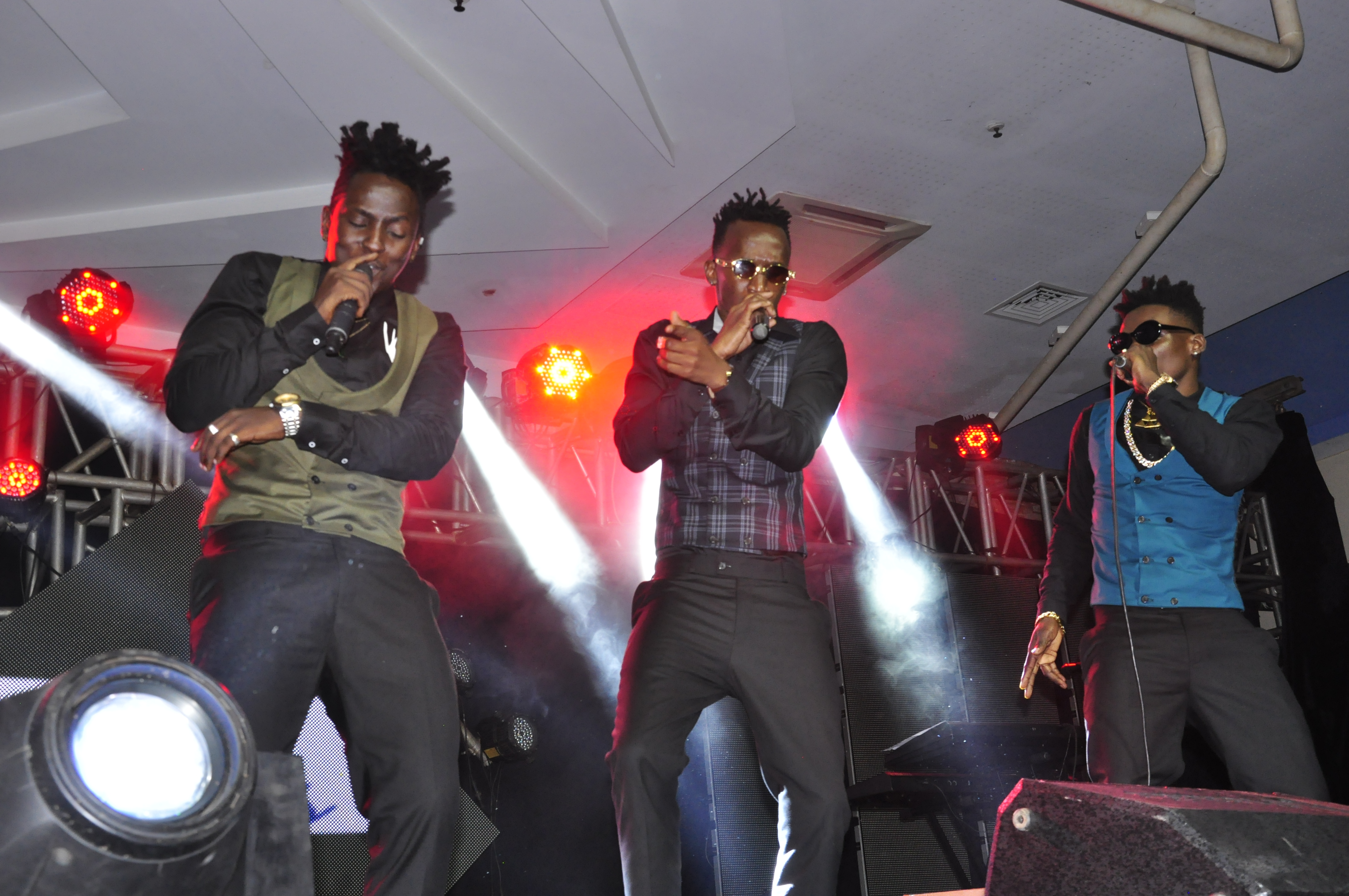
B2C performing

In 2017, B2C Entertainment released a collaboration with Spice Diana, a Ugandan popular musician which increased their fanbase on the local market. Still in the same year, the trio released another music collaboration with Goodlyfe Crew titled Gutamiza which performed well in their career. Gutamiza won different awards which helped B2C penetrate to the lists of top artistes on Ugandan music charts.

In 2017, B2C released a music collaboration titled Kapande with one of the most popular Ugandan musicians known as Eddy Kenzo. In 2018, the trio produced a song with The Ben a popular singer from Rwanda.

In 2018, B2C Entertainment ended their working contract with their brand manager Andrew Mugerwa known as "Andy Events" who claimed to have started the B2C entertainment as a musical group. The music trio claimed Andy events had different dreams and ambitions which could not match their desires.

In 2019, B2C entertainment released another collaboration with one of Uganda's best female vocalists Rema Namakula titled Gutujja produced by Nessim.

In 2023, the trio has released two collaborations which have performed well, they released a song with Ugandan singer Carol Nantongo titled Ndabula and later released another music collaboration with Fik Fameica titled Crazy Company.

== Awards and nominations ==
B2C AWARDS AND NOMINATIONS LIST
Year	Awards	Category	Result
2023	Zzina Awards	Contemporary Artiste of the year; Male Artiste of the year; Artiste of the year	Nominated
2022	ASFA Awards	Most stylish male artiste of the year	Nominated
2021	Afrima Awards	Best African Duo, Group or Band	Nominated
2021	Hipipo Awards	Best zouk song (Gutujja by B2C ft Rema Namakula); Best collaboration (Gutujja)	Won
2021	Janzi Awards	Outstanding Afro-zouk artiste; Outstanding Entrepreneurial artist	Won; Nominated
2020	MTV Mama Awards	Song of the year (Munda Awo)	Nominated
2019	Afrima Awards	Best African Duo, Group or Band	Nominated
2018	Zzina Awards	Song of the year (Gutamiza); Best Afro-beat song (Nyongera); Best Collaboration(Gutamiza)	Won
2017	Uganda Entertainment Awards	Best music group	Won

== Concerts ==
In 2018, B2C Entertainment (Kampala Boys) held their first concert at Freedom City Mall along Entebbe road in Namasuba.

In 2022, the music trio had their second career concert at Freedom City mall. B2C have then announced their third concert dates scheduled for 2024 at hotel Africana in Kampala.
