= Aaron Rimbui =

Kenyan pianist, keyboardist, bandleader, producer, festival curator and radio host

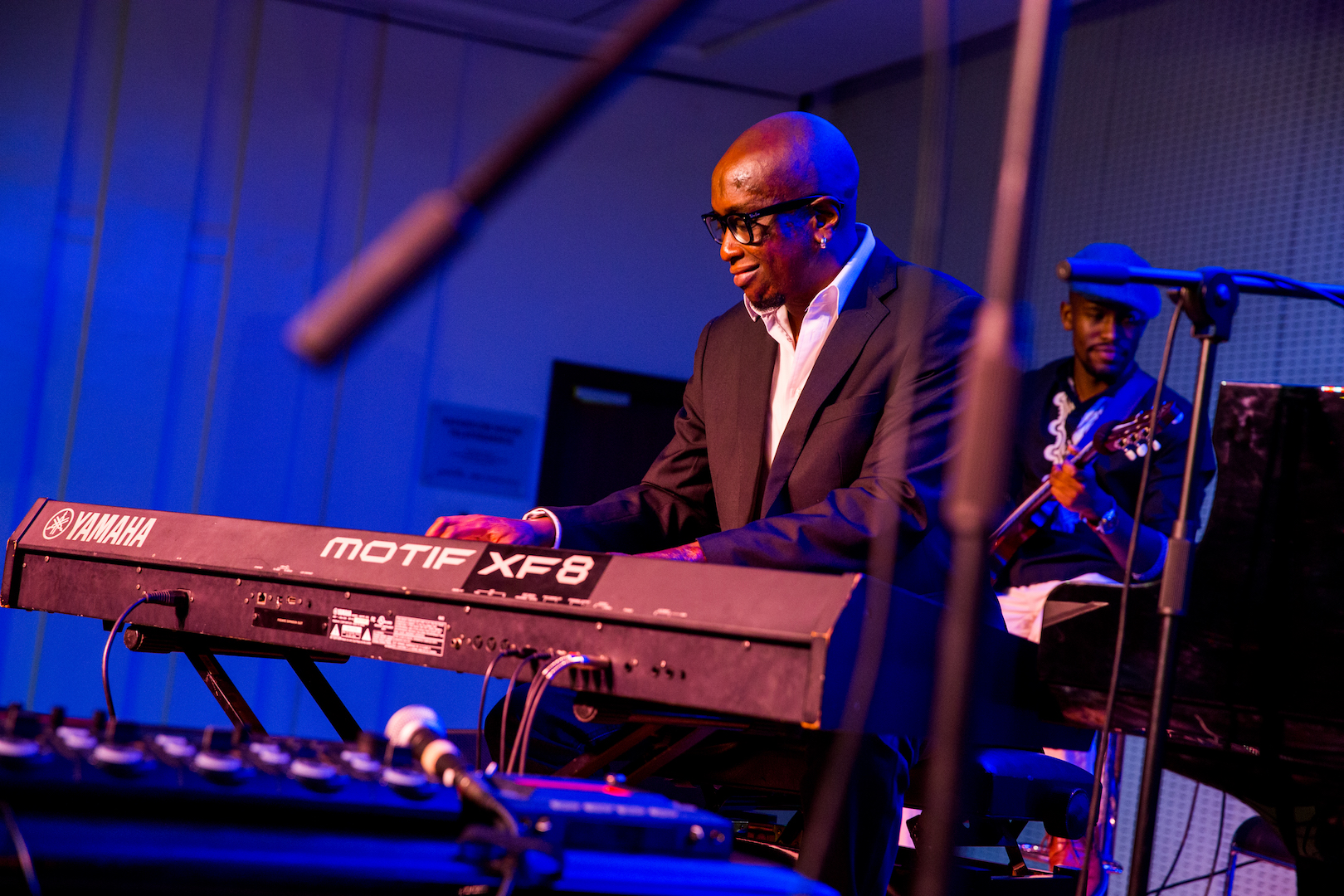
- Rimbui in February 2016

Background information
- Born: Harun Kimathi Rimbui; October 15, 1979 (age 46); Nairobi, Kenya
- Genres: Jazz, World Music, fusion, post-bop
- Occupations: Musician, composer, bandleader, record producer, arranger, drummer
- Instruments: Piano, electric piano, keyboards, synthesizers, workstation synthesizers, drums, percussion
- Years active: 2001-present
- Label: Independent,
- Website: www.aaronrimbui.com

Harun "Aaron" Kimathi Rimbui is a Kenyan pianist, keyboardist, bandleader, producer, festival curator and radio host. He is regarded as one of East Africa's finest pianists.

== Biography ==
Aaron was born in Nairobi, Kenya. His father would play music ranging from Stevie Wonder records to Henry Mancini and take him to local restaurants where he heard the music of groups like Les Wanyika, Maroon Commandos and Samba Mapangala. This had a significant influence on how he developed his sound in later years. Rimbui's individual expression in music continued to form in his high school years. It is at this time that he picked up the piano. Rimbui began to gravitate toward jazz as he listened to the music of David Sanborn, Joe Sample, Yellowjackets and Fourplay and later, Herbie Hancock and George Duke. Rimbui served as head of the Tusker Project Fame band.

== Professional career ==
Rimbui started his career as music director playing for Eric Wainaina He then recorded his first album Keys Of Life. Rimbui then began his festival outings with Jahazi Jazz Festival and later Dar Jazz Event Rimbui recorded his sophomore record Alfajiri Rimbui continued his festival performances at Safaricom Jazz Festival and Winter Jazz Festival Copenhagen In 2016, Rimbui released his third record Deeper. Rimbui also began a series of concerts titled All That Jazz. Rimbui with Eric Wainaina composed the theme music and score for the television series Tinga Tinga Tales.

== Discography ==
- 2016 Deeper
- 2017 Kwetu
- 2024 Imani
