= Iba One =

Malian rapper and producer (born 1989)

- Born: Ibrahim Mahamadou Fily Sissoko; 22 March 1989 (age 37); Bamako, Mali
- Genres: Hip hop; Afropop; Conscious rap
- Occupations: Rapper; Singer; Songwriter; Record producer
- Years active: 2010–present
- Label: Team Gladia Productions

Ibrahim Mahamadou Fily Sissoko (born on March 22, 1989), better known by his stage name Iba One, is a Malian rapper, songwriter and record producer. Recognized as one of West Africa's most prominent hip-hop artists, he is known for his versatile style encompassing hip-hop, Afropop, and conscious rap.

Iba holds the Guinness World Record for the most wins at a single All Africa Music Awards (AFRIMA) ceremony, having won five awards on 21 November 2021. This historic achievement included the Continental awards for Album of the Year (Mon Empire), Songwriter of the Year, Best African Pop, and Best Inspirational Music – Male Artist, in addition to the Regional award for Best Male Artist – West Africa. He also earned the title of "Best Artist of West Africa" at the 2021 PRIMUD (Prix International de la Musique Urbaine et du Coupé Décalé).

His critically acclaimed double album, Mon Empire (2020), which draws inspiration from the historic Mali Empire, earned him several major awards and made him among the leading voices in African music. Beyond his musical career, Iba is also a noted philanthropist, focusing on supporting orphans and underserved communities. He founded the multiservice company and record label Team Gladia, aiming to nurture the next generation of Malian artists.

== Biography ==
Iba One was born in 1989, in Bamako, Mali.

== Career ==
He rose to fame in rap in 2010, a year in which he received several awards. In 2013, he won best "Dirty Freestyle" in Côte d'Ivoire.

In 2016, at the Tamani d'Or International Music Festival, Iba One received the title of Best Rapper of the Year and was named Rap Revelation of the Year at the African Moove Awards.

In 2021, he won five trophies at the All Africa Music Awards in Nigeria in the following categories: Best Male Artist in Western Africa, Album of the Year, Best African Pop Duo or Group, Best Male African Artist in Inspirational Music, and Songwriter of the Year.

== Philanthropy ==
Iba is also a philanthropist. He primarily helps orphans and the most disadvantaged. He has donated food to children of soldiers who died for the country and to several orphanages. At the beginning of the Coronavirus pandemic, he distributed masks and sanitizer to talibés (Qur'anic students) on the streets and in markets.

== Personal life ==
Iba is married and has one son. On September 30, 2021, Iba lost his mother, Oumou Dily Camara, whom he often mentioned in his songs. She was buried in Médina Coura.

== Discography ==
=== Albums ===
- 2010: The First
- 2013: Dondo Temena, by Iba One
- 2013: Rap Champion
- 2020: Mon Empire Vol.1
- 2020: Mon Empire Vol.2

The album title "Mon Empire" refers to the reign of Emperor Mansa Musa in the 14th century, who brought the Mali Empire to its peak. Gold mining allowed Mansa Musa to accumulate considerable wealth and ensure the prosperity of his kingdom. He is a source of inspiration for the artist in this double album.

The album consists of 34 tracks. The songs cover various themes: education, the fight against prostitution, the plight of street children, love, conscious Rap; Iba One also engages in "egotrip" (like many rappers, he promotes himself) and "clash" (in rap, attacking someone, often another rapper).

The album earned Iba One several awards in various African countries.

== Awards and nominations ==
Iba has received numerous awards throughout his career.

Awards and nominations
Year	Category	Award	Result
2010	Best Rapper of the Year	Mali Hiphop Awards (Mali)	Won
2010	Best Song of the Year (alhadoulilaye)	Mali HipHop Awards 2010 (Mali)	Won
2010	GRR Best Group of the Year	Mali HipHop Awards (Mali)	Won
2010	Best Rapper of Mali	Tamani d'Or (Mali)	Won
2013	Best Rapper in Dirty Rap Diaspora	Dirty Rap (Côte d'Ivoire)	Won
2015	Best Rapper of the Year	Tamani d'Or (Mali)	Won
2015	Among the 21 Most Influential Youths of Mali	Magazine Kewale People (Mali)	Won
2015	Most Influential Rapper of Mali	Magazine Kewale People (Mali)	Won
2015	Dokera Best HipHop Video of the Year (Music video)	WATSUP TV AFRICA (Ghana)	Won
2016	Best Collaboration of the Year (Akouma te kai feat Sidiki Diabaté)	Mali HipHop Awards (Mali)	Won
2016	Most Influential Rapper of Mali	Magazine Kewale People (Mali)	Won
2016	Among the 21 Most Influential Youths of Mali	Magazine Kewale People (Mali)	Won
2016	Best Rap Revelation of the Year	Africamoove (France)	Won
2017	Best African Rapper of the Year	Festi Simandou (Guinea)	Won
2017	Best Rapper of Mali	Tamani d'Or (Mali)	Won
2017	Best Male Artist of the Year	Tamani d'Or (Mali)	Won
2017	Most Influential Rapper of Mali	Magazine Kewale People (Mali)	Won
2017	Among the 21 Most Influential Youths of Mali	Magazine Kewale People (Mali)	Won
2018	Best Ambassador of Malian Music	Nuit des stars (Mali)	Won
2018	Among the 21 Most Influential Youths of Mali	Kewale People magazine (Mali)	Won
2019	Most Influential Artist of Mali	Magazine Kewale People (Mali)	Won
2019	Among the 21 Most Influential Youths of Mali	Magazine Kewale People (Mali)	Won
2019	Best Rapper of the Year	Nuit des stars (Mali)	Won
2019	Best Ambassador of Malian Music	Nuit des stars (Mali)	Won
2019	Best Rapper of the Year	Mali Awards (Mali)	Won
2020	Most Influential Artist of the Year	Magazine Kewale People (Mali)	Won
2020	Voted Among the 21 Most Influential Youths of Mali	Magazine Kewale People (Mali)	Won
2020	Best Ambassador of Malian Rap	Nuit des stars (Mali)	Won
2020	Best Urban Singer	Nuit des Stars (Mali)	Won
2020	Best Rapper of the Year	Nuit des Stars (Mali)	Won
2020	Honorary Trophy for Courage Towards His Mother	Groupe Mande Massa (Mali)	Won
2020	Best Artist of Francophone West Africa	Primud d'or (Côte d'Ivoire)	Won
2020	Best Artist of West Africa	African Awards Talents (Côte d'Ivoire)	Won
2021	Best Francophone West African Artist of the Year	Primud d'or (Côte d'Ivoire)	Won
2021	Best Album of the Year - Mon Empire	All Africa Music Awards (AFRIMA) (Nigeria)	Won
2021	Best Male Inspirational Artist of the Year - Éducation feat Oumou Sangaré	All Africa Music Awards (AFRIMA) (Nigeria)	Won
2021	Best Songwriter of the Year - Éducation feat Oumou Sangaré	All Africa Music Awards (AFRIMA) (Nigeria)	Won
2021	Best Artist West Africa	KUNDE D’or (Burkina Faso)	Nominated
2021	Best Artist West Africa	Bénin Showbiz Awards (Bénin)	Won
2021	Most Influential African Artist of the Year	Bénin Showbiz Awards (Bénin)	Won
2021	Best African Rapper 2021	African Talent Awards (Côte d'Ivoire)	Won
2021	Best Album of the Year 2021	African Talent Awards (Côte d'Ivoire)	Won
2021	Best African Artist of the Year	Galsen hip-hop Awards (Senegal)	Won
2021	(Mon Empire) Best African Album of the Year	Galsen hip-hop Awards (Senegal)	Won
2021	Best Artist of the Year	NekaMag (Mali)	Won
2021	Best Album of the Year	Renouveau foly award (Mali)	Won
2021	Best Rap Album of the Year	Renouveau foly award (Mali)	Won
