= Elow'n =

Ivorian singer-songwriter

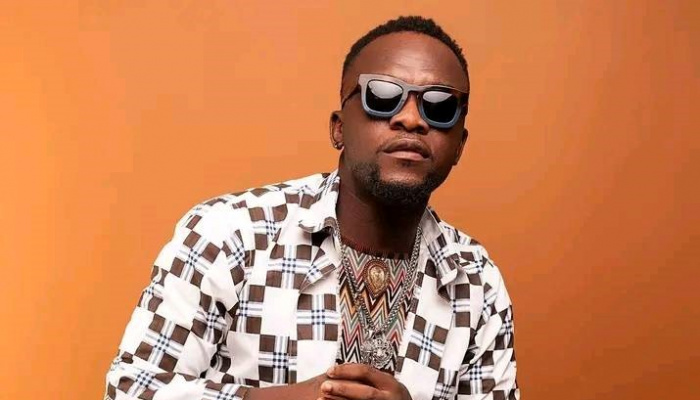

Background information
- Born: Brice N'wole; December 5, 1990 (age 35); Zokrodépié, Ivory Coast
- Genres: Hip hop
- Occupations: Rapper; singer; songwriter; producer
- Instrument: Voice
- Label: Independent

Brice N'WOLE, professionally known as ELOW'N, is an Ivorian rapper, singer, songwriter and producer. He was born on December 15, 1990, in Ivory Coast. Elow'n is one of the leaders of a new wave of the Ivorian rap scene, better known as "Rap Ivoire".

== Life and career ==
Brice N'wole was born in Zokrodépié, the sub-prefecture of Issia in the western part of Ivory Coast. During his childhood, he spent his school holidays in the pan-African village KI-YI in Abidjan with his uncle Boni Gnahoré, another Ivorian musician.

In 2009, he made his music debut as a member of the rap group KIFF NO BEAT.

Each year since 2021, he has organized his festival in his hometown of Aboisso, named La Bia Festival. More than 6000 people attended the first event.

== Personal life ==
Since 2019, he has been married to Maeva Samira, also known as Small Madame.

== Awards ==
Year	Competition	Prize/ Award
2020	African Talent Award	Best rapper
2021	African Talent Award	Best rapper
2021	AFRIMA	Award for Best African rapper or lyricist
2022	Point Blank Prod	Meilleur Album Africain
