= Janet Otieno =

Kenyan Gospel Singer

- Born: Janet Achieng Otieno; 24 December 1977 (age 48); Kisumu, Kenya
- Genres: Gospel
- Occupation: Singer-songwriter,
- Instrument: Vocals
- Years active: 2013–present
- Website: janetotieno.co.ke

Janet Achieng Otieno (born 24 December 1977) is a singer and songwriter of gospel music from Kenya. She was the winner of Mwafaka Awards and nominated at Groove Awards for "Collaboration of the year" in 2014 for the song "Napokea Kwako" which featured Christina Shusho from Tanzania.

== Early life and career ==
Janet gained interest in music in 2010 when she started singing in church. She later released her first song, "Napokea Kwako", which featured Tanzanian gospel singer Christina Shusho, in 2013. The song gained her much attention and fame and in 2014, she was awarded for "Collaboration of the year for the song "Napokea Kwako" by Mwafaka Awards. She later released other songs such as Mtafute, Ni Wewe, Nijaze, Nitangoja, Tulia, Amka Ucheze, More of you, Heshima and Uniongoze. In 2014 she was nominated for Female artist of the year, Collaboration of the year and Song of the year by Groove Awards and in 2018 she was nominated as the Best Female Artiste in African Inspirational Music at Afrima Awards.

== Discography ==
=== Singles ===
- Napokea Kwako Featuring Christina Shusho (2013)
- Uniongoze (2013)
- Heshima (2014)
- Ni wewe (2014)
- Mtafute (2014)
- Tembea Nami (2015)
- Nisamehe (2015)
- Roho Wako (2015)
- Nifunze (2016)
- More Of You (2016)
- Roho Mtakatifu (2016)
- Bisha (2017)
- Shuka (2017)
- Narudi (2018)
- Asante (2018)
- Pokea (2019)
- Nijaze (2020)
- Nitangoja(2020)
- Unconditional Love (2021)

== Awards and nominations ==
| Year | Award Ceremony | Prize | Result |
|---|---|---|---|
| 2014 | Mwafaka Awards | Collabo of the Year | Won |
| 2014 | Groove Awards | Female Artist Of the Year | Nominated |
| 2014 | Groove Awards | Collabo of the Year | Nominated |
| 2014 | Groove Awards | Video of the Year | Nominated |
| 2018 | Afrima Awards | Best Female Artiste in African Inspirational Music | Nominated |

== Personal life ==
Janet Otieno is the second born in a family of six children. She is married to Alfred Otieno whom she met while singing in redeemed gospel church; the couple married in 1996.
