= Cleo Ice Queen =

Zambian singer

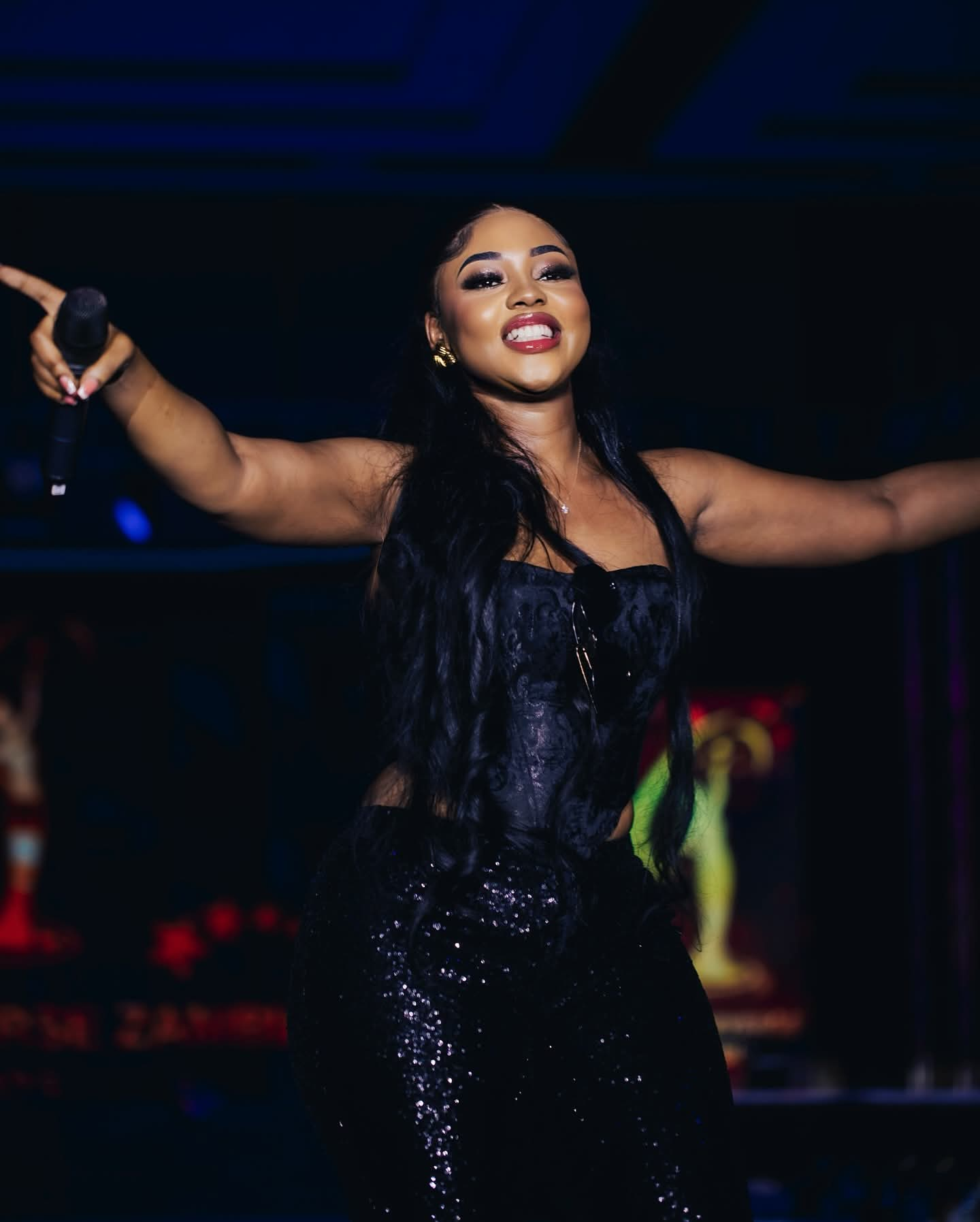
- Born: Clementina Mulenga; 14 June 1989 (age 37); Lusaka, Zambia
- Other name: Cleo Ice Queen
- Occupations: Rapper; Singer; Songwriter; Model; Entrepreneur
- Spouse: Kalale Masengu (m. 2019)
- Musical career
- Genres: Hip hop; Afro pop; Dancehall
- Instrument: Vocals
- Years active: 2011–present
- Label: Def Jam

Clementina Mulenga Masengu (born 14 June 1989), popularly known as Cleo Ice Queen, is a Zambian musician and television personality. To her music career, she has two successful albums and affiliations with international labels such as Def Jam Records, Cleo has earned numerous accolades, including the Best Female Rapper Southern Africa at the 2021 African Muzik Magazine Awards (AFRIMMA) and Best Female Artiste Southern Africa at the 2022 All Africa Music Awards (Afrima).

== Early life and career ==
Born on June 14, 1989, Cleo grew up in a family of five with two brothers and two sisters. Her passion for hip hop music started at the young age of six, and by the time she was 11 years old, she had already begun her music career. Cleo's interest in the entertainment industry was evident from a very young age, as she used to perform at her own parties starting from her fourth birthday.

At Banani International School, where the principal had built a recording studio, Cleo had her first studio experience. At the age of 16, she recorded and released her first single "Hands Up."

Cleo's moniker "Ice Queen" originates from her love for jewellery, which is commonly referred to as "ice" in hip hop slang. In addition to her musical and brand ambassador work, Cleo has been featured in various publications. She was the cover story for the March 2014 issue of the Nigerian magazine VL! Magazine.

Engaging in humanitarian work, she served as a Global Citizen Ambassador, contributing to initiatives aimed at ending extreme poverty. Cleo is currently a Softcare ambassador, endorsing affordable and comfortable baby and women’s essentials. Her partnerships reflect her selfless commitment to assisting underprivileged individuals, guided by the motto, "To whom much is given, much is required." Cleo Ice Queen continues to break barriers in the entertainment industry, promising more success with each project. She is currently working on her third studio album.

Beyond her musical pursuits, she holds a certificate in Digital Marketing from the University of Zambia (UNZA) and currently pursuing a Marketing Degree at the University of Lusaka (UNILUS).

== Professional music ==
In 2011, Cleo started her music career, and the following year, she released a single titled "Big Dreams," featuring JK, which became a nationwide hit. She was also featured in the official remix of Khuli Chana's "Tswa Daar" song, which featured other popular African artists like Ice Prince, Maggz, Navio, AKA, and Reason. Cleo's debut album, "Geminice," was released in December 2016. The album has 14 songs, and the theme is inspired by her Gemini star sign. One part of the album comprises seven sentimental and lyrical songs, while the other seven songs are fun-loving and upbeat, including party anthems like the Urban Hype-featured "Turn Up," "Addicted," and "Autobahn."

In December 2016, Cleo released another single titled "Soldier," produced by Kekero. On September 22, 2016, Cleo was the first Zambian artist to be selected for Season 2 of Coke Studio, a popular music television series in Africa. Together with Bucie and Mr Kamera, she created the song "Simunye" ("We are one"), which was a massive hit. The song celebrates African unity and oneness with a mix of Cleo's native tongue, Nyanja, and South African native tongue, Xhosa. It showcases how music has no language barriers.

== Television ==
In 2013 Mulenga gained national recognition as a participant in the eighth season of the reality television series Big Brother Africa, which was produced by Endemol for M-Net. The show, which began on 26 May 2013, ran for 91 days and concluded on 25 August 2013. Mulenga spent the entirety of the season in the Big Brother house and emerged as the runner-up to Dillish Mathews, who won the 2013 season.

In 2015, Mulenga was chosen to host Bola Yapa Zed, a SuperSport football magazine show that exclusively focuses on Zambian football. The show is dedicated to bringing fans up-to-date information on all aspects of Zambian football, including news, interviews, and highlights. As the presenter of Bola Yapa Zed, Mulenga has become a well-known figure in the Zambian sports community.

=== Coke Studio ===
On 22 September 2016, Cleo made history as the first Zambian artist to participate in Season 2 of Coke Studio, a popular music television series in Africa that gives artists the opportunity to create new and innovative music. Cleo, also known as the "lady of rap," collaborated with Bucie, the "lady of house music," as well as super producer Mr Kamera, singer-songwriter Les-Ego, and master sound engineer Wilson. Together, they created the chart-topping hit, "Simunye" ("We are one"), which celebrates African royalty, unity, and oneness. The song features elements of Cleo's native Zambian language, Nyanja, as well as South African native tongue, Xhosa, and demonstrates the universality of music by transcending language barriers.

Introducing Coke Studio at a glittering preview event in Lusaka, Cleo said: "Making music is an amazing journey, and Coke Studio really shows the talent, effort and fun that artists put into their craft. I’m just so pleased that Zambian music fans can now have a chance to share that passion on QTV."

— Cleo speaking in an interview.

=== African Hip-Hop Awards ===
On 21 May 2017 Cleo was a special guest at the official launch of the African Hip Hop Awards 1 July at Chez Intemba in Lusaka.

== Personal life ==
=== Relationships ===
Cleo is also known as Mrs Masengu, as she is married to Kaladoshas, and the couple has three children.

== Awards and nominations ==
Year	Award	Category	Result
2012	South African Hip Hop Awards	Best Female	Nominated
2013	Born & Bred Awards	Best Female Up coming	Nominated
2014	Zambian Music Awards	Best New Artist	Nominated
2015	African Muzik Magazine Awards	Best Female Southern Africa	Won
2016	African Muzik Magazine Awards	Best Female Southern Africa	Nominated
2016	Zambian Music Awards	Best Female	Nominated
2017	African Muzik Magazine Awards	Best Female Southern Africa	Nominated
2017	Zambia Kwacha Music Awards	Best Female Artist	Won
2019	Zambia Kwacha Music Awards	Best Female	Won
2021	African Muzik Magazine Awards	Best Female Southern Africa	Won
2023	African Entertainment Award USA	Best Female Africa	Won
