= Fior de Bior =

Nigerian-Ivorian rapper (born 1998)

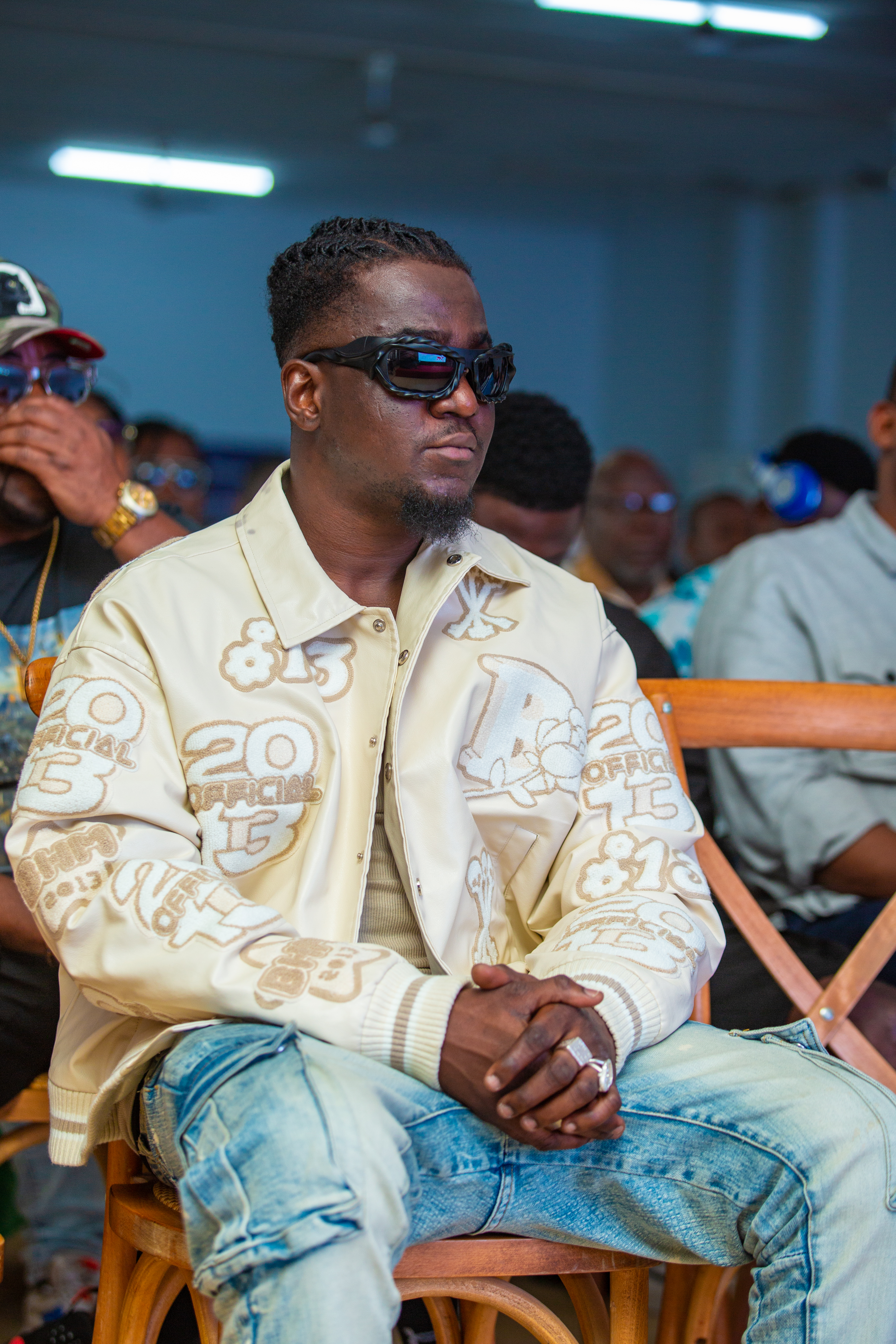

Background information
- Born: April 14, 1998 (age 28); Nigeria
- Genres: Rap
- Occupation: Rapper
- Years active: 2018-present
- Label: F2B Prod

Fior de Bior, also styled Fior2Bior (real name Ali Aké), is a Nigerian-Ivorian rapper, born April 14, 1998 (age 28) in Nigéria. He is best known for the rather enigmatic persona he has cultivated on social media in recent years, but also for his hit song Gnonmi avec lait in collaboration with French rapper Niska,.

== Biography ==
In 2021, he released the track Gnonmi avec lait featuring Niska which quickly went viral, achieving 3 million views after just 3 days.

- 2019 Kpokpopkouo Souhalele
- 2020: Chikita (feat. J Haine)
- 2020: Boda (feat. Fireman)
- 2020: Piqué Piqué (feat. Oyoki Onanayo)
- 2020: Bou tonton (feat. Widgunz)
- 2020: Ils se jettent
- 2020: C'est mon weey (feat. King Mad et Lilo Lelikounte)
- 2020: Corona
- 2021: Apoutchou (feat. DJ Lewis)
- 2021: Gnonmi avec lait (feat. Niska)
- 2021: Croussa Croussa (feat. Oyoki Onanayo and Willy Dumbo)
- 2021: Benga (feat. Oyoki Onanayo & Hugo boss)
- 2021: Paris c'est chic (with Junior Bvndo)
- 2021: Baygon (feat. Tisco)
- 2021: Victago
- 2021: Godo Godo
- 2022: Dêguê Fior de Bior feat. Jojo le Barbu

== Conflicts and controversies ==
Fior had previously been in a conflict with Ivorian artist Abome Lelefant.
