= Franck Biyong =

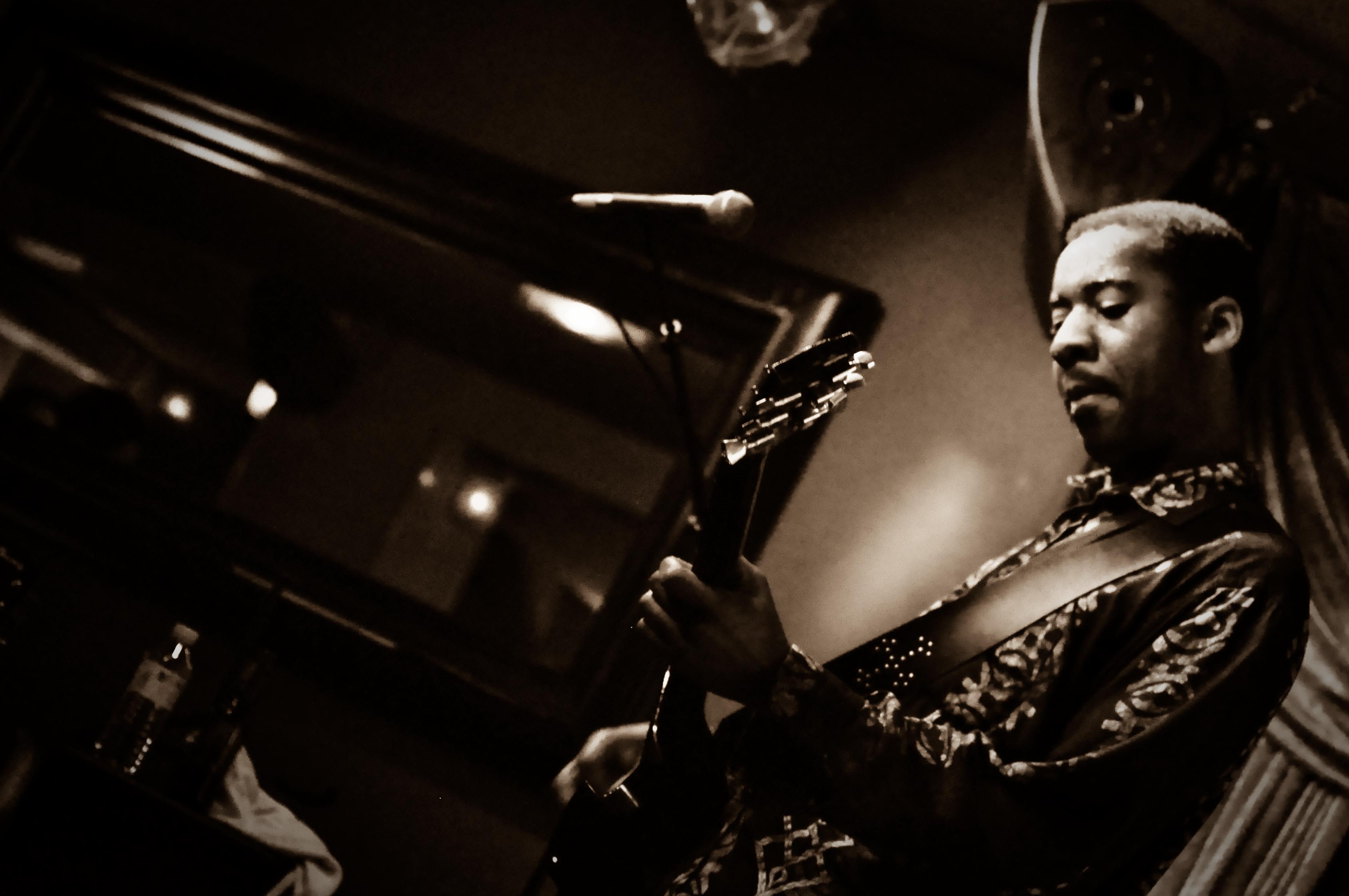
- Franck Biyong playing at China Club in 2010.

Background information
- Born: 1973
- Genres: Alternative, Rock, Experimental, Jazz
- Occupation(s): Musician, Composer
- Instruments: Guitar, Percussion, Vocals, Bass Guitar, Keyboards
- Years active: 1997–present
- Labels: Afrolectric, Africori
- Website: www.franckbiyong.net

Franck Biyong (born 1973 in Cameroon) is a Cameroonian musician, bandleader and record producer. He plays the electric guitar, bass as well as percussion and keyboards. Biyong is the creator of the "Afrolectric" genre, which melds Afrobeat, jazz, and electronic funk. As of 2024, he has released 20 albums.

== Early life and education ==
Franck Biyong was born in France but grew up in Gabon, Nigeria and Ivory Coast. His father went to France as a student, graduated, became an English teacher and moved his family back to West Africa. Biyong and his siblings attended the Institut National Supérieur des Arts et de l'Action Culturelle in Abidjan, Ivory Coast. He originally studied piano but dropped it in favour of drums, percussion and eventually, guitar. Biyong's fondness for African-American Jazz guitarist Wes Montgomery's "Canadian Sunset" got him interested in electric guitar.

At age 14 Biyong moved to England, where he started working with various bands and recording demos influenced by musicians Prince Nico Mbarga, Sun Ra, Frank Zappa, William Onyeabor, King Crimson and many others.

== Career ==
=== Musician ===
Fela Kuti's death in 1997 spurred Biyong's return to France, where he formed fifteen-piece band Massak — a Basaa (Cameroonian tongue and tribe) word that means music, trance and enjoyment through rhythms and sounds — to pay homage to the legendary musician and his Africa 70 and Egypt 80 ensembles. Biyong told Songlines that at two Massak shows at The Jazz Cafe in London "the crowd literally went nuts. Those two gigs really put us on the map."

He termed his music then as "Afrolectric", a meeting of AfroBeat and influence from UK's electronica scene, and went on to form the Afrolectric Music label. Biyong then toured clubs and festivals globally for several years (including appearances at the SOB's in New York, The Jazz Cafe in London and the Montréal Jazz Festival).

Biyong's first full-length album with Massak was Realms of Atlantis, released on his label Afrolectric Music in 2006. His second album was Haiti Market, released in 2007 jointly on Le Son de Maquis and Afrolectric; Daniel Brown of Songlines described the album as "a sumptuous collage of Afrobeat, soul, funk and jazz."

From that point on, Biyong released a new album every year: 2008 brought Spirits into Sounds, 2009 saw the experimental Rhythms of our Memory and in 2010, Biyong travelled to Cameroon to record his fifth album, Visions of Kamerun, which was mixed by Grant Phabao in Paris. In 2010 Biyong and Massak also released the live album Voodoolectric Ground, which AllMusic said "wove together Biyong's deep love of Jimi Hendrix, Davis, and modal jazz."

Biyong then formed new band The Afrolectric Orkestra, composed of young Caribbean and African musicians based in Europe as well as young rising stars of the Paris' Jazz scene.

The Afrolectric Orkestra joined Biyong on his sixth studio album Jazz & Africa in 2011. It was an album filled with highly original renditions of songs by Manu Dibango, Ornette Coleman and Sun Ra among others. The same year, Biyong released Meeting the Basic Needs of The People.

In 2012 the album Ki i Ye Yi was released, credited to Biyong and The Diamane Bantu Messengers, essentially a variation on Massak with the assistance of the Paris DJs crew, who jointly released the album with Afrolectric Music. The album had cameos by American Tenor Saxophonist Ben Abarbanel-Wolff, musical director for Afrobeat Academy and Ghanaian highlife legends Ebo Taylor and Pat Thomas.

Biyong's EP 21.12.2012 (Truth or Lies?) was released in 2013. That same year, Biyong also issued a cover version of Fela Kuti's I.T.T (International Thief Thief) as a free download single.

In 2015, Biyong released his album Moonwatching, which he called "the world’s first Afro-Electro-Rock album." It was followed by the albums Afro Bikutsi Live! (2017), Evening Prayer (2018), and Afro Galactic Spaceway (2019). Also in 2019, Biyong collaborated with Lipombe Jazz on the album Ibolo Ini.

Biyong released two albums in 2021, Celestial Navigation Suite and The Afrovision Secret, and in 2022, he released Kunde. In 2023, Biyong released the album Moonwatching 2. In an interview, he described "the conscious decision to avoid using keyboards or synths, and experiment as much as possible with pedals and effects to create eerie and surprising sonic textures."

In 2024, Biyong released his 20th album Radio Masoda, which Songlines described as "chock-full of variety and beautifully done".

=== Other ventures ===
As music director on Coke Studio Africa Season 1 and 2, Biyong worked with the likes of Wyclef Jean, Salif Keita, Lady Jaydee, King Sunny Ade, Culture Musical Club, Seun Kuti, Just A Band and David Correy.

== Discography ==
Albums

- Realms Of Atlantis (2006)
- Haiti Market (2007)
- Spirits into Sounds (2008)
- Rhythms of our Memory (2009)
- Visions of Kamerun (2010)
- Voodoolectric Ground (2010)
- Jazz & Africa: Knowledge Identity Reconstruction (2011)
- Meeting the Basic Needs of the People (2011)
- Ki i Ye Yi (2012)
- 21.12.2012 (Truth or Lies?) (2013)
- Moonwatching (2015)
- Afro Bikutsi Live! (2017)
- Evening Prayer (2018)
- Afro Galactic Spaceway (2019)
- Ibolo Ini (with Lipombe Jazz, 2019)
- Celestial Navigation Suite (2021)
- The Afrovision Secret (2021)
- Kunde (2022)
- Moonwatching 2 (2023)
- Radio Masoda (2024)

Singles

- B.L.A (Soul Fire / Truth & Soul) (2002)
- Live! (Melting Pot Music) (2003)
- We Shall overcome (Hot Casa Records) (2004)
- Power Brain (Hot Casa Records / Rush Hour) (2005)
- EP (Favorite Recordings) (2006)
- AfrofunkyDance (Hot Casa Records / Rush Hour) (2007)
- UPC (Paris Djs) (2010)
- Fe Bain (Paris Djs) (2012)
- C.F.A Music (Paris Djs) (2012)
- I.T.T (Free Download) (2013)
- End of the Road (Africori) (2015)
- Liyomba Church (Africori) (2016)
- The Lamp, Light and Eye of God (2019)
- Trouble (Hot Casa Records) (2020)
- Silence is Music (Believe Digital) (2023)
