= Calema =

Music duo from São Tomé and Príncipe and Portugal

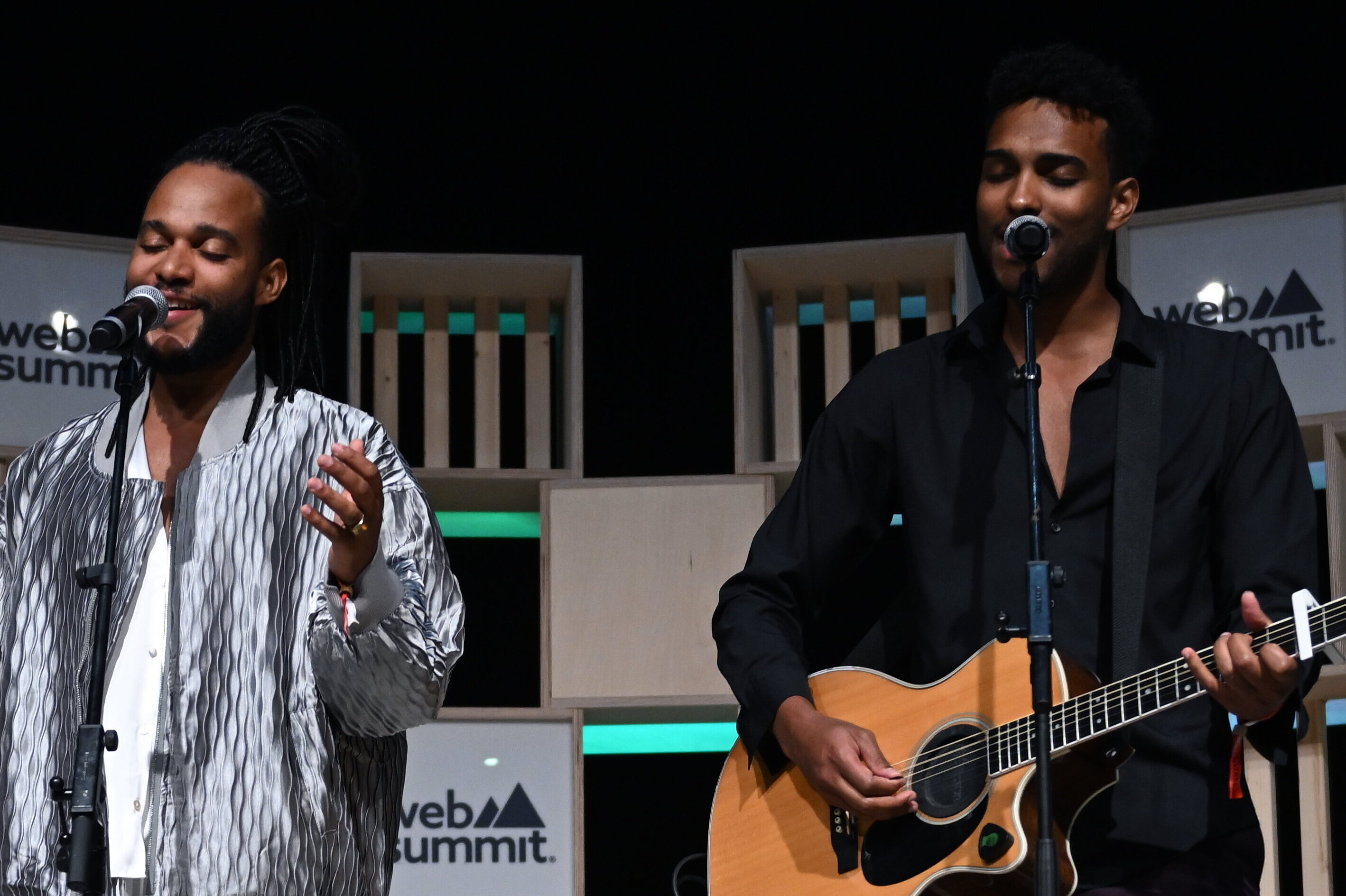
- Calema performing in 2022

Background information
- Origin: São Tomé and Príncipe and Portugal
- Genres: Pop, Afropop, R&B, Kizomba-pop
- Years active: 2011–present
- Label: Klasszik
- Members: António Mendes Ferreira; Fradique Mendes Ferreira

Calema are a Portugal-based music duo from São Tomé and Príncipe formed by the two brothers António Mendes Ferreira (born 5 April 1992) and Fradique Mendes Ferreira (born 19 March 1987). The name of the duo refers to the special undulation on the African coast. Calema is one of the most successful musical acts of the 2020s in Portugal.

== Early life ==
They started singing together at a very young age as they took music as a hobby. In 2008, after being crowned Absolute Winners in the 1st National Santomean Music Competitions, held in their homeland, they came to Portugal to pursue their professional degrees in the music industry. Fradique pursued a degree in Multimedia in Évora and António, a degree in Video Production in Lisbon. In 2011 they went to France with their family and kept on doing music, as they created their cover channel on YouTube.

== Career ==
While they were in France, they kept entering talent shows, winning one of them called "Luso artist". Three years later, Anselmo Ralph noticed them and made them enter the Portuguese music scene. Later on, they produced the album A Nossa Vez – or simply A.N.V – which included the single "A Nossa Vez". The song ended 2017 as the most viewed non-Brazilian music video of a song in Portuguese on YouTube that year.

In February 2019 they were announced as the composers and interpreters of the song "A Dois", which participated on the Festival da Canção 2019.

== Discography ==
=== Studio albums ===
| Title | Details | Peak chart positions |
| Title | Details | POR |
|---|---|---|
| Ni Mondja Anguené | Released: 2010 (POR); Label: Harmonia | — |
| Bomu Kêlê | Released: 2014 (POR); Label: Distrirecords | — |
| A Nossa Vez | Released: 20 October 2017 (POR); Label: Klasszik | 3 |
| Yellow | Released: 7 February 2020 (POR); Label: Klasszik | 1 |

=== Live albums ===
| Title | Details | Peak chart positions |
| Title | Details | POR |
|---|---|---|
| Ao vivo no Campo Pequeno | Released: 2019 (POR); Label: Klasszik | 3 |

=== Singles ===
- 2019: "A Dois"
- 2020: "Vai"
- 2022: "Te Amo"
