= Afrobeat =

West African music genre

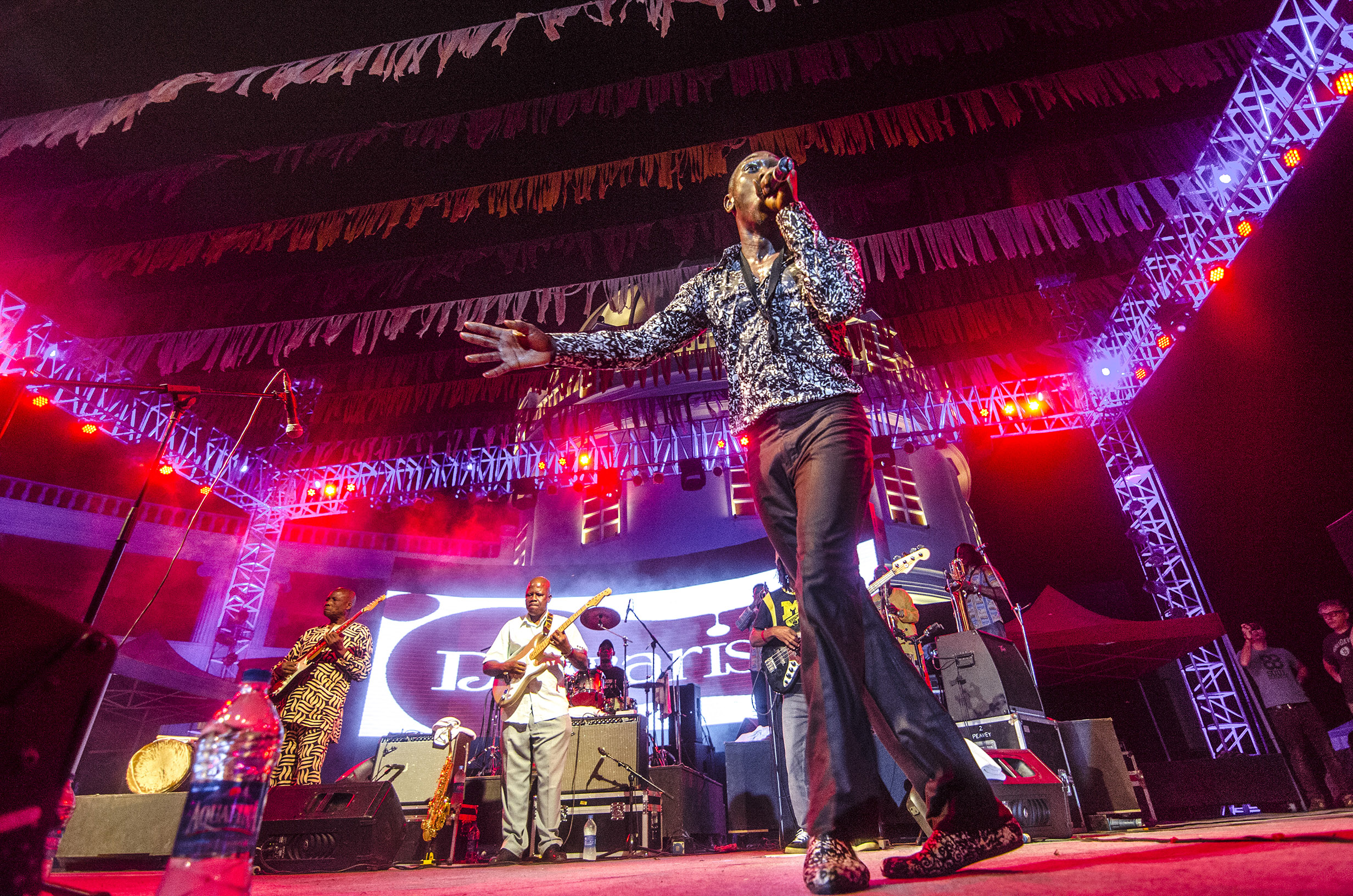
- Seun Kuti during an Afrobeat performance
- Stylistic origins: West African music; highlife; Yoruba music; funk; jazz; soul; fuji music
- Cultural origins: 1960s, Nigeria
- Typical instruments: Bass guitar; sakara drum; drums; guitar; horns; Hammond organ; keyboards; percussion; Ogene; saxophone; shekere; vocals
- Derivative forms: Afrobeats

Regional scenes
- Nigeria

Afrobeat (also known as Afrofunk) is a West African music genre, fusing influences from Yoruba and Ghanaian (such as highlife) music with American funk, jazz, and soul influences. With a focus on chanted vocals, complex intersecting rhythms, and percussion, the style was pioneered in the 1960s by Nigerian multi-instrumentalist and bandleader Fela Kuti, who popularised it both within and outside Nigeria. At the height of his popularity, he was referred to as one of Africa's most "challenging and charismatic music performers."

Distinct from Afrobeat is Afrobeats, a combination of sounds originating in West Africa in the 21st century. This takes on diverse influences and is an eclectic combination of genres such as hip hop, house, jùjú, ndombolo, R&B, soca, and dancehall. The two genres, though often conflated, are not the same.

== History ==
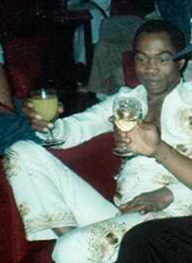
Fela Kuti

Afrobeat evolved in Nigeria in the late 1960s by Fela Kuti, who, with drummer Tony Allen, experimented with different contemporary music of that time. Afrobeat was influenced by a combination of different genres, such as highlife, fuji, and jùjú, as well as Yoruba vocal traditions, rhythm, and instruments. In the late 1950s, Kuti left Lagos to study abroad at the London School of Music, where he took lessons in piano and percussion and was exposed to jazz. Kuti returned to Lagos and played a highlife-jazz hybrid, albeit, without commercial success.

In 1969, Kuti and his band went on a trip to the U.S. and met a woman by the name of Sandra Smith, a singer and former Black Panther. Sandra Smith (now known as Sandra Izsadore or Sandra Akanke Isidore) introduced Kuti to many writings of activists such as Martin Luther King Jr., Angela Davis, Jesse Jackson, and his biggest influence of all, Malcolm X.

As Kuti was interested in African-American politics, Smith would make it her duty to inform Kuti of current events; in return, Kuti would fill her in on African culture. Since Kuti stayed at Smith's house and spent so much time with her, he started to re-evaluate his music genre. That was when Kuti realized that he was not playing African music. From that day forward, Kuti changed his sound and the message behind his music.

Upon arriving in Nigeria, Kuti had also changed the name of his group to "Africa '70". The new sound hailed from a club he established called the Afrika Shrine. The band maintained a five-year residency at the Afrika Shrine from 1970 to 1975 while Afrobeat thrived among Nigerian youth. Ray Stephen Oche, a Nigerian musician, promoted the genre with his matumbo orchestra in France throughout the 1970s.

The name was partially born out of an attempt to distinguish Fela Kuti's music from the soul music of American artists such as James Brown.

Prevalent in his and Lagbaja's music are native Nigerian harmonies and rhythms, taking contrasting elements and combining, modernizing, and improvising upon them. Politics is essential to Afrobeat because Kuti uses social criticism to pave the way for change. His message can be described as confrontational and controversial, which relates to the political climate of most African countries in the 1970s, many of which were dealing with political injustice and military corruption while recovering from the transition from colonial governments to self-determination. Many bands took up the style as the genre spread throughout the African continent. The recordings of these bands and their songs were rarely heard or exported outside the originating countries, but many can now be found on compilation albums and CDs from specialist record shops.

== Influence ==
Many jazz musicians have been influenced by Afrobeat. From Roy Ayers in the 1970s to Randy Weston in the 1990s, there have been collaborations that resulted in albums such as Africa: Centre of the World by Roy Ayers, released on the Polydore label in 1981. In 1994, Branford Marsalis, the American jazz saxophonist, included samples of Fela's "Beasts of No Nation" on his Buckshot LeFonque album.

Afrobeat has also profoundly influenced various contemporary producers and musicians, such as Brian Eno and David Byrne, who credit Fela Kuti as an essential influence to their creativity. Both worked on Talking Heads' highly acclaimed 1980 album Remain in Light, which brought polyrhythmic Afrobeat influences to Western music. The new generation of DJs and musicians of the 2000s who have fallen in love with both Kuti's material and other rare releases have made compilations and remixes of these recordings, thus re-introducing the genre to new generations of listeners and fans of afropop and groove.

In the late 1990s and early 2000s, a small Afrobeat scene began in Brooklyn, New York, with projects including Antibalas, The Daktaris and the Kokolo Afrobeat Orchestra. Since then, other artists like Zongo Junction have come onto the scene. Many others have cited Afrobeat as an influence, like Daptone Records-adjacent groups The Budos Band and El Michels Affair. The horn section of Antibalas have been guest musicians on TV on the Radio's highly acclaimed 2008 album Dear Science, as well as on British band Foals' 2008 album Antidotes. Further examples are Val Veneto, Radio Bantu, Tam Tam Afrobeat, Combo Makabro, Marabunta Orquesta, Minga!, Antropofonica, Guanabana Afrobeat Orquesta, El Gran Capitan, Morbo y Mambo, Luka Afrobeat Orquesta or NikiLauda. Some Afrobeat influence can also be found in the music of Vampire Weekend and Paul Simon. In 2020, Antibalas was nominated for the Grammy Award for Best Global Music Album.

Afrobeat artists of the 2000s and present continue to follow in the footsteps of Fela Kuti. Some examples of these artists are his sons Femi Kuti and Seun Kuti, Franck Biyong & Massak (from Cameroon), London Afrobeat Collective (from London, UK), Segun Damisa & the Afro-beat Crusaders, Shaolin Afronauts (from Adelaide, Australia), Newen Afrobeat (from Santiago, Chile), Lagos to Longbenton (based in Newcastle, UK), Eddy Taylor & the Heartphones (from Cologne, Germany), Bantucrew, the Albinoid Afrobeat Orchestra / Albinoid Sound System (from Strasbourg, France), Underground System / Underground System Afrobeat (from Brooklyn, New York), Abayomy Afrobeat Orquestra, Chicago Afrobeat Orchestra, Warsaw Afrobeat Orchestra, Karl Hector & the Malcouns (from Munich, Germany), Ojibo Afrobeat (from Vilnius, Lithuania), Afrodizz and Dele Sosimi and the ex-Africa '70 members Oghene Kologbo (guitar) with Afrobeat Academy, Nicholas Addo-Nettey (percussion), who is also known as Pax Nicholas, with Ridimtaksi (both based in Berlin, Germany). Namibian artist EES (Eric Sell) associates Afrobeat with reggae and kwaito.

In 2009, the music label Knitting Factory Records (KFR) produced the Broadway musical Fela! The story showcased Kuti's "courage and incredible musical mastery" along with the story of his life. The show had 11 Tony nominations, receiving three for Best Costumes, Best Sound and Best Choreography. Fela! was on Broadway for 15 months and was produced by notables such as Shawn "Jay-Z " Carter and Will and Jada Pinkett-Smith. Many celebrities were noted as attending the shows, including Denzel Washington, Madonna, Sting, Spike Lee (who saw it eight times), Kofi Annan, and Michelle Obama. Michelle Williams, former singer of girl group Destiny's Child, was cast as the role of Sandra Izsadore.

Fela Kuti's music has been sampled by various hip-hop musicians such as Missy Elliott, J. Cole, and Kanye West, as well as other popular acts such as Beyoncé.

The "Festival de Afrobeat Independiente" (FAI) takes place regularly in Buenos Aires, where regional bands as well as renown Afrobeat acts perform.

== See also ==
- Afrobeats
- Afroswing
- Confusion (album)
- Latin music (genre)
