= Hanscana =

Tanzanian cinematographer

- Born: April 26, 1994 (age 32)
- Citizenship: Tanzanian
- Occupation: Music video director
- Years active: 2014 - present
- Organization: Hanscana Brand
- Notable work: "Nasema Nawe" by Diamond Platnumz
- Style: Visually oriented storytelling approach

Hanscana is a Tanzanian music video director and cinematographer known for his distinctive visually oriented storytelling style in music videos. He has been credited for directing over three hundred music videos spanning various genres since 2014, including Diamond Platnumz, Vanessa Mdee, Harmonize, Jux, Otile Brown, Butera Knowles, Eddy Kenzo, Zuchu, Khaligraph Jones, Mwana FA, Christina Shusho, Mbosso, Rayvannny and Nandy.

== Early Career and Studio Establishment ==
Hanscana started his career in music video production in the mid-2010s. He gained experience by working with established directors, developing his skills in cinematography and lighting. His first video was Moyoni by Tanzanian duo Navy Kenzo. Since then, Hanscana has directed over 300 music videos. In 2016, he co-founded Wanene Films, a production studio located in Mikocheni, Dar es Salaam.

== Career and influence ==
Hanscana's career as a music video director began to gain momentum during his time at Wanene Films, a production studio he co-founded in Dar es Salaam. During his early years at Wanene Films, Hanscana collaborated with a range of artists, including Kenyan singer Avril, Tanzanian Bongo Flava artists Rich Mavoko, Vanessa Mdee, Barnaba, Darassa, and Diamond Platnumz. Hanscana credits Diamond Platnumz with playing a significant role in his early career development, noting that he accompanied him on trips to South Africa during video shoots with Godfather Productions, gaining valuable experience.

A pivotal moment in Hanscana's career came with the release of "Nasema Nawe" by Diamond Platnumz, a music video he directed and filmed. This video was notable for being shot entirely in Tanzania. This marked a change from the established practice where Tanzanian artists frequently sought video production services in Kenya or South Africa for higher production value. "Nasema Nawe" became a significant release in Hanscana's portfolio, demonstrating his capabilities in producing high-quality music videos within Tanzania.

Following the success of his early works, Hanscana expanded his work across genres such as Bongo Flava, Hip Hop, R&B, Singeli, and Gospel. He has consistently collaborated with prominent East African artists including Rayvanny, Harmonize, Mbosso, Otile Brown, Dully Sykes, Zuchu, Khaligraph Jones, and Marioo. In 2022 and 2023, Hanscana was nominated for Best Video Director at African Muzik Magazine Awards (AFRIMMA). In 2022, Hanscana won the Best Director at the Tanzanian Music Awards and was nominated again in 2024.

Hanscana has also played a significant role in the development of Tanzanian music video directors. Through initiatives such as the "Hanscana Brand," he has mentored and trained emerging directors, including Director Kenny. These efforts have contributed to the professional growth of individuals within the Tanzanian music video industry and are considered to have strengthened the local production sector.

== Videography ==
This section lists selected music videos directed by Hanscana.

=== Diamond Platnumz ===
- Nitafanyaje (2025)
- Oka ft. Mbosso (2022)
- Naanzaje (2021)
- IYO ft. Focalistic (2021)
- Nasema Nawe (2015)

=== Zuchu ===
- Kiss ft. Innoss'B (2023)
- Mwambieni (2022)
- Nyumba Ndogo (2021)

=== Marioo ===
- Tikisa (2020)
- Raha (2019)

=== Rayvanny ===
- Lala ft. Jux (2021)
- Sweet ft. Guchi (2021)

=== Mbosso ===
- Yalah (2021)
- Yes ft. Spice Diana (2021)
- Mtaalam (2021)
- Nipepee (2020)

=== Harmonize ===
- Woman with. Otile Brown (2022)
- Ushamba (2020)
- Jeshi (2020)
- Mpaka Kesho (2020)

=== Lava Lava ===
- Inatosha (2021)
- Komesha (2021)

=== Other Artists ===
- Billnass - Tatizo
- Christina Shusho - Shusha Nyavu
- Jux & Gyakie - I Love You (2022)
- Jux - Sina Neno (2021)
- Otile Brown & Alikiba - In Love (2021)
- Otile Brown & Darassa - K.O (2021)
- Masauti ft. Tanasha Donna - Liar (2020)
- Nay wa Mitego - Chini (2021)
- Nadia Mukami & Otile Brown - Lolo (2021)
- Ibraah ft. Harmonize - One Night Stand (2021)
- Zabron Singers - Ni Wewe Mungu (2021)
