= 2012 Tanzania Music Awards =

13th edition of the awards

The 13th edition of the Tanzania Music Awards took place at the Mlimani City Conference Center in Dar es Salaam, on Saturday 14 April 2012. The event was hosted by Vanessa Mdee and Millard Ayo. The nominees were announced on 8 February 2012 with Bongo Flava artist Diamond Platnumz topping the list with seven nominations. Two days later, four-time nominee Dully Sykes announced his withdrawal from the event. He stated that 'it does not contribute to my growth whatsoever, and this contest is full of lies'. After leaving the 2011 Tanzania Music Awards empty-handed, Diamond Platnumz made a strong return in 2012, winning three awards, including Best Male Artist and Best Video.

== Nominees and winners ==
Winners are in bold text.

=== Best Male Artist ===
- **Diamond Platnumz**
- Ali Kiba
- Bob Junior
- Dully Sykes
- Mzee Yusuf

=== Best Female Artist ===
- **Khadija Kopa**
- Dayna
- Isha Mashauzi
- Queen Darleen
- Shaa

=== Best Male Singer ===
- **Barnaba Classic**
- Ali Kiba
- Belle 9
- Diamond Platnumz
- Mzee Yusuf

=== Best Female Singer ===
- **Lady Jaydee**
- Dayna
- Isha Mashauzi
- Khadija Kopa
- Linah

=== Best Song Writer ===
- **Diamond Platnumz**
- Ali Kiba
- Barnaba Classic
- Belle 9
- Mzee Yusuf

=== Best Upcoming Artist ===
- **Ommy Dimpoz**
- Abdu Kiba
- Beatrice Nabisha
- Darassa
- Recho

=== Best Hip Hop Artist ===
- **Roma**
- Fid Q
- Godzilla
- Izzo B
- Joh Makini

=== Best Rapper (from a Band) ===
- **Kalijo Kitokololo**
- Ferguson
- Khalid Chokoraa
- Msafiri Diouf
- Toto ze Bingwa

=== Best Song ===
- **Suma Lee - 'Hakunaga'**
- Ali Kiba - 'Dushelele'
- Belle 9 - 'Nilipe Nisepe'
- Diamond Platnumz - 'Moyo Wangu'
- Izzo B - 'Riz One'
- Roma - 'Mathematics'

=== Best Video ===
- **Diamond Platnumz - 'Moyo Wangu'**
- Dully Sykes - 'Bongo flava'
- Kassim Mganga feat Mr Blue - 'Ndoa ndoana'
- Lady Jamra feat Mr Blue - 'Wangu'
- Suma Lee - 'Hakunaga'

=== Best Afro Pop Song ===
- **Suma Lee - 'Hakunaga'**
- Diamond Platnumz - 'Mawazo'
- Diamond Platnumz - 'Moyo Wangu'
- Dully Sykes - 'Bongo flava'
- Ommy Dimpoz ft Ali Kiba- 'Nai Nai'

=== Best R&B Song ===
- **Ben Pol - 'My Number One Fan'**
- Ben Pol ft One - 'Maumivu'
- Belle 9 - 'Nilipe Nisepe'
- Hemed - 'Usiniache'
- Jux - 'Napata Raha'

=== Best Zouk/Rhumba Song ===
- **Ali Kiba - 'Dushelele'**
- Barnaba - 'Daima milele'
- Dayna & Barnaba - 'Nivute kwako'
- Lady Jaydee feat Mr Blue - 'Wangu'
- Recho - 'Kizungu zungu'

=== Best Hip Hop Song ===
- **Roma - 'Mathematics'**
- Godzilla ft Marco Chali - 'King Zila'
- Izzo B - 'Riz One'
- Jay Mo ft P-Funk Majani - 'Famous'
- Joh Makini ft Lady Jaydee, G Nako - 'Kilimanjaro'

=== Best Collaboration Song ===
- **Ommy Dimpoz ft Ali Kiba- 'Nai Nai'**
- Chege, Temba & Ferouz - 'Kama ni gangstar'
- Godzilla feat Marco Chali - 'King zilla'
- Jay Mo feat ft P-Funk Majani - 'Famous'
- Lady Jaydee feat Mr Blue - 'Wangu'

=== Best Swahili Song (from a Band) ===
- **African Stars - 'Dunia Daraja'**
- Extra Bongo - 'Falsafa ya Mapenzi
- Extra Bongo - 'Mtenda'
- Mashujaa Band - 'Hukumu ya Mnafiki'
- Mapacha Watatu - 'Usia wa Babu'

=== Best Ragga/Dancehall Song ===
- **Queen Darleen ft Dully Sykes - 'Maneno Maneno'**
- AY feat Ms. Triniti - 'Good look'
- Dabo - 'Ganja man'
- Malfred - 'Kudadeki'
- Malfred - 'Poyoyo'

=== Best Reggae Song ===
- **Warrior from the East - 'Arusha Gold'**
- 20 Percent - 'Ni yao'
- Delyla princess - 'Give it up to me'
- Nakaaya - 'Ni wewe'
- Malfred feat Lutan Fyah - 'Mazingira'

=== Best Taarab Song ===
- **Isha Mashauzi - 'Nani Kama Mama'**
- Isha Mashauzi - 'Mamaa Mashauzi'
- Jahazi Modern Taarab - 'Hakuna Mkamilifu'
- Jahazi Modern Taarab - 'Nilijua Mtasema'
- Khadija Kopa - 'Full Stop'

=== Best East African Song ===
- **Jaguar - 'Kigeugeu'**
- Avril & Marya - 'Chokoza'
- Jose Chameleon - 'Valuvalu'
- Nameless - 'Coming home'
- / Kidum & Sana - 'Mulika mwizi'
- Prezzo - '4sho 4 shizzle'

=== Best Traditional Song ===
- **AT & Mwanne - 'Vifuu Utundu'**
- Ashimba - 'Mwanadamu'
- AT - 'Bao la Kete'
- Young D, Kitokololo & Mataluma - 'Tunapeta'
- Offside Trick & Baby J - 'Kidudu Mtu'

=== Best Producer ===
- **Maneke** (AM Records)
- Bob Junior
- Man Walter
- Marco Chali
- Pancho Latino

=== Hall of Fame trophy ===
- to an individual: **Remmy Ongala**
- to an institution: **JKT**

== See also ==
- Tanzania Music Awards
- Music of Tanzania
