= Nahreel =

Tanzanian Hip-Hop recording artist and record producer

- Born: Emmanuel Mkono; 1989 (age 36–37); Dar es Salaam, Tanzania
- Origin: Mara
- Genres: Trip hop, dancehall, R&B, Afrobeat, Hip hop
- Occupations: Rapper, singer, songwriter, record producer, entrepreneur
- Years active: 2008–present
- Label: The Industry Studios
- Member of: NAVY KENZO
- Partner: Aika Marealle

Emmanuel Mkono (born 12 December 1989 in Dar es Salaam), known by his stage name Nahreel, is a Tanzanian Afro beats / Dancehall recording artist and record producer.

He is the founder and current CEO of The Industry Studios. Nahreel is a co-founder and member of the music group Navy Kenzo. He has produced albums for and overseen the careers of many rappers and singers, including Vanessa Mdee, Joh Makini, Diamond Platnumz, Nikki wa pili, Navy Kenzo, Izzo Biznes, Gnako, K.O, Roma Shrekeezy., He is credited as a key figure in the popularization of English rap in Tanzania.

== Early life ==
Nahreel places his interest in music at the age of 14 when his father bought him a piano and a teacher to tutor him on how to play. He officially began his career in music as an assistant music producer at Kama Kawa records in Dar es Salaam. He worked there for a period of two years before leaving to India to further his studies at Punjab College. His Riz One instrumental for Izzo Bizness, released under MJ Records, led the rapper Izzo Bizness to become one of the best-selling Tanzanian performing artists of 2009. The instrumental also led Nahreel to receive nominations for major awards and to meet the son of the President of the Republic of Tanzania, Ridhiwani Kikwete. He was still in India at this time but the demand for his instrumentals was high back in Tanzania as many hip-hop artists were interested in working with him.

In 2011, he completed his education in India and came back to Tanzania. He produced a couple of singles before joining a couple of his friends to form the music group Pah One.

== The Industry ==
In August 2014, Nahreel opened his own company called The Industry. The Industry comprises The Industry studios (label, public relations, management) and the Industry School Of Music where he is able to establish all his years work in one. The Industry has since then worked upon many major projects with different companies and artists. The Industry label manages two artists including Wildad and rapper, Rosa Ree.

== Navy Kenzo ==
After the break up of Pah One, Nahreel together with Aika (his long time girlfriend) formed a group called Navy Kenzo which became popular with their third single Chelewa and managed to be a hit in Tanzania. They also managed to make other hits like Kamatia Chini, Game (ft Vanessa Mdee), feel good (ft Wildad), Lini (ft Alikiba), Morning (is the first track in their 2016 first ever album 'AIM-Above in a Minute') and Bajaj (ft Patoranking) katika (ft Diamond platinumz). The group managed to produce their first ever album 'ABOVE IN A MINUTE (AIM) featuring big names in Africa such as Patoranking, Alikiba and Vanessa Mdee.

List of awards received by Navy Kenzo

=== WatsUp TV Africa Music Video Awards ===
Year	Nominee / work	Award	Result	Ref
2016	Kamatia	Best Raggae Dancehall Video	Nominated	
2016	Kamatia	Best East African Video	Nominated	
2016	Kamatia	Best Group/Duo Video	Won	

== Weusi ==
Weusi is a hip hop music group composed of Joh Makini, Nikki wa pili, Gnako, Bonta and Lordeyes they are awarded for 2012–2013 best group at KTMA in Tanzania. Nahreel has been working with Joh Makini since 2007 and to date he has created over 10 songs that have also been awarded.

== Portfolio ==
- Stimu zimelipiwa – Joh Makini (2010) (kili awards won best hip hop song of the year)
- Tanzania – Roma Mkatoliki (2008)
- Tanzania – Kala Jeremiah (2008)
- Niaje ni vipi – Joh Makini ft Nikki II (2008)
- Mziki huu – Izzo Bizness (2008)
- Nakabaa koo – Izzo Bizness (2008)
- Kiujamaa – Nikki II (2011)
- RiziOne – Izzo Bizness (2011) (kili awards 3x nom)
- Ghetto – Pah One (2012)
- Amatita – Pah One (2011)
- You – Pah One (2011)
- I wanna get paid – Pah One (2012)
- Kuwa na Subira – Rama Dee (2012)
- Zawadi – Vinega (Anti-Virus) (2012)
- Kila kitu nyerere – Bonta (2011)
- Usinibwage – Aika and Nahreel (2013)
- Come Over – Vanessa Mdee (2013)
- Chelewa – Navy Kenzo (2013)
- Nje ya Box – Nikki II ft Joh Makini and Gnakko (2013)
- Gere – Weusi (2014)
- Namchukua – Shilole (2014)
- Naogopa – Gosby ft Ommy Dimpoz (2014)
- Kolo kolo – Mirror (2014)
- Sukido – Quick Racka ft Barnaba Classic (2014)
- Malele – Shilole (2021
- Hamjui – Vanessa Mdee (2014)
- Aiyola – Navy Kenzo (2014)
- Switch on Jingle – Airtel Tanzania (2014)
- Safari – Nikki wa pili ft Joh Makini, Vanessa Mdee, Jux, Aika & Nahreel (Navy Kenzo) (2014)
- Moyoni – Navy Kenzo (2014)
- I just wanna love you – Navy kenzo (2014)
- Nobody but me – Vanessa Mdee ft K.O (2015)
- Nusu Nusu – Joh Makini (2015)
- Nana – Diamond Platnumz ft Mr Flavour (2015)
- Zigo – AY Tanzania (2015)
- Mfalme – Mwana FA ft Gnakko (2015)
- Game – Navy Kenzo ft Vanessa mdee (2015)
- Looking for you – Jux (2015)
- Laini – Gnakko ft Nikki wa Pili (2015)
- Zigo(Remix) Ay ft Diamond Platnumz
- Kamatia – Navy Kenzo
- Never ever -Vanessa mdee. Waya 2016– Weusi
- Navy Kenzo – Fella ( 2018)
