= 2010 Tanzania music awards =

11th edition of the awards

The 11th edition of the Tanzania Music Awards took place at the Diamond Jubilee Hall in Dar es Salaam, on Friday 14 May 2010. The event was anchored by Jokate Mwegelo. Bongo Flava singer Diamond Platnumz was the big winner of the night with three awards out of four nominations, which is a remarkable result for a newcomer.

== Nominees and winners ==
Winners are in bold text.

=== Best Male Singer ===
- **Banana Zorro**
- Ali Kiba
- Christian Bella
- Marlow
- Mzee Yusuph

=== Best Female Singer ===
- **Lady Jaydee**
- Khadija Yusuph
- Maunda Zoro
- Mwasiti
- Vumilia

=== Best Song Writer ===
- **Mzee Yusuf**
- Banana Zorro
- Fid Q
- Lady Jaydee
- Mrisho Mpoto
- Mzee Abuu

=== Best Upcoming Artist ===
- **Diamond Platnumz**
- Amini
- Barnaba Classic
- Belle 9
- Quick Racka

=== Best Hip Hop Artist ===
- **Chid Benzi**
- Fid Q
- Joh Makini
- Mangwea
- Professor J

=== Best Rapper (from a Band) ===
- **Kitokololo**
- Chokoraa
- Diouf
- Ferguson
- Totoo Ze Bingwa

=== Best Song ===
- **Diamond Platnumz - 'Kamwambie'**
- Banana Zorro - 'Zoba'
- Hussein M - 'Kwa Ajili Yako'
- Marlow - 'Pii Pii'
- Mrisho Mpoto - 'Nikipata Nauli'

=== Best Music Video ===
- **CPwaa - 'Problems'**
- AY - 'Leo'
- Banana Zorro - 'Zoba'
- Diamond Platnumz - 'Kamwambie'
- Lady Jaydee - 'Natamani Kuwa Malaika'

=== Best Afro Pop Song ===
- **Marlaw - 'Pii Pii'**
- Ali Kiba - 'Usiniseme'
- Banana Zorro - 'Zoba'
- Chege - 'Karibu Kiumeni'
- Mataluma - 'Mama Ubaya'

=== Best R&B Song ===
- **Diamond Platnumz - 'Kamwambie'**
- AT featuring Stara Thomas - 'Nipigie'
- Belle 9 - 'Masogange'
- Maunda Zoro - 'Mapenzi ya Wawili'
- Steve - 'Sogea Karibu'

=== Best Hip Hop Song ===
- **Joh Makini - 'Stimu Zimelipiwa'**
- Chid Benz - 'Pom Pom Pisha'
- Fid Q - 'Im a professional'
- Mangwea - 'CNN'
- Quick Racka - 'Bullet'

=== Best Collaboration Song ===
- **AT ft Stara Thomas - 'Nipigie'**
- Barnaba Classic ft Pipi - 'Njia Panda'
- Mwana FA ft ProfessorJay, Sugu - 'Nazeeka Sana'
- Hussein Machozi ft Joh Makini - 'Utaipenda'
- Mangwea ft Fid Q - 'CNN'

=== Best Swahili Song (from a Band) ===
- **African Stars Band - 'Mwana Dar es Salaam'**
- African Stars B - 'Shida Darasa'
- Extra Bongo - 'Mjini Mipango'
- FM Academia - 'Vuta Nikuvute'
- K-Mondo - 'Magambo'
- Machozi Band - 'Nilizama'
- Wahapahapa - 'Chei Chei'

=== Best Album (from a Band) ===
- **African Stars Band - 'Mwana Dar es Salaam'**
- Kalunde Band - 'Hilda'
- Msondo Ngoma - 'Huna Shukurani'

=== Best Ragga/Dancehall Song ===
- **Bwana Misosi - 'Mungu Yuko Bize'**
- Benjamini wa Mambo J - 'Fly'
- Drezzy Chief - 'Wasanii'
- Dully Sykes - 'Shikide'

=== Best Reggae Song ===
- **AY ft Wahu - 'Leo (Reggae remix)'**
- Dabo ft Mwasiti - 'Don't Let I Go'
- Hemedi - 'Alcohol'
- Matonya/Bella -'Umoja ni nguvu'
- Man Snepa - 'Barua'

=== Best Taarab Song ===
- **Jahazi Modern Taraab - 'Daktari wa Mapenzi'**
- 5 Star - 'Wapambe Msitujadili'
- 5 Star - 'Riziki Mwanzo wa chuki'
- Coast - 'Kukupenda isiwe taabu'
- Jahazi Modern Taraab - 'Roho Mbaya Haijengi'

=== Best Taarab Album ===
- **Jahazi Modern Taraab - 'Daktari wa Mapenzi'**
- 5 Stars - 'Riziki Mwanzo wa chuki'
- Coast - 'Kukupenda isiwe taabu'
- EA Melody - 'Kilamtu kivyakevyake'
- New ZNZ Stars - 'Poa Mpenzi'

=== Best East African Song ===
- / **Kidum and Juliana - 'Haturudi Nyuma'**
- Blu*3, Radio & Weasel - 'Where you are'
- Cindy - 'Na wewe'
- Kidum - 'Umenikosea'
- Radio & Weasel - 'Bread and Butter'

=== Best Traditional Song ===
- **Mrisho Mpoto - 'Nikipata Nauli'**
- Machozi Band - 'Mtarimbo'
- Offside Trick - 'Samaki'
- Omari Omari - 'Kupata Majaliwa'
- Wahapahapa Band - 'Chei Chei'

=== Best Producer ===
- **Lamar**
- Man Water
- Marco Chali
- Hermy B

=== Hall of Fame trophy ===
- to an individual: **Zahir Zorro**
- to an institution: **Clouds FM**

== See also ==
Tanzania Music Awards
