= Bob Junior =

Actor

- Also known as: Bob Junior
- Born: Raheem Rummy Nanji; 19 March 1986 (age 39); Tanzania
- Origin: Iringa, Tanzania
- Genres: Bongo Flava; AfroPop; R&B; dance-pop
- Occupations: Singer; songwriter; Actor; Dancer
- Instruments: guitar, piano

Bob Junior (born 19 March 1986) is a Tanzanian Bongo Flava musician, producer, songwriter and an actor. He owns his own studio called Sharobaro Records.

He has been twice nominated for the Tanzania Music Awards, once in 2011 for Best Upcoming Artist and in 2012 for Best Male Artist.
