= 2011 Tanzania Music Awards =

12th edition of the awards

The 12th edition of the Tanzania Music Awards took place at the Diamond Jubilee Hall in Dar es Salaam, on Saturday March 26, 2011. Bongo Flava artist 20 Percent was the big winner of the night with five trophies out of seven nominations. The artist himself was not present and he was represented by his producer Man Water. Winner Lady Jaydee was also absent during the Award ceremony and a fan collected the two awards on her behalf. The artist later stated she had not received an invitation for the event. Singer Diamond Platnumz, who won three awards in the 2010 Tanzania Music Awards was nominated in four categories, although he was among those who left empty-handed.

== Nominees and winners ==
Winners are in bold text.

=== Best Male Artist ===
- **20 Percent**
- Ali Kiba
- AY
- Barnaba Classic
- Belle 9
- Diamond Planumz

=== Best Female Artist ===
- **Lady Jaydee**
- Khadija Kopa
- Linah
- Mwasiti
- Shaa

=== Best Male Singer ===
- **20 Percent**
- Ali Kiba
- Banana Zorro
- Barnaba Classic
- Belle 9
- Diamond Platnumz

=== Best Female Singer ===
- **Linah**
- Khadija Kopa
- Lady Jaydee
- Mwasiti
- Shaa

=== Best Song Writer ===
- **20 Percent**
- Barnaba Classic
- Lady Jaydee
- Mrisho Mpoto
- Mzee Yusuph

=== Best Upcoming Artist ===
- **Linah**
- Bob Junior
- Sajna
- Sam wa Ukweli
- Top C

=== Best Hip Hop Artist ===
- **Joh Makini**
- Chidi Benz
- Fid Q
- Godzilla
- Albert Mangwea

=== Best Rapper (from a Band) ===
- **Khalid Chokoraa**
- Ferguson
- Kitokololo
- Msafiri Diouf
- Toto ze Bingwa

=== Best Song ===
- **20 Percent - 'Tamaa Mbaya'**
- 20 Percent - 'Ya Nini Malumbano'
- Chege & Temba feat Wahu - 'Mkono Mmoja'
- Gelly wa Rhymes feat A.T & Ray C - 'Mama Ntilie'
- Sam wa Ukweli - 'Sina Raha'
- Tip Top Connection - 'Bado Tunapanda'

=== Best Video ===
- **CPWAA ft Ms. Triniti, Mangwair & Dully Sykes - 'Action'**
- 20 Percent - 'Ya nini Malumbano'
- 20 Percent - 'Tamaa Mbaya'
- Bob Junior - 'Oyoyo'
- Diamond Platnumz - 'Mbagala'
- Gelly wa Ryme feat AT & Ray C - 'Mama Ntilie'

=== Best Afro Pop Song ===
- **20 Percent - 'Ya Nini Malumbano'**
- 20 Percent - 'Tamaa Mbaya'
- Bob Junior - 'Oyoyo'
- Diamond - 'Mbagala'
- Gelly wa Ryhmes Ft AT & Ray C - 'Mama ntilie'

=== Best R&B Song ===
- **Ben Pol - 'Nikikupata'**
- Belle 9 - 'We ni Wangu'
- Hussein Machozi ft Maunda Zorro - 'Hello'
- Linah - 'Atatamani'
- Z-Anton - 'Kisiwa cha Malavidavi'

=== Best Zouk/Rumba Song ===
- **Barnaba - 'Nabembelezwa'**
- Amini - 'Bado Robo Saa'
- Linah - 'Bora Nikimbie'
- Sam wa Ukweli - 'Sina Raha'
- Top C - 'Ulofa'

=== Best Hip Hop Song ===
- **JCB ft Fid Q & Chidi Benz - 'Ukisikia Paah'**
- AY & Mwana FA - 'Usije Mjini'
- Fid Q - 'Propaganda'
- Joh Makini - 'Karibu Tena'
- Nick wa Pili ft Joh Makini- 'Higher'

=== Best Collaboration Song ===
- **JCB ft Fid Q & Chidi Benz & Jay Moe- 'Ukisikia Paah'**
- Chege & Temba ft Wahu - 'Mkono Mmoja'
- FA & AY ft Hardmad - 'Dakika Moja'
- Gelly wa Ryme feat AT & Ray C - 'Mama Ntilie'
- Offside trick ft Bi Kidude - 'Ahmada'

=== Best Swahili Song (from a Band) ===
- **Mapacha Watatu ft Mzee Yusuph - 'Shika Ushikapo'**
- Akudo - 'Pongezi kwa Wanandao'
- Extra Bongo - 'Laptop'
- Twanga Pepeta - 'Kauli'
- Twanga Pepeta - 'Mapenzi hayana kiapo'

=== Best Ragga/Dancehall Song ===
- **CPWAA ft Ms. Triniti, Albert Mangwea & Dully Sykes - 'Action'**
- Benjamin wa mambo Jambo - 'My Friend'
- Benjamin wa mambo Jambo ft AT - 'Nimefulia'
- Big Jah Man ft Richard - 'Far Away'
- Jet Man - 'Kiuno Weka Busy'

=== Best Reggae Song ===
- **Hardmad ft Enika & BNV- 'Ujio Mpya'**
- Bob Lau Mwalugaja - 'Reggae Swadakta'
- Hardmad - 'What u Feel inside'
- Jhiko Man - 'Sayuni'
- Ras Rwanda Magere - 'Sauti ya rasta'
- Warriors from the East - 'Misinga ya Rasta'

=== Best Taarab Song ===
- **Jahazi - 'My Valentine'**
- Isha Ramadhani - 'Acheni Kuniandama'
- Isha Ramadhani - 'Mama Nipe Radhi'
- Jahazi - 'Langu Rohoni'
- Khadija Kopa - 'Top in Town'

=== Best East African Song ===
- / **Kidum & Lady Jaydee - 'Nitafanya'**
- Alpha ft AY - 'Songa Mbele'
- Bebe Cool - 'Kasepiki'
- Goodlyfe Crew - 'Vuvuzela'
- P-Unit - 'Kare'

=== Best Traditional Song ===
- **Mpoki ft Cassim - 'Shangazi'**
- Mataluma - 'Kariakoo'
- Mrisho Mpoto - 'Adela'
- Offsidetrick ft Bi Kidude - 'Ahmada'
- Ommy G - 'Wa Mbele Mbele'

=== Best Producer ===
- **Lamar**
- Bob Junior
- Man Walter
- Marco Chali
- Pancho Latino

=== Hall of Fame trophy ===
- to an individual: **Said Mabera**
- to an institution: Tanzania Broadcasting Radio (TBC): Institutional Award for their preservation of Tanzania's musical heritage

== See also ==
- Tanzania Music Awards
- Music of Tanzania
