= Albert Mangwea =

Tanzanian Hip hop artist

- Born: Albert Keneth Mangweha; 16 November 1982; Mbeya Region, Tanzania
- Died: 28 May 2013 (aged 30); Helen Joseph Hospital, Johannesburg, South Africa
- Resting place: Kihonda, Morogoro Region, Tanzania
- Education: Mazengo Secondary School
- Occupation: Rapper • Songwriter • Entrepreneur
- Notable work: Mikasi; Kimya Kimya
- Awards: 2011 Tanzania Music Awards
- Musical career
- Origin: Dodoma, Tanzania
- Genres: Tanzanian hip hop; Hip hop; gangsta rap; political hip hop; Bongo Flava
- Instruments: Vocals
- Labels: Bongo Records; Independent
- Formerly of: Chemba Squad; East Zoo

Albert Keneth Mangweha (November 16, 1982 - May 28, 2013) who used aliases; Ngwair, Mangwea, Mangwair, and Ngwea was a Tanzanian hip hop artist predominantly known for his freestyle punchlines and hardcore rap style.

== Early life ==
Mangwea was born on November 16, 1982 in Mbeya, Tanzania as the 10th and the youngest child of his family. He attended at Mazengo Technical College.

== Music career ==
Mangwea's career started back in 2003 when he released his first track 'Ghetto langu,' produced by P. Funk Majani. In 2004, he released his first ever album, 'AKA MIMI' that is considered one of Tanzanian's best Hip hop albums of all time. He won the Tanzania Music Awards as the Best Hip Hop artist the same year. He was the owner of 120 carnival liquor hub at Sinza, Dar es Salaam which was demolished after his death.

== Discography ==
ALBUMS

- 2004: AKA MIMI
- 2009: N'GE 1982

SINGLES

- CNN ft Fid Q
- Mapenzi gani ft Lady Jaydee
- Aminia feat Inspecta Haruni, Mwana FA
- Birthday N'GE ft Mwasiti, TID & Mez B
- Speed 120 ft Chid Beenz
- Tanzania Hustler ft J-Son
- She performs ft TID
- Mafia ft. Jay Moe
- Bado nimo
- Salamu
- Mademu wangu
- Mida mibovu ft Juma Nature, Ferooz, P. Funk Majani, Dark Master & Jay Moe
- Kimya Kimya
- Nipe deal
- Singida Dodoma ft Dully Sykes
- Alikufa kwa ngoma
- Napokea simu
- Weekend
- Sikiliza
- Wife
- Tupo juu ft Squeezer & Steve RNB
- Ghetto langu
- Clubbin'
- She got a Gwan

== Controversial death ==
Mangweha was touring South Africa when he was found unconscious in his room and rushed to Helen Joseph Hospital in Johannesburg where he was pronounced dead on Tuesday noon of May 28, 2013. Controversies arose when reports concerning the cause of his death came out; some reports suggested that he died from alcohol intoxication while other reports suggested that he died from drug overdose. Both suggestions left unsolved puzzle concerning the actual cause of Mangweha's death. He was laid to rest on June 3, 2013 at Kihonda in Morogoro Region, Tanzania.
