= List of awards and nominations received by Lady Jaydee =

Lady Jaydee awards and nominations
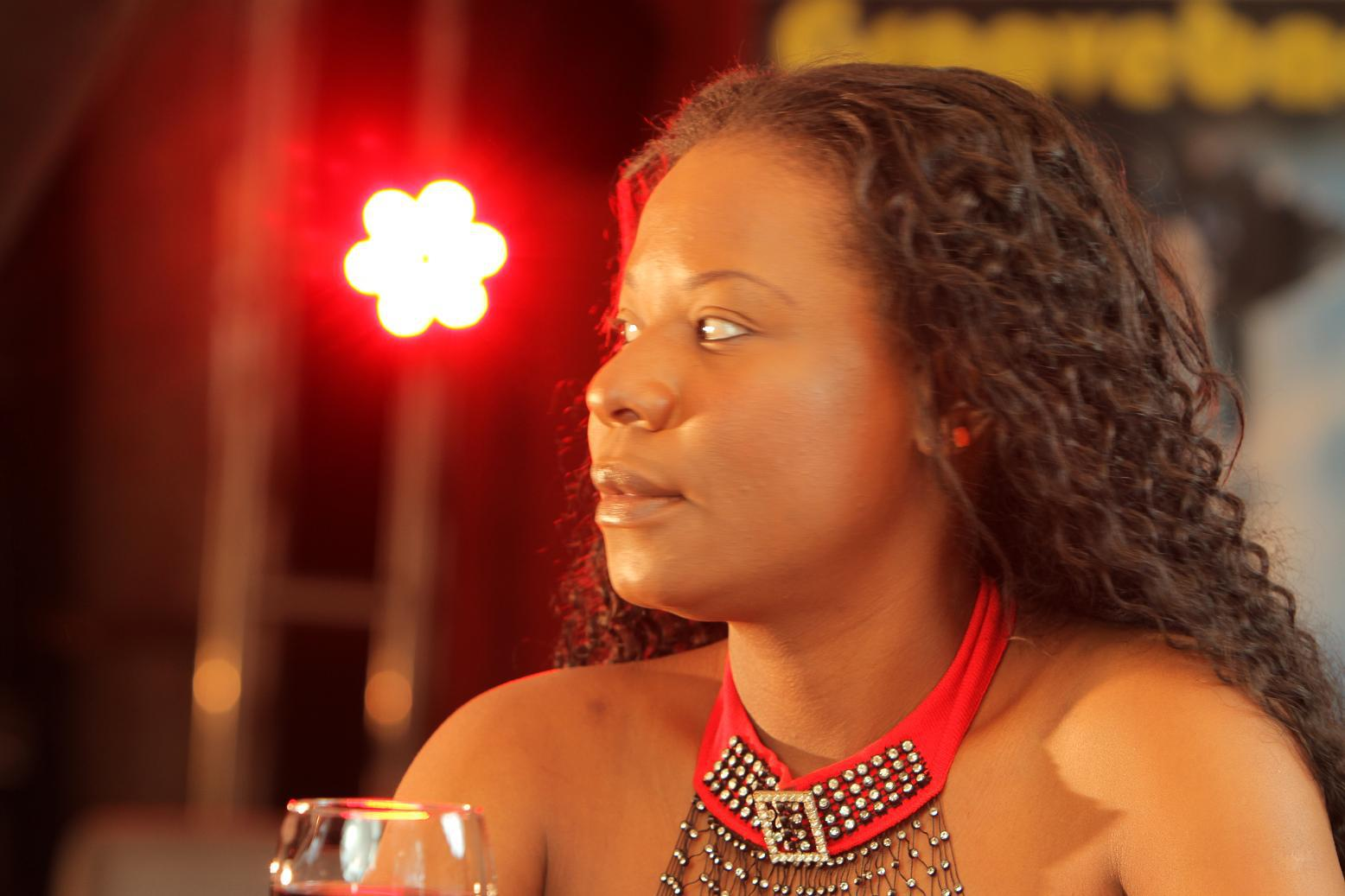
Awards and nominations
Award	Wins	Nominations
Channel O Music Video Awards	1	1
Kora Awards	5	9
Pearl of Africa Music Awards	7	11
M-Nets Africa Awards	1	1
World Music Awards	0	3
MTV Africa Music Awards	2	4
African Muzik Magazine Awards	2	6

Lady Jaydee is a Tanzanian singer. She specializes in the R&B/Zouk/Afro Pop genres. She is the recipient of more than 10 Tanzania Music Awards, an Africa Magazine Muzik Award, an East Africa TV Award, an All African Music Award, a Clouds FM Award, two Kenya Bingwa Music Awards, and many more.

== Channel O Music Video Awards ==
Year	Nominee / work	Award	Result
2003	Machozi	Best African East	Won
2005	Distance	Best Video East Africa	Won
2005	Makini (Ft Titi)	Best Collaboration Video	Won
2006	Njalo (Featuring Mina Nawe)	Best Collaboration	Nominated

== Kora Awards ==
Year	Nominee / work	Award	Result
2003	Herself	Most Promising Female Artist Africa	Nominated
2005	Herself	Best Female Artist East Africa	Nominated

== Pearl of Africa Music Awards ==
Year	Nominee / work	Award	Result
2006	Herself	Best Female Artist (Tanzania)	Won
2007	Herself	Best Female Artist (Tanzania)	Won
2008	Herself	Best Female Artist (Tanzania)	Won
2010	Herself	Best Female Artist (Tanzania)	Won
2011	Herself	Best Female Artist (Tanzania)	Won

== M-Nets Africa Awards ==
Year	Nominee / work	Award	Result
2001	Herself	Best Female Artist From Tanzania	Won

== Tanzania Youth Achievements Awards ==
Year	Nominee / work	Award	Result
2003	Usiusemee Moyo	Best RnB Song	Won

== BBC Radio Music Awards ==
Year	Nominee / work	Award	Result
2005	Song Of The Year	Distance	Won

== Uganda Divas Awards ==
Year	Nominee / work	Award	Result
2011	Herself	Best Female Artist in Tanzania	Won

== Tanzania People's Choice Awards ==
Year	Nominee / work	Award	Result
2014	Yahaya	Favorite Female Video	Won
2015	herself	Favorite Female Artist	Won

== Baab Kubwa Magazine Awards ==
Year	Nominee / work	Award	Result
2012	herself	Best Female Artist	Won

== Kisima Music Awards (Kenya) ==
Year	Nominee / work	Award	Result
2008	Anitha with Matonya	Song Of The Year	Won
2008	Anitha with Matonya	Collaboration of The Year	Won

== Kenya Bingwa Music Awards ==
Year	Nominee / work	Award	Result
2015	Yahaya	East African Song Of The Year	Won

== Clouds FM Awards ==
Year	Nominee / work	Award	Result
2000	Herself	Best Female Singer	Won
2011	Herself	Fiesta Hall Of Fame Award	Won

== Tanzania Music Awards ==
Year	Nominee / work	Award	Result
2002	herself	Best Female Artist	Won
2002	Machozi	Video Of The Year	Won
2004	Binti	Best RnB Album	Won
2007	Hawajui (with Mwana FA)	Best Collaboration	Won
2008	Herself	Best Female Artist	Won
2009	Anitha with Matonya	Best Collaboration	Won
2009	Anitha with Matonya	Song Of The Year	Won
2010	Herself	Best Female Singer	Won
2010	Herself	Song Writer Of the Year	Nominated
2010	Natamani Kuwa Malaika	Video Of the year	Nominated
2011	Herself	Best Female Artist	Won
2011	Herself	Best Female Singer	Nominated
2011	Nitafanya (With Kidumu)	East Africa Song Of the year	Won
2012	Herself	Best Female Artist	Won
2012	Wangu (Ft Mr Blue)	Best Zouk/Rhumba Song	Nominated
2012	Wangu (Ft Mr Blue)	Best Video	Nominated
2012	Wangu (Ft Mr Blue)	Best Collaboration	Nominated
2012	Kilimanjaro (Joh Makini Ft Gnako and Lady Jay Dee)	Best HipHop Song	Nominated
2013	Herself	Best Female Artist	Won
2014	Herself	Best Female Singer	Won
2014	Yahaya	Best Zouk/Rhumba Song	Won
2014	Yahaya	Song Of The Year	Nominated
2014	Yahaya	Video Of The Year	Nominated
2014	Joto Hasira (Ft Professor Jay)	Afro- Pop Song Of The Year	Nominated
2014	Joto Hasira (Ft Professor Jay)	Best Collaboration	Nominated
2015	Herself	Best Female Singer	Nominated
2015	Historia and Nasimama	Best Zouk/Rhumba Song	Nominated
2015	Forever ft Dabo	Best Collaboration	Nominated

== East Africa TV Awards ==
Year	Nominee / work	Award	Result
2016	Ndi Ndi Ndi	Best Female Artist	Won

== Africa Magazine Muzik Awards ==
Year	Nominee / work	Award	Result
2014	Herself	Best Female Artist East Africa	Won
2015	Herself	Best Humanitarian Artiste	Nominated
2017	Herself	Best Female Artist East Africa	Nominated

== All African Music Awards ==
Year	Nominee / work	Award	Result
2017	Sawa Na Wao	Best Female Artist In Eastern Africa	Nominated
