= Gigy Money =

Tanzanian socialite

- Born: Gift Stanford Joshua; July 18, 1998 (age 27); Temeke District, Dar es Salaam Region, Tanzania
- Genres: Bongo Flava, Amapiano
- Occupations: Singer internet personality video vixen social media influencer
- Instruments: Vocals
- Years active: 2016–present
- Labels: Independent

Gift Stanford Joshua (born July 18, 1998) known by her stage name Gigy Money is a Tanzanian singer, and internet personality. Gigy became a household after releasing Papa, a Bongo Flava song written by Marioo in 2017. Throughout her music career, Gigy Money has worked with different music heavyweights including Whozu, Tamimu, Rosa Ree, Lava Lava and more.

== Social controversies ==
Gigy Money has been accused, charged and sometimes banned for violating the operating procedure of art activities in Tanzania, using foul language and posting nude contents on her social media.

In 2019 the National Arts Council of Tanzania banned Gigy Money from doing any art activity inside and outside of Tanzania a for six months and to give a sum of one million Tanzanian shillings for the offense of humiliating his personality while performing in a dress that showed her body half naked at the concert that was broadcast live on Wasafi TV which also received a six months punishment from Tanzania Communications Regulatory Authority for the incident.

'The Wife material show'

Gigy Money was one of the contestants of a reality show Wife material season 2 organized by a Kenyan Comedian Eric Omondi, but she was forced out when she had a fight with a fellow contestant from Tanzania called Sumaiyah in a club during the show, she later on accused Omondi of forcing the contestants to fight to get the content.

== Relationships ==
Gigy Money alleged to have had a romantic relationship with Tanzanian singer Ali Kiba, who denied the allegations from the vixen. She once made a public statement on her desire to have children with singer Diamond Platnumz and a Tanzanian television host, Idris Sultan.

In 2020, Gigy Money had a violent fight with her then Nigerian boyfriend called nicknamed Hunchy Huncho who were separated after the incident. Gigy Money claimed to have a big number of abortions, still she managed to have a daughter she had with her ex boyfriend.

== Discography ==
Singles

- Pressure ft Whozu
- Saubona ft Rosa Ree
- Sheria ft Sanja Kong
- Chombeza ft Lava Lava
- Kiki ni Gigy ft Whozu, Sanja Kong
- Papa
- Malaya
- Sasambu
- Mimina
- Mashine
- Genge ft Sanja Kong
- Usinisumbue
- Changanya ft Tushynne
