= List of awards and nominations received by Ali Kiba =

Awards and nominations
Award	Wins	Nominations

Ali Kiba set a new record at the Tanzania Music Awards by winning 17 Awards after winning five awards at the 2022 Tanzania Music Awards that were held for the first time in April 2, 2022 after a six years hiatus.

== Awards ==
=== Tanzania Music Awards ===
Year	Nominee / work	Award	Result
2012	Dushelele	Best Zouk /Rhumba Song	Won
2012	Nai Nai with Ommy Dimpoz	Best Collaboration	Won
2014	Kidela with Abdu Kiba	Best Collaboration	Nominated
2015	Himself	Best Male Artist	Won
2015	Himself	Best Male Performer	Won
2015	Himself	Song Writer of the year	Won
2015	Mwana	Song of the Year	Won
2015	Mwana	Video of the year	Nominated
2015	Mwana	Afro Pop Song of the year	Won
2015	Kiboko Yangu With Mwana FA	Best Collaboration	Won

=== Watsup Music Awards ===
Year	Nominee / work	Award	Result
2016	Aje	Best African Rnb Video	Won
2016	Aje	Best East African Video	Won

=== BEFFTA Awards ===
Year	Nominee / work	Award	Result
2016	Aje	Best African Act	Won
2016	Aje	Video of the Year	Won

=== MTV Europe Music Awards ===
Year	Nominee / work	Award	Result
2016	Himself	Best International Act: Africa	Won

=== Nafca ===
Year	Nominee / work	Award	Result
2016	Himself	Favorite Artist	Won
2016	Mwana	Favorite Song	Won

=== East Africa TV Awards ===
Year	Nominee / work	Award	Result
2016	Aje	Best Male Artist	Won
2016	Aje	Song of the Year	Won
2016	Aje	Video of the Year	Won

=== ASFA Awards (Uganda) ===
Year	Nominee / work	Award	Result
2016	Aje	Most Stylish Artiste East Africa	Won
2016	Aje	Most Fashionable Music Video Africa	Won

=== Soundcity Awards ===
Year	Nominee / work	Award	Result
2016	Aje	Video of the Year	Won

=== TZ INSTA Awards 2016 ===
Year	Nominee / work	Award	Result
2016	Aje	Top Trending Song	Won

=== Best Celebrity Player Awards (Uganda) ===
Year	Nominee / work	Award	Result
2016	Himself	Best Celebrity Player	Won

=== WANNAMusic Awards 2016 (France) ===
Year	Nominee / work	Award	Result
2016	Aje	Best Male Artist	Nominated
2016	Aje	Best Collabo	Nominated
2016	Aje	People Choice	Won

== AFRIMA ==
Year	Nominee/ work	Award	Result
2019	Himself	Best Live Act	Won
2019	Himself	Best Male East Africa	Won
