= Damian Soul =

Tanzanian musician

Damian Innocent Mihayo (born September 21, 1987), professionally known as Damian Soul, is a Tanzanian singer, songwriter, composer, and guitarist.

== Early life and education ==
Damian Soul was born and raised in Sinza, Dar es Salaam, Tanzania, to Judge Innocent Mihayo. He has an older sister. He was introduced to various music his parents listened. His uncle's influence in hip-hop caused his interest in writing music.

He attended Eagle's Nest High School in Kampala, Uganda, where he co-founded the gospel music group Christ Like. During school holidays, he served as a lead singer and musical director at the Winners Chapel choir. Damian later pursued a certificate in music at Music May Day in Dar es Salaam.

== Career ==
Damian entered the music scene in 2011 with his debut single "Hakuna Matata," followed by "Taratibu" in 2012.

From 2012 to 2014, Damian was the lead singer and guitarist for Wakwetu Jazz Vibes, a band known for its fusion of jazz, soul, R&B, and traditional Tanzanian music. The group performed at international festivals such as the Jahazi Jazz Festival, Zanzibar International Film Festival and Sauti Za Busara.

After leaving Wakwetu Jazz Vibes in 2014, Damian resumed his solo career, releasing singles like "Ni Penzi" featuring Joh Makini. This track earned him a nomination for the best R&B song of the year at the Tanzania Music Awards.

In 2015, Damian participated in the Maisha Super Star competition, an East African talent search. Representing Tanzania, he emerged as one of the top finalists under the mentorship of rapper A.Y.

In January 2019, Damian released the EP Asante in collaboration with Barnaba, another prominent Tanzanian musician. The EP showcased his versatility and solidified his position in the East African music scene.

Damian is known for his live performances. He has performed at various international music festivals such as Sauti za Busara, Karibu Music Festival, and Jambo Festival.

== Impact and legacy ==
Damian Soul's music is characterized by soulful melodies and heartfelt lyrics, addressing themes of love, resilience and social consciousness.

== Discography ==
- "Hakuna Matata" (2011)
- "Taratibu" (2012)
- "Ni Penzi" (featuring Joh Makini)
- "Baraka" (featuring Joh Makini)
- "Tudumishe" (featuring G Nako)
- Asante EP (2019, in collaboration with Barnaba)
- Mapopo EP (2021), in collaboration with NHLONIPHO

== Awards and nominations ==
- Nomination for the best R&B song of the year at the Tanzania Music Awards (for "Ni Penzi")
