= Ray C =

Tanzanian musician

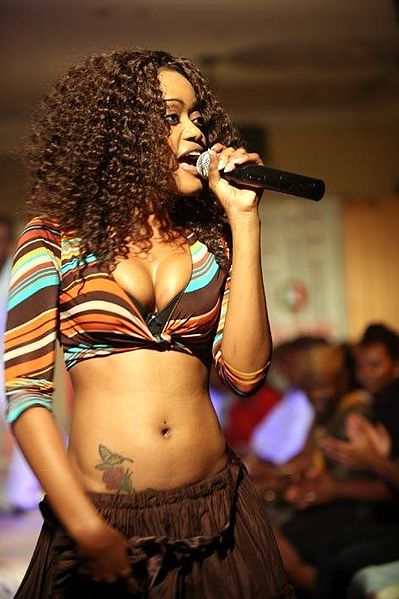
- Ray C

Background information
- Born: Rehema Chalamila; 15 May 1982 (age 43); Iringa, Tanzania
- Origin: Iringa
- Genres: Bongo Flava; R&B
- Occupation: Singer-songwriter
- Instruments: Vocals
- Years active: 2001–present

Rehema Chalamila (born 15 May 1982 in Iringa), popularly known by her stage name Ray C, is a musician from Tanzania. Her genre of music is Afro pop, specifically Bongo Flava.

== Biography ==
Before venturing into music, she worked as a presenter for the Dar es Salaam–based Clouds FM radio station. She released her debut album, Mapenzi Yangu, in 2003.

She has toured Kenya, Uganda, Tanzania, Burundi, Rwanda, Mozambique, China, the United Kingdom, Norway, Germany, the Netherlands, Greece, Sweden, the United States, Australia, Thailand, South Africa, India, Nigeria, and other countries.

== Discography ==
Albums:

- Mapenzi Yangu (2003)
- Na Wewe Milele (2004)
- Sogea Sogea (2006)
- Touch Me (2008)

== Awards ==
Won:

- 2004 Tanzania Music Awards - Best Female Artist
- 2004 Kisima Music Awards - Female Artist from Uganda & Tanzania
- 2007 Tanzania Music Awards - Best Female Artist

Nominated:

- 2006 Pearl of Africa Music Awards - Best Female (Tanzania)
- 2005 Channel O Music Awards - Best African East
- 2007 Pearl of Africa Music Awards - Best Female (Tanzania)
- 2008 Pearl of Africa Music Awards - Best Female (Tanzania)
- 2011 Tanzania Music Awards - Best Video, Best Song, Best Afro Pop Song and Best Collaboration Song ('Mama Ntilie' with Gelly wa Ryme & AT)
