= Atemi Oyungu =

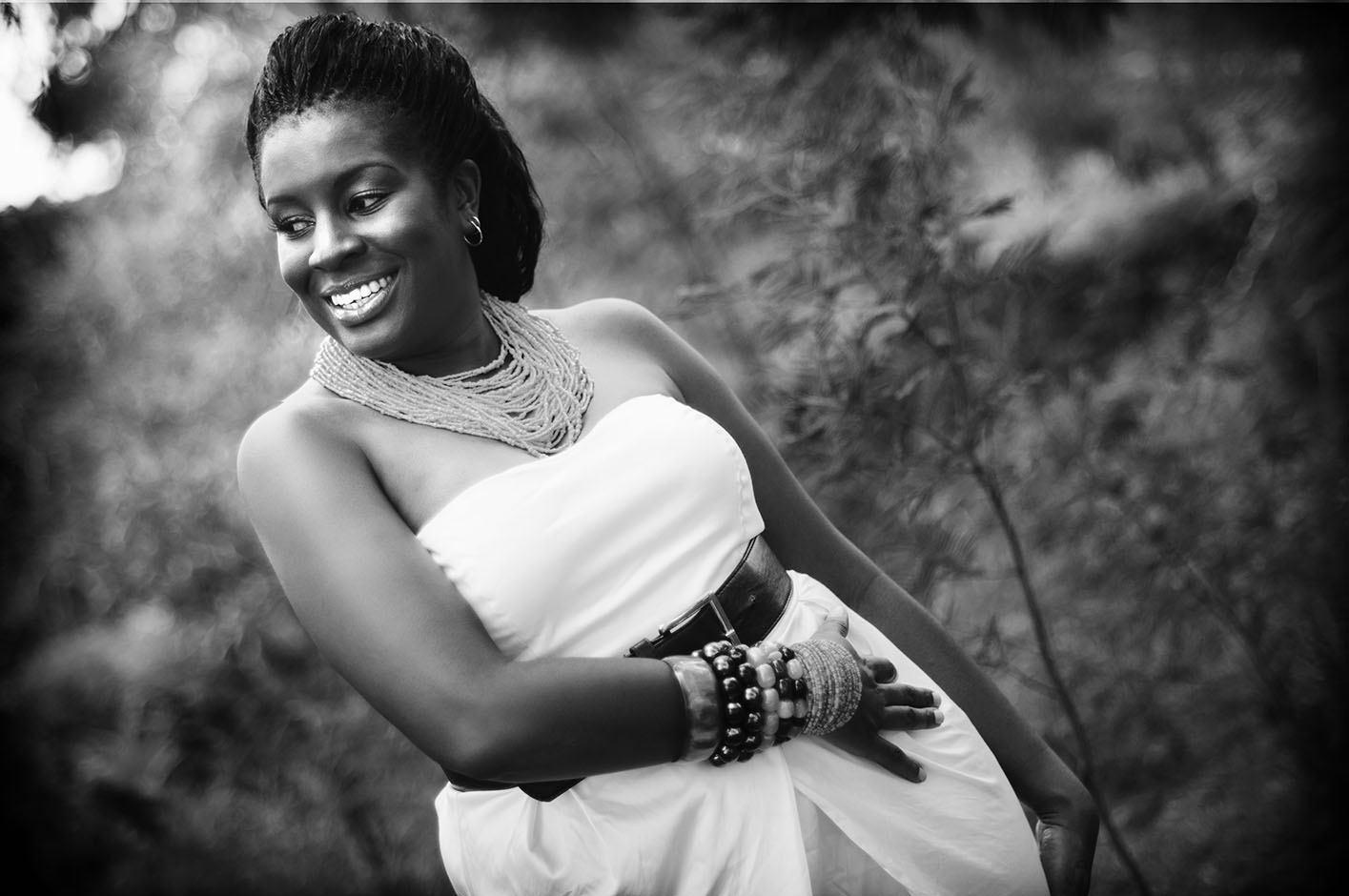

Background information
- Born: Carol Atemi Oyungu; Nairobi, Kenya
- Origin: Nairobi, Kenya
- Genres: Afro-soul; R&B; neo soul; soul; jazz
- Occupations: Singer; songwriter; actress
- Instruments: Vocals, piano
- Years active: 1996–present
- Labels: Gatwitch Records, Taurus Musik, Pine Creek Records
- Formerly of: Intu

Carol Atemi Oyungu is a Kenyan singer, songwriter and entertainer. She first made her mark by being in a girl band Intu until 2007 when they each decided to go solo and work on individual projects. In 2003, she joined Eric Wainaina, as an assistant vocal harmony provider for his band. Oyungu released her first single "Happy" in 2004 and her debut album Hatimaye in 2008, and her second studio album Manzili in 2013.

She hosted the sixth series of Africa Rising, a programme showcasing Africa's musical talent.

She has worked with various Kenyan musicians such as Nikki, Lady Jaydee, Chris Adwar and Delvin Mudigi.

== Early life and education ==
Atemi Oyungu was born and raised in Nairobi, Kenya.

== Career ==
Atemi started singing at the age of 10 at a junior choir in Nairobi Baptist church. At the end of secondary school, her friends and she formed a Capella group known as Thrown Together by Christ and later joined United States International University in 1996 where she formed a singing and dancing group known as Karisma. Karisma mainly performed at USIU related functions and concerts. The group stayed solid till 1998 when Atemi and one of Karisma group member, Natasha Gatabaki, formed a band INTU where they started working with music producer Tedd Josiah at the Sync Sound studios. Atemi has also worked as a Tusker Project Fame's sixth season music director. She worked with Tim Rimbui.

== Discography ==
- Hatimaye (2008)
- Manzili (2013)

=== Singles ===
| Year | Single | Director/producer | Album | Ref(s) |
|---|---|---|---|---|
| | "He is here" | | Hatimaye | |
| | "Speechless" | | Hatimaye | |
| | "Someday" | | Hatimaye | (Note: The song is created by Chris Adwar) |
| | "Sokoni" | | Hatimaye | |
| | "Domestics" (Atemi Oyungu, Dan 'chizi' Aceda, Kanji Mbugua and Aaron Rumbui) | | Hatimaye | |
| | "Color" | | Hatimaye | |
| | "Simama" | | Hatimaye | (Note: The song is written by Nina Ogot) |
| | "Imenibamba" (Atemi Oyungu and Eric Wainaina) | | Hatimaye | |
| 2013 | "Usijali" (Atemi Oyungu feat. Delvin Mudigi) | | Manzili | |
| 2013 | "Someday" (Atemi Oyungu and Chris Adwar) | | Manzili | |
| 2013 | "Nairobi" | | Manzili | |
| 2014 | "Sunny Day" | Mbithi Masya | Manzili | |
| 2014 | "Taxi" | | Manzili | |
| 2015 | "Moyo" (Atemi Oyungu feat. Lady Jaydee) | Rkay | TBA | |
| 2015 | "Bebi Bebi" | RKay | TBA | |
| 2018 | "Romantic" (Atemi Oyungu feat. Nameless) | Clarence Peters | | |

== Filmography ==
- Tinga Tinga Tales (2010)
- Lefty (2008)
- Sean (2008)
