= Darassa =

Tanzanian rapper

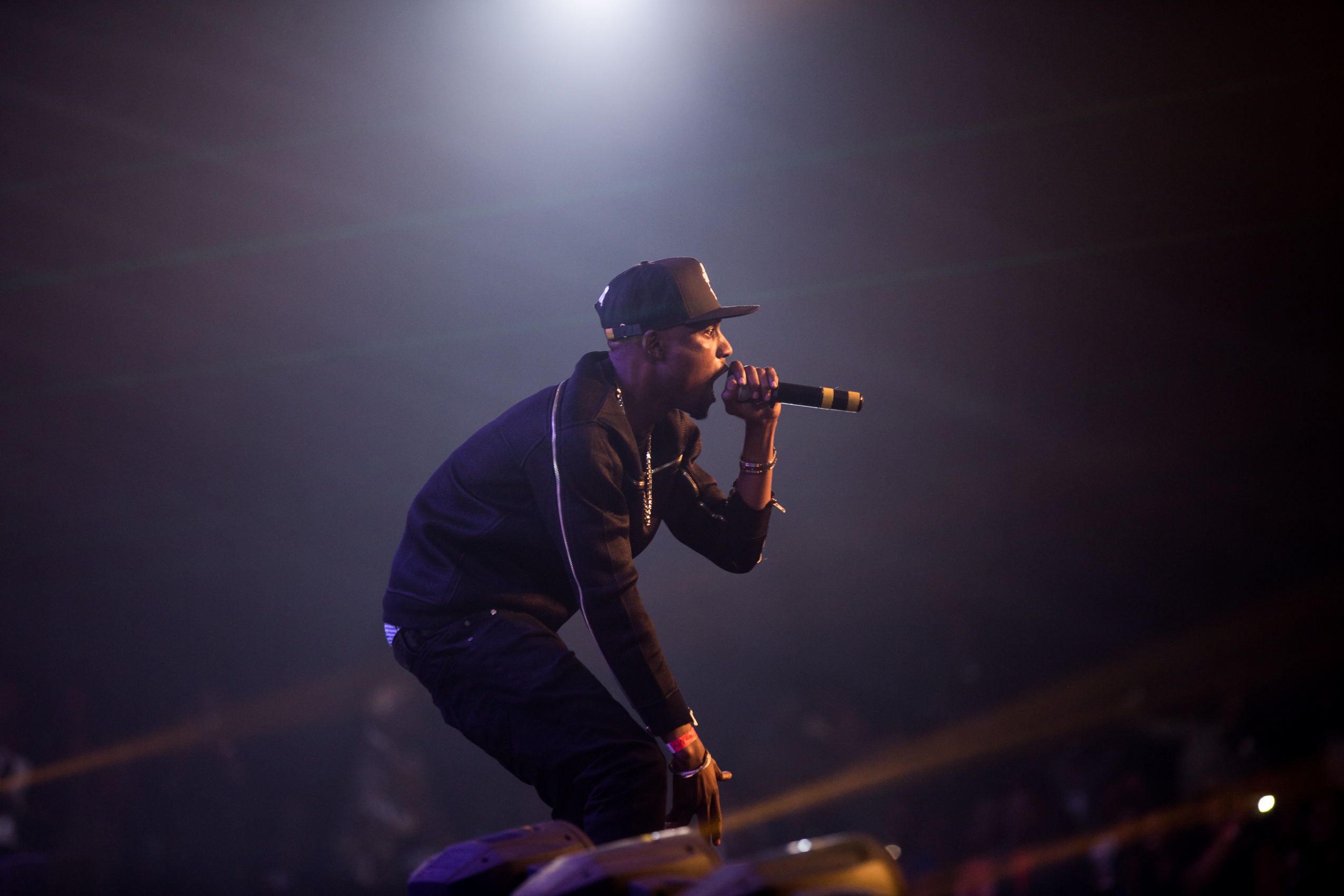

Background information
- Born: Shariff Thabit Ramadhan; 3 September 1988 (age 37)
- Genres: Hip hop; Afro pop
- Occupation: Singer • Rapper
- Instrument: Vocals
- Years active: 2014–present
- Labels: Classic Music Group (CMG) Management

Shariff Thabit Ramadhan (born 3 September 1988), better known by his stage name Darassa is a Tanzanian hip hop artist, recognized for his 2016 hit song 'Muziki', featuring Ben Pol.

== Career ==
Darassa began his music career in 2014 with the release of the song "Sikati Tamaa". He later took a break from the music scene before making a comeback in 2016 with the hit single Utanipenda, featuring Rich Mavoko. That same year, he released "Muziki", a collaboration with Ben Pol, which became a massive hit and received widespread airplay across East Africa.

Following the success of "Muziki", Darassa took another hiatus from the industry. He returned once again in 2018, continuing to build his presence in the East African music scene.

== Discography ==
Album

- 2020: Slave becomes a King

Singles

- Proud of you ft Ali Kiba
- I like it ft Sho Madjozi
- Waiter ft Mr Burudani
- Umeniroga ft Kassim Mganga
- Nimetumwa Pesa
- Loyalty ft Nandy & Marioo
- Size yao ft Dogo Janja
- Usiniletee shida ft Femi One
- Blessings ft Abbah & Mr. T Touch
- Hands Up ft Maua Sama
- Lock me down ft Jaiva
- My life ft Chibwa & Marisa
- Utanitoa roho
- Segedance ft Rich Mavoko
- Shemeji ft Barakah The Prince
- Hasso
- Nikiondoka
- Hater
- Nana ft G Boy
- Boss it ft Ben Pol

Other singles

- Leo ft Jux
- Muziki ft Ben Pol
- Kama Utanipenda ft Rich Mavoko
- Tumepoteza ft Maua Sama
- Achia njia
- Too much
- Chanda chema ft Marioo
- Tunaishi ft Ney wa Mitego
- Hoya Hayo ft Mr. Blue
- Inapepea ft Stamina
- Watch me ft Godzilla
- Shika ft Maua Sama
