= Aslay =

Tanzanian bongo flava musician

- Birth name: Aslay Isihaka Nassoro
- Also known as: Aslay; Dogo Aslay; Dingi mtoto
- Born: May 6, 1995 (age 29)
- Genres: Bongo flava; Afro pop
- Occupation: singer
- Years active: 2011–present
- Labels: Sony Music

Aslay Isihaka Nassoro (born May 6, 1995) known by his stage names Aslay, Dogo Aslay and Dingi mtoto is singer from Tanzania and a former lead vocalist for a music band, Yamoto.

== Career ==
He debuted his professional music career in 2011 after his song 'Naenda kusema' under 'Mkubwa na wanae' music label and management became a hitsong in East Africa.

In 2013, Aslay with three of his colleagues who were under one management, Mbosso, Beka Flavour and Enock Bella were partnered to form a band called Yamoto band that lasted for five years until the band disbanded in 2017. Both band members, including Aslay went on establishing solo careers.

In November 2022 Sony music disclosed that Aslay has joined the Sony East Africa and Sony Africa family. Earlier this year, right after Abigail Chams and Alikiba who were previously signed.

== Death allegations ==
On August 12, 2020, a YouTube video uploaded on Facebook showing a series of photos of crowds of people at a burial ceremony with a heading (translated from Swahili) "Aslay’s burial....thousands attend" accompanied with a voiceover in Kiswahili reports that the burial is of Tanzanian musician Aslay who died on August 3, 2020, in a car accident. The narrator says the burial was attended by thousands, including Aslay's producers and fellow artists from Dar es Salaam, Tanzania's major city, a claim he had to take social media to put an end to it.
