= Marioo =

Tanzanian bongo flava musician

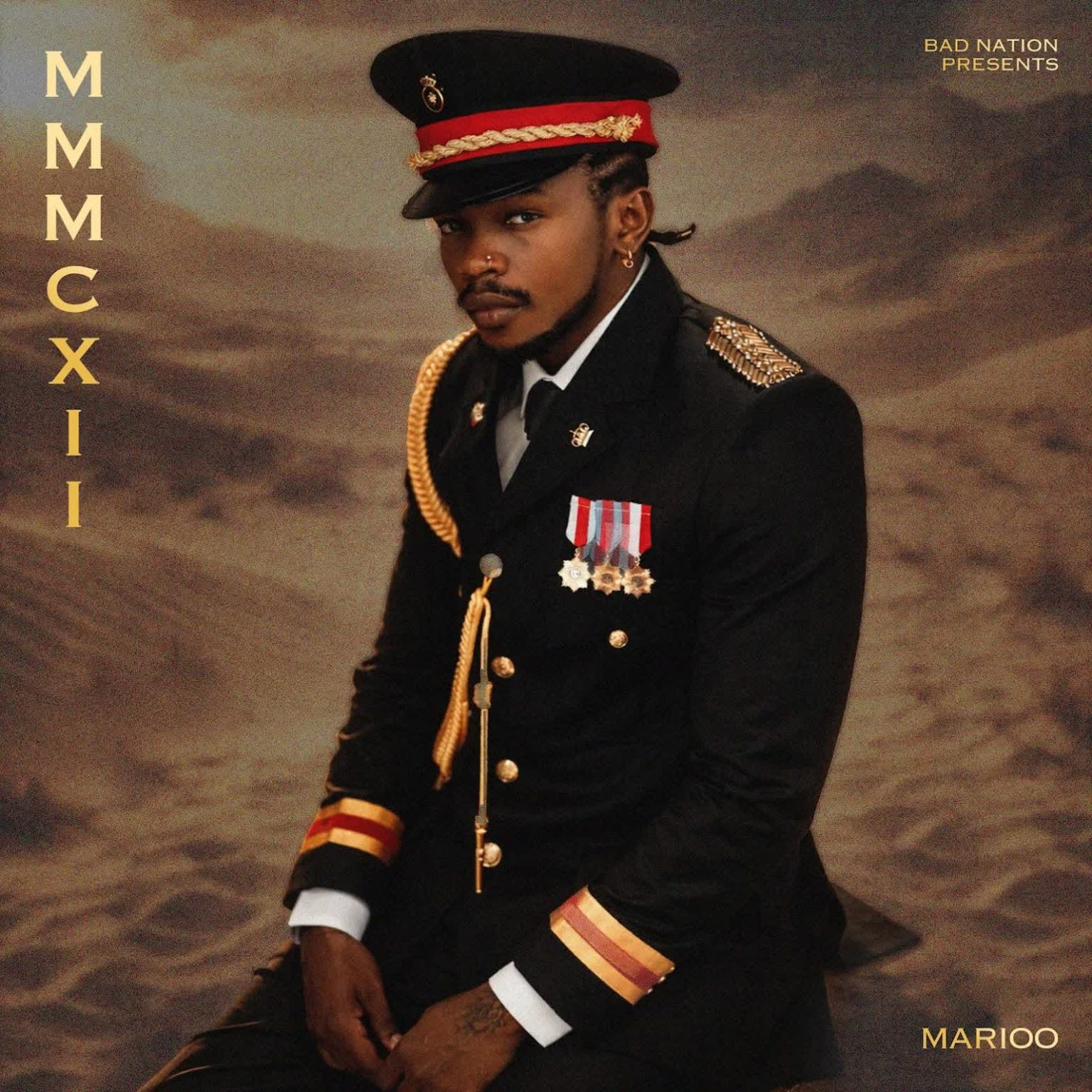
- Marioo MMMCXII EP Cover

Background information
- Also known as: Toto Badi
- Born: Omary Ally Mwanga; 31 December 1995 (age 30); Temeke District, Dar Es Salaam, Tanzania
- Origin: Dar es Salaam, Tanzania
- Genres: Bongo Flava; amapiano; afropop; Afro R&B
- Occupations: Singer; Songwriter; Music Producer; Entrepreneur; Businessman
- Instruments: vocals, keyboard
- Years active: 2015–present
- Label: Bad-Nation Limited
- Partner: Paulah Kajala (2023-present)

Omary Ally Mwanga, known professionally as Marioo (born 31 December 1995), is a Tanzanian singer, songwriter, and music producer. He is also the founder and CEO of his own record label, Bad Nation. He is known for songs such as "Tete", "Dunia", and "Nairobi" (featuring Kenyan artist Bien of Sauti Sol), which recorded high streaming numbers across major digital platforms in Tanzania and Kenya, and was associated with Marioo's increased visibility in the East African music scene.

== Life and career ==
=== Early life ===
Omary Mwanga was born in Temeke Dar es Salaam to Ndengereko parents from Pwani region of Tanzania. He is the youngest of three children; his late father worked as a public transport conductor (kondakta), and his mother worked at a factory in Vingunguti. While he was still a young child, his parents sent him to live with his grandmother in Kibiti, Rufiji, located in Pwani region.

Marioo attended primary school and began his secondary education in Kibiti, but due to various life challenges, he dropped out during his first year (Form One). Following his departure from school, he returned to Temeke, Dar es Salaam, to live with his mother again. Marioo worked manual jobs to earn a living, including working at a local informal food stall (mama ntilie) and as a motor vehicle mechanic at his uncle's garage before deciding to pursue a career in music.

=== Early career ===
After an extended period of struggling to establish himself in the music industry, Marioo had his breakthrough in 2016 when his cover of Lameck Ditto's "Moyo Sukuma Damu" caught the attention of producer Emma the Boy. The producer recommended him to the founder of the Tanzania House of Talent (THT) and the late Director of Production at Clouds Media, Ruge Mutahaba, allowing him to successfully join the institution. While training at THT, he networked with already established artists and began composing music for them. Marioo has written numerous hit records for mainstream Tanzanian artists, including "Bado" by Mwasiti, "Wasikudanganye" by Nandy, "Banana" by Dogo Janja, "Mchakamchaka" by Shilole, "Nampa Papa" by Gigy Money, "Pambe" by Christian Bella, and "Nabembea" by Ditto.

The song "Dar Kugumu", which captures the real-life struggles of hustling in Dar es Salaam was Marioo's breakout debut single in 2018. Upon its release, the track was well-received by fans and made him a household name in Tanzania.

Marioo went on to release other successful Bongo Flava singles such as "Raha", "Inatosha", "Asante", "For You", "Anyinya", "Chibonge", and "Ya Uchungu".

In 2020, Marioo released his smash hit "Mama Amina", which was an Amapiano song infused with some elements of Bongo Flava. The song was ranked number 11 on the list of best Tanzanian songs of the decade ranging from 2012 to 2022. His next Amapiano releases such as "Dear Ex", "Beer Tamu" and "Lonely" have marked his status as the king of Swahili Amapiano.

In December 2021, Marioo released "Mi Amor" featuring Jovial from Kenya. The song also became a crossover hit with its visuals becoming the second most watched Tanzanian music video on Youtube in 2022. Rolling Stone magazine ranked Marioo number 39 on its 40 Afropop songs of 2022.

In 2022, Marioo won 3 Tanzania Music Awards from 7 nominations including Best Bongo Flava Song and Best Male Bongo Flava Artist.

Marioo released his debut album The Kid You Know on 9 December 2022. The 17 track album saw Marioo working with different music heavyweights such as Rayvanny, Tyla, Harmonize, and Ali Kiba.

NotJustOk's and Tanzanian music journalist, Charles Maganga praised The Kid You Know by stating that the album has "established Marioo as a mega Bongo Fleva star" and acclaimed Marioo's versatility as "different musical styles such as Amapiano, Afrobeats, and R&B while remaining true to his Bongo Fleva".

In May 2023, Marioo released The deluxe edition of The Kid You Know with three additional singles, "Sing", "Tomorrow", and "Tunamjua".

In Spotify Wrapped 2024, Marioo emerged as the most listened to artist in Tanzania, outranking major regional stars. Additionally, his hit song "Hakuna Matata" claimed the top spot as the most streamed local track of the year across the country.

On 29 May 2026, Marioo released his debut Extended Play (EP) titled MMMCXII, a title derived from Roman numerals representing his date of birth (31 December). The EP marks a transition into a broader "Global African Sound", blending traditional Bongo Flava with Afrobeats, Afro-fusion, Francophone melodies, and 3-step rhythms.

== Artistry ==
=== Influences ===
Marioo considers Diamond Platnumz his ultimate musical and career role model, though he also deeply respects and draws inspiration from prominent Bongo Flava figures Ali Kiba and Rich Mavoko. He credits Diamond with igniting his passion for music and cites admiration for how he connects with his fanbase and works to help others succeed.

=== Musical style ===
Marioo's musical style is primarily rooted in Bongo Flava, pop and Afro-R&B, while also incorporating elements of Amapiano and Afropop. Expanding beyond traditional Bongo Flava arrangements, he integrates contemporary R&B beats with Swahili harmonies, a fusion underpinning his romantic ballads such as "Naogopa" and "Mi Amor". He has also been instrumental in popularizing "Bongopiano", a sub-genre that merges South African Amapiano log drums with Tanzania melodic sensibilities, prominently showcased in dance-floor tracks like "Beer Tamu" and "Mama Amina". His recent 2026 output fully demonstrates his stylistic breadth: "Mombasa" channels percussive Bongo Flava; "Pombe", "Sugar 2.0", and "Priority" expand on the melodic Bongopiano and Afro-R&B framework; "Watu" delves into high-tempo Single street-pop while "Doucument" introduces Congolese Afro-Rumba guitar textures. Collectively, these recent releases cement his status as an increasingly versatile and dynamic force in East African contemporary pop.

== Personal life ==
Marioo is a Muslim by faith. In 2023, Marioo began dating influencer Paulah Kajala, the daughter of Bongo Movies actress Kajala Masanja and veteran music producer P-Funk Majani.

The couple welcomed their first child, a daughter named Princess Amarah (Amara), on 3 May 2024.

== Other ventures ==
=== Entrepreneurship ===
In 2019, Marioo established Bad Nation as a multimedia company, which later transitioned into a full record label with the official signing of its first artist, Stans, on 29 August 2024.

=== Endorsements and partnerships ===
In February 2025, Marioo was officially announced as the national brand ambassador for the National Lottery of Tanzania (Bahati Nasibu ya Taifa), a campaign run by ITHUBA Tanzania aimed at promoting responsible gaming and empowering citizens.

== Discography ==
=== Studio albums ===
Title	Album details
The Kid You Know	Released: 9 December 2022; Label: Bad Nation / Ziiki Media; Formats: Digital download, streaming
The Godson	Released: 29 November 2024; Label: Bad Nation; Formats: Digital download, streaming

=== Extended plays ===
Title	EP details
MMMCXII	Released: 29 May 2026; Label: Bad Nation; Formats: Digital download, streaming

=== Track listings ===
==== The Kid You Know (2022) ====
No.	Title	Length
1.	"My Life"	3:12
2.	"Siwezi"	3:24
3.	"Lonely" (with Abbah)	3:45
4.	"Mapenzi"	2:58
5.	"Only You" (featuring Jux)	3:31
6.	"Hapana"	3:05
7.	"Overdose" (featuring Ladipoe)	3:18
8.	"Amawele" (with Tyla and Ch'cco)	4:02
9.	"Mi Amor" (featuring Jovial)	3:40
10.	"I Miss" (featuring Alikiba)	3:52
11.	"Laga Laga" (featuring Dunnie)	2:48
12.	"Naogopa" (featuring Harmonize)	3:36
13.	"Anisamehe" (featuring Rayvanny)	3:21
14.	"Djudju" (featuring Fik Fameica)	2:55
15.	"Mwagia Ndani" (with Robot Boii and Native Deep featuring Tin Starkid)	4:10
16.	"Dear Ex"	2:45
17.	"Mi Amor (Remix)" (with Gaz Mawete and Jeeba)	3:50
Total length:		56:12

==== The Godson (2024) ====
No.	Title	Length
1.	"Alhamdulillah"	3:04
2.	"My Daughter"	2:54
3.	"Sober" (featuring Alikiba)	3:18
4.	"Nairobi" (featuring Bien)	4:18
5.	"Dar es Salaam"	2:48
6.	"Happiness" (featuring Kenny Sol)	3:24
7.	"Salioo"	3:14
8.	"Wangu" (featuring Harmonize)	3:36
9.	"My Eyes" (featuring Patoranking)	3:11
10.	"Pini" (featuring Aslay)	2:54
11.	"Njozi" (featuring Element EleéeH)	2:41
12.	"No One" (featuring King Promise)	3:26
13.	"High" (featuring Joshua Baraka)	3:08
14.	"Why"	2:59
15.	"Hakuna Matata"	3:06
16.	"UNANCHEKESHA (Move On)"	2:53
17.	"Sawa"	3:05
Total length:		55:19

==== MMMCXII (2026) ====
No.	Title	Length
1.	"Mombasa"	2:43
2.	"Priority" (with Bruce Melodie)	3:31
3.	"Doucement" (with Ya Levis)	2:50
4.	"UA" (with Sofiya Nzau)	3:21
5.	"SUGAR"	2:22
6.	"Sugar (Remix)" (featuring Chella)	2:41
7.	"Watu" (with D Voice)	2:23
8.	"Pombe I" (with Harmonize)	2:13
9.	"POMBE II (We Live Once)" (with BabyDaiz)	2:44
Total length:		24:48

== Awards and nominations ==
Year	Award Ceremony	Category	Nominated work	Result	Ref.
2020	Sound City MVP Awards	Best New MVP	Individual	Nominated	
2021	All Africa Music Awards	Best Newcomer	Individual	Nominated	
2021	Swahili Fashion Awards	Stylish Music Video of the Year	"Beer Tamu"	Won	
2022	Tanzania Music Awards	Song, bongo flava	"Beer Tamu"	Won	
2022	Tanzania Music Awards	Collaboration, African	"Mi Amor"	Nominated	
2022	Tanzania Music Awards	Lyricist	"Loyalty"	Won	
2022	Tanzania Music Awards	Composer, melody	"Mi Amor"	Nominated	
2022	Tanzania Music Awards	Artist, bongo flava (male)	Individual	Won	
2023	Tanzania Music Awards	Best Male Artist of the Year	Himself	Nominated	
2023	Tanzania Music Awards	Best Male Bongo Fleva Singer of the Year	Himself	Nominated	
2023	Tanzania Music Awards	Best Album of the Year	The Kid You Know	Nominated	
2023	Tanzania Music Awards	Best Bongo Fleva Song of the Year	"Dear Ex"	Nominated	
2023	Tanzania Music Awards	Best Music Video of the Year	"Dear Ex"	Nominated	
2023	Tanzania Music Awards	Best Collaboration Song of the Year	"Naogopa" (featuring Harmonize)	Nominated	
2024	Tanzania Music Awards	Best Male Artist (Bongo Flava)	Individual	Won	
2024	Tanzania Music Awards	Best Songwriter of the Year	Individual	Won	
2024	Audiomack Tanzania Awards	Most Streamed Artist of the Year	Individual	Won	
2025	Trace Awards	Best Artist - Eastern Africa	Individual	Nominated	
2025	Africa Arts Entertainment Awards (EAEA)	Best East African Male Artist	Individual	Nominated	
2025	IAEA (Iconic & Anthemic) Awards	Iconic Anthemic Hit	"Nairobi"	Nominated	
2025	IAEA (Iconic & Anthemic) Awards	Iconic Album	The God Son	Nominated	
2025	IAEA (Iconic & Anthemic) Awards	Iconic Collaboration	"Nairobi"	Nominated	
2026	AFRIMMA	Best East African Artist	Individual	Pending	

=== Critical reception and milestones ===
In 2022, Rolling Stone magazine ranked Marioo's hit single "Mi Amor" at number 39 on its global list of the "40 Best Afropop Songs of 2022".
