= Nadia Mukami =

Kenyan singer-songwriter (born 1996)

- Born: 9 November 1996 (age 29); Nairobi, Kenya
- Genres: Afro-pop
- Occupations: Singer; Songwriter
- Instrument: Vocals
- Years active: 2017–present
- Label: Sevens Creative Hub

Nadia Mukami (born on 9 November 1996) is a Kenyan singer-songwriter known for her hit singles "Si Rahisi", and "Radio Love," featuring Arrow Bwoy. She released her debut EP, African Popstar, in October 2020. She is the founder of the Kenyan record label "Sevens Creative Hub".

== Early life and education ==
Nadia Mukami was born in Pumwani Hospital in Nairobi, Kenya, on 9th November 1996. She went to Kari Mwailu Primary School, completed her primary education in 2009. She then attended Mount Laverna School in Kasarani, Nairobi. Nadia later joined Maseno University and pursued a degree in BBA, specializing in Finance.

== Music career ==
Nadia wrote and recorded her first song "Barua Ya Siri," in 2015. Her second song "Kesi", released in 2017, gained popularity and led to performances at festivals such as the Blaze The Nile Festival and The Luo Festival.

In February 2019, Nadia released the song "Radio Love" featuring Arrow Bwoy, which marked her breakthrough. The song received significant attention from the Kenyan media and was played in many radio and TV stations in the region.

In 2019, Nadia parted ways with her management, Hailemind Entertainment. That same year, "Radio Love" won two awards at the Pulse Music Video Awards (PMVA). She also represented Kenya at Coke Studio Africa in 2019.

In early 2020, Nadia released "Nitekenye" featuring Kenyan Gengetone musical group "Sailors". Her debut EP was later released in October 2020. The lead single "Jipe" featuring Tanzanian singer Marioo was released in March 2020. The EP featured Khaligraph Jones, Maua Sama, Fena Gitu, DJ Joe Mfalme, Sanaipei Tande, as well as Nigeria's Orezi, Zimbabwe's Tamy Moyo, and Lioness Nam from Namibia. She was also nominated for the HiPipo awards in 2020.

In 2021, Nadia received her first nomination for the MTV Africa Music Awards (MAMA).

In 2022, after concluding an ostentatious pregnancy journey, Nadia Mukami dropped a four-track track EP named "Bundle of Joy" featuring Iyanii, Latinoh, and her better half Arrow Boy. "I worked on the project my whole pregnancy and I poured my heart into it. This project is my favorite piece of art," Mukami shared the expressive significance of the new artwork on her Instagram page.

In September 2023, Nadia Mukami won the title of Best Female Artist in East Africa at the African Muzik Magazine Awards (AFRIMMAs), which took place in Dallas, Texas. Her importance in the East African music industry is highlighted by this prize, as she distinguished herself among noteworthy nominees like Zuchu, Maua Sama, Nandy, Fena Gitu, Spice Diana, Hewan Gebrewold, and Nikita Kering.

== Discography ==
Singles

Title	Year of Release
Kesi	2017
Si Rahisi	2018
African Lover	2018
Yule Yule	2018
Radio Love ft. Arrow Bwoy	2019
Lola ft. Masauti	2019
Ikamate Hiyo	2019
Maombi	2019
Jipe ft. Marioo	2020
Million Dollar	2020
Tesa ft Khaligraph Jones & Fena Gitu	2020
Zungushie ft. Maua Sama	2020
Dozele ft. Orezi & Joe Mfalme	2020
Criminal Lover	2020
Wangu ft Sanaipei Tande	2020
Kolo ft Otile Brown	2021
Million Dollar (Remix) ft. Lioness Nam & Tamy Moyo	2021

== Awards ==
Winner, Pulse Music Video Awards, Radio Love "Female Video of the Year" (2019)

Nominee, HiPipo Awards, Radio Love "Best Kenyan Act" (2020)

Nominee, MTV Africa Music Awards, "Best Fanbase Award" (2021)

Winner, Zuri Awards, Finance Category (2021)
