= Nay Wa Mitego =

Tanzanian Rapper and Activist

- Also known as: Nay Wa Mitego; Mr. Nay; TrueBoy; Raisi wa kitaa
- Born: Emmanuel Elibariki Munisi; June 9, 1986 (age 39); Manzese, Dar es salaam
- Genres: Bongo flava; Hip Hop
- Occupation: musician
- Years active: 2009–present

Emmanuel Elibariki Munisi (born June 9, 1986) known by his stage names Nay Wa Mitego, Mr. Nay and NayTrueboy is a Tanzanian rapper, activist and Bongoflava artist.

== Career ==
Nay's music career started back in the 90s as a 10 years old boy when he self-released the Demo single Dala Dala in 1996. He released his debut first studio song subjected in 2000 through Sound Crafter Records. He is largely known for his infamous fame singles Ninakupenda and Itafahamika released in 2006 that boosted his career to become one of the top Tanzanian rappers.

Nay has become known for hit singles like Salamu Zao and Saka Hela.

=== Activism ===
Nay Wa Mitego has used his platform to advocate for social justice and speak out against government oppression.

Throughout his career, Nay Wa Mitego has tackled various societal issues through his music, addressing topics such as corruption, poverty, and political repression. His songs often serve as a voice for the marginalized and oppressed, resonating with audiences across Tanzania and beyond. However, Nay Wa Mitego's activism has not come without consequences. In 2017, he faced significant backlash from Tanzanian authorities after releasing the song "Wapo" (They Exist), which criticized the government's handling of social issues. The song was subsequently banned by the Tanzanian government, and Nay Wa Mitego was temporarily detained for questioning.

In 'Amkeni,' a 2023 song, Nay wa Mitego boldly called out the government, describing it as corrupt and accusing the President of merely putting up billboards to portray herself as hardworking while allegedly failing to deliver on her promises.

In 2024, Nay Wa Mitego addressed speculation surrounding his latest song, "Wapi Huko," which delves into societal issues and describes a visit to a country he cryptically refers to as 'abroad,' vividly portraying its high cost of living, expensive food, cheap alcohol, and daytime power outages' impact on the working population.

Despite the risks, Nay Wa Mitego has stated his intention to continue to produce music that challenges the status quo.

== Awards and nominations ==
Nay Wa Mitego awards and nominations
Awards and nominations
| Award | Wins | Nominations |

Totals (Note: Certain award groups do not simply award one winner. They acknowledge several different recipients, have runners-up, and have third place. Since this is a specific recognition and is different from losing an award, runner-up mentions are considered wins in this award tally. For simplification and to avoid errors, each award in this list has been presumed to have had a prior nomination.)
- Wins: 1
- Nominations: 3

Tanzania Music Awards

| Year | Nominee / work | Award | Result |
|---|---|---|---|
| 2012 | Nasema nao | Best Hip hop song | Won |
| 2022 | Himself | Best Hip hop male artist | Nominated |

All Africa Music Awards 2022

| Year | Nominee / work | Award | Result |
|---|---|---|---|
| 2022 | Rais wa kitaa | Best African Rapper/Lyricist | Nominated |

Accountability Music Awards

| Year | Nominee / work | Award | Result |
|---|---|---|---|
| 2021 | Rais wa kitaa | Best accountability song of the year | Nominated |

== Discography ==
Albums and EPs

- Muziki gani, 2015
- Ukweli wa moyo, 2015 (Extended Playlist)
- Mr. Ney, 2021 (Extended Playlist)
- Rais wa kitaa, 2022

Singles

- Muziki gani featuring Diamond Platnumz
- Hello
- Mama
- Jiangalie
- Sijalewa
- Sina Muda
- Makuzi
- Pale Kati Patamu
- Wapo
- Mungu Anakuona
- Amkeni
