= Zenji flava =

Music genre

Zenji flava is a common nickname for Zanzibari hip hop, a genre that began to develop in the 1990s. The name is made of zenji, which is slang for "Zanzibar", and flava, which is a corruption of "flavour", thus meaning "of Zanzibari taste". As with bongo flava, i.e., Tanzanian mainland's hip hop, zenji flava is usually sung in swahili; the main difference between the two subgenres is that Zanzibari hip hop also reflects some influence of taarab, and thus indirectly of Arab music and Indian music. Notable zenji flava artists include Ali Haji. As Zenji flavour goes on it find itself as a sub part of Bongo flava as it has influence from the young generation of artists who want to cop with Bongo flava. like Offside trick, 2 berry now is separated to form two solo artists（Berry black and Berry white）, Wazenji kijiwe and Shaka zulu, others are East connection which was made up with almost seven groups of artist including Offside trick Brooklyn, Four nature, Jumbo camp, Queen love, and K jam. It was in this time that Zenji flava was modernized with rapid growth in the number of artists.
