= Barnaba Classic =

Tanzanian singer-songwriter

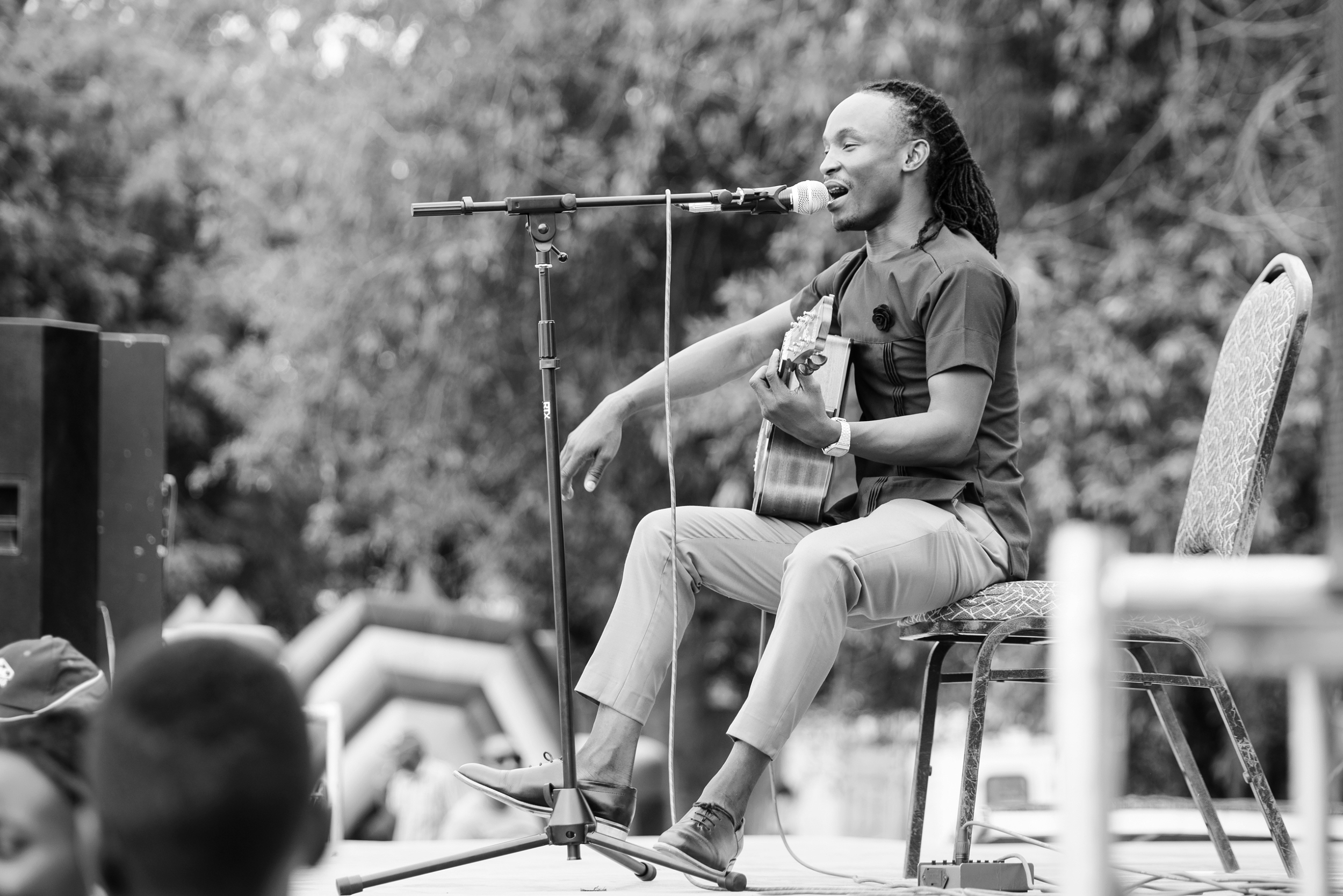

Background information
- Born: Elias Barnabas Inyasi; Kilimanjaro Region, Tanzania
- Genres: Bongo flava; Afro-pop; Afrobeats
- Occupations: Singer; songwriter; performer
- Instruments: rhythm guitar; piano; bass guitar
- Years active: 2000–present

Elias Barnabas Inyasi who is predominantly known by his stage names, Barnaba Classic and Barnaba boy is a singer, songwriter and performer from Tanzania.

== Career ==
Barnaba began his musical career from training for vocals in his local church choir in 2000. He was scouted and later joined the Tanzanian House of Talent (THT) at the age of 17. His breakthrough song was "Baby I Love You" released in 2007. In 2022 he released a 19-song album featuring 20 musicians from East Africa.

Music In Africa's and Tanzanian Music Journalist, Charles Maganga praised Love Sounds different Album by naming the 18-track body of work as "Barnaba Classic's most celebrated body of work to date"

== Awards and nominations ==
Tanzania Music Awards

Year	Nominee / work	Award	Result
2011	Nabembelezwa	Best Zouk/Rhumba song	Won
2012	Himself	Best male artist	Won

== Discography ==
Year	Album name	Single
2022	Love sounds different	Hadithi ft Diamond Platnumz; Sijiwexi ft Jux; Cheketua ft Alikiba; Tamu ft Nandy (singer); Marry me ft. Marioo; Mzuri ft. Rayvanny; Warohoni ft. Young Lunya; Hunitaki ft. Mbosso; One more time ft. Khaligraph Jones; Only you ft. Jay melody; Hata suelewi ft. Saraphina; Halichachi ft. Khadija Kopa; I miss you ft. Lady Jaydee; Ongeza ft. Lody music; Tamba ft. Kusah; Ade ft. Dayoo; Sayuni ft. Joel Lwaga; She got one ft. Platform, Ziddy, Mulla; Bolingo nangai
