= Ben Pol =

- Born: Benard Paul Mnyang'anga; September 8, 1989 (age 37); Vingunguti, Dar es salaam, Tanzania
- Origin: Dodoma
- Genre: Bongo Flava Afrobeats RnB
- Occupation: Singer Songwriter
- Instrument: Vocals
- Years active: 2009 - present
- Label: Independent

Benard Michael Paul Mnyang'anga, better known by his stage name Ben Pol, is a Tanzanian singer and songwriter from Dar es salaam, Tanzania. On January 5, 2024, Ben Pol released his highly anticipated third album 'Flamingo', which Simulizi Na Sauti's music critic, Enky Frank described the album as an educational package for love, lifestyle and daily activities

== Music career ==
His previous release “Ningefanyaje”, featured Kenyan artist Avril and ranked #1 on Soundcity TV, Top 10 East and Africa Rox Countdown. He later released his hit song Sophia in 2015. His other well-known hits include “Unanichora” ft. Joh Makini”, “Jikubali”, “Pete”, “Maneno”, “Samboira” and “Nikikupata”. In 2015 Ben Pol participated in Coke Studio Africa S3 alongside 25 top artists including Yemi Alade, Sauti Sol and Flavour. Dubbed the “Tanzania R&B prodigy” he partnered with Kenyan rapper Wangechi. Ben Pol has collaborated with Amos and Josh, Nameless, Avril, the King Kaka, Chidinma, Baraka Da Prince, Jux, Joh Makini, Gnako, Maua Sama and Fid Q in Tanzania. He is the winner of three Tanzania Music Awards from 2011 to 2013, with two AFRIMA nominations in 2015 and one in 2014.

Ben Pol collaborated with Mr Eazi on the song Phone released in 2017. In February 2017 Ben Pol was mentioned by MTV Base Africa through their platforms as one of the Artists to watch in the year 2017. Ben Pol did another collaboration with Darassa in the song called Muziki; the song was released in December 2016. The song was nominated in Afrima Awards for the categories of Song of the year and Best collaboration in Africa. He was also nominated at the EATV Awards for the Best male artist and Song of the year for his hit "Moyo mashine".

== Ambassador ==
Ben Pol is one of the celebrity ambassadors for WildAid.

== Awards and nominations ==
=== Tanzania Music Awards ===
Year	Nominee / work	Award	Result
2011	Nikikupata	Best R&B Song	Won
2012	My Number One Fan	Best R&B Song	Won
2013	Ben Pol	Best R&B Song	Nominated
2013	Ben Pol	Best Bongo Flava Act	Nominated
2013	Ben Pol	Best Male Artist	Nominated
2013	Ben Pol	Song Of The Year	Nominated
2013	Ben Pol	Best Song Writer	Won
2014	Ben Pol	Best R&B Song	Nominated
2014	Ben Pol	Best Male Artist	Nominated
2014	Ben Pol	Best Song Writer	Nominated
2015	Ben Pol	Best R&B Song	Nominated
2015	Ben Pol	Best Male Singer	Nominated

=== Under 30 Youth Awards 2013 ===
Year	Nominee / work	Award	Result
2013	Ben Pol	Best Male Vocalist Of The Year	Won

=== Africa Music Magazine Awards 2014 ===
Year	Nominee / work	Award	Result
2014	Ben Pol	Best East African Male Singer	Nominated

=== All Africa Music Awards Awards 2015 ===
Year	Nominee / work	Award	Result
2015	Ben Pol	Best African R&B & Soul	Nominated
2015	Ben Pol	Most Promising Artiste in Africa	Nominated

=== EATV Awards 2016 ===
Year	Nominee / work	Award	Result
2016	Ben Pol	Best Male Artist	Nominated
2016	Ben Pol	Song Of The Year	Nominated

== Discography ==
=== Singles ===
Title
Mwambie, Ben Pol & Baraka Da Prince ft. Mr Blue
Nakuchana, Ben pol & Jux
Moyo Mashine
Ningfanyaje Remix: Ben Pol, VJ Adams & G Nako
Ningefanyaje ft. Avril & Rossie M.
Sophia
Unanichora ft. Joh Makini
Jikubali
Maneno
Wapo

=== Best of ben pol (2017) album ===
Title
Nikikupata Acoustic
Kidume ft Chidnma
Maneno
Pete 2 ft Rama Dee
Yatakwisha ft Linah
Moyo Mashine
Jikubali
Number One Fan
Tatu ft Darasa
Maboma
Samboira
Phone ft Mr Eazi
Natuliza Ball
Best of Ben Pol

=== Ben pol (2014) album ===
Title
Pete
Tulia Kwangu
Wa Ubani
Yatakwisha
Afro
Samboira Remix
Gusa
Majonzi
Upendo

=== Maboma (2012) album ===
Title
Nikikupata
Maneno
Number One Fan
Naringa
Maumivu
Maumivu Remix
Maboma
I'm high
Pata Raha

=== Collaborations ===
Title
Kupe, Amos & Josh (KENYA)
Shilingi, Stereo
Diamond Girl, Young Suma
Do it, Young Dee
Bendera Chuma, FidQ
This Love, Maua Sama
Fununu, Young Dee
Sitaki Kazi, Nicki Wa Pili & Gnako
Baba La Baba, Lord Eyez
Nisamehe, Chidi Benz
Anaishi Nae, Belle 9
Sikati Tamaa, Darasa
Ms BUSINESS, Izzo Business & AY
Phone feat. Mr Eazi (Nigeria)

== Movies ==
Year	Film	Role	Notes/Cast
2014	Sunshine	Rufu	With Bi Kiroboto
