= Maua Sama =

- Born: August 27, 1990 (age 36); Tanzania
- Origin: Moshi, Kilimanjaro, Tanzania
- Genre: Bongo Flava
- Occupations: Musician, Songwriter, Actress, Singer
- Instrument: Vocal
- Years active: 2013–present

Maua Sama (born August 27, 1990) is a Tanzanian singer and songwriter. She is known for her song "Iokote" (2018).

== Early life and education ==
Maua Sama was born on August 27, 1990, in Tanzania. She completed her studies before launching her professional music career.

== Career ==
Maua Sama began her career in 2013 after being discovered by Tanzanian rapper and politician Mwana FA. They collaborated on the song "So Crazy" later that year. "So Crazy" was first recorded by Maua Sama, produced by and featured local artists from her home town Moshi, Kilimanjaro and later it was re-recorded and featured Mwana FA. In 2015, she released her debut single, "Let Me Know," which introduced her to the wider Tanzanian audience. Tanzanian's The Citizens published about Maua's debut album which never come to life as of 2024.

=== Breakthrough ===
Maua Sama achieved recognition with the release of her hit single "Iokote" in 2018, featuring Hanstone. That year, Maua was nominated for the Best Female Award at the Soundcity MVP Awards.

=== 2022-present and Cinema EP ===
In 2022, Maua Sama released her 7-track EP Cinema, which delves into themes of love, vulnerability, and personal expression, and features collaborations with Tanzanian artists Ali Kiba and Jux. The project was well-received for its rich blend of Afrobeat, R&B, and Bongo Flava elements, and Maua's introspective songwriting.

== Musical style and influences ==
Maua Sama's music combines elements of Afrobeat, R&B, and Tanzanian Bongo Flava.

== Discography ==
- So Crazy (2013, with Mwana FA)
- Let Me Know (2015)
- Iokote (2018, featuring Hanstone)
- Cinema EP (2022)

== Awards and nominations ==
Best Female Award Nominee – Soundcity MVP Awards (2018)
