= Tanzania Music Awards =

National music awards

Tanzania Music Awards are national music awards held annually in Tanzania. They are also known as the Kilimanjaro Music Awards or the Kili Music Awards after their sponsor (Kilimanjaro Premium Lager). The awards were established in 1999 by the National Arts Council (BASATA) under the Tanzanian Ministry of Education and Culture.

== Award categories ==
List of Top Artist 2022:

List of 2022 awards:

- Song, Bongo Flava
- Artist, bongo flava (male)
- Entertainer, ⟨male⟩
- Entertainer, ⟨female⟩
- Artist, (male)
- Artist, emerging
- Album
- Video
- Artist, people's choice
- Artist, people's choice (female)
- Artist, East Africa
- Artist, West Africa
- Artist, South Africa
- Collabo, African
- Artist, singeli (male)
- Artist, singeli (female)
- Song, singeli
- Artist, reggae/dancehall
- Song, reggae/dancehall
- Artist, taarab
- Song, taarab
- Artist, hip-hop (male)
- Artist, hip-hop (female)
- Dancer
- Composer
- Composer, melody
- Director
- Producer, bongo flava
- Producer, singeli
- Producer, hip-hop

== 2010 winners ==
Category	Artist	Track
Best Male Singer	Banana Zorro	
Best Female Singer	Lady Jaydee	
Best Song Writer	Mzee Yusuf	
Best Upcoming Artist	Diamond Platnumuz	
Best Hip hop Artist	Chid Beenz	
Best Rapper (from a Band)	Kitokololo	
Best Song	Diamond Platnumz	'Kamwambie'
Best Music Video	CPwaa	'Problems'
Best Afro Pop Song	Marlaw	'Pii Pii'
Best R&B Song	Diamond Platnumz	'Kamwambie'
Best Hip Hop Song	Joh Makini	'Stimu Zimelipiwa'
Best Collaboration Song	AT ft Stara Thomas	'Nipigie'
Best Swahili Song (from a Band)	African Stars Band	'Mwana Dar es Salaam'
Best Album (from a Band)	African Stars Band	'Mwana Dar es Salaam'
Best Ragga/Dancehall Song	Bwana Misosi	'Mungu Yuko Bize'
Best Reggae Song	AY ft Wahu	'Leo (Reggae remix)'
Best Taarab Song	Jahazi Modern Taraab	'Daktari wa Mapenzi'
Best Taarab Album	Jahazi Modern Taraab	'Daktari wa Mapenzi'
Best East African Song	Kidumu and Juliana	'Haturudi Nyuma'
Best Traditional Song	Mrisho Mpoto	'Nikipata Nauli'
Best Producer	Lamar	
Hall of Fame trophy	to an individual: Zahir Zorro; to an institution: Clouds FM	

== 2011 winners ==
Category	Artist	Track
Best Male Artist	20 Percent	
Best Female Artist	Lady Jaydee	
Best Male Singer	20 Percent	
Best Female Singer	Linah Sanga	
Best Song Writer	20 Percent	
Best Upcoming Artist	Linah Sanga	
Best Hip Hop Artist	Joh Makini	
Best Rapper (from a Band)	Khalid Chokoraa	
Best Song	20 Percent	'Tamaa Mbaya'
Best music video	CPWAA ft Ms. Triniti, Albert Mangwea & Dully Sykes	'Action'
Best Afro Pop Song	20 Percent	'Ya Nini Malumbano'
Best R&B Song	Ben Pol	'Nikikupata'
Best Zouk/Rumba Song	Barnaba Classic	'Nabembelezwa'
Best Hip Hop Song	JCB ft Fid Q & Chidi Benz	'Ukisikia Paah'
Best Collaboration Song	JCB ft Fid Q & Chidi Benz & Jay Moe	'Ukisikia Paah'
Best Swahili Song (from a Band)	Mapacha Watatu ft Mzee Yusuph	'Shika Ushikapo'
Best Ragga/Dancehall Song	CPWAA ft Ms. Triniti, Albert Mangwea & Dully Sykes	'Action'
Best Reggae Song	Hardmad ft Enika & BNV	'Ujio Mpya'
Best Taarab Song	Jahazi Modern Taarab	'My Valentine'
Best East African Song	Kidum & Lady Jaydee	'Nitafanya'
Best Traditional Song	Mpoki Mjuni ft Cassim	'Shangazi'
Best Producer	Lamar (Fish Crab)	
Hall of Fame trophy	to an individual: Said Mabera; to an institution: Tanzania Broadcasting Radio (TBC)	

== 2012 winners ==
Category	Artist	Track
Best Male Artist	Diamond Platnumz	
Best Female Artist	Khadija Kopa	
Best Male Singer	Barnaba Classic	
Best Female Singer		
Best Song Writer	Supper Bass	
Best Upcoming Artist	Ommy Dimpoz	
Best Hip Hop Artist	Roma Mkatoliki	
Best Rapper (from a Band)	Kalijo Kitokololo	
Best Song	Suma Lee	'Hakunaga'
Best Music Video	Diamond Platnumz	'Moyo Wangu'
Best Afro Pop Song	Suma Lee	'Hakunaga'
Best R&B Song	Nicki Minaj	'You love'
Best Zouk/Rhumba Song	Ali Kiba	'Dushelele'
Best Hip Hop Song	Roma Mkatoliki	'Mathematics'
Best Collaboration Song	Ommy Dimpoz ft Ali Kiba	'Nai Nai'
Best Swahili Song (from a Band)	African Stars Band	'Dunia Daraja'
Best Ragga/Dancehall Song	Queen Darleen ft Dully Sykes	'Maneno Maneno'
Best Reggae Song	Warrior from the East	'Arusha Gold'
Best Taarab Song	Isha Mashauzi	'Nani Kama Mama'
Best East African Song	Jaguar	'Kigeugeu'
Best Traditional Song	AT & Mwanne	'Vifuu Utundu'
Best Producer	Maneke (AM Records)	
Hall of Fame trophy	to an individual: Remmy Ongala; to an institution: JKT	

== 2013 winners ==
Category	Artist	Track
Best male artist	Diamond Platnumz	
Best Female Artist	Lady Jaydee	
Best Male Singer	Diamond	
Best Female Singer	Recho	
Best Song Writer	Ben Pol, Mzee Yusuf, Kala Jeremiah, Chalz Baba	
Best Upcoming Artist	Ally Nipishe	
Best Hip Hop Artist	Kala Jeremiah	
Best Rapper (from a Band)	Fagasoni/Ferguson	
Best Song	Kala Jeremiah	Dear God
Best Music Video	Ommy Dimpoz Diamond Platnumz	Baadaye
Best Afro Pop Song	Ommy Dimpoz ft Vanessa Mdee	Me an You
Best R&B Song of the year	Rama Dee ft. Mapacha Watatu	Kuwa na subira
Best Zouk/Rhumba Song	Amini	
Best Hip Hop Song	Nay wa Mitego	Nasema Nao
Best Collaboration Song	Ommy Dimpoz ft Vanessa Mdee	Me and you
Best Swahili Song (from a Band)	Mashujaa Band	Risasi Kidole
Best Ragga/Dancehall Song	Dabo	Predator
Best Reggae Song	Kilimanjaro	Warriors from The East
Best Taarab Song	Mjini Chuo Kikuu Khadija Kopa	Mjini Chuo Kikuu
Best East African Song	Jose Chameleone	Valu Valu
Best upcoming songwriter	Master FFE	
Best Traditional Song	Chocheeni Kuni	Mrisho Mpoto ft Ditto
Best Producer	Man Walter	
Hall of Fame trophy	to an individual: Salum Abdallah; to an institution: Kilimanjaro Band wana Njenje	

== 2022 winners ==
2022 Tanzania Music Awards
Category	Winner (work)	Nominee (work)	Nominee (work)	Nominee (work)	Nominee (work)
Artist, (male)	Harmonize	Professor Jay	Ben Pol	Jux	Young Lunya
Artist, (female)	Nandy	Frida Amani	Joyce S. Mwaikofu	Christina Shusho	
Entertainer, ⟨male⟩	Harmonize	Ali Kiba	Sholo Mwamba	Dulla Makabila	Whozu
Entertainer, ⟨female⟩	Saraphina	Nandy	Shilole	Maua Sama	Anjella
Artist, emerging (male)	Rapcha	Kussah	Kinata MC	Lody Music	Damian Soul
Artist, emerging (female)	Saraphina	Abby Chams	Marry G	Zuhura A. Lwodyah	Trixy Tonic
Artist, people's choice (male)	Ali Kiba	Harmonize	Professor Jay	Jux	Marioo
Artist, people's choice (female)	Nandy	Rosa Ree	Maua Sama	Mary G	Christina Shusho
Album	Ali Kiba (One King)	Harmonize (High School)	Weusi (Air Weusi)	Marco; Chali (Ona)	Wakazi (Sauti za Busara Live)
Video	Ali Kiba (Salute)	Professor Jay (Utaniambia Nini)	Jux (Mapepe)	Kusah (I Wish)	Rapcha (Lisa)
Artist, East Africa	Ali Kiba	Alpha Rwirangira	Sauti Sol	Nandy	Eddy Kenzo
Artist, West Africa	Davido	Burna Boy	Wizkid	Tiwa Savage	Yemi Alade
Artist, South Africa	Sho Madjozi	Focalistic	Jay Rox	Cassper Nyovest	DJ Maphorisa
Song, bongo flava	Marioo (Beer Tamu)	Harmonize (Teacher)	Nandy (Nimekuzoea)	Jux (Sawa)	Maua Sama (Zai)
Artist, bongo flava (male)	Marioo	Harmonize	Ben Pol	Jux	Whozu
Artist, bongo flava (Female)	Nandy	Rosa Ree	Mary G	Saraphina	Anjella
Collabo, African	Harmonize (Attitude)	Nandy (Leo Leo)	Jux (Free Your Mind)	Marioo (Miamor)	Whozu (Chawa)
Artist, singeli (male)	Sholo Mwamba	Balaa MC	Kinata MC	Man Fongo	Meja Kunta
Artist, singeli (female)	Snura	Mimah	Rehema Khamis Tajiri	Lamona	
Song, singeli	Sholo Mwamba (Alowee)	Kinata MC (Do Lemi Go)	Balaa MC (Stress)	Kala Jeremiah (Wewe)	Fido (Ugaigai)
Artist, reggae/dancehall	Baddest 47	Ras Squad	Dabo Mtanzania	Warriours From the East	Paul Raphael Mihambo
Song, reggae/dancehall	Baddest 47 (Unaota)	Arusha All Star (Mwenge)	Dabo Mtanzania (Propaganda)	Ras Squad (Queen)	Warriours from the East (Jambo Remix)
Artist, taarab (male)	Mzee Yusuph	Mwinyi Mkuu			
Artist, taarab (female)	Khadija Yussuf	Sikudhani Ally	Nasra Shaban Abdallah	Fatma Mahmoud	Malkia Leyla Rashid
Song, taarab	Mzee Yusuph (Usinifokee)	Mwinyi Mkuu (Keep Talking)	DSM Taarab (Tunapwaga na Uhuru)	Mwanahamisi Pogoba (Roho Mbaya Ugonjwa)	
Artist, hip-hop (male)	Young Lunya	Professor Jay	Darassa	Rapcha	Nay Wa Mitego
Artist, hip-hop (female)	Chemical	Zuhura A. Lwodyah	Liss La Mode	Rosa Ree	Frida Amani
Lyricist	Professor Jay (Utaniambia Nini)	Ali Kiba (Utu)	Rapcha (Lisa)	Marioo (Miamor)	Darassa (Loyalty)
Composer, melody	Ali Kiba	Chege	Maarifa	Stamina	Marioo
Dancer, (female)	Baby Drama				
Director	Hanscana	Travellah	Joozey	Nicklass	Director S
Producer, bongo flava	Mr T Touch	S2kizzy	Kimambo	Yogo Beats	Bin Laden
Producer, hip-hop	S2kizzy	Mr T Touch	Kimambo	Yogo Beats	Bin Laden
Producer, singeli	Kenny Touchez (Do Lemi Go)	Kenny Touchez (Sawa)			
*Note: Damian Soul is a long-established artist nominated to the 'emerging artist' category by mistake.

== See also ==
- Music of Tanzania
