= Rosa Ree =

Tanzanian rapper

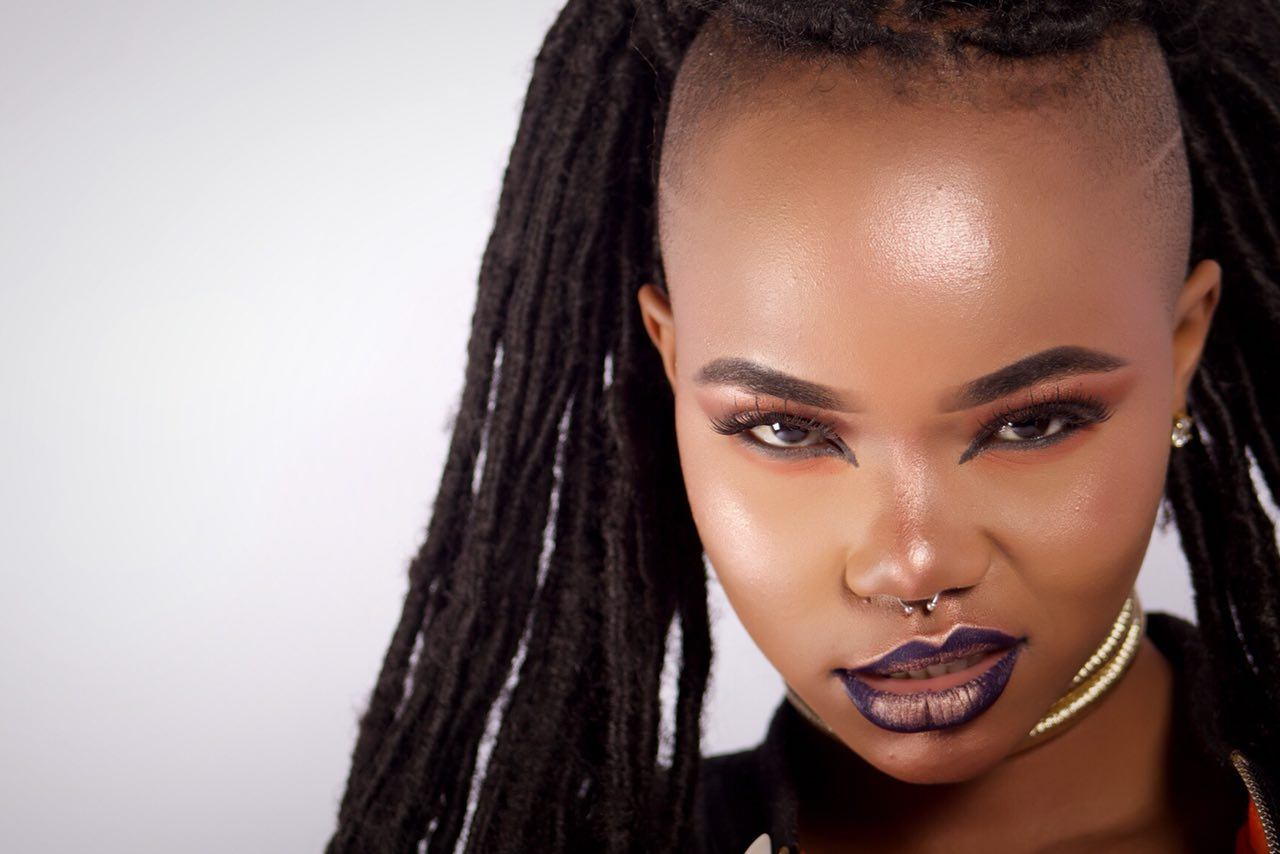

Background information
- Also known as: Rosa Ree
- Born: Rosary Robert Iwole; April 21, 1995 (age 31); Moshi, Tanzania
- Genres: hip hop; Bongo Flava
- Occupations: rapper and singer
- Instrument: Vocals
- Years active: 2015-present
- Label: Independent

Rosary Robert Iwole (born April 21, 1995) known by her stage name Rosa Ree, is a Tanzanian rapper and singer.

== Early life and education ==
Rosa Ree was born in Moshi, Tanzania. She was raised in Arusha and spent some of her childhood in Kenya. She completed her basic education in Nairobi, Kenya, at Ainsworth Primary School and Rudolf Steiner Primary. She went on to complete her secondary education at Bishop Mazzoldi.

== Career ==
Rosa Red began her music career in 2015, and was signed by Nahreel's Label (The Industry Studios). She released her debut single "One Time" in 2016. In 2020, she was featured in the BET 2020 Hip Pop Cypher together with Kwesi Arthur from Ghana and Elizabeth Ventura from Angola.

== Discography ==
=== Albums ===
- Goddess (2022)

=== Singles ===
- Amen (2023)
- Moyo Wangu Tulia (2023)
- I'm Not Fine (2023)
- Afrikan Uptown Rankin (2023)
- Afrikan Rap (2022)
- My Cherie (2022)
- Emergency (2022)
- Threesome ft Chemical & Frida Amani (2022)
- Blue Print (2022)
- Mulla (2022)
- Wote ft Snake Fire, Barkeliam, DIZ Afrikana & Ray Medya (2021)
- Watatuba (2021)
- Wana Wanywe Pombe (2021)
- I'm Not Sorry (2021)
- Birthday (2021)
- Satan (2021)
- Usiyempenda Kaja (2020)
- That Gal (2020)
- Kanyor' Aleng (2020)
- Sukuma Ndinga Remix ft Rayvanny (2020)
- Kupoa (2020)
- Sukuma Ndinga (2020)
- Nazichanga ft Roberto (2020)
- Balenciaga (2020)
- Alamba Chini ft Spice Diana, Gigi Lamayne & Ghetto Kids (2019)
- What You Know (2019)
- Asante Baba Remix ft Timmy Tdat (2019)
- Dow (2019)
- VITAMIN U (2019)
- Acha Ungese ft Fik Fameica (2019)
- Hot Like Dat (2019)
- Jangu Ondabe (2019)
- Nguvu Za Kiume (2019)
- Champion ft Ruby (2019)
- Asante Baba (2019)
- Marathon ft Billnas (2019)
- Dip n' Whine it ft Gnako (2019)
- U.N.I.T.Y (2019)
- One Way (2018)
- Way Up ft Emtee (2018)
- Banjuka (2018)
- Up in the Air (2017)
- One Time (2016)
