= Shilole =

Tanzanian musical artist

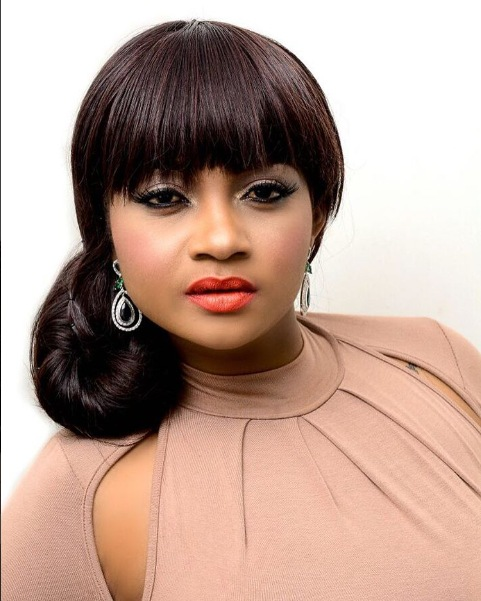
- Shilole in 2016

Background information
- Born: Zena Yusufu Mohammed; 20 December 1987 (age 38); Igunga, Tanzania
- Genres: R&B, Bongo Flava, Zouk, Afro Beat
- Occupations: Musician, actress, songwriter
- Years active: 2008–present
- Label: Independent
- Website: www.shilole.co.tz

Zena Yusuf Mohammed (born 20 December 1987, in Tanzania), known by her stage name Shilole, is a Tanzanian musician and actress. She specializes in R&B, Zouk, and new generation Tanzania music popularly known as Bongo Flava. Shilole is considered as one of the top female artists in Tanzania; her works has been nominated 3 times in KTMA, Tanzania's top music awards. She has also recorded with a number of artists including Mr Camera (South Africa) and Selebobo (Nigeria). Shilole is considered as one of the most influential artist among her fans and is said to be the most loved female artist in Tanzania, the first female artist in Tanzania to clock 1 million followers in Instagram, a record she holds for a long time Shilole is credited as one of the key figures in the popularization of Tanzania's new music genre Bongo Flava, as a career to upcoming female artists.

== Early life ==
Shilole was born in Igunga, Tabora, Tanzania in 1987. She was raised by a single mom who died when she was at an early age, Shilole worked hard to overcome her challenges to become one of the most influential artists of her generation in Tanzania. Shilole's story of overcoming a hard childhood and becoming one of the leading female artists in Tanzania is considered as an inspiration to many people in Tanzania. Her marriage in 2017-2018, was covered by Nairobi News.

=== Discography ===
Singles

- Lawama (2013)
- Dume Dada (2013)
- Paka la Bar (2013)
- Nakomaa na Jiji (2014)
- Chuna Buzi (2014)
- Namchuka (2015)
- Malele (2015)
- Nyang’anyang’a (2016)
- Say My Name (2016)
- Hatutoi Kiki (2016)
- Kigori (2017)
- Mchaka Mchaka (2018)

=== Brand associations ===
- In 2016 she signed up with Dume Condoms Tanzania to be their ambassador
- In 2015 she was appointed by Tanzania's ruling party CCM as one of the key influential artists to mobilize voters for the then Presidential candidate the late Dr John Pombe Magufuli who won the election.
- In 2018 she signed up with Tanzania Telecommunications Limited (TTCL) a government owned telecommunications company as their ambassador.
- In 2017 she established Shishi Foods, a chain of swahili food restaurants in Tanzania's commercial capital, Dar es Salaam.
- Shilole is now a great businesswoman owning a famous restaurant known as Shishi food which has extended its operation to Dodoma. Shishi food is mainly operating its service in two regions, namely Dar es salaam and Dodoma.
