= Joh Makini =

- Born: John Simon Mseke; 27 March 1980 (age 45); Arusha, Tanzania
- Origin: Arusha
- Genres: Hip hop, Afropop
- Occupations: Rapper, songwriter, composer
- Years active: 2004 - Present
- Labels: Makini Music, Wanene Music
- Member of: WEUSI

John Simon Mseke (born March 27, 1980), popularly known by his stage name Joh Makini, is a Tanzanian hip hop recording artist and composer.

He is one of the members of the Tanzanian Hip Hop group called Weusi and also the founder and CEO of his record label, Makini Music. Joh Makini is from Arusha Tanzania and is one of the most celebrated rappers in the country.

== Career ==
Joh Makini was born in Arusha Tanzania and was raised in a family with four siblings including his younger brother, Nikki Wa Pili who is also a rapper. His breakthrough came in 2006 after releasing a hit song, "Chochote Popote," which brought him to the limelight as a rising hip-hop star in Tanzania.

In 2012 he joined forces with Nikki Wa Pili, Bonta Maarifa, Lord Eyez and G Nako to form a hip-hop group dubbed Weusi. Weusi became notable as they performed in different music festivals around the country including FIesta

Around 2014 Joh Makini started venturing into the African music market. He collaborated with different African artists such as Nigeria's Chidinma in "Perfect Combo" Davido In "Kata Leta" and late South African rapper, AKA who he worked with in “Don’t Bother” "Don’t Bother" became a hit that earned him a nomination at The African Entertainment Awards USA.

In 2021, Joh Makini teamed up with Weusi to release their first album titled Air Weusi along with an accompanying tour around different regions in Tanzania.

== Personal life ==
Joh Makini is an older brother to Nikki Wa Pili, a Tanzanian rapper who is now a district commissioner of Kisarawe Dar es Salaam. He is also known for his close ties with Navy Kenzo, Vanessa Mdee and Mimi Mars who he was rumoured to date in 2019.

== Discography ==
Albums

Zamu Yangu (2007)

Singles

Nusu Nusu

Dangerous

Mchele

Zamu Yangu

Mipaka

Niaje Ni Vipi

Stimu Zimelipiwa
