= Jux =

Tanzanian artist and songwriter (born 1989)

- Also known as: African Boy
- Born: Juma Mussa Mkambala; 1 September 1989 (age 36); Dar es Salaam, Tanzania
- Origin: Singida Region
- Genres: Bongo Flava; Afropop; R&B
- Occupations: Singer, songwriter
- Instrument: Vocals
- Years active: 2011–present
- Label: African Boy
- Spouse: Priscilla Ojo (m. 2025)

Juma Mussa Mkambala (born 1 September 1989), known professionally as Jux, is a Tanzanian singer and songwriter. His music blends R&B, Bongo Flava, and Afrobeats. His songs include "Enjoy", "Nitasubiri", "Fashion Killer", "Sugua", "Juu", and "Nidhibiti". Jux has collaborated with African musicians, including Diamond Platnumz, Vanessa Mdee, Joh Makini, Zuchu, Gyakie, Bien, and Marioo.

== Early life and career ==
Jux was born on 1 September 1989 in Dar es Salaam. His interest in music began in his teens when he started rapping.

In 2008, Jux signed with Tanzanian record label A.M Records and began recording R&B songs. He subsequently released several songs, including "Sugua" featuring Diamond Platnumz, "Juu" featuring Vanessa Mdee, and "Regina" featuring Otile Brown. In 2015, he won the Best R&B Song award at Kili Music Awards (also known as the Tanzania Music Awards). In 2017, he won the Best East African Music Video award at the Zanzibar International Film Festival.

In 2018, Jux was nominated for Best Male East Africa at the All Africa Music Awards. His song "Uzuri Wako" was banned by the Tanzanian Communications Regulatory Authority, alongside songs by several other artists, including Diamond Platnumz, for allegedly violating the 2005 Advertising Services (Content) Regulations.

After releasing numerous singles, Jux released his debut album The Love Album in 2019, featuring collaborations with Singah, Diamond Platnumz, Nyashinski, Vanessa Mdee, G Nako, and Joh Makini. The 18-track album received more than 1.3 million streams on Boomplay, while its lead single, "Sugua", amassed more than 10 million views on YouTube. The album was distributed by Africori, a partner of Warner Music Group. In November 2022, he released his second album, King of Hearts, featuring collaborations with Zuchu, Marioo, Mbosso, Terri, and Bien. In 2023, he released "Enjoy", which became popular on TikTok. The song received mixed reviews from critics who cited a resemblance to Spyro's "Who Is Your Guy", and was later removed from YouTube following copyright claims.

== Personal life ==
Jux dated Tanzanian artist Vanessa Mdee for about six years. They released singles together, and in 2018 embarked on "In Love with Money" tour. They separated in 2019.

In February 2023, Jux confirmed that he was dating Karen Bujulu.

In August 2024, Jux became engaged to Priscilla Ojo, daughter of Nigerian actress Iyabo Ojo. They married in April 2025.They welcomed a child, Rakeem, in August 2025.

== The African Boy Brand ==
Jux established a fashion brand, The African Boy Brand, in 2018. He later announced plans to expand the brand to Kenya.

== Awards and nominations ==
Year	Award	Category	Nominated work	Result
2015	Tanzania Music Awards	Best R&B Song	"Nitasubiri"	Won
2015	Tanzania Music Awards	Best Artist	Jux	Nominated
2017	Zanzibar International Film Festival	Best East African Music Video	"Utaniua"	Won
2018	Tanzania Music Awards	Best East African Artist	Jux	Nominated
2019	Tanzania Music Awards	Best East African Artist	Jux	Nominated
2025	Headies Award	Best East African Artist	Jux	Won

== Discography ==
=== Albums ===
Year	Title	Album
2019	"Zaidi"	The Love Album
2019	"Unaniweza"	The Love Album
2019	"Wambela" (featuring Ruby)	The Love Album
2019	"Upofu"	The Love Album
2019	"In Case You Don't Know" (featuring Nyashinski)	The Love Album
2019	"Sugarcane" (featuring Gnako & Tommy Flavour)	The Love Album
2019	"Slowly"	The Love Album
2019	"Sumaku" (featuring Vannessa Mdee)	The Love Album
2019	"Sio Mbaya"	The Love Album
2019	"Bado Yupo"	The Love Album
2019	"Kibindoni"	The Love Album
2019	"Sugua" (featuring Diamond Platnumz)	The Love Album
2019	"Fashion Killer" (featuring Singah)	The Love Album
2019	"Yeye"	The Love Album
2019	"Now You Know" (featuring Q-Chief)	The Love Album
2019	"Tell Me" (featuring Joh Makini)	The Love Album
2019	"Umenibamba"	The Love Album

=== Singles and collaborations ===
2015	"Nitasubiri"
2015	"Nikuite Nani"
2015	"Looking for You" (featuring Joh Makini)
2015	"One More Night"
2015	"Jux Sisikii"
2016	"Wivu"
2016	"Juu" – Vanessa Mdee (featuring Jux)
2017	"Utaniua"
2017	"Umenikamata"
2018	"Fimbo"
2018	"Tell Me " (featuring Joh Makini)
2018	"Hatufanani" – Shetta (featuring Jux)
2018	"Zaidi"
	"Regina" – Otile Brown (feat. Jux)
2019	"Covid 19" (featuring Maua Sama)
2019	"Leo" – Darassa (featuring Jux)
2019	"Juju" – Darassa (featuring Jux)
2023	"Enjoy" (featuring Diamond Platnumz)
2024	"Ololufe mi" (featuring Diamond Platnumz)
2025	"Si Mimi"
	"God Design" (featuring Phyno)
