= Lady Jaydee =

Tanzanian musician and songwriter

Lady JayDee
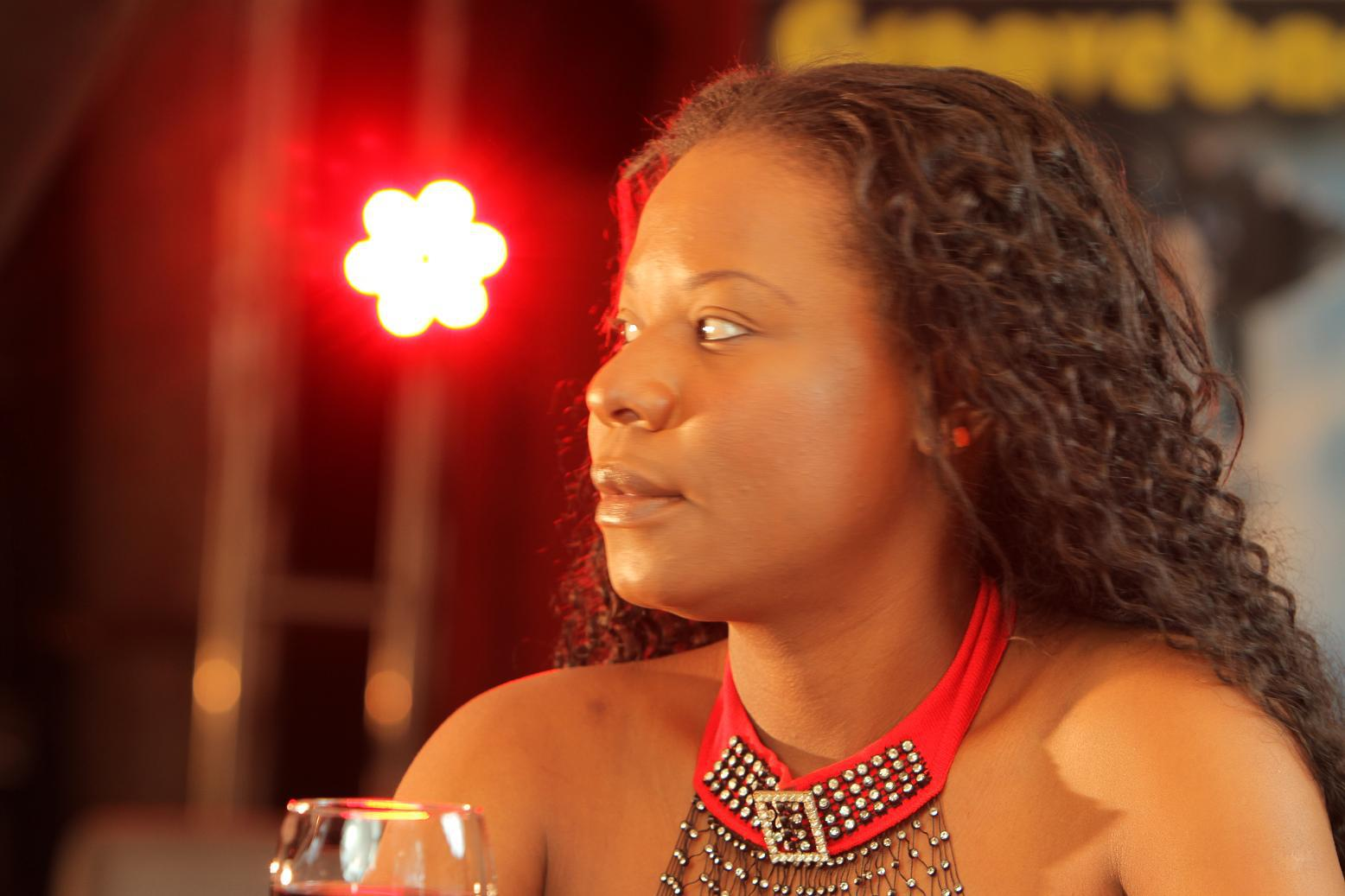
- Lady Jaydee in 2016

Background information
- Also known as: Jide, Commando
- Born: Judith Wambura Mbibo; 15 June 1979 (age 47); Shinyanga, Tanzania
- Genres: R&B, Afro pop, Hip Hop, Bongo Flava
- Occupations: Singer-songwriter, rapper, pianist
- Years active: 2000–present
- Label: Lady Jay Dee Ent (2017-)
- Website: jidejaydee.com

Judith Wambura Mbibo (born 15 June 1979), known by her stage name Lady Jaydee also referred to as "Lady JayDee in town" or "Lady Jay Dee", is a Tanzanian singer. She specializes in the R&B, Zouk and Afro Pop genres. Lady Jaydee was voted as the Best Tanzanian Female R&B Artist in 2002, performed at the Kora All Africa Designers Competition, and was awarded for the "Best R&B Album" at the Tanzania Music Awards on 6 August 2004. In July 2005, she won an award for "best female video for South Africa". She was among the first women to sing R&B in Swahili. Lady Jaydee is signed to Universal Music East Africa She is also known as the Queen of Bongo Flava (Tanzanian Music).

== Early life and education ==
Lady Jay Dee was born in Shinyanga Tanzania in a family of ten children. Her late father is Lameck Mbibo and her mother is Martha Mbibo. She completed her primary school education at Bugoyi Primary School in Shinyanga and her secondary education at Zanaki Secondary School. In 2017, Lady Jaydee signed a recording deal with Taurus Musik which is also a label for Alicios Theluji.

== Brand associations ==
- In 2009 she signed up with Zain Tanzania (now known as Airtel Tanzania) to be their ambassador.
- In 2010 she was appointed by Comprehensive Community Based Rehabilitation In Tanzania (CCBRT) to be their Ambassador to help women who are suffering from Fistular disease.
- In 2012 she was an ambassador of NMB (National Microfinance Bank) Tanzania for the project which was known as "PESA FASTA".
- In March 2014 she signed up with international cosmetics brand Oriflame Sweden to be one of their brand ambassadors.
- In 2014 she was appointed by Marie Stopes Tanzania to be the Ambassador of Family Planning Tanzania.
- In June 2015 she signed up with Tanzania Geita Gold Mine to be the Ambassador of Geita Gold Mine Kill Challenge Fund Against HIV/AIDS.

== Discography ==
She has released eight studio albums, one duet album and one compilation album:

- Machozi (2000)
- Binti (2003)
- Moto (2005)
- Shukrani (2007)
- Ya 5: Best of Lady JayDee [Compilation Album] (2012)
- Nothing But The Truth (2013)
- Woman (2017)
- 20 (2021)
- Love Sentence [Duet with Rama Dee] (2023)
- Silver (2025)

== Coke Studio Africa ==
- In 2013 Lady Jaydee was featured in Coke Studio Africa season One where she performed her hit songs " Joto Hasira" and " Yahaya". She also collaborated with Salif Keita, the African music legend from Mali, and worked closely with Coke Studio Africa Music Director, Franck Biyong.

Jaydee was also a judge in The Voice Africa 2023 alongside Yemi Alade, Locko and Awilo Longomba
