= Ali Kiba =

Tanzanian musician and songwriter

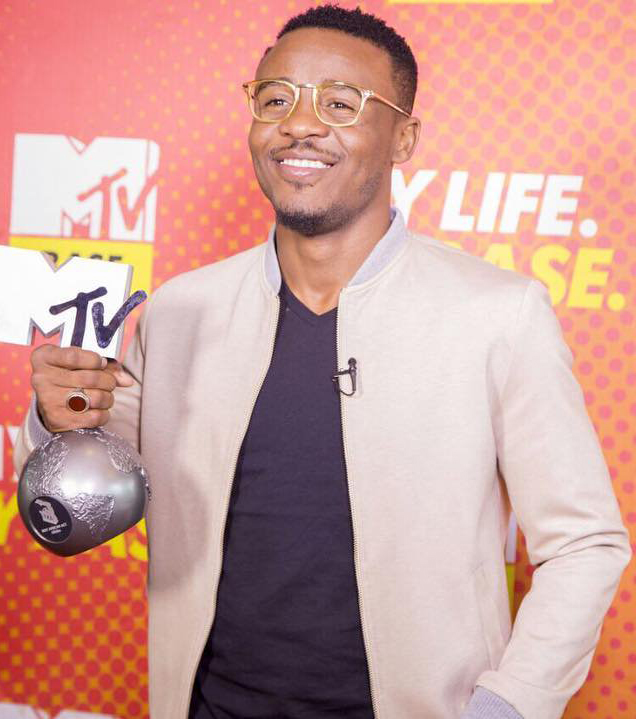
- Kiba at the 2016 MTV EMA Awards as the Best African Act
- Born: 29 November 1986 (age 39); Kigoma Region, Tanzania
- Other name: King Kiba
- Occupations: Actor; Singer; Director; Footballer
- Years active: 2004–present
- Musical career
- Also known as: King Kiba
- Origin: Tanzania
- Genres: Afropop; R&B; Bongo Flava; ndombolo
- Instruments: Vocals; Piano
- Labels: Rock; Kings Music; Sony Music Entertainment
- Website: https://www.instagram.com/officialalikiba

Ali Saleh Kiba (born 29 November 1986), best known as Ali Kiba or occasionally as King Kiba, is a Tanzanian musician and songwriter. He is sometimes referred to as the King of Bongo Flava. He is from Kigoma and the owner of both Kings Music label and Crown Media Group. With hit songs such as Mwana, Aje, Chekecha Cheketua, Cinderella, Nakshi Mrembo, Usiniseme, Dushelele, Single Boy with Lady Jaydee, Mapenzi Yana Run Dunia and Macmuga. Ali Kiba is usually regarded as one of the most successful Bongo Flava stars usually associated with his close rival Diamond Platnumz.

In 2008 Alikiba collaborated with R. Kelly and other African musicians on the One 8 project. Since then the multiple award-winner singer collaborated with various music heavyweights such as Patoranking, Sauti Sol, Marioo, Nyashinski, Khaligraph Jones and Sarkodie among others.

Around 2011 Alikiba took a three years hiatus from the music industry and returned in 2014 with the release of "Mwana". The song was well received by fans and made him to win 5 awards at the 2015 Tanzania Music Awards

On his comeback, Alikiba was signed under Rockstar 4000, music label owned by Christine Mosha. Under the label, Alikiba released many hit songs including Chekecha Cheketua, Lupela, Mvumo Wa Radi and Aje, a Bongo Flava love song that was ranked number 3 by Notjustok on their list of Best 100 Tanzanian songs of the decade ranging from 2012 to 2022

In May 2016, Alikiba signed to Sony Music, being the first East African to be signed by the recording company. He left both Sony and Rockstar 4000 in 2021 and started his own record label, Kings Music which now houses different Tanzanian acts such as Tommy Flavour, Vanillah, K2ga and Abdu Kiba.

In November 2021, Alikiba released his third studio album titled Only One King containing 16 songs including Utu, Niteke, Salute featuring Rude Boy, Jealous featuring Mayorkun and Washa featuring Nyashinski.

Only One King which Alikiba termed as a "Pan African album" went on to win the Best Album category in the 2022 Tanzanian music awards, a highly prestigious ceremony that Alikiba went on to win 5 awards in a single night where he also won other categories such as Best Male Artist People's Choice, Best Music Video for his smash hit "Salute" featuring Nigerian Rudeboy, Best Melodic Songwriter of the Year and Best East African Artist during the ceremony.

Alikiba became the most awarded Tanzanian artist in the 2022 Tanzania Music Awards followed by Nandy and Marioo who won 3 awards each.

On March 10, 2024, Bongo Flava star Alikiba launched his new radio station, Crown FM 92.1, broadcasting in Dar es Salaam, Zanzibar, Tanga, and Pwani.

== Early life beginning ==
Alikiba was born in Iringa to parents Saleh Omari and Tombwe Njere. He is the eldest son in a family of four. His siblings consist of his brother, Abdu Kiba who is also a musician, his sister, Zabibu Kiba, and the youngest brother, Abuu Kiba.

Although born in Iringa, Alikiba hails from Kigoma, where his family originated, reflecting a rich cultural heritage that has influenced his musical style.

He began nurturing his musical talents while attending Upanga Primary School, located in the bustling city of Dar es Salaam.

Alikiba, was fascinated by music and dance since childhood, began his music career after his 12th exam in 2004. His debut song, "Maria," showcased his talent and made him one of the most promising talents in Tanzania at the time.

In 2005, he chose music over a soccer offer from the Ugandan team, focusing on singing and composing.

== Career ==
Ali's debut album and hit single ‘Cinderella’ became the biggest selling record in East Africa in 2008 and his second album ‘Ali K 4 Real’ was released in 2009 with the mega-hits ‘Nakshi Mrembo’, ‘Nichuum’ and ‘Usiniseme’.

He was later endorsed by the mobile telephony brand Airtel Africa alongside the Billboard Most Influential Global R&B Artist for the past 25 years, American recording artist R. Kelly and seven of Africa's other megastar artists Fally Ipupa (DRC/France), 2Face Idibia (Nigeria), Amani (Kenya), Movaizhaleine (Gabon), 4X4 (Ghana), Navio (Uganda), JK (Zambia). Alikiba has been nominated for ‘Best International Act’ for Black Entertainment Film, Fashion, Television and Arts Awards in 2009, Best East African Artist for African Music Awards in 2009, Winner of Best Zouk / Rhumba Song at the Kili Music Awards in 2012, Nominated for Best Tanzanian Writer, Best Male Artists and Best Collaborating song with Lady Jaydee for Kili Music Awards in 2013.

On 20 May 2016, he signed a deal with Sony Music Entertainment. He later left Sony in 2021 after working with them for five years.

== Personal life ==
Alikiba married Amina Khaleef in 2018 in a highly publicized wedding that took place in Mombasa, Kenya.

In June 2023 Amina Khaleef went on publicly to explain she left the Tanzanian singer to find her peace of mind, but the singer was refusing to give her the divorce.

== Awards and nominations ==
Edward awards 2011 in uganda
