= Bongo Flava =

Tanzanian popular music genre

- Stylistic origins: Tanzanian hip hop • Taarab • Tanzanian music • Dancehall
- Cultural origins: 1990s Dar es Salaam

Subgenres
- Singeli

Regional scenes
- Kenya; Uganda; Burundi

Local scenes
- Tanzania • Zanzibar

Other topics
- Muziki wa dansi; Ngoma music; Zenji flava

Bongo Flava is a nickname for Tanzanian music. The genre was developed in the 1990s, mainly as a derivative of American hip hop and traditional Tanzanian styles such as taarab and dansi. Lyrics are usually in Swahili or English.

== Etymology ==
The name "Bongo" in Bongo Flava comes from Kiswahili usually meaning brains, intelligence, cleverness. Bongo is the augmentative form of Ubongo, a Swahili word for Brain. Flava is a Swahili term for Flavour.

Bongo is a term which was originally used to refer to the Tanzanian city of Dar es Salaam. Outside Tanzania, Bongo often refers to Tanzania. Bongo as a term originated in the late 1970s during a very difficult time following both the global fuel shocks of the '70's and the Kagera war against Uganda. The term Bongo was being used as a clever way to say both, namely, survival in Dar es Salaam required both brain and intelligence.

In 1981, musician Remmy Ongala joined a band called Orchestra Super Matimila. Each band had a unique mtindo (style/fashion) and Ongala's band Matimila named their mtindo "Bongo Beat". Ongala later became the most famous musician ever for Tanzania, reaching global fame working with English singer Peter Gabriel.

== History ==
Bongo Flava is a large divergent evolution of muziki wa kizazi kipya, meaning "music of the new generations", which originated in the middleclass youth of Kinondoni District, in Dar es Salaam between the mid-1980s and 1990s. Taji Liundi, also known as Master T, the original creator and producer of the Dj Show program had already started airing songs by fledgling local artists by late 1994. Radio hosts Mike Muhagama and Taji Liundi led the way in radio support of local artists. Mike Mhagama eventually joined the popular program as an under-study to Taji Liundi and also went on to produce and present the show alone after Taji Liundi left Radio One in 1996.

"Bongo Flava" existed well before the first audio or video recordings. The youth in Dar es Salaam were rapping at beach concerts (organized by Joseph Kusaga and the late Ruge Mutahaba, who together own Mawingu Discotheque, Mawingu Studios and now Clouds Media Group), local concert halls and taking part in the first official rap competition called Yo! Rap Bonanza series that were promoted by Abdulhakim "DJ Kim" Magomelo under his promotion company "Kim & The Boyz".

Some of the youth were organized with fancy names, some were solo or formed impromptu groups at the event to get a chance to perform. An icon of the open performance artists in the early 1990s was Adili or Nigga One. The first influential dub artiste of the genre was Saleh Jabir who rapped in Kiswahili over the instrumentals of Vanilla Ice's, "Ice Ice Baby", he was solely responsible for making Kiswahili a viable language to rap in. His version was so popular that broke ranks by receiving mild airplay in the conservative National Radio Tanzania, thus making the first rap song on Tanzanian radio.

One of the earliest groups to actually record and deliver a CD to Radio One for airing was Mawingu Band, an outfit that became hugely popular in early 1994. They recorded at Mawingu Studios. Its members were Othman Njaidi, Eliudi Pemba, Columba Mwingira, Sindila Assey, Angela, Robert Chuwa, Boniface Kilosa (a.k.a. Dj Boni Love) and later Pamela who sang the famous hook of their breakthrough first RnB/Rap single "Oya Msela". The song was so popular and ahead of its time that the Msela label stuck. 'Msela' is the Swahili word for 'ruffian'.

== Popular Bongo Flava artists ==
Bongo Flava popular artists include Bruce Africa, Baraka The Prince, Maua Sama, Vanessa Mdee (Vee Money), Bill Nass, Diamond Platnumz, Harmonize, Jux, Alikiba, A.Y., Shetta, Ben Pol, Lava Lava, Dully Sykes, Rich Mavoko, Juma Nature, Rayvanny, Nandy, Marioo, Zuchu, Mwana FA, Shilole, Jay Melody, Mbosso, Mimi Mars, Queen Darleen, Phina, Dogo Janja, Kusah, Joh Makini and more.

== Concerts and festivals ==
Since its inception, concerts and festivals in many ways have helped to push Bongo Flava and help surge its popularity. One of the first such festival is Fiesta organized by Clouds Media Group, where Bongo Flava artists usually go on a music tour in different Tanzanian regions. Throughout the years, Fiesta has been an instrument in spreading the Bongo Flava wave across Tanzania.

== Popularity ==
Today, "Bongo Flava" is the most popular musical style amongst the Tanzanian youth, something that is also reflected in the vast number of TV and radio programs dedicated to this genre as well as the sales figures of bongo flava albums.

Outside of its historical home of Tanzania, Bongo Flava has become a resoundingly popular sound in neighboring, culturally related countries such as Kenya and Uganda. Bongo Flava has even found a home outside of the African continent; the most popular artists in the genre have recently begun to address Western markets and the self-proclaimed "best internet station for Bongo Flava," Bongo Radio, happens to be based out of Chicago, Illinois. There are now also playlists dedicate to the genre of global streaming platforms such as iTunes and Spotify, increasing Bongo-Flava's visibility.

Despite the popularity of "Bongo Flava" and the large number of well-known artists throughout Tanzania, copying of music is widespread due to the weak enforcement of copyright laws, and most artistes are unable to make a living selling their music. Instead, most rely on income from live performances to support themselves, or income from other business ventures, using their social influence as leverage. However, there are instances of 'success stories', the career of artist Diamond Platnumz, and producer-artist Nahreel are often cited as sources of inspiration for many artists and producers.

According to editor-at-large Brian Muhumuza Bishanga, Bongo Flava started to make waves across Africa in major markets such as Nigeria, Ghana and South Africa around 2014 when Diamond Platnumz released his smash hit My Number One and its accompanying remix featuring Nigerian star, Davido. It was also around that time that different African based music channels began to give heavy rotation to Bongo Flava songs from different heavyweights such as Diamond Platnumz, Vanessa Mdee, Joh Makini, Navy Kenzo and more.

Since then different Bongo Flava stars started working with different Nigerian superstars. The international collaborations has made it possible for Bongo Flava to be popular in other countries. Diamond Platnumz, for example, has worked with different heavyweight superstars such as KCEE, Rema, Chike, Koffi Olomide, Adekunle Gold, Omarion, Morgan Heritage and more.

Harmonize, another heavyweight Tanzanian star has worked with different music heavyweights in his efforts to popularize Bongo Flava. Harmonize has worked with different heavyweights such as Awilo Longomba, Spice, Sarkodie, Korede Bello, Naira Marley, Yemi Alade and more.

== Characteristics ==
While "Bongo Flava" is clearly related to American hip hop, it is also clearly distinguished from its Western counterpart. As the bongoflava.net website puts it, "these guys don't need to copy their brothers in America, but have a sure clear sense of who they are and what sound it is they're making". The sound "has its roots in the rap, R&B and hip hop coming from America, but from the beginning, these styles have been pulled apart and put back together with African hands".

The typical "Bongo Flava" artist identifies with the mselah. It is in this sense that, for example, members of the hip hop crew Afande Sele call themselves watu pori, i.e., "men of the savannah". A sort of manifesto of mselah ideology is given by the song Mselah Jela by Bongo flava singer Juma Nature, who defines a mselah, amongst other things, as an "honest person of sincere heart". Following the tradition of western hip hop (as represented by the pioneering hip hop group Afrika Bambaataa), bongo flava lyrics usually tackle social and political issues such as poverty, political corruption, superstition, and HIV/AIDS, often with a more or less explicit educational intent, an approach that is sometimes referred to as "edutainment". Afande Sele, for example, have written songs that are intended to teach prevention of malaria and HIV. However, this has changed in recent years and increasingly many commercial Bongo Flava songs deal with topics such as love, heartbreak, success and hardship. This change in topic remains a point of contention between the earlier generation who saw the rise of Bongo Flava, and the new generation who tend to prefer catchy and club ready songs. Whether this is due to globalisation and western influence or due to a change in listener's taste, is the question at the centre of the debate. Some Bongo groups are very popular within their ethnic group; one example is the Maasai X Plastaz who developed their own subgenre known as "Maasai hip hop".

== Bongopiano ==
Bongopiano blends bongo flava music and amapiano, emerging in Tanzania in the 2020s. Key figures of bongopiano include Diamond Platnumz, Alikiba, Natasha, Pride Boy 4Real, Marioo, Harmonize, Nandy, Jux, Mbosso and Zuchu.

== See also ==
- Music of Tanzania
- Kwaito
- Afrobeats
- Afroswing
- Gqom
