= List of Tanzanians =

This is a list of notable people from Tanzania.

== Artists ==
- George Lilanga (1934–2005), Makonde artist

== Business people ==
- Jayantilal Chande (1928–2017), businessman and philanthropist
- Reginald Mengi (c.1943–2019)
- Ali Mufuruki (1959–2019)
- Mohammed Dewji (born 1975)

== Fashion ==
- Mustafa Hassanali (born 1980), fashion designer
- Nancy Sumari (born 1986), Miss Tanzania 2005
- Flaviana Matata (born 1987), fashion

== Human rights ==
- Geline Fuko (born c.1980), lawyer and human rights activist
- Fatma Karume, lawyer, human rights
- Salma Kikwete (born 1963), wife of President Jakaya Kikwete
- Kinjikitile Ngwale (died 1905), medium and leader of the Maji Maji Rebellion
- John Okello (1937–1971), revolutionary
- Rakesh Rajani (born 1966), world civil society leader
- Maria Sarungi Tsehai, activist
- Anna Tibaijuka (born 1950), Under-Secretary-General of the United Nations
- Frederick Werema (born 1954), former attorney general of Tanzania

== Media ==
- Benjamin Fernandes (born 1992), TV presenter and public speaker
- Sajjad Fazel, (born 1991), health researcher and columnist

== Musicians ==
- Siti binti Saad (1880–1950), Taarab singer
- Bi Kidude (c. 1910s–2013), Zanzibari Taarab singer
- Hukwe Zawose (1938–2003), singer
- Freddie Mercury (1946–1991), lead singer of Queen
- George Kinyonga (died 1992), Kenyan/Tanzanian musician
- Bakar (born 1992), singer
- Daniel Owino Misiani (1940–2006), Kenyan/Tanzanian benga musician
- Cool James (1970–2002), rapper
- Joseph Mbilinyi (Mr. II) (born 1972), rapper
- Imani Sanga (born 1972), composer and ethnomusicologist
- Joseph Haule (Professor Jay) (born 1975), rapper
- Rose Mhando (born 1976), gospel singer
- Saida Karoli (born 1976), singer
- Lady Jaydee (born 1979), pop singer
- Dully Sykes (born 1981), rapper
- Tumi Molekane (born 1981), South African/Tanzanian rapper
- Ray C (born 1982), artist, singer-songwriter
- Nakaaya Sumari (born 1982), model and singer
- Baby Madaha (born 1988), singer
- Diamond Platnumz (born 1989), artist, songwriter and dancer
- Bill Nass (born 1993), rapper
- Ali Kiba (born 1980), artist, singer-songwriter, dancer and actor
- Nahreel (born 1989), producer, artist in Navy Kenzo Duo group
- Harmonize (born 1991), musician
- Mimi Mars (born 1992), singer and actress
- Lava Lava (born 1993), singer
- Aslay (born 1995), singer
- Barnaba Classic, singer-songwriter
- Lucas Mkenda, singer
- Darassa, rapper
- Albert Mangwea, rapper
- Abby Chams, singer and social activist
- RJ The DJ, (born 1988), DJ, singer and actor
- Gigy Money, (born 1998), singer and socialite

== Politicians ==
- Anna Abdallah (born 1940), Member of Parliament
- Maida Abdallah (born 1970), Member of Parliament
- Aziza Sleyum Ally, Member of Parliament
- Ameir Ali Ameir (born 1961), Member of Parliament
- Ame Pandu Ame (born 1963), Member of Parliament
- Bahati Ali Abeid (born 1967), Member of Parliament
- Thobias Andengenye (living), regional commissioner
- Mohamed Rished Abdallah (born 1952), Member of Parliament
- Mohammed Abdi Abdulaziz (born 1958), Member of Parliament
- Khadija Salum Ally Al-Qassmy (born 1958), Member of Parliament
- Juma Jamaldin Akukweti (1947–2007), Member of Parliament
- Ali Tarab Ali (born 1947), Member of Parliament
- Ali Haji Ali (born 1948), Member of Parliament
- Fatma Ali (born 1950), Member of Parliament
- Naimi Sweetie Hamza Aziz, ambassador
- Paul Bomani (1925–2005), ambassador
- Patrick Chokala, ambassador to Russia
- Remidus E. Kissassi, member of the African Union's Pan-African Parliament
- Jakaya Kikwete (born 1950), President of Tanzania from 2005 to 2015
- Freeman Mbowe (born 14 September 1961), leader of CHADEMA
- Bibi Titi Mohammed (1926–1963), founding member of the Tanganyika African National Union
- Gertrude Mongella (born 1945), president of the Pan-African Parliament
- William F. Shija (1947–2014), member of the National Assembly of Tanzania from 1990 to 2005
- Joseph Kakunda (born 1968), Minister of Trade, MP
- Bahati Ndingo (born 1985), Member of Parliament
- Tatu Mussa Ntimizi, Member of Parliament 1990–2010
- Rashid Abdalla Rashid (born 1973), Member of Parliament
- Mateo Qares, former cabinet minister

== Religion ==
- Laurean Rugambwa (1912–1997), cardinal, archbishop of Dar es Salaam
- Polycarp Pengo (born 1944), cardinal, archbishop of Dar es Salaam

== Royalty ==
- Mirambo (1840–1884), Nyamwezi royal
- Emily Ruete (Sayyida Salme) (1844–1924), Princess of Zanzibar
- Chief Mkwawa (1855–1898), Hehe chief
- Mangi Meli, Chagga royal who was executed by German colonialists in 1900
- Ngalami, Chagga royal who was executed by Germans in 1900
- Abdullah bin Khalifa of Zanzibar (1910–1963), tenth Sultan of Zanzibar
- Thomas Marealle (1915–2007), Paramount Chief of the Chagga people
- Rengua, Chagga royal of Machame
- Kimweri, King of the Shambaa
- Oswin Norbert John

== Scientists ==
- Myles Turner (1921–1984), warden of the Serengeti National Park
- Adelaida K. Semesi (1951–2001), marine scientist and mangrove ecologist
- Joyce Kinabo (born 1955), food scientist and researcher
- Felix Chami (born 1958), archaeologist known for his research on East African coastal archaeology and ancient Indian Ocean trade networks

== Sportspeople ==
- Hasheem Thabeet (born 1986), basketball player
- Martin Kolikoli (born 1989), basketball player
- Feisal Salum (born 1998), footballer
- Mbwana Ally Samatta (born 1993), football player
- Erasto Nyoni (born 2000), football player

== Writers ==
- Shaaban bin Robert (1909–1962), poet, author, essayist
- Mathias E. Mnyampala (1917–1969), lawyer, writer, and poet
- Julius Nyerere (1922–1999), politician, writer, philosopher
- Muhammed Said Abdulla (1918–1991), journalist and novelist
- Justinian Rweyemamu (1942–1982), economist, mathematician and writer
- Euphrase Kezilahabi (1944–2020), novelist and poet
- Amandina Lihamba (born 1944), playwright
- Leonard Shayo (born 1948), writer, mathematician, columnist
- Godfrey Mwakikagile (born 1949), writer, scholar and specialist in Africa Studies
- Richard Mabala (born 1949), writer of short stories, columnist and poet
- Julius Nyang'oro (born 1954), writer, political scientist and legal scholar
- Josiah Kibira (1960-2021), writer, director and businessman
- Christopher Mwashinga (born 1965), writer and poet
- Fadhy Mtanga (born 1981), writer, poet, photographer and blogger
- Joseph Marwa (born 1999), novelist, poet and actor
- Sandra A. Mushi, interior designer, published author, poet
- Nahida Esmail, writer of short stories and social activist
- Silas P.Zakayo (born 1984), writer, tutor, researcher and project planner.)
