= Queen Darleen =

Tanzanian singer

- Also known as: Queen Darleen
- Born: Mwanahawa Abdul Juma; 4 November 1985 (age 40); Kigoma, Tanzania
- Genres: Bongo flava, afro-pop
- Occupations: Singer rapper
- Instrument: Vocals
- Years active: 2000–present
- Label: WCB Wasafi

Mwanahawa Abdul Juma (born 4 November 1985) better known by her stage name Queen Darleen is a Tanzanian singer who is signed under WCB Wasafi.

== Biography ==
=== Early life ===
Darleen was born on 4 November 1985 in Kigoma Region as Mwanahawa Abdul Juma, Darleen is a daughter of Abdul Juma Issack (father) and a sister to Tanzanian singer Diamond Platnumz. Darleen is a Muslim by religion.

=== Personal life ===
Darleen was alleged dating fellow Tanzanian singer Alikiba, a speculation that she and Alikiba publicly denied revealing that they were just friends and business partners.

At the end of 2019, Darleen was married to Isihaka Mtoro as his second wife. Mtoro and Darleen separated in 2022.

Darleen has two children, a son and daughter with Isihaka.

== Music career ==
Darleen started her music career in the early 2000's as an independent artist featured in Dully Sykes' songs "Historia Ya Kweli" and "Sharifa" also "Mtoto wa Geti Kali" a song by Inspector Haroun.

Darleen released her first debut song as a professional singer "Wajua" featuring Alikiba in 2006 whom she addressed not to collaborate with, after rumors speculated that the two were in relationship. Many fans criticized her as she collaborated with Alikiba who is a long rival to her brother Diamond Platnumz. She released her first song "Maneno Maneno" in 2011 that won her the first award of her career at the 2012 Tanzania Music Awards for the best Ragga/Dancehall song.

=== WCB Wasafi ===
Darleen was signed to WCB Wasafi music label, a label owned by her step brother, Diamond Platnumz in 2017. She released her first song as an official WCB Wasafi artist "Kijuso" on February 17, 2017, featuring Rayvanny. The song was commercially successful. She later released other hits such as "Ntakufilisi", "Touch" and WCB's joint song "Zilipendwa" which was released on August 25, 2017. She is nicknamed "Wasafi's first lady" as she was the first female artist to be signed under WCB Wasafi.

== Awards and nominations ==
2012 Tanzania Music Awards

Year	Nominee / work	Award	Result
2012	Maneno Maneno ft Dully Sykes	Best Ragga/Dancehall song	Won

== Discography ==
2012

- Maneno Maneno

2017

- Zilipendwa (with Mbosso, Diamond Platnumz, Harmonize, Rich Mavoko, Lava Lava & Rayvanny)
- Ntakufilisi
- Kijuso ft Rayvanny

2019

- Mbali ft Harmonize
- Muhogo
- Tawire

2020

- Quarantine (with Diamond Platnumz, Zuchu, Lava Lava, Mbosso and Rayvanny)
- Bachel ft Lava Lava
