= Dar es Salaam Region =

Region of Tanzania

Dar es Salaam Mkoa wa Dar es Salaam
- Region
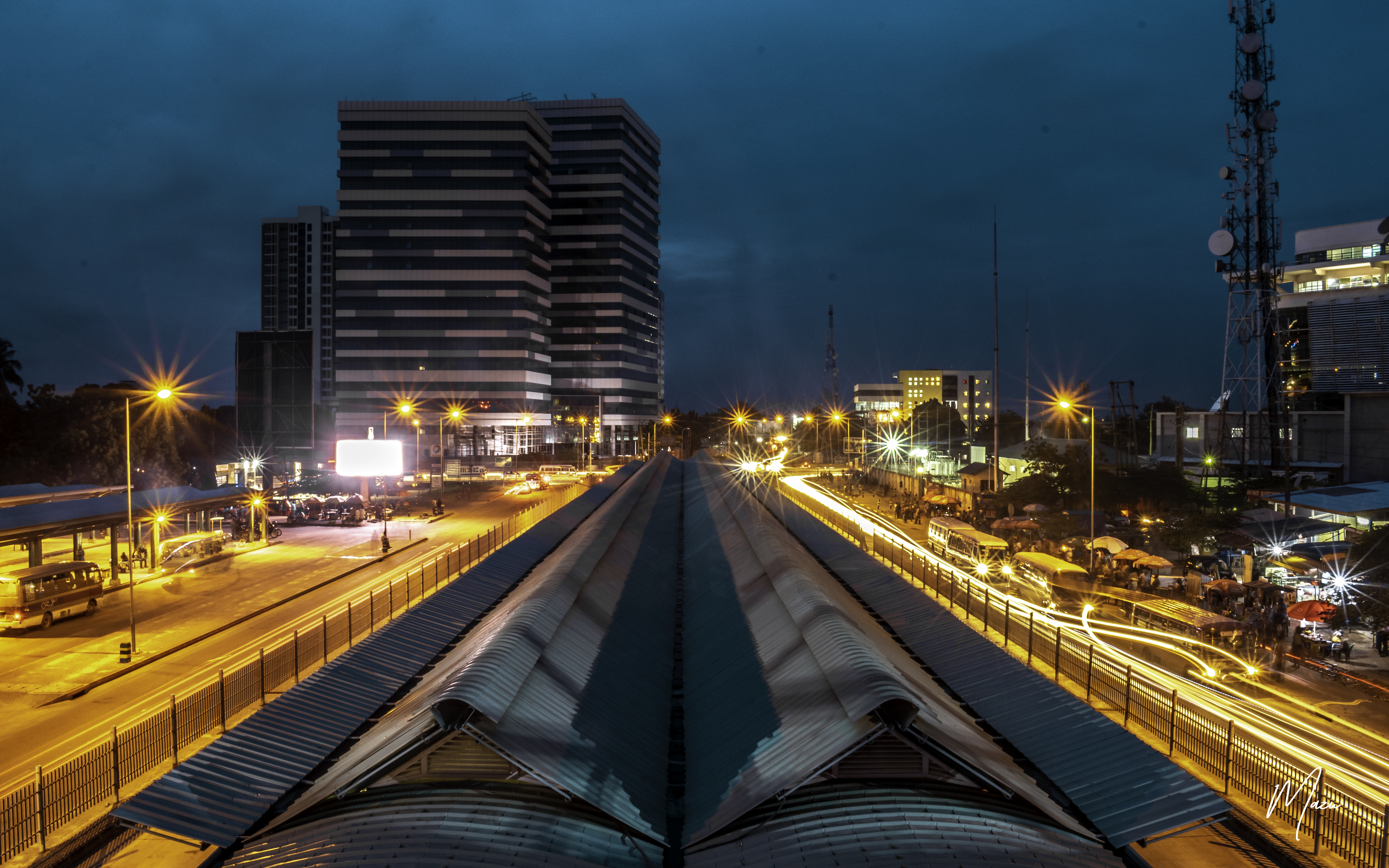
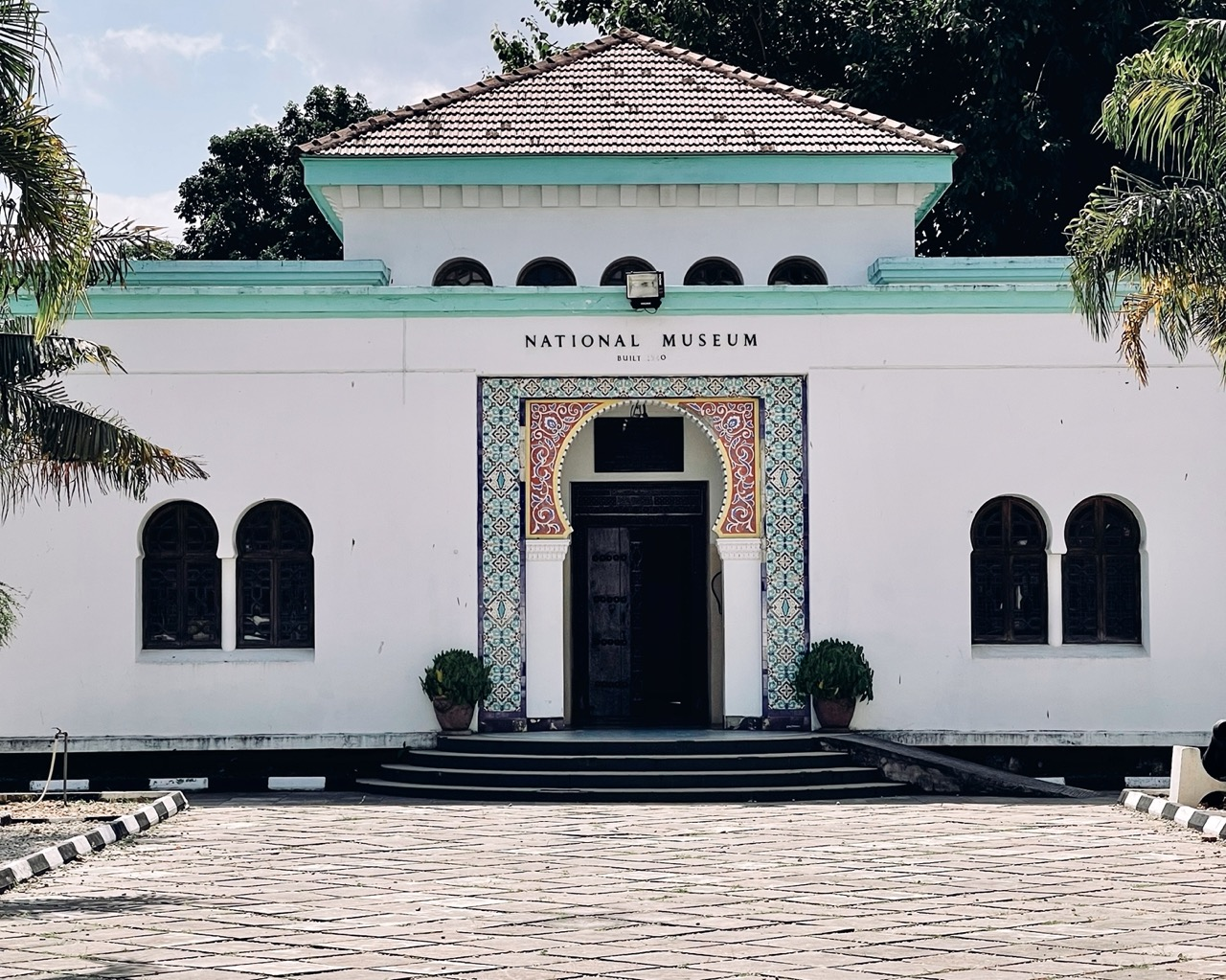
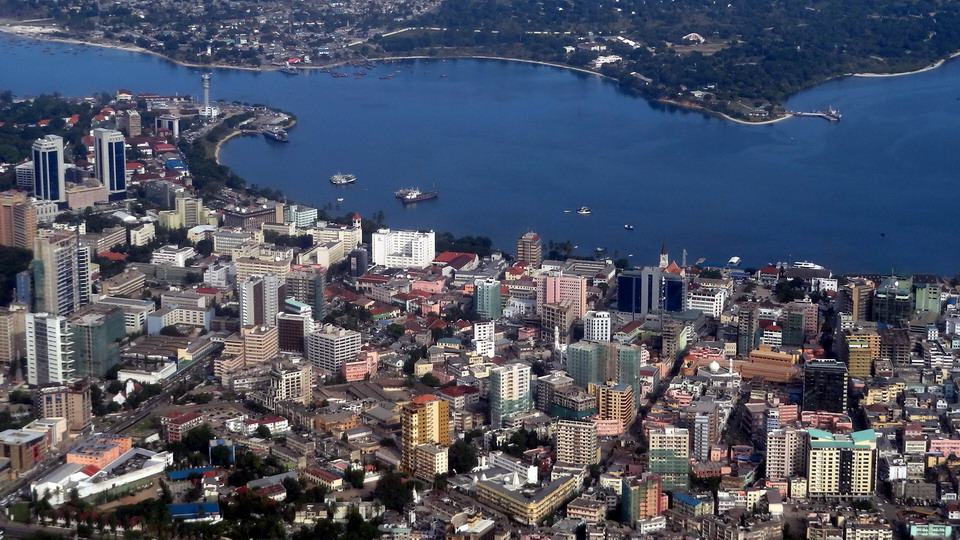
- From top to bottom: Dar Rapid Bus Transit System, National Museum of Tanzania, & Bird's eye view of Dar es Salaam
- Nicknames: The brain of Tanzania, Bongo
- Location in Tanzania
- Coordinates: 6°47′32.64″S 39°12′29.88″E
- Country: Tanzania
- Zone: Coastal
- Named for: City of Dar es Salaam
- Capital: Dar es Salaam
- Districts: List: Ilala District; Kinondoni District; Kigamboni District; Temeke District; Ubungo District

Government
  - Regional Commissioner: Amos Makalla

Area
  - Total: 1,599 km^{2} (617 sq mi)
  - Rank: 26th of 31
- Highest elevation (Pande Hill): 192 m (630 ft)

Population (2025)
  - Total: 10,599,999
  - Rank: 1st of 31
  - Density: 6,629/km^{2} (17,170/sq mi)
- Demonym: Darlite

Ethnic groups
  - Settler: Swahili
  - Native: Zaramo
- Time zone: UTC+3 (EAT)
- Postcode: 11xxx
- Area code: 026
- ISO 3166 code: TZ-02
- HDI (2021): 0.699 medium · 2nd
- Website: dsm.go.tz
- Symbols of Tanzania
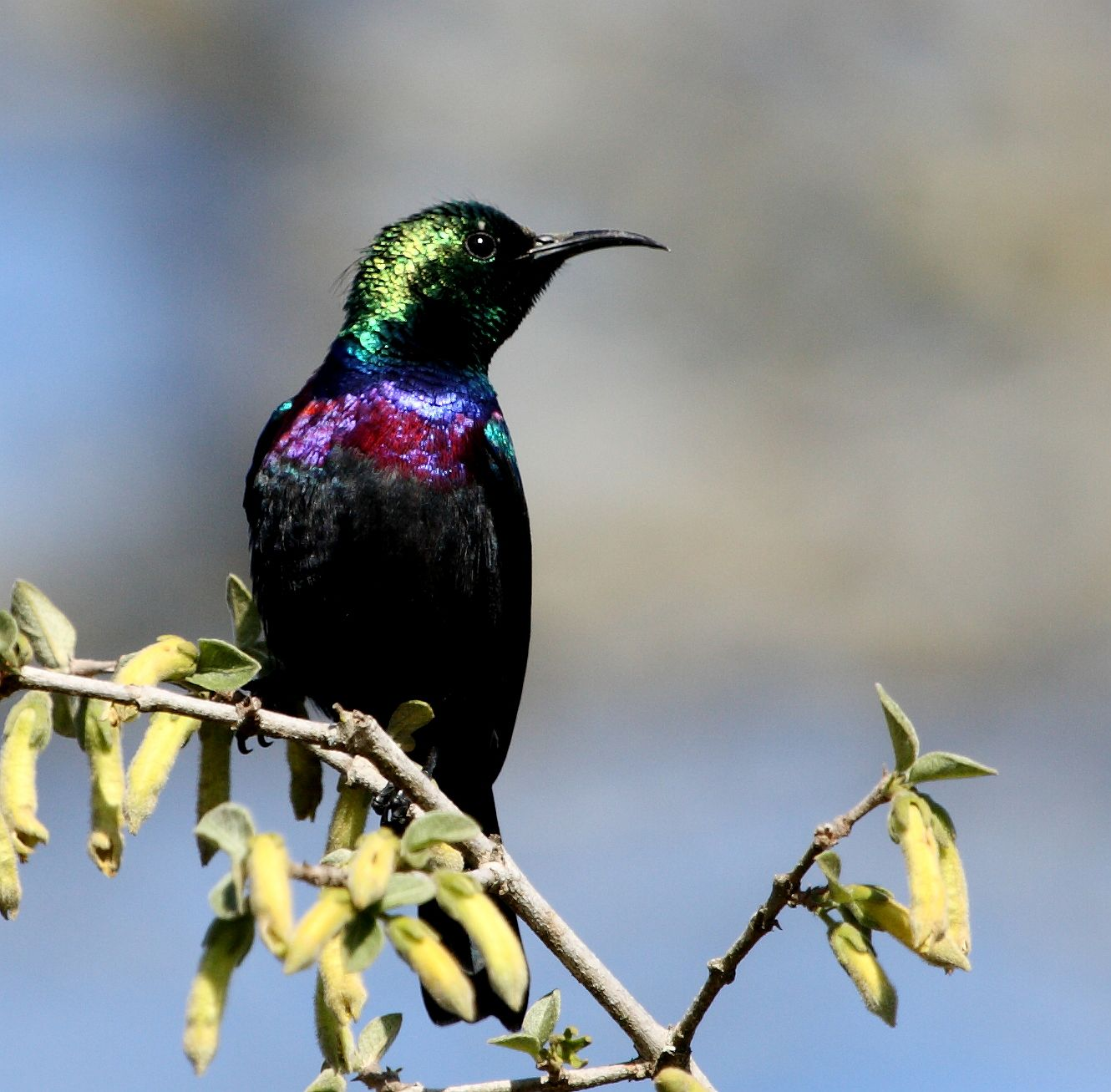
- Bird: Purple-banded sunbird

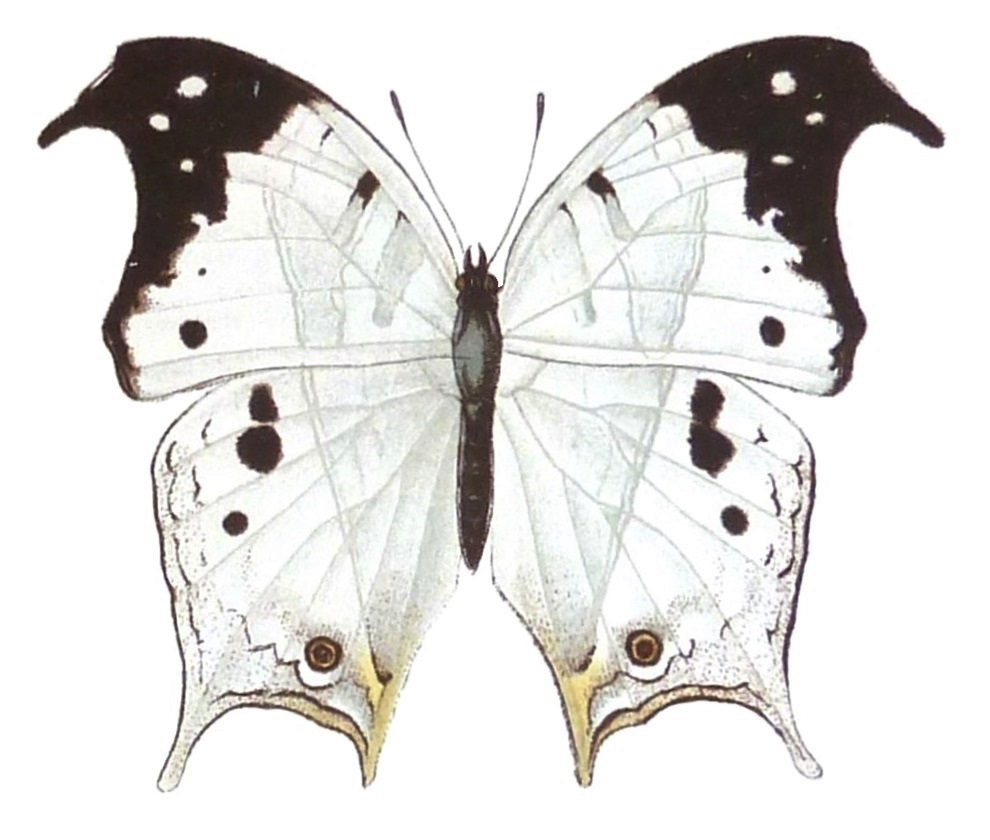
- Butterfly: Clouded mother of pearl

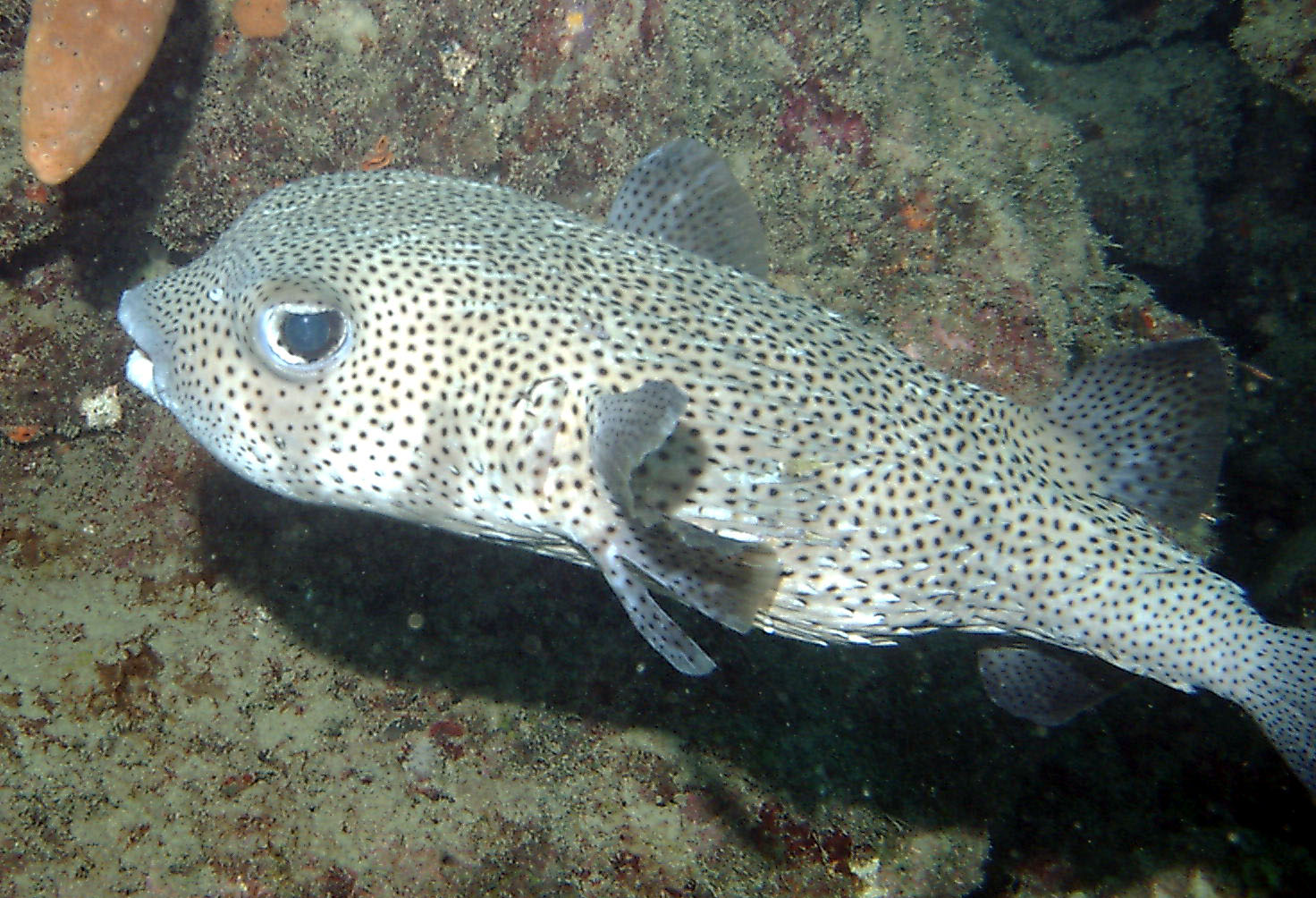
- Fish: Spot-fin porcupine fish
- Mammal: Dar es Salaam Pipistrelle
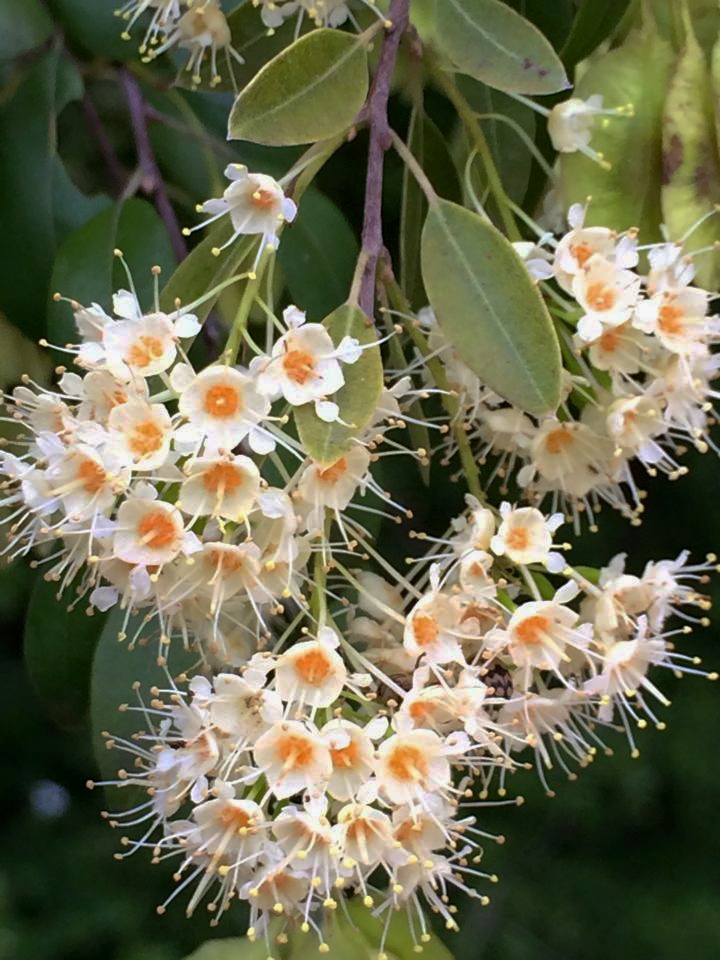
- Tree: Variable bushwillow

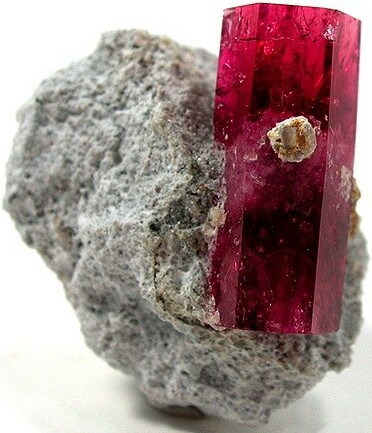
- Mineral: Beryl

Dar es Salaam Region (Swahili: Mkoa wa Dar es Salaam) is one of Tanzania's 31 administrative regions and is located on the east coast of the country. The region covers an area of 1,599 km^{2} (617 sq mi). The region is comparable in size to the combined land and water areas of the nation state of Mauritius. Dar es Salaam Region is bordered to the east by the Indian Ocean and is entirely surrounded by Pwani Region. The Pwani districts that border Dar es Salaam region are Bagamoyo District to the north, Kibaha Urban District to the west, Kisarawe District to the southwest and Mkuranga District to the south of the region. The region's seat (capital) is located inside the ward of Ilala. The region is named after the city of Dar es Salaam itself. The region is home to Tanzania's major finance, administration and industries, thus the making it the country's richest region. The region also has the second highest Human Development Index in the country after Mjini Magharibi. According to the 2022 census, the region has a total population of 5,383,728. The region has the highest population in Tanzania followed by Mwanza Region.

== History ==
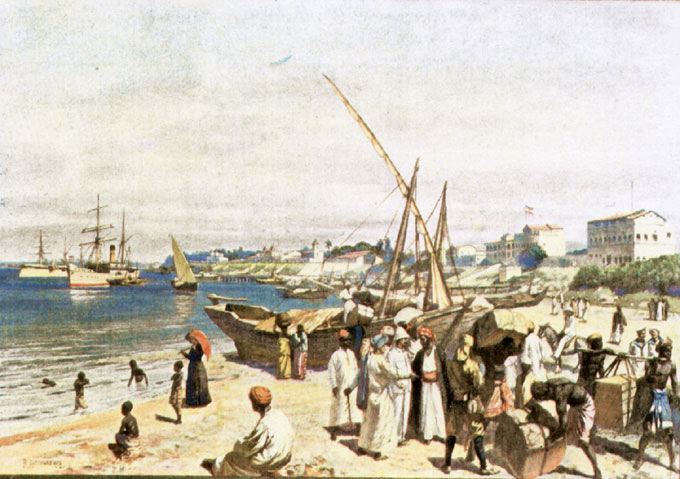
Image of the port of Dar es Salaam from the book Von Unseren Kolonien by Ottomar Beta in the year 1908

Mzizima (Mji Mzima), which means "a healthy town" in Kiswahili, was the original name of the area that is now known as Dar es Salaam, which dates back to 1857. Later, it was the location of plantations where maize, millet, and cassava were grown for the rapidly changing coastal region. Majid bin Said, the Sultan of Zanzibar (c. 1834–1870), officially founded the city Dar es Salaam, with an Arabic name that translates as "haven of peace," in 1866. The city saw a fall following the Sultan's death in 1870, but when the German East Africa Company opened a trade post there in 1887, the city's fortunes were turned around. Dar es Salaam developed become the colony's commercial and administrative hub as German colonial rule in East Africa progressed. In 1900, it was designated as the eastern end of the interior-bound Central Railway Line.

During World War I, British forces seized control of Dar es Salaam and German East Africa. They gave the colony a new name—Tanganyika—but kept Dar es Salaam as the seat of government. The city's informal residential segregation, which had started under the Germans, was made legal by the British AIso. They created two native sections (Kariakoo and Ilala) in addition to a European one (Oyster Bay). Asians eventually received their own area, namely Upanga.

After World War II, Dar es Salaam expanded quickly and soon became the epicenter of anti-colonial activity under the leadership of the Tanganyika African National Union (TANU), which was established there. Dar es Salaam served as Tanganyika's first capital when it gained its independence in 1961, and it kept that role when Tanganyika and Zanzibar united to form Tanzania in 1964. Although Dodoma in Tanzania's interior was designated as the country's new capital in 1973, the majority of the country's administrative offices are still located in Dar es Salaam.

== Geography ==
=== Geology ===
There are several flat tertiary, quaternary, and upper Mesozoic layers that make up the primary formations that support the city. Limestones, sandstones, intrusions of gypsum, coal, and salt, and they are all part of the Upper Mesozoic strata. Contagious lands near the shore strata is reasonably flat with visible N-S fractures forming a tiered landscape and a small east dip.

There are two main superficial geological deposits that make up the soils in the Dar es Salaam region. These include the sandy loam soils in high places, well-drained heavy clay waterlogged soils, and sandy loam and sandy clay soils. The lowlands are dominated by infertile sand, clay, and loamy soils, and in some places, there are peninsulas with stunning sand beaches. The middle plateau zone is made up of intermediate clay mixed with sandy soils, which are often moderately drained and leached. The sandy loam, well-drained, heavily weathered and leached sandy clay soils make up the uplands zone's soils.

The city boasts a 100-kilometer shoreline that stretches from the mouth of the Mpiji River in the north to the mouth of the Mzinga River in the south. There are eight islands off the shore of the region.

=== Hydrology ===
Four significant catchment areas for the rivers Mpiji, Msimbazi, Mzinga, and Kizinga are located in Dar es Salaam. While Mpiji is a seasonal river, Mzinga, Kizinga, and Msimbazi are all perennial rivers. Tegeta, Mbezi, Mlalakuwa, Kijitonyama, Sinza, and Tabata are only a few of the smaller, more sporadic rivers. These are essentially transient rivers that primarily act as Dar es Salaam City's drainage system. Some of the major rivers in Dar es Salaam are:

==== Kizinga and Mzinga Rivers ====
The Pugu Hills of Kisarawe District of Pwani Region, are traversed by the Kizinga and Mzinga river systems. They are composed of sandy sediments that favor infiltration and replenish the ground water to maintain flow throughout the dry season, and run toward the Indian Ocean in a northeasterly direction. Mzinga is 10.4 kilometers long and Kizinga is 17.5 kilometers long overall. The Mzinga and Kizinga rivers' water satisfies domestic drinking water regulations. In the Mbagala region, both rivers provide residential water supplies and are in continuous flow.

==== Mpiji River ====
The northern boundary between Dar es Salaam and Coast Region is defined by the Mpiji River. It is a seasonal river that is 12.7 kilometers long. The river is still less polluted than the other rivers that drain the city center despite the city's expansion toward Bagamoyo.

==== Msimbazi River ====
The Msimbazi River is around 35 kilometers long. It travels through the Pugu Forest Reserves and joins the Sinza, Ubungo, and Luhanga rivers as it flows eastward toward the Indian Ocean. For residents of Dar es Salaam and surrounding areas, it is a crucial source of water for drinking, bathing, supporting industry, agriculture, and environmental protection. However, illegal sewage systems and industrial effluents are endangering the ecological services provided by rivers. The river's functional advantages and even the customary practice of irrigation of vegetable fields are negatively impacted by heavy metal pollution from industries.

=== Climate ===
The climate in the city is a tropical coastal climate. Throughout the year, it is hot and humid, with an average temperature of 32 °C. The hottest months are October through March, when temperatures can reach 38 °C. Between May and August, temperatures hover around 25 °C. There are two main rain seasons in the Region: a short rain season from October to December and a lengthy rain season from March to May. The average annual rainfall is 1000 mm (lowest 600 mm and highest 1300 mm). The city is separated into three ecological zones: upland, middle plateau, and lowlands. Coastal shrubs, Miombo forest, coastal marshes, and mangrove trees make up the majority of the natural vegetation.

== Economy ==
Dar es Salaam is Tanzania's principal economic engine, serving as an administrative, industrial, fisheries, and commercial center (including mining trade). The city is home to over 40% of the country's total industrial manufacturing units and produces approximately 45 percent of Tanzania's gross industrial manufacturing output. The city has a large harbor and is a major manufacturing center. Dar es Salaam attracts both formal and informal trade and transportation activity. After structural adjustment policies were implemented in 1985, service sector investment and civil service employment fell. Rising rates of unemployment and underemployment contributed to the expansion of the informal sector and informal settlements.

According to the 2005 Property and Business Formalisation Programme, also referred to as Mkurabita, approximately 98 percent of enterprises are informal and operate outside of the legal system. In other words, the private sector is predominantly a part of the informal sector. Furthermore, it has been stated that approximately 89 percent of all property in Tanzania is owned outside of the legal system, not linked to formal domestic and international markets. Excessive and cumbersome restrictions prohibit Tanzanian small firms from transitioning from informal to formal activities. Tanzania's government has attempted measures to encourage the informal sector to enter the formal market, but these have generally failed.

=== Infrastructure ===
The Dar es Salaam Water and Sewerage Authority (DAWASA) is in charge of the city's water supply and distribution. Only 25% of the city's people have access to this water, while the other 75% live in unplanned and unserviced townships. Around 80% of residents in these settlements utilize pit latrines, which are typically poorly constructed and poorly maintained. Pit latrines, which are commonly found in densely populated regions, are prone to flooding during the rainy season due to a lack of drainage systems, particularly in squatter zones. This increases the likelihood of significant health issues. Poor sewerage treatment and solid waste disposal are primarily the result of ineffective council management.

Julius Nyerere International Airport serves the Ilala Municipal Council as the primary entry point for incoming and outgoing aviation passengers. Tanzania Airport Authority is in charge of the airport.

=== Public transportation ===
The major mode of public transportation is the 'daladala' bus. The majority of them are registered and privately operated daladala in services with a seating capacity of 25-32 people. In Dar es Salaam, public transportation is unreliable, uncomfortable, and dangerous. The maximum daily passenger capacity is predicted to be 9.9 million passenger journeys per day, based on the overall size of the urban transportation fleet.

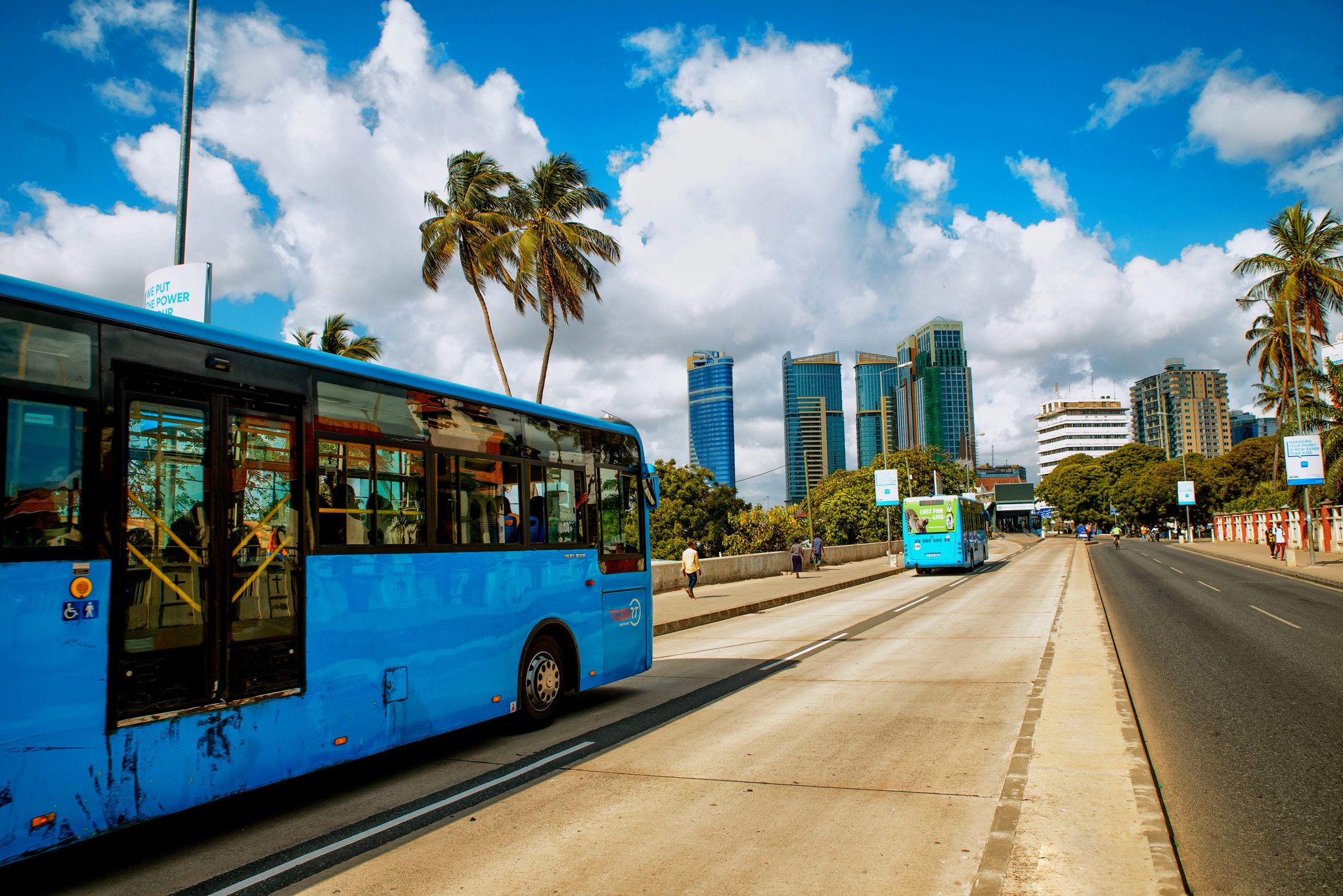
UDART - Dar Rapid Transport Buses

The city's road networks were planned and built by German and British colonial entities. Prior to WWII, private autos and non-motorized transport (NMT) modes such as walking and cycling dominated urban travel. As Dar es Salaam's population rose, so did the demand for public transportation, particularly among those who lived distant from their places of employment. Prior to 1992, there had been only minor improvements in city infrastructure. Over a period of more than 15 years, city planning and administration showed their inability to guide urban development. Thirty-three percent of all mobility in the city is done on foot, yet NMT has been overlooked in the broader transportation system, and the requisite facilities to support NMT are sometimes missing. City streets, for example, lack walkways, bicycle paths, zebra crossings, footbridges, and pedestrian signs and markings. As a result, those who rely on NMT must share the same space as those who use motorized transportation, resulting in an increase in the number of accidents on city streets.

=== Pollution ===
==== Air quality ====
The metropolis is suffering from severe air pollution as a result of the city's unchecked geographical development and rapid economic growth. Urban air quality monitoring has revealed elevated levels of pollutants in various Dar es Salaam neighborhoods, including Gerezani and Kariakoo, which are beyond the WHO pollution recommendations, making them the two wards with the worst air quality. High levels of inhalable particulate matter (PM10) in particular were detected. Increased traffic volume, insufficient parking spaces for heavy-duty trucks, industrial activity, and the poor condition of vehicles and roads have all been identified as major contributors to the deterioration of air quality in these locations.

Motor vehicles are a significant source of pollution in Dar es Salaam, according to research on air quality monitoring. Near major roads such the Morogoro Road, Julius Nyerere Road, Bagamoyo Road, and Nelson Mandela Road, residents may be exposed to long-term quantities of nitrogen dioxide (NO_{2}), PM10, and other air pollutants that exceed WHO standards. Additionally, research indicates that the city's worsening air quality is related to an increase in the quantity and density of high-rise structures, which prevents pollution dispersion through natural air circulation.

==== Water Pollution ====
The quality of abstracted water varies per city district. Some locations, including those near the Msimbazi, Sinza, and Ubungo rivers, are reported to have ground water that is dark in color. The water at the estuary close to the Mlalakuwa River is reputed to be saltier and can exceed 3000 S/cm. This may occur occasionally as a result of saltwater intrusion or salt that has been embedded into limestone formations. The main factor contributing to the decline in the quality of urban surface water is insufficient pollution control measures of anthropogenic activity. Gray water discharge into the environment, in particular, is caused by inadequate waste water treatment, which significantly worsens the quality of both surface water and ground water (aquifers). Numerous national and international corporations release untreated liquid waste into rivers, creeks, and streams, as well as estuaries that eventually drain into the ocean. The Mzinga River receives effluent from several enterprises.

Pit latrines and septic tanks are used by 90% of people in Dar es Salaam to store and dispose of liquid waste. The potential of infections and other contaminants contaminating groundwater is significant due to the normally high groundwater table. In unplanned settlements, illegal trash disposal in open areas and drainage ditches is a prevalent practice. When pits overflow and solid waste is dumped into rivers and drains during the wet seasons, the situation gets worse. High levels of microbial contamination of groundwater extracted from shallow wells situated in populated urban areas have been observed in studies. Major areas affected include Majumbasita, Kiwalani, Mwananyamala, Mbagala, and others.

Urban agriculture has been practiced along numerous riverbanks in Dar es Salaam for a very long time. In one study, lead levels in all vegetables from Tabata, Buguruni, and Sinza were found to be higher than the WHO-recommended value, while lead, chromium, zinc, and copper levels in the soil were also found to be excessive. Traffic is a major contributor to lead contamination, and average traffic density and soil lead levels are strongly correlated. Hydrocarbon pollution of the soil is also a result of traffic.

Large amounts of oil are handled by ships at the port, and oil leaks from the TAZAMA pipeline have happened frequently. Dar es Salaam is home to a number of other hydrocarbon-based industrial operations, such as the Tanzania International Petroleum Reserves Limited (TIPER) near Vijibweni, Kigamboni MC. The entire city of Dar es Salaam has both formal and impromptu garages, which contribute to the hydrocarbon contamination of the soil. Except for the Mtoni landfill, there is little to no leachate or gas control on landfills in Dar es Salaam. Therefore, it is anticipated that landfill sites, both past and present, will be a substantial source of pollution. It is impossible to overstate the dangers of substantial biochemical groundwater pollution in the vicinity of dumpsites.

=== Informal settlements ===
Seventy percent of Dar es Salaam's population lives in unplanned settlements, and fifty percent of those people have an average daily income of less than $1 USD. This information serves as a crucial springboard for talking about the city's susceptibility to climate change and possible adaptation measures. There are many people that are socially, economically, and environmentally vulnerable, living in subpar homes, mostly on property that is exposed to many hazards. The city's sanitation systems also have serious flaws. According to household surveys, 37% of homes in the city utilized pour-flush latrines, compared to 29% of families that used conventional flush toilets.

However, 18% of the homes used Ventilated Improved Pit (VIP) latrines and 6% used unimproved pit latrines, accounting for 34% of all households utilizing latrines. To address the challenges posed by climate change and to meet the requirements of low-income urban people, adaptive approaches must take these concerns into account.

A one-meter rise in sea level would exacerbate the ecological issues already present in Dar es Salaam city's coastal zones through higher rates of coastal erosion, more persistent flooding and the loss of wetlands, increased salinization of groundwater and soil, and increased inflow of various pollutants. Human activities such as the removal of salt pans, the cutting of poles from mangroves, the destruction of coral reefs for fishing, the extraction of sand for building, and the fabrication of lime from coral rocks all contribute to this subsidence. utilized by the household. Numerous people were consuming untreated water from boreholes and streams in the high-density areas of Ubungo, Manzese, Sinza, Kawe, Buguruni, and Temeke as well as the central business district.

According to a number of reports, the early March 2008 torrential rains resulted in significant costs for society and the economy, including flooding of homes, damage to smaller bridges and roads, and the deaths of numerous children. In informal settlements that are regarded as disadvantaged places, the effects of these catastrophes are felt most acutely.

=== Planned settlements ===
Of the entire land in Dar es Salaam, 66.8% is used for residential purposes. Planned and informal land uses can be used to categorize residential land use. In Dar es Salaam, planned land makes up 18.6% of the total amount of land, while informal settlements make up 48.2%. Low density, medium density, and high density residential areas make up the planned residential and informal settlements. Formalized, regularized informal, upgraded settlements, consolidating informal settlements, consolidated informal, and scattered informal are the categories for informal sentiments.

In Dar es Salaam, low-density constructions take up 15038.9 hectares of space. This group of residential complexes includes the colonial-era planned communities of Gerezani, Kurasini, Msasani Peninsular, Oyster Bay, Kawe, Ada Estate, and Regent Estate.

Before 1940, the Railways Corporation built Kurasini for European port authorities and Gerezani for their European employees. For representatives of European governments, Oyster Bay was set aside. These areas are home to a wide range of housing types, such as detached two to three story villas and bungalows that were initially built for European government officials on large plots of land measuring about 2,000 square meters, which promote sprawling urban development patterns. Multi-story commercial buildings and residential flats are now being built in these localities. The majority of these locations are evolving into mixed-use communities that combine residential activities with commercial, warehousing, and occasionally industrial activity as well.

Particularly after the government sold the government houses to the residents who were public servants, the areas of Oyster Bay, Masaki, and Masani underwent a tremendous densification process. The Oyster Bay/Masaki Redevelopment Scheme was created by the Kinondoni Municipal Council to direct the process of change in these areas. Mbezi Beach, Tegeta, Mlalakua Salasala, and Jangwani Beach are more contemporary examples of medium- and low-density residential towns that were designed, commencing in the 1980s. These sections were created as a part of the Oyster Bay-style extension area for high-income housing. Medium and low-density residential plots are also planned for in the 20,000 plot project zones.

The distribution of these places throughout the city is unequal. As isolated clusters of three to six storey residential apartment buildings within low-rise residential projects, they were occasionally planned primarily by the National Housing Corporation (NHC) and other parastatal agencies in the 1960s and 1970s. Ilala, Mwenge, Ubungo, Tandika, Keko, Buguruni, Chang'ombe, and TAZARA are dominant regions in this category. Such apartment complexes have led to considerably higher land coverage and floor area ratios where they are grouped closely together. This group includes typical Mwenge apartment buildings, which have five stories and a 20,510 square meter site.

Low-rise Swahili homes can be seen in Kinondoni, Magomeni, Ilala, and Temeke, as well as other high-density residential areas. The gridiron shape of the street network in Magomeni and Ilala illustrates the type of neighborhood planning that was done for Africans during the colonial era. However, during the past three decades, these settlements have begun to change from primarily Swahili-style homes to apartment buildings, one of which serves as an overflow region for the expanding commercial, office, and residential needs of the city center.

=== Parks and open areas ===
There aren't many open green spaces for enjoyment in the City right now. The majority of the areas once designated for such uses have long since been infiltrated or formally converted to residential construction, auto repair shops, schools, warehouses, showrooms, office buildings, or religious structures. Local government offices and other activities have long since replaced the few social halls and community centers where locals once gathered for amusement and other social activities.

In the absence of such places, the majority of the city's adult population socialize in the numerous pubs that are dispersed across the city and mostly found in residential neighborhoods. This results in common annoyances like loud music and unpleasant behavior from patrons who have consumed alcohol. The Mnazimoja Grounds, the Gymkhana Grounds, Kidongo Chekurdu, Jangwani Grounds, and the Uhuru Stadium in the municipality of Ilala; Mwembe Yanga, Mbagala Zakheer, and the National Stadium in the municipality of Temeke; and the Biafra Grounds in the municipality of Kinondoni; are the principal public open spaces and recreational grounds in Dar es Salaam. There are two botanical gardens, one of which is situated at Magomeni and the other at the Karimjee Jeevanjee grounds in the city center.

Ocean Road, Coco Beach, Kawe Beach, Kigamboni, Dege Beach, Mbweni, and Msasani Peninsula beaches are among the few public beaches. These public parks and open spaces take up 1,278.5 hectares of land, or 0.8% of Dar es Salaam's total land area.

== Population and demographics ==
The area that is now Dar es Salaam Region is the ancestral home to the Zaramo people who are the majority ethnic group in the outskirts of the region. As the region holding the highest population in the country, the region is home to every tribe in the country due to mass migration over the years as well as the largest foreign immigrant population in the country. The region is home to all of the international embassies in the country. The region's city is one of the fastest-growing cities in the world. According to the 2022 national census, the Dar es Salaam Region had a population of 5,383,728. With 2,600,018 males (48.3%) and 2,783,710 females (51.7%). The city's population grew from 67,227 in 1948 to 4,364,541 in 2012. (NBS, 2012). Dar es Salaam's population is anticipated to reach 15.5 million by 2030 and 37.9 million by 2050. One of the most visible effects of urbanisation is the rising demand for housing. Seventy-five percent of the city's home building occurs on unplanned and unserviced land and is conducted through informal land acquisition. To create low-income housing for the needy, the government collaborates with land development partners such as the National Housing Corporation. As things stand, the construction program funded by the government and the NHC is still prohibitively expensive for low-income residents, fueling the growth of informal settlements.

== Districts ==
Dar es Salaam City Council is led by a mayor and an executive director/city director. Waste Management and Sanitation, Engineering and Fire Services, Urban Planning, Transportation, Environment, Health, and Finance and Administration are all under the control of the city director. Kinondoni, Ilala, and Temeke are the three municipalities/districts within the city government. A District Commissioner oversees each district. The city council is a democratic institution and is in charge of developing the city's strategic framework and drafting city legislation.

Each municipality is represented by a council, which is led by a Mayor and an Executive Director. The Minister of Regional Administration and Local Government appoints and holds accountable three municipal directors. Ward and sub-ward (Mtaa) leaders, as well as villages (vijiji) and hamlets (vitongoji) in some places, are appointed by and accountable to the Municipal Director at the lowest administrative levels.

Property taxes, local service levies, advertisement and billboard levies, market fees, grants, donations, government subsidies, and community contributions are among the key sources of funding. The Procurement Act and the Public Finance Management Act provide instructions on the use and reporting of public funds. Previously, financial responsibility was hampered since various regulations applied to different companies and was narrowly focused on expenditure control.

In the year 2000, the city council decentralized its functions into three municipalities: Kinondoni, Ilala, and Temeke. Municipalities now have complete policy and legislative implementation authority. Planning and management were done collaboratively.

Dar es Salaam Region is divided into five administrative districts, four of which are governed by municipal councils (Note: Apart from Ilala District, which has been governed by a city council since 2021 after the dissolution of the Dar es Salaam City Council.) that are affiliated with the city's suburbs or wards.

Districts of Dar es Salaam Region
District	Population (2022)	Area km^{2}
Ilala District	1,649,912	210
Kinondoni District	982,328	527
Temeke District	1,346,674	656
Kigamboni District	317,902	N/A
Ubungo District	1,086,912	N/A
Dar es Salaam Region	5,383,728	1,393

== Education and health ==
=== Education ===
As of 2022, there were 987 schools in Dar es Salaam Region, 663 of are primary schools and 324 are secondary schools. The University of Dar es Salaam, the Ardhi University, the Open University of Tanzania, the International Medical and Technological University, and the Hubert Kairuki Memorial University in Mikocheni are the city's five universities.

=== Health ===
In terms of healthcare facilities, as of 2022 Dar es Salaam Region is home to 4 national hospitals, 38 hospitals, 58 health centers and 436 clinics. Dar es Salaam is served by Lugalo Hospital, Mwananyamala Government Hospital, Mnazi Mmoja Hospital, Amana Hospital, and Muhimbili National Hospital. The Health Sector Reform Programme (HSRP) improved public-private collaboration in health-care delivery. Dar es Salaam currently has 24 privately owned and registered laboratories, 489 registered medical stores, 400 registered pharmacies, and over 100 unregistered medical stores and laboratories.

== Notable people from Dar es Salaam Region ==
- Sandra Aikaruwa Mushi, poet
- David Adjaye, Ghanaian architect
- Said Salim Bakhresa, billionaire
- Sajjad Fazel, medical writer
- Bibi Titi Mohammed, founding mother
- Nahida Esmail, writer and poet
- Raphael Bocco, footballer
- Erasto Nyoni, footballer
- Hasheem Thabeet, basketball player
- Martin Kolikoli, basketball player
- Mbwana Ally Samatta, footballer
- Betty Boniphace, model
- Jihan Dimack, Miss Grand International 2026, model, actor
- Abby Chams, artist
- Dully Sykes, musician
- Gigy Money, socialite
- Francis Cheka, boxer
- Yvonne Cherrie, actress
- Chipo Chung, Zimbabwean actress
- Darassa, musician
- Faisal Devji, Islamic historian
- Diamond Platnumz, musician
- Frank Domayo, footballer
- Nahreel, musical artist
- Paul Lukinda, aquaculture expert
