= A Boy from Tandale =

- Cover art of "A Boy from Tandale"

Studio album by Diamond Platnumz
- Released: March 14, 2018
- Studios: Various: Wasafi Records; Burn Records; Abby Daddy; The Industry; S2kizzy
- Genres: Bongo Flava; afro-pop; dance-pop
- Length: 60:08
- Labels: Universal Music Group; Songa Music
- Producers: Laizer Classic; Nahreel; Sheddy Clever; Abby Daddy; S2Kizzy

Singles from A Boy from Tandale
- 1. "Number One Remix" Released: January 6, 2014; 2. "Nana" Released: May 29, 2015; 3. "Kidogo" Released: July 12, 2016; 4. "Marry You" Released: February 2, 2017; 5. "Fire" Released: June 21, 2017; 6. "Eneka" Released: July 10, 2017; 7. "Hallelujah" Released: September 28, 2017; 8. "Waka" Released: December 7, 2017; 9. "African Beauty" Released: March 15, 2018; 10. "Iyena" Released: May 31, 2018; 11. "Baila" Released: July 12, 2018

A Boy from Tandale is the third studio album by Tanzanian singer Diamond Platnumz - following Kamwambie (2010) and Lala Salama (2012). It was released on March 14, 2018, by Universal Music Group. After he signed with the label in 2017, Diamond began working on the songs which would be used on the album. Musically, A Boy from Tandale is an afro-pop, Bongo Flava album that displays influences of music from West of Africa - especially Nigeria.

The title of the album refers to Tandale, in the Kinondoni district of the Dar es Salaam Region of Tanzania, Tandale being Diamond Platnumz's birthplace. The album consists of eighteen tracks, eleven of them already released as singles. The album features several artists from the United States such as Ne-Yo ("Marry You"), Morgan Heritage ("Hallelujah"), Rick Ross ("Waka") and Omarion ("African Beauty"). From Africa, the artistes featured on the album are Vanessa Mdee ("Far Away"), Rayvanny ("Iyena"), Jah Prayzah ("Amanda"), Mr. Flavour ("Nana"), Young Killer ("Pamela"), P-Square ("Kidogo"), Tiwa Savage ("Fire") and Richie Mavoko ("Sijaona").

Most of the tracks from the album were produced by his label producer Laizer Classic who also served as the executive producer for the album. The album was launched in Kenya. Songa Music of Kenya sponsored the launch.

Two songs from the album were banned by the National Arts Council Tanzania (BASATA), the songs including "Waka" and "Hallelujah" citing "obscene lyrics" issues.

== Track-listing ==
1. "Hallelujah" (feat. Morgan Heritage)
2. "Waka" (feat. Rick Ross)
3. "Baikoko"
4. "Pamela" (feat. Young Killer)
5. "Iyena" (feat. Rayvanny)
6. "Kosa Langu"
7. "Nikuone"
8. "Baila" (feat. Miri Ben-Ari)
9. "Sijaona"
10. "African Beauty" (feat. Omarion)
11. "Eneka"
12. "Fire" (feat. Tiwa Savage)
13. "Marry You" (feat. Ne-Yo)
14. "Number One" (feat. Davido) [Remix]
15. "Nana" (feat. Flavour)
16. "Kidogo" (feat. P-Square)
17. "Amanda" (feat. Jah Prayzah)
18. "Far Away" (feat. Vanessa Mdee)
