= The African Princess =

- Cover art of "The African Princess"

Studio album by Nandy
- Released: November 9, 2018
- Studio: Various: Kimambo Beats
- Genre: Bongo Flava; afro-pop; dance-pop
- Length: 44:00
- Label: Epic Records
- Producer: Kimambo Beats; Ema Beats; Ringtone

Singles from The African Princess
- 1. "One Day" Released: February 16, 2017; 2. "Wasikudaganye" Released: July 7, 2017; 3. "Kivuruge" Released: December 19, 2017; 4. "Aibu" Released: October 27, 2018; 5. "Ninogeshe" Released: May 3, 2018

The African Princess is the first studio album from Tanzanian singer Nandy. It was released on November 9, 2018, by Epic Records. The album was launched in Nairobi, Kenya, and was sponsored by Tanzanian telecommunications company Halotel. She made her entrance into the album launch with best friend Willy Paul on her side.

The African Princess is an album which showcases the way in which several music genres have influenced, and been 'swahilised', to form Bongo Flava.

Despite often being referred to as the 'Queen of Bongo Flava', the title of the album instead refers to her as 'The Princess', testament to the growth she still hopes to make in terms of her career. This is despite her being considered a powerhouse in the African music industry, having amassed more than 100 million views on YouTube over her career. The album consists of 13 tracks, and markedly no features. Five of the tracks on the album were released as singles prior to the release of the album. The album, including its singles, received more than 40 million streams across various platforms.

The album was co-produced by her regular collaborator, Kimambo Beats, along with Ringtone and Ema Beats of Tanzania, and was executive produced by her mentor and former fiancée, the late Ruge Mutahaba, who died shortly before the date of the album launch.

== Track listing ==
1. "Powerful"
2. "Kongoro"
3. "Thamani"
4. "Aibu"
5. "Hazipo"
6. "Nyanyasaa"
7. "Nigande"
8. "Baikoko"
9. "One Day"
10. "Wasikudanye"
11. "Kivuruge"
12. "Ninogeshe"
