= Waka =

Waka may refer to:

== Culture and language ==
- Waka (canoe), canoes of the Māori of New Zealand
  - Waka ama, a Polynesian outrigger canoe
  - Māori migration canoes, the ocean-going canoes that brought the Māori people to New Zealand
  - Waka taua, a Māori war canoe
  - Anaweka waka, remnants of an oceangoing waka found on the South Island of New Zealand
  - Chatham Island waka, remnants of an oceangoing waka found on Chatham Island
- Waka huia, a Māori treasure box
- Waka (mythology), a Hawaiian lizard goddess
- Waka language, an Adamawa language of Nigeria
- Huaca or wak'a, in the Quechua language, a class of sacred objects

== Arts and entertainment ==
- Waka (poetry), a genre of Japanese poetry
- WAKA (TV), a television station licensed to Selma, Alabama, US
- Waka music, a musical genre from Yorubaland of Nigeria
- Waga sculpture or waka, a type of Ethiopian memorial statue
- "Waka" (Diamond Platnumz song), 2017
- "Waka", song by 6ix9ine from Dummy Boy, 2018
- Waka, a character in the video game Ōkami

== Places ==
- Waka, Texas, a community in the Texas Panhandle
- El Perú (Maya site) or Waka', Maya ruins in Guatemala
- Waka National Park, a national park in central Gabon
- Waka P'iqi, a mountain in Bolivia

== People ==
- Masayasu Wakabayashi (born 1978), Japanese comedian and television presenter
- Takashi Wakasugi, Japanese comedian
- Waka Attewell, New Zealand cinematographer
- Waka Flocka Flame (born 1986), American rapper
- Waka Goi (born 1968), Papua New Guinea politician
- Waka Inoue (born 1980), Japanese tarento and actress
- Waka Kobori (born 2000), Japanese swimmer
- Waka Nathan (born 1940), New Zealand rugby union player
- Neil Waka, New Zealand broadcaster and journalist
- Waka Tsukiyama, is an American-born Japanese professional wrestler
- Yamada Waka (1879–1957), Japanese feminist and social reformer

== Other uses ==
- Cyclone Waka, a 2001 tropical cyclone
- World Adult Kickball Association

== See also ==
- Waka Waka (disambiguation), including uses of Wakawaka
- Wakka (disambiguation)
- Wacka (disambiguation)
- Wacca (disambiguation)
- WACA (disambiguation)
