= WACA =

WACA may refer to:

- WACA (AM), a radio station (900 AM) licensed to Laurel, Maryland, United States
- WDON (AM), a radio station (1540 AM) licensed to Wheaton, Maryland, which held the call sign WACA from 1997 to 2021
- WACA Ground, a stadium in Perth, the home of the Western Australian Cricket Association
- West African Court of Appeal, a British colonial appellate court
- Waca Lake, a lake in the United States
- WA Cricket formerly the Western Australian Cricket Association, Australian cricket governing body
- Wide area circumferential ablation, a surgical procedure of the heart
- World Affairs Councils of America, an American international affairs organization

== See also ==
- Wacca (disambiguation)
- Wacka (disambiguation)
- Waka (disambiguation)
- Wakka (disambiguation)
- Waka Waka (disambiguation)
