= Kezia Asiedua Sanie =

Ghanaian Lawyer and philanthropist

Kezia Asiedua Sanie is a Ghanaian lawyer, social entrepreneur, and youth advocate. She is the founder and president of For The Future (FTF) Ghana, a Non-Governmental Organization (NGO) dedicated to addressing child poverty and educational inequalities in Ghana. Sanie also serves as a trustee for the Head of State Awards Scheme in Ghana.

== Early life and education ==
Sanie had her basic education at God's Grace International School. She attended Wesley Girls' High School in Cape Coast. She obtained her Bachelor of Laws Degree from the University of Ghana, Legon, in 2022. She was a professional law student at the Ghana School of Law and was called to the Ghanaian bar in October 2024.

== Career ==
Sanie realized her calling to help others at a young age and had always wanted to start a charity since childhood, speaking about it as early as primary school. While still in her first year of high school at Wesley Girls' High School, she and some friends started a project to help needy children. This small charity eventually grew into a fully structured and registered NGO called For The Future (FTF) Ghana, where majority of the pioneers and members are students in various universities in Ghana.

Through her work with FTF Ghana, Kezia has led initiatives that have impacted over 5,000 children across Ghana and Nigeria. The organization has renovated a school block, provided teaching and learning materials to over 3000 vulnerable children, and increased access to education and quality healthcare to numerous underprivileged children across the country.

On Friday, August 11, 2023, Kezia was sworn in as the youngest member of the 13-member board of trustees for the Head of State Awards Scheme at the Jubilee House in Accra by President Nana Addo Dankwa Akufo-Addo.

The Head of State Award Scheme (also known globally as the Duke of Edinburgh’s International Award) is a non-formal education and learning program that challenges, empowers, and recognizes young people aged 14 to 24.

Other members of the board include Harry B. Sintim-Aboagye (chairman), Gladys Amoah (vice-chairman), Kwadwo Addeah-Safo (secretary), Daniel A Adotey, Hajia Muniratu Lamptey, Dr Juliet Yayra Tengey, Ohenewa Sakyi Bekoe, Stephen Oduro, Pius Enam Hadzide, Gifty Sakyi-Bremansu, Abena A Antwi, and Peter A. Anum (chief executive).

In May 2025, she will join the 54th St. Gallen Symposium as a speaker.

== Awards and recognition ==
Sanie has been recognized as a changemaker and rising leader. She was selected to participate in the 10th Anniversary of the World Bank Group's Youth Summit at the World Bank Headquarters in Washington, D.C. In July 2023, she was named a Top 50 finalist for Global Teacher Prize. She also became a Top 10 finalist for the $100,000 Chegg.org Global Student Prize and was the only Ghanaian woman to make the Top 50 list (with two Ghanaian men) and the only Ghanaian to make the Top 10 list. She is also part of the Global Shapers Community of the World Economic Forum and a Fellow of the Women Changemakers in Education initiative.

In 2023, the National Academy of Students’ Achievement Awards Ghana named her the National Youth Icon and the ambassador for the 2023-2024 academic year.
