= Wacca =

Wacca may refer to:

- Wacca, Ethiopia, a town in central Ethiopia
- Wacca Airport (IATA airport code: WAC; ICAO airport code: HAWC), Wacca, Ethiopia
- Wacca (video game) (stylized WACCA; Japanese: ワッカ), a 2019 Japanese rhythm arcade game
- Wacca Kazombiaze (born 1979), a Namibian rugby player
- Wacces or Wacca (6th century), an Ostrogoth commander
- Jimmy Walker (footballer, born 1973), a British soccer player nicknamed "Wacca"
- Wacca's, a 2024 marketing campaign rename of McDonald's in the Philippines; see List of McDonald's marketing campaigns

== See also ==
- Wacca Pilatka, Florida, USA
- WACA (disambiguation)
- Wacka (disambiguation)
- Waka (disambiguation)
- Wakka (disambiguation)
- Waka Waka (disambiguation)
