= Kusah (singer) =

- Born: Salmin Ismail Hoza; Bumbuli, Tanga Region
- Genres: Bongo Flava • R&B
- Occupation: Singer • songwriter
- Instruments: Vocals
- Years active: 2018–present
- Partner: Aunt Ezekiel

Salmin Ismail Hoza, professionally known by his stage name Kusah, is a Tanzanian musician, singer and songwriter. He started getting attention as a songwriter but later rose to stardom after releasing songs such as Kelele, No Time, I Don't Care and I Wish which made him a household name in Tanzania.

== Early life ==
Salmin Ismail was born in Bumbuli, Lushoto Tanga. As a child, Kusah became interested in music and entertainment where he used to sing in gatherings and even penned their school's anthem. After finishing high school Kusah landed in Dar es Salaam where he resided at his grandfather's house but later moved out of his grandfather's house to focus on his music career.

As a singer, Kusah is usually described as a Bongo Flava artist, who also sometimes explores other genres like Afrobeats and Afro-Pop.

In 2022, Kusah was featured by the legendary and one of the founders of the Bongo Fleva genre Dully Sykes, in a song titled Do Do

== Career ==
Before his big break in the Tanzanian music industry, Kusah was a ghostwriter as he used to write songs for major A-List artists in Tanzania such as Ali Kiba, Nandy, Ben Pol, Ruby, Hamisa Mobeto and many others.

Kusah became a household name after releasing Kelele featuring Ruby in 2018 and from there he released many successful singles such as I Don't Care, Nibebe, Mama Lao and I Wish which have amassed over 10 million streams on Boomplay.

In September 2022, Kusah released his first project titled, Romantic EP featuring Nigeria's Johnny Drille and Kenya's Femi One. The project was critically acclaimed with Notjustok describing the EP as "Kusah's way of proving that he is the next Bongo Fleva Biggest Music Export."

In 2022 he was nominated in The Tanzanian Music Awards as The Best Upcoming Artist and in the same year, he was ranked by various publications as one of the best upcoming artists in Tanzania 2022.

== Personal life ==
Kusah is dating Tanzanian Bongo Movie Actress Known, as Aunty Ezekiel and the two are blessed with 2 kids. Their relationship is public and is usually a hot topic in the Tanzanian media.

== Discography ==
- I Wish
- Blessings
- Nimepatikana
- Rafiki
- Wenyewe
- Mungu tu
- Napendwa
- I Don't Care
- Karibu
- Kelele
- Utaniua
- Te Amo
- Tamu
- On Fire
- No Time
- Huba
