= Wacka =

Wacka may refer to:

== People and characters ==
- Walter Scott (Australian footballer) (1899–1989), an Australian Australian-rules-football player nicknamed "Wacka"
- Jimmy Walker (footballer, born 1973), a British soccer player nicknamed "Wacka"
- John Williams (Australian senator) (born 1955), an Australian politician nicknamed "Wacka"

=== Fictional characters ===
- Wacka Dawson, a fictional character from the 1958 stageplay The One Day of the Year

== Other uses ==
- Wacka or Gugelhupf, an Austrian cake
- Cobra maneuver also called wacka manoeuver, an aerobatics manœuver

== See also ==
- Wacka-Wacka Brothers, fictional characters from Poppets Town
- Wah-wah (music) or wacka-wacka
  - Wah-wah pedal or wacka-wacka pedal
- WACA (disambiguation)
- Wacca (disambiguation)
- Waka (disambiguation)
- Wakka (disambiguation)
- Waka Waka (disambiguation)
