= Oumou Hawa Diallo =

Guinean climate activist

- Born: Guinea
- Education: Higher Institute of Population Sciences (ISSP) of the Joseph Ki-Zerbo University in Ouagadougou.
- Occupations: Climate and environmental advocate
- Employer: June 2023, Diallo was appointed UNICEF
- Notable work: co-founded ACOREC, an organization focused on tree planting, forest protection, and environmental education for youth.

Oumou Hawa Diallo is a Guinean climate activist and youth advocate known for her work on environmental justice and youth engagement in climate policy. She co-founded the non-governmental organisation Agir contre le réchauffement climatique (ACOREC) to promote reforestation and environmental awareness in Guinea. In 2023, she was appointed Youth Advocate for Guinea by the United Nations Children's Fund (UNICEF), a role in which she has represented young people in climate discussions and international forums.

== History and background ==
Oumou Hawa Diallo is indigenous to Guinea. She attended the Higher Institute of Population Sciences (ISSP) of the Joseph Ki-Zerbo University in Ouagadougou. She also holds a Bachelor's degree in Language Sciences from General Lansana Conté

University of Sonfonia Conakry (2020-2023).

== Career and climate activism ==
Diallo became concerned about climate change and environmental degradation from her experiences growing up in Guinea, where droughts, extreme heat, and deforestation affected local communities.

In 2018, Diallo co-founded ACOREC, an organization focused on tree planting, forest protection, and environmental education for youth. Through ACOREC, she has worked on community outreach and encouraged sustainable practices among young people and local stakeholders.

In 2021, she began working with UNICEF's Jeunes Voix du Sahel initiative to amplify youth perspectives on climate change. In 2022, she participated in discussions at the Cop27 climate conference, the Africa-Europe Week, and other international events advocating for youth involvement in climate decision-making.

== UNICEF Youth Advocate ==
In June 2023, Diallo was appointed UNICEF Youth Advocate for Guinea in recognition of her climate and environmental advocacy. In this capacity, she has engaged with children and young people across Guinea to raise awareness about the links between climate change and child rights.

== Public engagement ==
Diallo's work encompasses environmental education, community mobilization, and public speaking on climate justice issues affecting West Africa. Her advocacy highlights the disproportionate impacts of climate change on young people and vulnerable communities.
