= Nana (song) =

Single by Diamond Platnumz featuring Flavour

from the album A Boy from Tandale
- Language: Swahili; English
- Released: 29 May 2015
- Recorded: 2015
- Genre: Bongo Flava; Afrobeats
- Length: 3:14
- Label: WCB Wasafi; UMG
- Songwriters: Naseeb Abdul Juma Issack; Chinedu Izuchukwu Okoli
- Producers: Lizer Classic; Nahreel

Diamond Platnumz singles chronology
"Nasema Nawe" (2015)	"Nana" (2015)	"Ntakukumbuka" (2015)

Flavour singles chronology
"Ololufe" (2015)	"Nana" (2015)	"Power to Win" (2015)

Music video
- "Nana" on YouTube

"Nana" is a song by Tanzanian singer Diamond Platnumz featuring Nigerian singer Flavour, released as the second single from his third studio album, A Boy from Tandale (2018). The song was produced by Lizer Classic and Nahreel and is known for its fusion of Bongo Flava, Afro-pop, and Caribbean musical elements. The music video for "Nana" achieved considerable success, surpassing 100 million views on YouTube, becoming one of the first East African songs to reach this milestone. The song also garnered critical acclaim, winning accolades such as the Hipipo Music Awards for East Africa Superhit and East Africa Best Video in 2016.

== Song structure ==
"Nana" is a Bongo Flava song carrying influences from Afrobeats, typical of Diamond Platnumz's blended musical style. The song incorporates synthesized percussion and melodic elements common in Afrobeats. Operating in a 4/4 time signature, "Nana" creates a mid-tempo groove suitable for both dancing and romantic appreciation, aligning with the song's lyrical themes. Lyrically, it explores themes of romantic admiration, with Diamond Platnumz and Flavour delivering verses in Swahili and English respectively, creating a multilingual and cross-cultural appeal.

== Music video ==
The music video for "Nana" was shot in South Africa and directed by Godfather Productions. It portrays a simple storyline of a young man trying to win the heart of a schoolgirl. The video is set in "somewhere in Africa," featuring a well-groomed lawn and a large school, with classroom scenes that resemble an American setting. The visuals are heavily influenced by American hip-hop culture, particularly in the clothing, featuring elements like large headphones, sports jackets, and jewelry. However, the video maintains a distinct Tanzanian identity through its music and dance. The video also includes cameo appearances by Tanzanian artist Vanessa Mdee, South African rapper AKA and Nigerian singers Bracket, Praiz, Sean Tizzle, and Iyanya. As of March 2025, the music video for "Nana" has surpassed 100 million views on YouTube, making it Diamond Platnumz's fifth music video to reach this milestone.

=== Reception ===
The music video for "Nana" was widely praised and rapidly gained popularity upon its release. Within 48 hours after its release on YouTube, it achieved 125,000 views, quickly exceeding 340,000 views after 72 hours, demonstrating significant early interest. Daily Nation described the song as a "danceable love-tune" and lauded the video's "jaw-dropping" choreography. The video's narrative, depicting a lover's expressions of deep affection and anxieties about potential loss through poetic Swahili lyrics with West African musical influences, resonated with audiences. The video's success also challenged preconceptions about the international appeal of Swahili music, showcasing Tanzanian music's broad potential. Further praise described the video's visuals as "crisp" and the overall production as "cool" and "clean cut," highlighting its simple yet polished presentation. The performances of the "Wasafi Dancers" in the video were also specifically commended for their skill and energy.

== Live performance ==
Diamond Platnumz and Flavour jointly performed "Nana" live at the 2015 MTV Africa Music Awards, held in Durban, South Africa on Saturday, 18 July 2015.

== Accolades ==
Year	Award ceremony	Prize	Result	Ref
2015	African Muzik Magazine Awards	Best Dance Video	Won	
2015	African Muzik Magazine Awards	Best Collaboration	Nominated	
2015	African Muzik Magazine Awards	Video of the Year	Nominated	
2016	HiPipo Awards	East Africa Super Hit	Won	
2016	HiPipo Awards	East Africa Best Video	Won	

== Credits and personnel ==
Credits adapted from the digital liner notes of A Boy from Tandale on Apple Music.

- Diamond Platnumz - vocals, songwriting
- Flavour - vocals, songwriting
- Lizer Classic — production
- Nahreel - production, mixing, mastering
