= Nandy (singer) =

Tanzanian musician

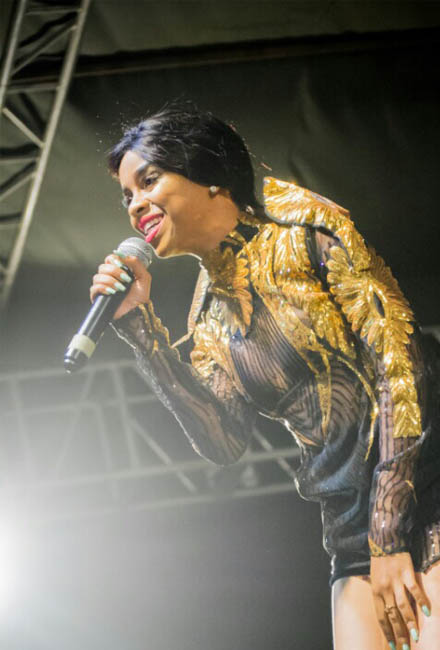
- Nandy on stage at the Fiesta Concert in Dodoma, Tanzania, 2017

Background information
- Born: Faustina Charles Mfinanga; November 9, 1992 (age 34); Mawenzi, Moshi, Tanzania
- Occupations: Singer; Songwriter; Activist; Actress
- Years active: 2013–present
- Spouse: Bill Nass
- Musical career
- Genre: Bongo flava
- Instrument: Vocals
- Label: Epic Tanzania

Faustina Charles Mfinanga (born November 9, 1992), popularly known by her stage name Nandy is a Tanzanian singer, songwriter, and actress. She was born and raised in the town of Moshi, Tanzania in Kilimanjaro Region. She won the All Africa Music Awards twice as the best female artist in East Africa in 2017 and 2020.

== Early life ==
Nandy was born to Mary Charles, a tailor and Charles Mfinanga, a mechanic. The name Nandy is shortened from her traditional name Nandera. She started performing at a very young age. At 5 years of age, she was an active member of her Sunday school choir at KKKT Lutheran church in Moshi. She attended Mawenzi Primary School and later joined Lomwe High School where she became the head of the School choir. After high school, she joined the College of Business Education (CBE), Dar es Salaam, Tanzania.

== Career ==
=== Music ===
Her music career kicked off when a mutual friend introduced her to Ruge Mutahaba, CEO of Tanzania House of Talent (THT). There, she met Emma the Boy, who produced her first mainstream single, Nagusagusa. The song became a huge hit within a week of its release.

In early 2016, she participated in a singing competition, Tecno Own the Stage, which featured contestants from across Africa. During the finals in Lagos, Nigeria, Nandy emerged as the first runner-up. The competition groomed her musically, helping her gain performance confidence and acquire essential knowledge of the music industry from musical tutors and mentors such as Chocolate City's M.I Abaga, Yemi Alade, and Bien of Sauti Sol.

In 2017, she released her hit single One Day which spearheaded her career and gave her a couple of opportunities. That year, she was one of the few artists who participated in Coke Studio Africa and was later nominated at the All Africa Music Awards as Best Female Eastern Africa, an award she won.

In January 2023, Nandy launched her own record label named "The African Princess" and signed Yammi as the label's first signee

Nandy owns a lipstick line called Shushi.

=== Acting ===
Nandy played herself in Huba, a series aired on Maisha Magic Bongo on DStv.

=== Goodwill Ambassador ===
She is currently Tanzania's Goodwill ambassador for UNICEF's water, sanitation and hygiene programme (WASH) that works in over 100 countries worldwide to improve water and sanitation services, as well as basic hygiene practices. The programme focuses on providing people with clean water and basic toilets.

== Controversies ==
In April 2018, Nandy and fellow Tanzanian singer, Bill Nass were briefly detained by the Tanzanian authorities for sharing what they considered as being indecent or obscene content online.

In 2022, a series of leaked audio clips emerged in which a female voice believed to be that of Nandy, is heard instructing Mwijaku, Tanzanian socialite and radio presenter on how to compose a message that will discredit Zuchu over a past endorsement deal that she (Zuchu) declined.

== Discography ==
=== Albums ===
- The African Princess (2018)
- Wanibariki EP (2021)
- Taste Of Love EP (2021)
- Maturity EP (2022)

=== Singles ===
- I'm Confident (2013)
- Nagusa gusa (2017)
- One Day (2017)
- Wasikudanganye (2017)
- Kivuruge (2017)
- Ninogeshe (2018)
- Aibu (2018)
- Hazipo(2019)
- Halleluya(2019)
- Kiza Kinene(2019)
- Kata (2020)
- Na Nusu
- Acha Lizame ft Harmonize
- Dozi
- Do me ft Bill Nass
- Nibakishie ft (alikiba)
- number one ft joeboy
- Leo Leo ft Koffi Olomide
- nimekuzoea
- Yuda
- kunjani ft show madjozi
- kufuli ft mariootz

== Awards and nominations ==
Year	Award Ceremony	Prize	Work/Recipient	Result
2017	All Africa Music Awards	Best Female Artist East Africa	Nandy	Won
2018	AMI Awards Afrika	Best Female Newcomer	Nandy	Won
2020	2020 African Entertainment Awards USA	Best Female Artist	Herself	Won
