= Rich Mavoko =

Tanzanian singer songwriter (born 1990)

Nam risko
- Born: Richard Martin Lusinga; October 26, 1990 (age 35); Dar es Salaam, Tanzania
- Genres: Bongo Flava, Afropop, Afrobeat
- Occupations: Musician, singer, songwriter
- Instrument: Vocals
- Years active: 2015–present
- Labels: WCB Wasafi (former); Billionea Kid (current)

Richard Martin Lusinga (born 26 October 1990), known professionally as Rich Mavoko, is a Tanzanian singer and songwriter. He was initially signed to 'King Kaka Records' in 2016, a record label founded by Kenyan rapper King Kaka, and later to WCB Wasafi. Some of his most widely known songs include 'Kokoro' featuring Diamond Platnumz, 'Rudi' featuring Patoranking, 'Show Me' featuring Harmonize, and 'Bad Boy' featuring A.Y. In 2020 he released his first E.P, 'MiniTape' as an independent artist.

== Music career ==
Rich Mavoko's departure from WCB Wasafi was mired in controversy, with many speculating as to why he ultimately decided to leave the label. When questioned, Mavoko attributed his swift departure to an alleged top down pyramid structure at the label, with one artist receiving greater investment than others; he also mentioned unfair contractual terms as one of his reasons for seeking to terminate his contract with the label and for seeking legal redress. It was not an In 2019, former WCB label mate, Harmonize, also exited the label citing similar reasons. It has since been reported that the two may soon be label mates again, if Rich Mavoko accepts Harmonize's invitation to sign to his newly formed Konde Music Worldwide.

== Personal life ==
He is known for being extremely private regarding his private life. When it was reported that he was dating fellow Tanzanian artist Lulu Diva in 2020 he was quick dispelled these rumours.

== Discography ==
=== Singles ===
Year	Title
2014	"Pacha wangu"
2015	"Lini"- King Kaka (feat. Rich Mavoko)
2016	"Ibaki Story"
2016	"Kokoro" (feat. Diamond Platnumz)
2017	"Mpe Habari" (feat. Stereo)
2017	"Sheri" (feat. Fid Q)
2017	"Rudi" (feat. Patoranking)
2018	"Ndegele"
2018	"Naogopa"
2018	"Wezele"
2019	"Babilon"

=== EPs ===
- MiniTape (2020)
1. Niwahi
2. Bad Boy (feat. A.Y.)
3. Lalama
4. Wa Moto
5. Baishoo
6. Silimisha
7. Kolo
8. Wamilele

== Awards and nominations ==
Year	Award	Category	Nominated work	Result
2013	Nzumari Award	Best artist Tanzania	Rich Mavoko	Nominated
2014	Tanzania Music Awards	Song of the Year	Mtunzi bora wa mwaka	Nominated
