= Abigail Chams =

Tanzanian multi-instrumentalist (born 2003)

- Born: Abigail Anthony Chamungwana; 7 May 2003 (age 23)
- Occupations: Singer social activist
- Known for: First female East African artist nominated for BET Award for Best New International Act

Abigail Anthony Chamungwana (born May 7, 2003), professionally known as Abigail Chams is a Tanzanian singer, songwriter, multi-instrumentalist, and youth activist. Known for her genre-defying sound that blends Bongo Flava, Afropop, R&B, and traditional Tanzanian influences, she is regarded as one of the most promising musical talents in East Africa. She is signed to Sony Music Africa and gained global recognition following her nomination at the 2025 BET Awards in the "Best New International Act" category, becoming the first solo female artist from East Africa to receive this nomination.

In addition to her music, Chams is a UNICEF Youth Advocate, an ambassador for Spotify EQUAL Africa in 2023, and founder of The Talk With Abigail Chams, initiative focused on mental health and youth empowerment.

== Music career ==
Born into a musical family – her grandfather was music director of an orchestra and her grandmother was a singer in the church choir – Abigail Chams started learning the piano when she was five years old and by the age of eight had mastered the violin, as well as the guitar, drums and flute.

She started her career by posting music covers on her social accounts. She has collaborated with top Tanzanian musical artists including Rayvanny and Harmonize (singer). She has also worked with foreign musical artists such as Jekalyn Carr.

In 2022, she was signed to Sony Music. Sixteen months after signing with Sony Music, Chams announced her first EP, titled 5. Following this announcement, she released "Milele" as the second lead single, after "Nani", featuring Marioo, which had been released a year after signing the recording deal. Enky Frank, a writer for Simulizi na Sauti (SnS), praised Abigail Chams as a valuable talent essential to the history of Bongo Flava music. He described her as a Tanzanian musician who delivers Bongo Flava at an international standard, backed by formal musical education and exceptional multi-instrumental skills..

=== Debut EP: 5 ===
Abigail Chams released her debut EP 5 on September 29, 2023, featuring six tracks that reflect key aspects of her life—faith, family, passion for music, personal journey, and excellence. The EP celebrated her East African roots and achieved commercial success, debuting at number one in Tanzania and number three in Africa. Its lead single, "Nani?", topped the Tanzanian charts within 24 hours and remained at number one for six weeks. Chams also became one of the first East African artists featured on Apple Music's The Dotty Show.

=== "Me Too": single with Harmonize ===
"Me Too", a collaboration between Abigail Chams and Harmonize, released in early 2025, received widespread acclaim from both critics and audiences. The song quickly gained commercial success, reaching the number-one position on Tanzania's Apple Music chart, marking a significant achievement for Chams as one of the leading female artists in the Bongo Flava genre. The official music video amassed millions of views on YouTube within weeks, further solidifying the track's popularity. Media outlets praised the song for its emotive lyrics and the strong vocal chemistry between the two artists, describing it as a compelling and heartfelt love anthem. Industry analysts have noted the song's potential to achieve international recognition, citing its commercial performance and artistic quality as indicators of Chams's growing influence in the global music scene.

=== Recognition by Rolling Stone Africa and musical philosophy ===
In 2025, Abigail Chams was featured by Rolling Stone Africa as one of its "Future of Music" cover artists, recognized for her distinctive position in East African pop. Described as a classically trained multi-instrumentalist fluent in Swahili, English, and French, she was noted for her musical versatility and intentional creative approach.

=== BET Awards nomination ===
In 2025, Abigail Chams made history by becoming the first female artist from East Africa to be nominated for the BET Award for Best New International Act. Her nomination at just 22 years of age not only represented a personal milestone but also marked a significant achievement for the Tanzanian and East African music industry. Her recognition on a global platform highlighted the growing influence of East African artists in the international music scene.

== Social activities ==
In 2020, Abigail Chams was named a youth advocate by UNICEF in Tanzania on mental health and gender equality during International Children's Day 2020 and she performed in expo 2020 in Dubai. She started the youth program called "The Talk With Abigail Chams", as a safe place for young people to talk on the challenges they face and discuss solutions to also fix mental health issues. She is also an ambassador for the Tanzania Chamber of Commerce, Industry and Agriculture.

== The Talk With Abigail Chams ==
The Talk With Abigail Chams is a youth mental health initiative founded in 2019 by Chams. It aims to raise awareness and reduce stigma around mental health by creating safe spaces for young people to openly discuss their challenges. The program partners with schools, universities, and mental health institutions across Tanzania to offer support through school clubs, campus programs, and psychoeducation—especially during exam periods. Featured on The Kelly Clarkson Show for its impact, it hosts an annual event that blends mental health advocacy with entertainment, panel discussions, and performances.

== Nominations and awards ==
Tanzania Music Awards

Year	Nominee / work	Award	Result
2022	Abigail Chams	Merging artist	Nominated

BET Awards

Year	Nominee / work	Award	Result
2025	Abigail Chams (Tanzania)	Best New International Act	Nominated

== Discography ==
- "Chapa Lapa"
- "Tucheze"
- "U&I"
- "Closer", featuring Harmonize
- "Nani?"
- "Milele"
- 5
- "Muhibu"
- "Me Too"
- "Hold Me"
