= Wakka =

Wakka may refer to:

- Wakka (Final Fantasy), a character from the Final Fantasy X video game
- Wakka Wakka, an Australian Aboriginal nation of south-east Queensland
- WakkaWiki, an open source wiki engine
- Uakazuwaka Kazombiaze (born 1979), also known as Wakka Kazombiaze, Namibian rugby union player

== See also ==
- Waka (disambiguation)
- Waka Waka (disambiguation)
- WACA (disambiguation)
- Wacca (disambiguation)
- Wacka (disambiguation)
