= Lava Lava (singer) =

Tanzanian singer (born 1993)

- Also known as: Lava Lava
- Born: Abdul Juma Idd; March 27, 1993 (age 33)
- Genres: Bongo flava
- Occupation: Singer
- Instrument: Vocals
- Years active: 2016–present
- Label: WCB Wasafi

Abdul Juma Idd (born March 27, 1993) better known by his stage name Lava Lava is a Tanzanian singer signed under WCB Wasafi record label. His hit songs, including Saula, Nga'ring'ari, Habibi, Tuna Kikao and Tajiri, have made a household in Tanzania. He is known for his signature Bongo Flava sound and Baibuda music style.

== Career ==
Lava Lava joined Tanzania House of Talents (THT), where he learned music. Upon completion of his music studies, a companion from WCB Wasafi requested that he present himself to Wasafi records and he was fortunate to be marked in. At Wasafi records, it took him two years before being uncovered to the fans. Lava Lava joined WCB Wasafi, a label owned by Diamond Platnumz, but was officially unveiled on May 22, 2017, releasing the song "Tuachane".

Throughout his career Lava Lava has worked with different music heavyweights including Diamond Platnumz, Harmonize, Billnass, Mbosso, Rayvanny, Lulu Diva and more.

== Personal life ==
Lava Lava's personal life is fairly private. However, he has occasionally made his relationships know to the public as Idd has introduced his fans to his girlfriend at a concert before. In 2018, he released a song titled "Single", in which he expresses annoyance at the constant rumours of his relationship status.

There have been allegations from a woman named Flaviana that she and Idd were in a relationship. Through an interview with Jubon Online, which was uploaded on YouTube on August 21, 2018, Flaviana displays a video of Idd at her house drinking tea shirtless, and WhatsApp chats between them. Flaviana had been pregnant and claimed that Lava was the father. However, in multiple interviews, Lava Lava has disregarded the claim affirming that the lady is just searching for fame.

== Discography ==
=== Albums ===
- Promise

=== Singles ===
- "Saula", featuring Harmonize (singer)
- "Warembo", featuring Susumila
- "Niue"
- "Gundu"
- "Teja"
- "Tuachane"
- "Habibi"
- "Jibebe", featuring Mbosso and Diamond Platnumz
- "Hatuachani"
- "Tukaze Roho"
- "Utatulia"
- "Utanipenda cover"
- "Go gaga"
- "Wanga"
- "Tekenya"
- "Corona"
- "Bachela"
- "Single"
- "Nimekuchagua"
- "Dede"
- "Tattoo"
- "Balaa"
- "Ya Ramadhan"
- "Kizungu zungu"
- "Dondosa"
