= Dar es Salaam pipistrelle =

Conservation status
- Data Deficient (IUCN 3.1)

Scientific classification
- Kingdom: Animalia
- Phylum: Chordata
- Class: Mammalia
- Order: Chiroptera
- Family: Vespertilionidae
- Genus: Pipistrellus
- Species: P. permixtus

Binomial name
- Pipistrellus permixtus Aellen, 1957

Species of bat

The Dar es Salaam pipistrelle (Pipistrellus permixtus) is a species of vesper bat. It is found only in Dar es Salaam Region and Pwani Region of Tanzania. Its natural habitat is subtropical or tropical dry forests.
