= Bahati Ndingo =

Tanzanian politician

Honorable Bahati Ndingo MP

Member of Parliament
- In office 2015–2023
- Constituency: Special Seats
- Incumbent
- Assumed office September 2023
- Preceded by: Francis Mtega
- Constituency: Mbarali Constituency

Personal details
- Born: Bahati Keneth Ndingo; August 7, 1985 (age 40) Mbeya Region, Tanzania
- Party: Party of the Revolution
- Education: Samaritani Girls Secondary School; Mwakaleli High School
- Alma mater: Institute of Finance Management; Open University of Tanzania

Bahati Keneth Ndingo (born August 7, 1985), is a Tanzanian politician presently serves as a Chama Cha Mapinduzi's Member of Parliament for Mbarali Constituency since September 2023. She was national assembly member woman representative under special seats from 2015 to 2023.
