= Remidus E. Kissassi =

Tanzanian politician

Remidus E. Kissassi is a Tanzanian politician and one of five Tanzanian members of the African Union's Pan-African Parliament.
