= Rashid Abdalla Rashid =

Tanzanian politician

Honorable Rashid Abdalla Rashid MP

Member of Parliament
- Incumbent
- Assumed office 2015
- Constituency: Kiwani Constituency

Personal details
- Born: Rashid Abdalla Rashid; October 24, 1973 (age 52) Mkoani, Zanzibar, Tanzania
- Party: Party of the Revolution
- Education: Kiwani Primary School; Kangani Centre; Zanzibar Institute of Financial Administration; Open University of Tanzania

Rashid Abdalla Rashid (born October 24, 1973), is a Tanzanian politician presently serves as a Chama Cha Mapinduzi's Member of Parliament for Kiwani Constituency in Mkoani Region in Zanzibar since November 2015.
