= Shetta =

- Also known as: Baba Qayllah
- Born: Nurdin Bilali Ally; July 16, 1990 (age 36); Dar es Salaam, Tanzania
- Origin: Ilala
- Genre: Bongo flava hip-hop
- Occupation: Singer rapper
- Instrument: Vocal
- Years active: 2009–present

Nurdin Bilal Ali (born July 16, 1990), better known by his stage name SHETTA, is Tanzanian politician who serve as mayor of Dar es Salaam and former musician in Tanzania, with a number of his songs having reached peak positions on various music charts in the country and across the African continent. His single "Namjua" dominated several charts at peak position for several weeks in a row in 2016. The song's video had one million views on YouTube as of 2016.

== Early life ==
Shetta was born at Amana Hospital, Ilala Municipality in the city of Dar es Salaam. He grew up at Ilala Mchikichini Boma and attended his primary education at Boma Primary School before joining Benjamin Mkapa Secondary School in 2008.

== Music career ==
Shetta discovered his music talents in 2009, when he was a dancer in a local group called Misifa Camp, under a popular singer and producer, Dully Sykes, for whom Shetta later became a backup singer. Eventually, Shetta managed to form his own musical group, Dar Stamina.

He released his debut single, "Mi Naplay", featuring one of Tanzania's hip-hop legends, MwanaFA. The fact that MwanaFA, who is an early name in the East African country's hip-hop scene, agreed to work with such a new artist, indicated that Shetta had star qualities, and was going to have a brilliant music career in the future. Like elsewhere in the world, established artists in Tanzania would only agree to collaborate with new artists who show great potential.

In 2010, Shetta officially released another single that introduced him well to the Tanzanian music scene, named "Nimechokwa", featuring leading local R&B star Belle9. The hit song earned him credibility and provided him with several opportunities to perform across Tanzania.

A year later, Shetta released another hit song, "Mdandanda", featuring two household names in Tanzania's bongo flava scene, Dully Sykes and Tundaman.

In 2012, he released another hit, "Nidanganye", featuring one of the biggest names in African music, Tanzania's own Diamond Platnumz.

In the same year, he released another single "Bonge la Bwana", featuring a top local female artist, Linah, followed by another hit song, "Sina Imani", featuring Rich Mavoko.

After a short hiatus, Shetta came up with another song in 2014, "Kerewa", featuring Diamond Platnumz, again. This single was such a huge success that it made its way to the MTV Africa Top 10, the continent's definitive top ten countdown. The chart is usually frequented by top artists from South Africa and Nigeria, and for an artist like Shetta who had been on the scene for barely five years, it meant Tanzania had now a new force to be reckoned with.

A year later, his successes caught the attention of music industry executives beyond Tanzanian borders, and he was signed to one of the leading record labels in the continent, Spice Africa. There, he had the opportunity to record a song with an international Nigerian music star, Kcee. The hit song, "Shikorobo", became an instant banger which officially introduced Shetta into the mainstream.

The singer also has a non profit organization called Sawa which is an initiative that deals with ending violence against women and children

== Discography ==
Title	Year
"Mi Naplay" ft. MwanaFA	2009
"Mi Naplay Remix" ft. MwanaFA, Godzilla & Mabeste	2009
"Nimechokwa" ft. Belle9	2010
"Mdananda" ft. Dully Sykes and Tundaman	2011
"Nidanganye" ft. Diamond Platnumz	2012
"Bonge la Bwana" ft. Linah	2012
"Sina Imani" ft. Rich Mavoko	2012
"Kerewa" ft. Diamond Platnumz	2014
"Shikorobo" ft. Kcee	2015
"Namjua"	2016
"Wale Wale"	2017
"Vumba" ft. G Nako	2017
"Hatufanani" ft. Jux, Mr Blue	2018
"Sikupigi tena" ft. Emtee, JayMoe	2019
"Uswahilini" &. Mzee wa Bwax	2019
"Bonge La Toto	2019
