= Sandra A. Mushi =

Tanzanian writer

Sandra Mushi
- Sandra Mushi with one of her paintings
- Born: Aikaruwa Mushi; 1974 (age 51–52); Dar es Salaam, Tanzania
- Education: Cape Peninsula University of Technology
- Occupation: Writer
- Writing career
- Genres: Poetry, novel

Sandra Aikaruwa Mushi (born 1974) is a Tanzanian writer, primarily of poetry and short stories.

== Biography ==
Mushi was born in Dar es Salaam Region, Tanzania, in 1974. She spent her childhood between the United Kingdom, Tanzania, and Botswana.

She studied interior design in South Africa at Cape Technikon, then began a career as an interior designer.

While continuing to work in design, Mushi began a career as a writer. She has published stories and poetry in various magazines and journals, including in JENdA: A Journal of Culture and African Women Studies and through the Africa Knowledge Project and the literary organization SOMA. She has also written columns on interior design for The Citizen and other Tanzanian publications. Her work was included in the anthology Reflections: An Anthology of New Work by African Women Poets in 2013.

Her first book, the poetry collection The Rhythmn of My Rhyme, was published by Andika Afrika in 2008. It is not clear whether the misspelling of "Rhythm" is intentional.

Her second book, Stains on My Khanga, is a collection of short stories and poems and was published in 2014.

Mushi has been categorized as an important contributor to contemporary Tanzanian literature, particularly among women writers.

Her writing has sometimes been characterized as satire, focusing on the daily lives of women. She previously described herself as "neither a feminist nor an activist," but later quoted Chimamanda Ngozi Adichie to assert, "We should all be feminists." She primarily writes in English, with some Swahili in her later work. Her later work is also more serious in tone, frequently dealing with domestic violence and other struggles women face.
