= Bill Nass =

Tanzanian rapper of Chagga origin from Tanga Region

- Born: William Nicholaus Lyimo; 11 April 1993 (age 33); Tanga Region, Tanzania
- Genre: Bongo flava • Tanzanian hip hop • Rap
- Occupations: Rapper, songwriter, singer
- Instrument: Vocal
- Years active: 2014 – present
- Label: LFLG
- Spouse: Nandy (singer)

William Nicholaus Lyimo (born 11 April 1993), popularly known by his stage name Bill Nass, is a Tanzanian rapper of Chagga heritage. He was born in the Tanga Region. MTV Base named him among the "50 Artists To Watch For In 2017". He is currently based in Dar es Salaam. Months after the release of his debut single "Raha", Lyimo was nominated as the "New Best Artist" at the 2015's Kilimanjaro Tanzania Music Awards (KTMA). He won the 2022 Tanzania Music Award for Best Male Hip Hop Artist.

Over the following ten years, he released multiple songs, collaborated with other artists, and received various awards. In 2021, he founded his own record label, Mafioso Inc. His single Puuh, featuring Jay Melody, reached number one on Boomplay charts for six weeks and accumulated over 51 million streams. Billnass has remained a notable figure in the Tanzanian music industry and continues to maintain a significant following on digital platforms.

In 2026, Bill Nass surpassed 100 million streams on Boomplay. The achievement earned him recognition as a member of Boomplay's Golden Club and marked a significant streaming milestone in his career.

== Early life and education ==
William Nicholaus Lyimo was born on 11 April 1993, at Bombo Hospital in Tanga Tanzania to Chagga parents from Kilimanjaro Region.

Bill Nass started his primary education at Mbuyuni Primary School in Tanga from 2000 to 2003 then moved to Mkunguni Primary School in Kinondoni Dar es Salaam. He later joined Oysterbay Secondary School from 2007 to 2010 where he completed his secondary studies. From 2011 to 2013, he studied for a Diploma in Procurement and Supplies Management at the College Of Business Education at Dar es Salaam Campus. In 2014, he rejoined the college until 2017 where he graduated with a Bachelor's degree in Procurement and Supplies Management.

== Career ==
MTV Base named him as one of the "Best 50 Artists to Watch For In 2017". Later In 2017, Bill Nass made his debut on Coke Studio Africa as a Big Breakthrough Artist, where he performed alongside Uganda's Sheeba and Ethiopia's Asgegenew.

Lyimo has performed several times on Fiesta, a concert that has been managed by Clouds Fm Radio for years. Also in 2019, he performed on Wasafi Festival's stage.

Through his Instagram page, Bill Nass shared the advent of "Love Tour" with his fiancée Nandy with whom he has collaborated in various songs like "Bugana" and "Do Me".

As of September 2025, Bill Nass has an approximately 8 million followers on his digital platforms.

Awards

He won the Best Hip Hop Artist in 2022 at the Tanzania Music Awards.

In April 2025, Bill Nass was named Best Male Rapper East Africa at the East Africa Arts Entertainment Awards (EAEA), recognizing his contributions to the East African hip-hop scene. Competing with prominent rappers from Kenya, Uganda, and Rwanda, he won the award for his artistry, innovation, and influence. The accolade highlighted both his individual achievements and the growing prominence of Tanzanian rap within the regional music industry.

=== Chuo Kwa Chuo By Nenga ===
Chuo Kwa Chuo is a youth-focused initiative launched by Bill Nass in 2024. It involved touring universities and colleges across Tanzania with a mix of live performances, talent competitions, and educational discussions on issues like mental health and entrepreneurship. The project aimed to empower students, promote local talent, and merge music with learning. While it was widely praised, one incident at TIA Dar es Salaam sparked online debate, leading Bill Nass to issue a public apology. Overall, Chuo Kwa Chuo has been recognized as a creative platform connecting music, culture, and youth empowerment.

== Personal life ==
In 2018, Lyimo and his wife Nandy, were shortly detained by the Tanzanian authorities for sharing what was considered as indecent online content.

Lyimo proposed to Nandy early in 2020 on a live TV show.

They officially tied the knot in 2022 in a wedding attended by close friends and family. Since then, they have been open about their relationship and their desire to build a strong, loving family. In 2024, there were rumours about the couple expecting a second child. As of 2025, they are publicly known to have one child.

== Discography ==
Year	Song	Collaborated Artist
2025	Boda	Mbosso
	How Come	Sir Holly, Jaivah
2024	Number One	Mbosso
	Cancer Freestyle	
	Maboss	Jux
	Kinamba Namba	G Nako, Whozu, Apuki & DJ Joozey
	Magetoni	
2023	Maokoto	Marioo
2022	Puuh	Jay Melody
	Utaonaje	Rayvanny
	Bye	Nandy
	Chetu	
2021	Tit For Tat	Rilvin
	Tatizo	
2020	Huna Baya	Meja Kunta
	Do Me	Nandy
	Tumeokoka	Shetta, Gnako
	Deka	Marioo
2019	Bugana	Nandy
	Funga Geti	Roma
	Mafioso	
	Naleft	
2018	Tagi Ubavu	
	Kwa Leo	Whozu
	Labda	
2017	Sina Jambo	
	Mazoea	Mwana FA
2016	Chafu Pozi	
2015	Ligi Ndogo	TID
2014	Demu Gani	Barnaba
	Raha	Naazizi
