= Tatu Mussa Ntimizi =

Former MP in the Tanzanian National Assembly (born 1946)

Member of the National Assembly of Tanzania
- In office 1990–2010
- Succeeded by: Athuman Mfutakamba
- Constituency: Igalula

Personal details
- Born: 9 April 1946 (age 80)
- Party: Chama Cha Mapinduzi

Tatu Mussa Ntimizi is a former Member of Parliament in the Tanzanian National Assembly who represented the constituency of Igalula in the Uyui District of the Tabora Region. She is a member of the Chama Cha Mapinduzi revolutionary party.

== Biography ==
From 1990 to 1995, Ntimizi served as a special-seat MP in the National Assembly. A total of 113 of these special seats are available in the assembly, and are reserved for female representatives to ensure a certain percentage of the assembly consists of women. After her term ended, however, Ntimizi ran for and won a constituency seat in the 1995 general election. In the 2000 and 2005 elections, she successfully won reelection for a second and third time. At that time, she was one of 17 women holding constituency seats, and one of 9 women who had previously been special-seat members.

Election Results
Year	Votes	Percent
1990		
1995		
2000	7339	55.3
2005	15106	60.0

Ntimizi served as the Deputy Minister of Lands and Human Settlements Development under Minister Gideon Cheyo. She was in the cabinet of former Tanzanian president Benjamin Mkapa. In 1999, President Mkapa shifted many of his ministers to new positions, and Ntimizi assumed the position of Deputy Minister of Health. In that position Ntimizi reported to have officially announced the cessation of Tanzania importing the anti-malaria drug chloroquine as a result of growing resistance to the drug in malaria-causing parasites.

In the 2010 general election, Ntimizi chose not to run for office again in order to allow younger members of her party the opportunity to run for her seat. Athuman Rajab Mfutakamba, another member of the Chama Cha Mapinduzi, ran for and won her seat in the 2010 general elections.
