= Thobias Andengenye =

Tanzanian politician

Fire Commissioner General of Tanzania
- In office 2016–2020
- President: John Magufuli

Personal details
- Born: c. 1964 (age 61–62) mbeya
- Education: UDSM (BA); Kurasini Police College; International Academy Bramshill
- Occupation: Police officer, Civil servant
- Police career
- Allegiance: Tanzania
- Branch: Tanzania National Police
- Status: Retired
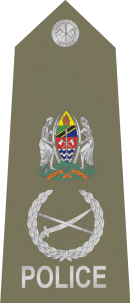
- Rank: Commissioner

Thobias Andengenye is the regional commissioner for Kigoma Region in Tanzania. From 2016 to January 2020 he was Commissioner general of the Tanzania fire and rescue force.

Former president Magufuli dismissed Andengenye alongside minister Kangi Lugola in January 2020 due to alleged procurement irregularities. In July 2020 he was appointed Kigoma regional commissioner.
