= Waka (Diamond Platnumz song) =

2023 single by WizooBlack featuring Queen Dada

Single by Diamond Platnumz featuring Rick Ross
- Released: 1 December 2017
- Recorded: 2017
- Genre: Afropop
- Length: 3:16
- Label: WCB Wasafi; Maybach
- Songwriters: Naseeb Juma; William Roberts II
- Producer: Lizer

Diamond Platnumz singles chronology
"Chipolopolo" (2017)	"Waka" (2017)	"Sikomi" (2018)

Music video
- "Waka" on YouTube

"Waka", is a song by Tanzanian bongo flava recording artist and dancer Diamond Platnumz, featuring American rapper Rick Ross. The song was made available for streaming and digital download on iTunes and various online music platforms on 1 December 2017. "Waka" is an Afropop song produced by Lizer.

== Background and release ==
Waka was written by Diamond Platnumz and produced by Laizer under the label WCB Wasafi (Wasafi Classic Baby).

== Music video ==
The music video for "Waka" was released on Dec 7, 2017 through Diamond Platnumz's official YouTube account. The video was shot and directed by Nigerian Director, Moe Musa in Miami, Florida (United States of America).

== Release history ==
=== Video release history ===
Country	Date	Format	Label
Tanzania	December 7, 2017	Digital download	WCB Wasafi (Wasafi Classic Baby)

=== Audio release ===
Country	Date	Format	Label
Tanzania	December 1, 2017	Digital download	WCB Wasafi (Wasafi Classic Baby)

== Crew ==
Song credits

- Writing - Diamond Platnumz
- Production - Wasafi Classic Baby

Video credits

- Director - Moe Musa
