= Tanzania Chamber of Commerce, Industry and Agriculture =

The Tanzania Chamber (TCCIA) is a Tanzanian government institution with a mandate to promote industry and business, and to facilitate an interface between the private sector and public sector in the country. TCCIA was founded in 1988 and its head offices are in Dar es Salaam. It has played in important role in the privatization and liberalization of Tanzania's economy.

== Operations ==
TCCIA has opened 21 regional chambers of commerce and 92 district centers in Tanzania, in association with the Swedish International Development Cooperation Agency, an agency of the Swedish government.

All twenty-one Regional Chambers act as non-profit organizations charging nominal membership dues.

TCCIA currently has more than 8,000 members and it established a wide network of organizations and associations, including an affiliation with the Federation of Women Entrepreneurs of Tanzania. This is a positive development as the two organizations have complementing objectives. TCCIA takes the advantage of the network to achieve results with the device "alone you are weak, together we are strong".

Services provided by TCCIA to the business community include business information, training, advocacy, business support initiatives (i.e. processing business licenses) and business promotion activities, for instance, marketing programs, trade fairs and missions.

TCCIA has for example expertise in many areas of interest to local businesses for their development. It can then offer these skills and information in the form of Seminars, Workshops and Training in a number of fields. All these are related to the business activities of the member companies. Therefore, the demands of the companies direct the work of the Chamber. Trade promotion is encouraged through participation and representation in national and international Trade Fairs and international delegations. This in the long run will give member companies the possibility to increase trade opportunities.

The Chamber of Commerce receives a great number of business inquiries from all over the world. They concern companies trying to find customers or suppliers and are published in newsletters, which are distributed to all full-paid member companies.

TCCIA organizes a number of activities for its members and also for those who are not members. During the year several seminars/workshops and courses are taking place. It can be on different subjects but also for different target groups.

Advocacy and lobbying is taking place on various levels. The businessperson is welcome to the chamber to get advice and contacts on the spot or it is possible to forward questions via email. Lobbying is taking place on the topic of burning issues for businesspersons. Although, the business community is always welcome to give TCCIA the possibility to intensify or bring new issues on the agenda.

Business promotional activities like business delegations have become critical to international trade. Every year, Tanzania Chamber of Commerce, Industry and Agriculture organizes business delegations to several nations, either as the sole host or the coordinator. For these events, the Tanzania Chamber of Commerce, Industry and Agriculture welcomes and hosts corporate delegations from various nations, and collaborating with other organizations and institutions.

== Organization ==
Chamber of commerce economic sector committees include:

- Agriculture & Environment
- Communication, Commerce & Trade
- Finance & Resource Mobilization
- Government Affairs, TNBC & TPSF
- Industry, Mining & Energy
- Women & Youth Development

== See also ==
- Chamber of commerce
- Economy of Tanzania
- Industry trade group
