= Mateo Qares =

Tanzanian politician

Mateo Qares is a former Tanzanian CCM politician, cabinet minister and member of Parliament for Babati constituency, which was then part of Arusha region. He held different appointed positions during Presidents Ali Hassan Mwinyi's and Benjamin Mkapa's presidential terms from years 1985 to 2005. He was a minister of co-operatives and marketing, minister of state for the president's office, as well as Mbeya regional commissioner.
