= Sajjad Fazel =

Dr. Sajjad Fazel
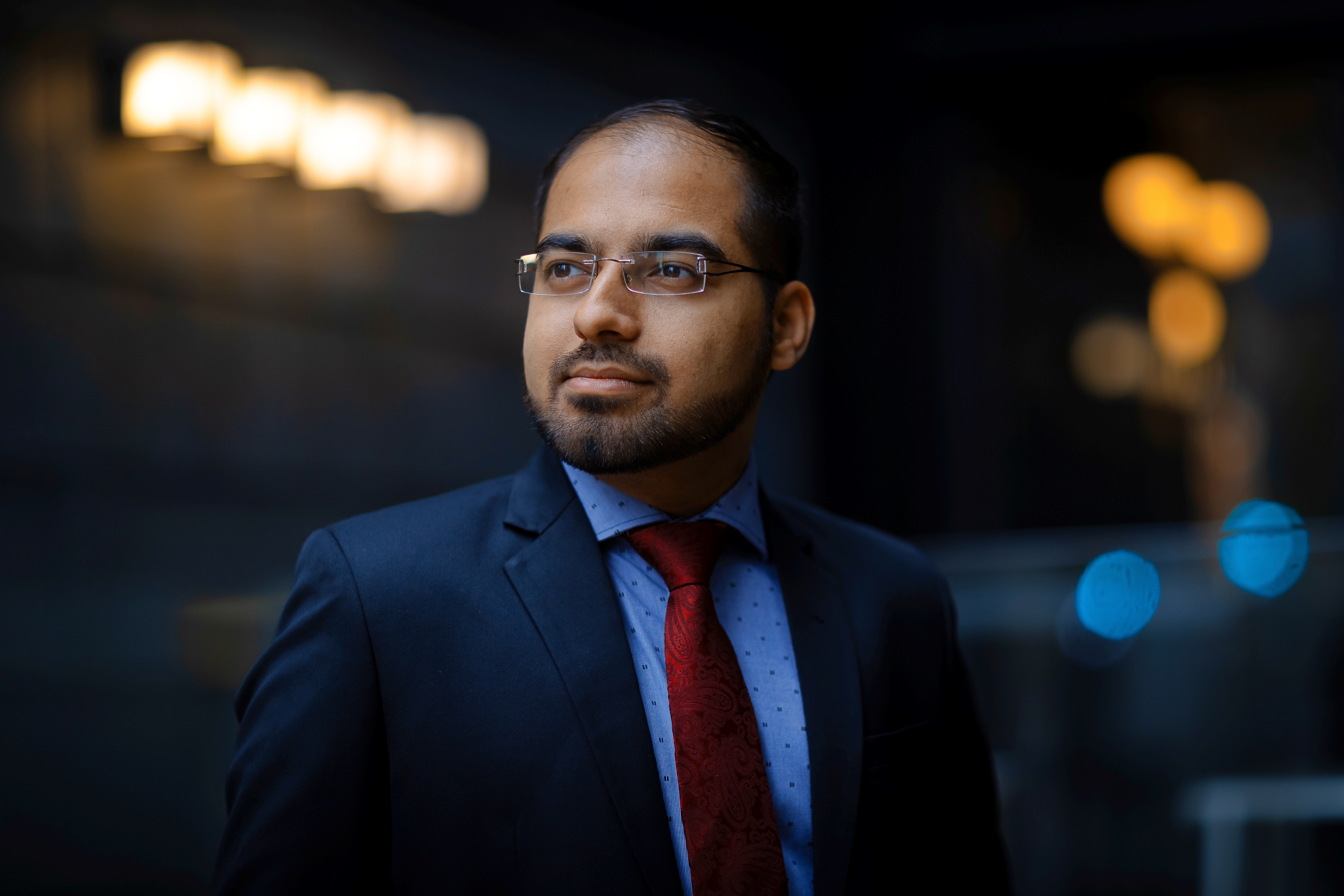
- Fazel at the University of Calgary
- Born: 14 May 1991 (age 35)
- Education: Manipal Academy of Higher Education (Pharm.D.); University of Western Ontario (M.P.H.)
- Occupation: Public health researcher
- Website: sajjadfazel.ca

Sajjad Sherally Fazel (born May 14, 1991) is a Canadian clinical pharmacist, public health researcher, and the founder of Afya Yako, Tanzania's first online health promotion initiative. Afya Yako impacted thousands of Tanzanians and inspired an online health movement in Tanzania.

== Early life and education ==
Sajjad was born and raised in Dar es Salaam, Tanzania. He graduated from Haven of Peace Academy in 2009. He received a Doctor of Pharmacy from Manipal Academy of Higher Education in early 2015. During his time at Manipal, he was the lead for VSO - Manipal, a university voluntary organization. In 2018, he received a Master of Public Health from the University of Western Ontario. Sajjad received an Institute Community Support Travel Award from the Canadian Institutes of Health Research for presenting a poster on Afya Yako at the Canadian Public Health Association Conference in 2018. He is also a member of the World Economic Forum's Global Shapers community. He currently resides in Calgary.

== Career ==
=== Research ===
In May 2018, Sajjad joined the Canadian Cancer Society as a policy researcher working on the smoke-free campuses initiative. This initiative advocated for post-secondary institutions to adopt a 100% smoke-free campus and produced a report of smoke-free campuses in Canada, as a result, several university and colleges adopted the policy and the initiative received wide media attention.

In January 2019, Sajjad joined Alberta Health Services and the University of Calgary as a public health researcher studying the safe handling of antineoplastic drugs. He is currently researching and addressing the spread of COVID-19 misinformation for which he has appeared on several news outlets. Sajjad has published numerous articles in academic journals and popular media on topics related to cancer prevention, tobacco control, and COVID-19 misinformation.

=== Columnist ===
Sajjad began his career in journalism in early 2014, by writing for a local magazine called, What's happening in Dar. In early 2015, he caught the eye of Nipashe editor, who hired Sajjad as a health columnist for the Swahili language Tanzanian newspaper. Sajjad remained with Nipashe for 6 months, covering local health issues.

In July 2015, Sajjad left Nipashe and was immediately recruited by The Citizen editor as a health columnist for a new health page published every Monday. At The Citizen, Sajjad discussed about various health topics and advocated for change in the health sector by raising various concerns that provoked thought and action.

In July 2016, Sajjad advocated against the widespread use of Hookah in Tanzania through various articles and radio talks that led the President of Tanzania, John Magufuli to ban the use of Hookah nationwide.

Sajjad continued his advocacy by bringing to light the Aflatoxin epidemic in Tanzania and proposing a solution for it. Questions were raised towards the Ministry of Health and Social Welfare by the public and funding for the proposed solution began which completed on December 19, 2017.

Throughout 2016, Sajjad continued to advocate about the rise of Non-communicable diseases in Tanzania, discussing various topics including healthy eating and the importance of exercise. This caused the Ministry of Health and Social Welfare to institute a national day of exercise in December 2016.

=== Social media ===
In June 2016, Sajjad founded Afya Yako Online, a Swahili-based health education and awareness health initiative that educated and empowered thousands of Tanzanians on Twitter, Facebook and Instagram. This initiative was sponsored by Kwanza TV. In 2017, the Afya Yako Online initiative had received great acclaim from notable persons, politicians and media alike.

== Other media appearances ==
Sajjad has appeared in numerous Television and Radio shows as himself advocating for healthy policies and educating the public. He also appeared on BBC Swahili Radio in October 2016. Sajjad continues to provide commentary on various health issues for Tanzanian Newspapers. He has also appeared several times as a guest speaker on Canadian television and radio shows.

== Selected works and publications ==
=== Selected articles ===
- Fazel, Sajjad (6 January 2021). "We must address anti-science sentiments before it is too late". Toronto Star. Archived from the original on 2021-01-07.
- Fazel, Sajjad (11 October 2020). "Interacting safely during a pandemic: Tips from a public health researcher". Toronto Star. Archived from the original on 2020-10-12.
- Fazel, Sajjad (16 July 2020). "Flying safely during COVID-19: Tips from a public health researcher". National Post.
- Fazel, Sajjad (17 July 2017). "Maternal healthcare given the top priority". The Citizen.

=== Selected journals ===
- Fazel, Sajjad; Quinn, Emma; Ford-Sahibzada, Chelsea; Szarka, Steven; Peters, Cheryl (July 2021). "Sunscreen Posts on Twitter in the United States and Canada, 2019: Content Analysis". JMIR Dermatology. 4 (2) e29723. JMIR Publications. doi:10.2196/29723. PMC 10501514. PMID 37632814.
- Fazel, Sajjad; Nawaz, Faisal; Ritschl, Valentin (April 2021). "People's Willingness to Vaccinate Against COVID-19 Despite Their Safety Concerns: Twitter Poll Analysis". Journal of Medical Internet Research. 23 (4) e28973. JMIR Publications. doi:10.2196/28973. PMC 8086789. PMID 33872185.
- Fazel, Sajjad; Quinn, Emma; Peters, Cheryl (December 2020). "The Instagram Infodemic: Cobranding of Conspiracy Theories, Coronavirus Disease 2019 and Authority-Questioning Beliefs". Cyberpsychology, Behavior, and Social Networking. 24 (8). Mary Ann Liebert, Inc.: 573–577. doi:10.1089/cyber.2020.0663. PMID 33395548.
- Fazel, Sajjad; Dilliott, Daniel; Ehsan, Nazia; Sibbald, Shannon (August 2020). "The attitudes and behaviors of students, staff and faculty towards smoke-free and tobacco-free campus policies in North American universities: A narrative review". Tobacco Prevention & Cessation. 6 (47). European Network for Smoking and Tobacco Prevention: 47. doi:10.18332/tpc/125080. PMC 7493649. PMID 32954060.
- Quinn, Emma K.; Heer, Emily V.; Fazel, Sajjad S.; Peters, Cheryl E. (November 2022). "The Instagram Infodemic Persists: Extreme Content Escapes Platform's Removal Tactics". Cyberpsychology, Behavior, and Social Networking. 25 (11). Mary Ann Liebert, Inc.: 752–755. doi:10.1089/cyber.2021.0335.
- Fazel, Sajjad S.; Keefe, Anya; Shareef, Arshiya; Palmer, Alison L.; Brenner, Darren R.; Nakashima, Lynne; Koehoorn, Mieke W.; McLeod, Chris B.; Hall, Amy L.; Peters, Cheryl E. (December 2022). "Barriers and facilitators for the safe handling of antineoplastic drugs". Journal of Oncology Pharmacy Practice. 28 (8). SAGE Publications: 1709–1721. doi:10.1177/10781552211040176.
- Duffy, Robert T.; Brobbey, Anita; Rydz, Ela; Quinn, Emma K.; Fazel, Sajjad S.; Peters, Cheryl E. (2025). "Young workers' perceptions about occupational carcinogens". New Solutions: A Journal of Environmental and Occupational Health Policy. SAGE Publications. doi:10.1177/10519815251382372.
- Quinn, Emma K.; Rydz, Ela; Brobbey, Anita; Duffy, Robert T.; Fazel, Sajjad S.; Peters, Cheryl E. (2026). "Understanding young adults' sun safety practices in the workplace". New Solutions: A Journal of Environmental and Occupational Health Policy. SAGE Publications. doi:10.1177/10519815261434382.
