= Dully Sykes =

Tanzanian musician (born 1980)

- Dully Sykes

Background information
- Also known as: Mr. Misifa
- Born: Abdul Sykes; 4 December 1980 (age 45); Dar es Salaam, Tanzania
- Origin: Dar Es Salaam, Tanzania
- Genres: Bongo Flava; Afropop
- Occupations: Singer; record producer
- Instrument: Vocals
- Years active: 1999–present
- Labels: Dhahabu Records; 41 Records

Dully Sykes (born Abdul Sykes on 4 December 1980) is a Tanzanian Bongo Flava musician, songwriter, record producer and composer.

== Biography ==
Also known as Mr Misifa or Mr Chicks, Dully Sykes is a bongo flava artist from Tanzania, the grandson of Abdulwahid Sykes. He has performed in the UK and he is one of the pioneers of Swahili dancehall in the African Great Lakes region, and is widely known for hits like "Julieta", "Salome", "Historia ya Kweli" and "Leah". Some of his songs are based on true stories. After the first album, Historia ya kweli released in 2003, people started calling his music mwanasesele, Swahili for a high squeaky noise. With the song "Handsome" and an album by the same name, he became one of the biggest names in young urban music in Tanzania. He has produced music at his Dar es Salaam record label called Dhahabu Records, and continues to write songs. He has provided "hooks" to many artists including Man X's "Nimechezea Bahati" and P-Funk's "Please Forgive Me". One of his tracks, "Handsome", is on the African Rebel Music Roots reggae and dancehall CD compiled by the international record label, Out Here Records. Dully Sykes is renowned for his relevance and long stay on the game as most of his era-mate artists have already laid low. He is one of the founding fathers of Bongo flava. Dully Sykes has a high reputation of bringing to the game some of the big names in the industry including Marioo, Shetta and the late Pancho latino. In 2022, he featured Tanzanian singer, Kusah in his smash hit Do Do.

== Nyambizi and controversy ==
Sykes has also attracted criticism for his lyrical content and the images in his videos. His most controversial song is "Nyambiz", a tale of his sexual experience with a "nyambizi", slang for a large voluptuous woman. Released as a single in 2001, the song was attacked by various organisations for its lewd lyrics. In response to public outlash, radio stations refused to play the song, but it nevertheless continued to be requested by radio listeners. Sykes' music videos have also attracted criticism.

== Discography ==
- Historia ya Kweli (2003)
- Handsome (2004)
- Hunifahamu (2005)

== Compilations ==
- Bongo Hottest Flavas: Volume 1
- Ndani ya Bongo: Volume 1
- Kwa Fujo Deejayz: Volume 1
- Kwa Fujo Deejayz: Ladha Zaidi
- Kwa Fujo Deejayz: Mlipuko wa Bongo Cuts
- Gede Records: Pasua Kichwa
- Bongo Halisi (2004)
- G-Project: Bongo Project Volume 1 (2005)
- Fungua Mwaka 2005 (2005)
- Pamoja Ndani Ya Game (2006)
- African Rebel Music: "Roots, Reggae and Dancehall" (2006)

== Awards ==
=== Won ===
- 2011 Tanzania Music Awards – Best Video and Best Ragga/Dancehall Song ("Action" with CPWAA, Ms. Triniti & Mangwair)
- 2012 Tanzania Music Awards – Best Ragga/Dancehall Song ("Maneno Maneno" with Queen Darleen)

=== Nominations ===
- 2004 Tanzania Music Awards – Best Hip Hop Album (Handsome)
- 2007 Tanzania Music Awards – Best collaboration ("Dhahabu" with Joslin and Mr. Blue)
- 2008 Tanzania Music Awards – Best Reggae/Ragga Song ("Baby Candy")
- 2010 Tanzania music awards – Best Ragga/Dancehall Song ("Shikide")
- 2012 Tanzania Music Awards – Best Male Artist, Best Video ("Bongo flava"), Best Afro Pop Song ("Bongo flava")
