= Nahida Esmail =

Tanzanian author

- Born: Dar es Salaam, Tanzania
- Education: Master's in Child Development with Early Childhood Education, Institute of Education, University of London U.K; BSc in Psychology Goldsmiths College, University of London U.K
- Occupations: Author; Poet; Columnist
- Children: Hafsah Seedat Khaled, Humeira Seedat Khaled
- Writing career
- Pen name: Umm Hafsah
- Language: English; Swahili
- Notable awards: CODE's Burt Award for African Young Adult Literature

Nahida Esmail is a Tanzanian author and poet. She is a lifetime sponsor of 'The Teen Writers Awards'.

== Early life and education ==
Nahida Esmail was born and raised in Dar es Salaam, Tanzania. She was educated at Goldsmiths College, University of London, and graduated with a BSc in psychology and completed a master's degree in Child Development with Early Childhood Education at the Institute of Education, University of London.

== Career ==
Esmail has published four young adult fiction novels and ten children's books of which some have been translated into Swahili and Maa.

== Personal life ==
She married and gave birth to two daughters, Hafsah and Humeira Khaled.

== Writing ==
=== Books ===
- Esmail, Nahida (29 December 2017). Living in the Shade: Aiming for the Summit. African Books Collective. ISBN 978-9987-08-348-0.
- Esmail, Nahida (2011). Lessilie: The City Maasai. Oxford University Press. ISBN 978-9976-4-0428-9.
- Nahida, Esmai (16 April 2018). The Detectives of Shangani. Mkuki na Nyota Publishers. ISBN 978-9987-08-292-6.
- Esmail, Nahida (30 October 2017). What Is Islam?. Fitra Journal. ISBN 978-0-9988260-4-2.
- Esmail, Nahida (2019). Karafu: A Freed Slave. Mkuki na Nyota. ISBN 978-9987-08-331-2.
- Esmail, Nahida (2021). Bahiya, the Little Zebra: A Picture Book from Tanzania and Egypt. African Bureau Stories. ISBN 978-9988-2-2702-9.
- Esmail, Nahida (2024). The pink bodaboda. MBIU Press. OCLC 1463940813.

=== Poetry ===
- The Atlas Lions

== Awards and honours ==
In 2015 Esmail was honoured with the Tanzania Women's Achievement Award for the education category.

Her four young adult novels, Living in the Shade, Lesslie the City Maasai, Detectives of Shangani, and Living in the Shade: Aiming for the Summit have all received CODE's Burt Award for African literature.
