= Ruge Mutahaba =

Tanzanian bureaucrat (1970–2019)

Ruge Mutahaba (1970 – 26 February 2019) was a Tanzanian business executive. He served as Director of Strategy and Programs Development at Clouds Media Group. In 2009 he had his first child Jordan Mutahaba with Kauye Shabani A dancer at THT (Tanzania house of talent) and in 2012 his second Russell Mutahaba with Tanzanian presenter Zamaradi Mketema.

== Early life ==
Mutahaba was born in Berkeley, California in 1970. On his return from the United States to Tanzania, Mutahaba attended primary school in Arusha from standard 1 to 6 and then attended Mlimani. He attended secondary school at Forodhani in Dar es Salaam for ordinary level education (O-level) and high school in Pugu for advanced level (A – Level) education. He earned a bachelor's degree in marketing and BA in finance at San Jose State University.

== Career ==
Mutahaba collaborated with his friend Joseph Kusaga, who was running Clouds Disco. Their collaboration led to the founding of Clouds Media Group in Arusha and later in Dar es Salaam. Clouds produces information and entertainment for young audiences that works to inspire and empower young Tanzanians to engage in finding entrepreneurial opportunities.

== Death ==
Mutahaba reportedly suffered from kidney problems, which led him to seek treatment in South Africa, where he died on 26 February 2019.

His death shocked Tanzanians, who expressed condolences for Mutahaba's contribution to the media and entertainment sector, strategic planning, youth talent development, promotion of a strong work ethic, and overall development of Tanzania. Over 100,000 people were estimated to have attended his funeral.
