= WCB Wasafi =

Tanzanian record label

- Founded: 2015
- Founder: Diamond Platnumz
- Status: Active
- Distributor: Ziiki Media Warner Music
- Genre: Bongo Flava Amapiano Afrobeats Singeli Baibuda
- Country of origin: Tanzania
- Location: Mbezi Beach, Dar Es Salaam
- Official website: www.wcbwasafi.com

Wasafi Classic Baby (WCB) is a Tanzania-based record label founded by musician Diamond Platnumz. WCB's commercial roster includes Diamond Platnumz, Mbosso, Zuchu, Lava Lava, Queen Darleen, and D Voice. The label is headquartered at Mbezi Beach, Dar Es Salaam. Rj the Dj who is also Diamond Platnumz's official DJ, while the official producer of the label is Lizer Classic. In 2017, the WCB Wasafi artists released a joint project titled Zilipendwa, and in 2020, they released their second single titled Quarantine. In 2021, WCB Wasafi signed a publishing and distribution deal with Ziiki and Warner Music Group.

== Artists ==
WCB Wasafi has signed six Tanzanian artists. Achievements include nominations for BET Awards, MTV Africa Music Awards, Tanzanian Music Awards and AFRIMMA Awards.

The label started in 2014 with the signing of Harmonize in 2015 who left the label in 2019 to start his label called Konde Music Worldwide.

Rayvanny joined in 2016 and left in 2022 to pursue his career in his newly founded label, Next Level Music. In 2020, Rayvanny announced the formation of his own label while remaining signed to Wasafi; he officially departed the label in 2022.

In April 2020, Zuchu was signed as the new and the second female member of the label.

In mid-2023, Diamond Platnumz announced that he had signed a new artist to the label. On 16 November 2023, Diamond Platnumz named D Voice as the new member of the WCB Wasafi label in a ceremony at the Superdome Arena in Dar Es Salaam.

WCB Wasafi signed artists and managers
Artist name	Year signed	Songs released
Harmonize	2015–2019	Aiyola, Matatizo, Nishachoka, Bado, happy Birthday, Niambie, Shulala, Sina, Atarudi, Paranawe, Kainama (with Diamond Platnumz & Burna Boy),
Queen Darleen	2016	Touch, Ntakufilisi, Kijuso, Bachela
Rayvanny	2016–2022	Give You All, Sugu, Natafuta Kiki, Siri, Zezeta, Kwetu, Mbeleko, Chuma Ulete, Unaibiwa, Makulusa
Lava Lava	2017	Tuachane, Kilio, Dede, Utatulia, Teja
Mbosso	2017	Nimekuzoea, Watakubali, Alele, Shida, Hodari, Tamu, Maajabu, Nadekezwa, Sonona, Ate, Amepotea, Sele
Zuchu	2020	Hakuna Kulala, Nisamehe, Kwaru, Wana, Raha, Ashua, Mauzauza, cheche, litawachoma, sukari, honey, nani
D Voice	2023	Umenifunza, Bam Bam, Nimezama, Mpeni taarifa, Zoba, Kijitu
