= Waka Waka (disambiguation) =

"Waka Waka (This Time for Africa)" is a 2010 song by Shakira and the official song of the 2010 World Cup.

Waka Waka, Wakka Wakka or variants thereof may also refer to:

- WakaWaka, an enterprise for solar products
- Waka waka (dance), a folk dance in Bolivia and Peru
- Wakka Wakka, or Waka Waka, an Aboriginal Australian people of the state of Queensland
  - Wakka Wakka language, an Aboriginal Australian language
- "Waka Waka", a song by Yemi Alade from the 2016 album Mama Africa
- Wakka Wakka Productions, a New York theatre company

== See also ==
- Waka (disambiguation)
- Wakka (disambiguation)
- Wagga Wagga, a city in New South Wales
- "Wocka Wocka!", catchphrase of the Muppet Fozzie Bear
- Onomatopoeia of Pac-Man eating
