= Youth advocate =

Person who acts in the best interests of the youth

A youth advocate is a person who acts in the best interests of the youth that they are working with. The overall purpose of a youth advocate is to ensure that youth maintain their human rights while aiding in skill development in all areas of life such as education, health, housing, employment, relationships, etc. A youth advocate aims to prevent youth from experiencing diminished self-esteem while interacting with adults who hold professional authoritative roles in their life. Examples of these adults are judges, lawyers, teachers, etc. Travis Lloyd, a speaker on the subject, describes a youth advocate as one who plays a significant supportive role in the social and legal processes in the lives of young people, especially homeless and foster youth who lack family support. In consideration of the legal aspects, the National Association of Youth Courts describes a youth advocate as a person who provides support to a youth respondent or defendant during a hearing.

A youth advocate additionally not only ensures that youth maintain their human rights, but also that their perspective and feelings about services or systems are heard. Many youth advocates have previous experiences that are similar to what the youth they are serving are experiencing themselves. This is important because it makes it easier for the youth advocate to empathise with their clients. Often, youth going through services or systems (whether it be mental health, juvenile justice, substance use issues, foster care, or homelessness) can be dehumanised, their opinions/feelings/insight ignored, and further traumatised. When a youth advocate (who understands what those situations can feel like) steps into a young persons life, it is often transformational for that youth and can lead them to a path of stability and success.

== See also ==
- Youth empowerment
- Youth work
- Court Appointed Special Advocate
- Guardian ad litem
