= Harmonize (musician) =

Tanzanian singer-songwriter

Background information
- Also known as: Konde Boy
- Born: Rajabu Abdulkahali Ibrahim; Mtwara Region, Tanzania
- Origin: Mtwara, Tanzania
- Genres: Bongo flava; Afrobeats; Afropop
- Occupations: Singer; Songwriter; Entrepreneur
- Instrument: Vocals
- Years active: 2015–present
- Label: Konde Music Worldwide

Rajabu Abdulkahali Ibrahim, known professionally as Harmonize, is a Tanzanian singer, songwriter, and entrepreneur. He first emerged on the national music scene in 2015 with the release of his debut single Aiyola after signing with WCB Wasafi, the label founded by Diamond Platnumz. Following his departure from WCB Wasafi in 2019, Harmonize established his own record label, Konde Music Worldwide, under which he has released several projects spanning genres such as Bongo Flava, Afropop, and Afrobeats.

Throughout his career, Harmonize has worked with many other African musicians, including Diamond Platnumz, Mwemezi M Burna Boy, Yemi Alade, Ruger, Sarkodie and Naira Marley.

== Early life ==
Harmonize has been living in Dar es Salaam since completing secondary school education in 2009.

He released his debut song, "Aiyola", in 2015. Other songs include "Kwa Ngwaru", featuring Diamond Platnumz, and "Show Me," featuring Rich Mavoko. In 2017, MTV Base (African TV channel) included him in their African edition of "Ones to Watch for 2017". He was the first artist to sign a recording contract with the Diamond Platnumz WCB Wasafi label and has since founded his own record label, Konde Music Worldwide.

== Career ==
He started his music career in 2011. In 2015, he met Diamond Platnumz and signed with WCB Wasafi. His first song, "Aiyola" was commercially successful. He won three awards from WatsUp TV, AFRIMMA, and AEA USA (in the US).

On 25 February 2019, he released "Afro Bongo", his first EP, which featured Diamond Platnumz, Burna Boy, Mr. Eazi and Yemi Alade. "Afro Bongo" had four songs with the Diamond Platnumz and Burna Boy assisted kainama, Tepete featuring Mr Eazi, Show me what you got featuring Yemi Alade and Niteke. Kainama's music video received more than 14 million views in 12 months.

Harmonize left WCB Wasafi at the end of 2019 and released several projects, including "The Return of Q Chillah". Harmonize released four commercial singles, including "Hainistui" and "Uno," both produced by East African hit-makers Hunter Nation and "Bonga".

Harmonize released his first studio album with 18 tracks, titled Afro East, on 14 March 2020. The work infuses Afropop with Singeli and Bongo Flava. The album included the single "Bedroom," produced by Hunter Nation.

Afro East is his first project since leaving Diamond Platnumz's record label and features Burna Boy, Lady Jay Dee, Phyno, Yemi Alade, Mr Eazi, Falz, Skales, Khaligraph Jones, Morgan Heritage, DJ Seven, Mr Blue, Prince Fahim, and several others.

On 5 November 2021, Harmonize released his second album, titled High School. The track list was revealed on the artist's Instagram page while he was on his 2021 American tour. The album was his first LP since Afro-East. The project was preceded by the previously released Amapiano hits "Sandakalawe and "Teacher". The first song on the album, "Sorry", was partly performed during a virtual concert by the artist held prior to the album's release.

The album had twenty songs, and only two had been heard before ("Sandakalawe" and "Teacher"). The album featured several prominent African acts, including Naira Marley, Sarkodie, Busiswa as well as labelmates Ibraah and Anjella. Also featured was the Tanzanian Singeli singer Sholo Mwamba. It marked a departure from the feature-heavy Afro-East as it had fewer features, with most songs helmed by Harmonize alone.

On 28 October 2022, Harmonize released his third studio album, titled Made for Us. The 14-track album featured Spice, Ntoshi Gazi, Abby Chams, and Bruce Melodie. A few days before the album was released, Harmonize announced on his Instagram that he would not promote the album because he had "done everything in the studio".

The album was critically acclaimed. Music in Africa's Charles Maganga dubbed the album the most personal album by Harmonize to date.

On 24 November 2023 Harmonize released his fourth studio album titled Visit Bongo, which was named by NotJustOk as the best Tanzanian album of 2023

On 30 January 2024 Harmonize released his single I Made It, which feature American rapper Bobby Shmurda and Kenyan singer Bien.

After leaving WCB Wasafi, Harmonize started his own record label, Konde Music Worldwide, (also known as Konde Gang) and signed different artists such as Ibraah, Country Wizzy, Anjella, Killy and Cheedy all of which have left the label with the exception of Ibraah.

In April 2025, Harmonize appointed Nigerian-born music executive, Geobek as his international artiste manager. In March 2025, Harmonize launched a two-day talent search for emerging artists in Lindi and Mtwara regions of Tanzania.

On October, his 2025 single "Me Too" featuring frequent collaborator Abigail Chams earned a Grammy consideration. On September 4, 2026 he released his sixth studio album titled "31", the 14-track project is named after the age he realized that life isn't the same as how he used to think and it explores themes of sobriety, overcoming internal battles, and navigating the weights of fame.

== Discography ==
=== Studio albums ===
- Afro East (2020)
- High School (2021)
- Made For Us (2022)
- Visit Bongo (2023)
- Muziki Wa Samia (2024)
- 31 (2026)

=== Extended plays ===
- Afro Bongo (2019)

=== Singles ===
List of singles, with year released and album name.
| Title | Year | Album |
|---|---|---|
| "Aiyola" | 2015 | |
| "Bado" ft. Diamond Platnumz | 2016 | |
| "Matatizo" | 2017 | |
| "Happy Birthday" | 2017 | |
| "Sina" | 2017 | |
| "Kainama" (ft. Burna Boy & Diamond Platnumz) | 2017 | |
| "Shulala” | 2018 | |
| "Akwa Ngwaru” | 2018 | |
| "Penzi” | 2018 | |
| "DM Chick" (ft. Sarkodie (rapper)) | 2018 | |
| "Nimwage Radhi” | 2018 | |
| "Love You” | 2018 | |
| "Timkere” | 2018 | |
| "Fire Waist” | 2018 | |
| "Atarudi" | 2018 | |
| "Paranawe" (ft. Rayvanny) | 2018 | |
| "Koma Roll” | 2018 | |
| "Afro Bongo” | 2019 | |

== Awards and nominations ==
| Year | Nominee / work | Award | Result |
|---|---|---|---|
| 2016 | Bado ft. Diamond Platnumz | WatsUp TV Africa Music Video Awards for Best African Newcomer Video | Won |
| 2016 | Himself | African Muzik Magazine Awards (AFRIMMA) for Best Newcomer | Won |
| 2016 | Himself | African Entertainment Awards (AEAUSA) for Best New Artist | Won |
