= Music of Tanzania =

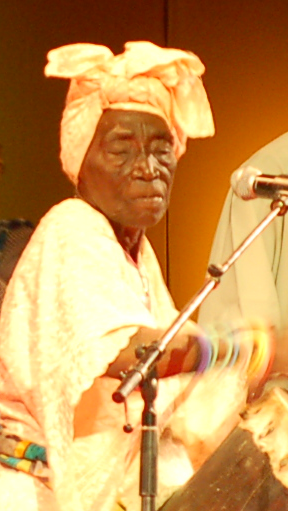
Bi Kidude Taarab Pioneer

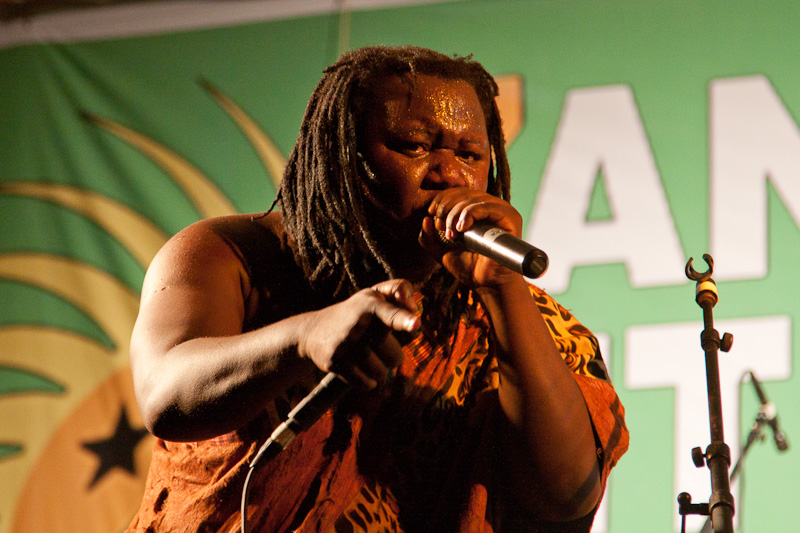
Poet Mrisho Mpoto

As it is in other countries, the music in Tanzania is constantly undergoing changes, and varies by location, people, settings and occasion. The five music genres in Tanzania, as defined by BASATA are, ngoma, dansi, kwaya, and taarab, with bongo flava being added in 2001. Singeli has since the mid-2000s been an unofficial music of uswahilini for unplanned communities in Dar es Salaam, and is the newest mainstream genre since 2020.

Ngoma (Bantu, meaning dance, drum and event) is a traditional dance music that has been the most widespread music in Tanzania. Dansi is urban jazz or band music. Taarab is sung Kiswahili poetry accompanied by a band, typically string, in which audience is often, but not always, encouraged to dance and clap. Kwaya is choir music originally limited to church during colonization, but now a secular part of education, social, and political events.

Bongo flava is Tanzanian pop music originated in the early 2000s from muziki wa kizazi kipya, meaning "Music of the new generation", which originated in the late 1980s. Kizazi kipya's dominant influences were reggae, RnB, and hip hop, where as the later bongo flava's dominant influences are taarab and dansi. Three recent influence on bongo flava are Afropop in the 2010s, as well as bongopiano and singeli. Singeli is a ngoma music and dance whereby a MC performs over fast tempo taarab music, often at between 200–300 beats per minute (BPM) while women dance. Male and female MCs are near equally common, however styles between MC gender typically differ significantly. Male MCs usually perform in fast paced rap, while female MCs usually perform kwaya.

From independence until 1993, all recording and distribution of music was strictly managed by BASATA, primarily through Radio Tanzania Dar es Salaam (RTD). Only the 4 Tanzanian genres were permitted to be recorded or broadcast, which at the time was ngoma, taarab, kwaya and dansi. The Broadcasting Services Act of 1993 allowed private broadcast networks and recording studios. In the few years prior to the 1993 Act hip hop had been established in Dar es Salaam, Arusha and Mwanza. It was transitioning from English performances to hip hop originated from uzunguni, rich areas like Oysterbay and Masaki with the international schools, to Kiswahili performances of kizazi kipya, originating in uswahilini Following the opening of the radio waves, bongo flava spread throughout the country, and the rest of the Great Lakes.

== Ngoma (dance) ==
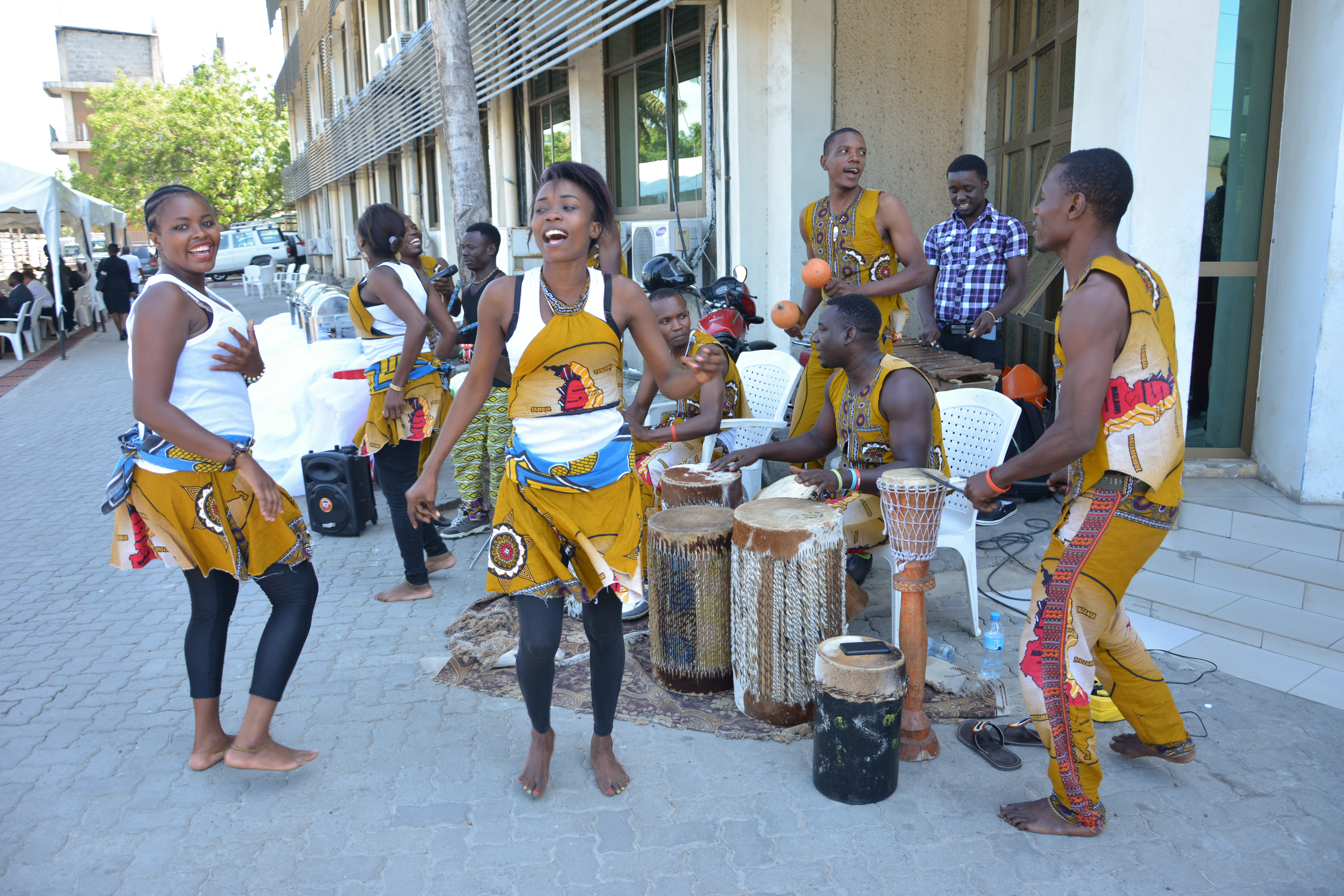
Tanzanian Ngoma group

Ngoma (Bantu, meaning dance, drum, and celebration) is an East and Southern African style of music, dance, and instruments, however in Tanzania, and other Swahili areas, also refers to events such as celebrations, rituals, or significant event in life such as giving birth or the passing of a loved one. The traditional forms of ngoma dancing prominently feature movements of the hips. It also features a large variety of instruments used, but most notable is the use of drums, specifically those that take the name from the style, ngoma drums. In some other cases, there may only be singing and dancing with no instruments used, such as the Maasai dances of Ambrokoi or the Wangoni dance of Ligihu. These are usually dances of jumping and stomping, providing the rhythms, and lots of singing.

Historically ngoma has been primarily 'traditional' as it passed from generation to generation however was prohibited in colonial times for being 'wicked' and 'primitive'. In more recent times, particularly after 1985, this has been changing with ngoma becoming both more modern, and fluid or creative. Whether for societal reasons or new economic realities, ngoma is being taught by elders to youth less and less today. Nevertheless, ngoma is still popular. More often youth are taking what they can learn about various dances from different sources, including varieties of people, tribes, and places, as well as other styles of music such as bongo flava to combine all of these inspirations into new forms of dance. This has been a source of generational resentment between elders and youths, with elders upset at the lack of authenticity of the youths' ngoma, and the youths upset at never being taught authentic ngoma as the elders were. While there has been this loss of traditional nature to ngoma over the past 40 years, it has evolved into its modern genre, often including the use of modern instruments. Many of the traditional instruments of ngoma are no longer possible due to the outlawing of hunting preventing the access to materials necessary for many instruments. As a result, modern instruments such as guitars are used, as well as electronic equipment such as microphones, amplifiers, and keyboards.

One example of the new styles being created is the UMATI troupe from Iringa town. They created their own dance using a combination of dances Lingunjumu and Sindimba from Southern Tanzania, Mdundiko from the coast, and Akasimbo from Kagera while incorporating bongo flava moves. Much in the same way bongo flava is designed to appeal to a broad audience, both genders, for economic and commercial reasons, modern ngoma often does the same. UMATI's dance incorporates dances from a broad geographic range, while also incorporating traditional ngoma inspirations that can appeal to the elders, and bongo flava inspirations that can appeal to the youth.

== Taarab (poetry) ==
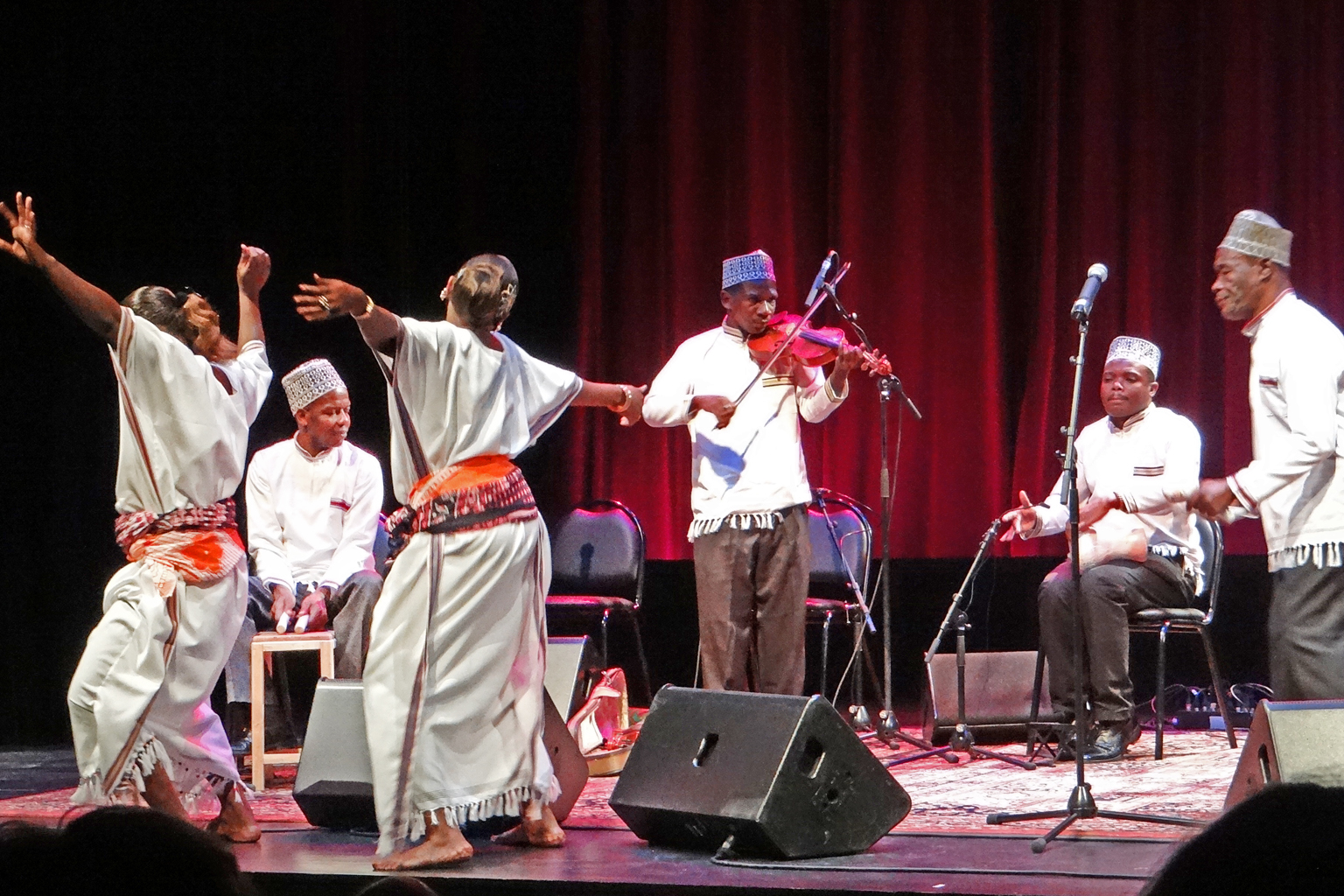
Taarab performance by Kithara Orchestra of Zanzibar performing in Paris, France

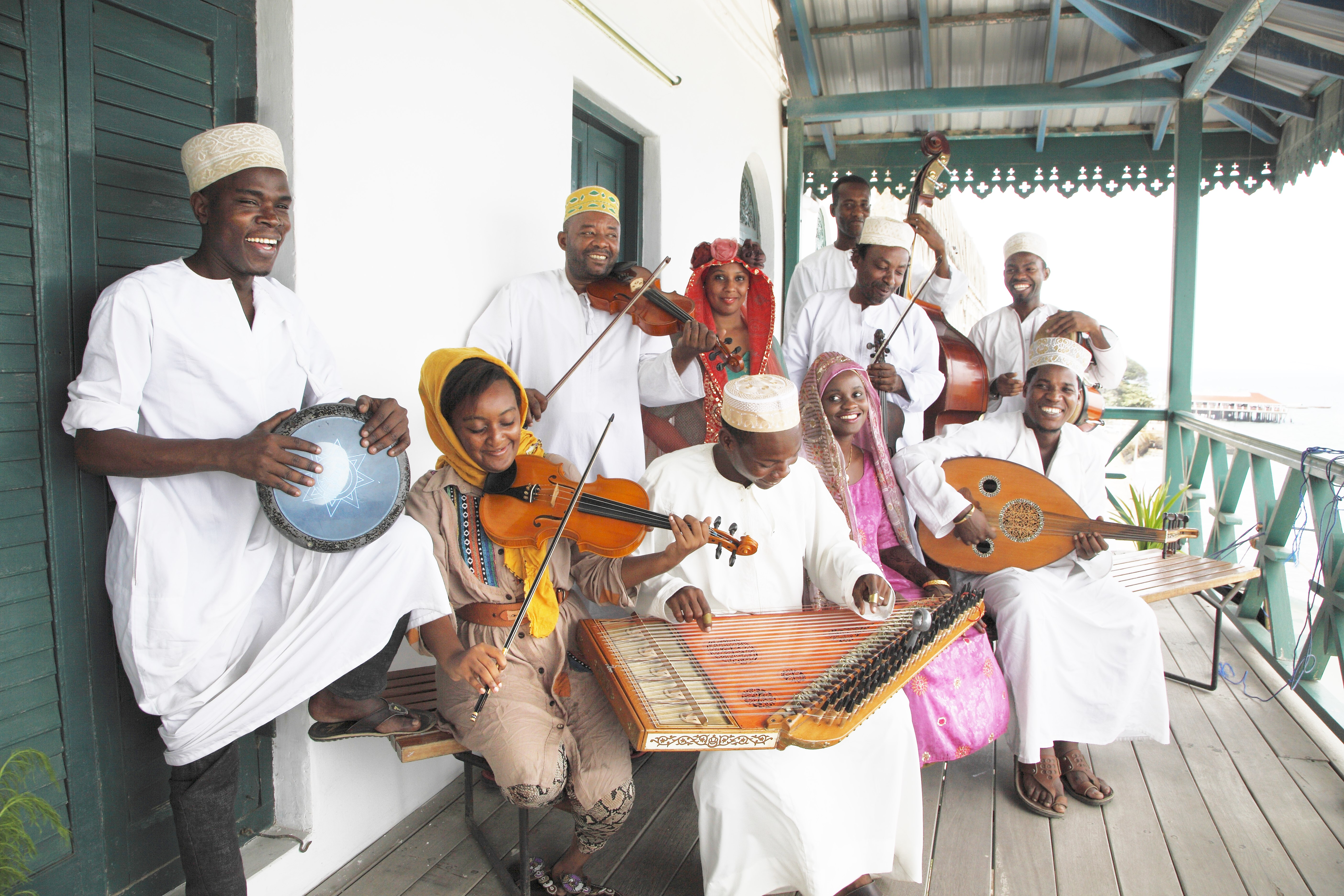
Taarab/Kidumbak Ensemble, 2015 by DCMA

Taarab is a music genre popular in Tanzania and Kenya. It is stage-performed music that consists of sung Kiswahili poetry, usually about love, accompanied by a band typically heavy on string instruments. Today the audience participates in dancing, cheering or clapping, occasionally singing, and rewarding the performers when appropriate. taarab music first arose on Zanzibar island around 1830s as a Swahili music with some influence by the musical traditions of the Mainland Great Lakes, North Africa (especially Egyptian instruments), the Arabia, and the Indian subcontinent. Taarab spread to the mainland and neighboring countries in the 1920s and rose to prominence in 1928 with the advent of the genre's first star, Siti binti Saad. Prior to the rise of muziki wa dansi (jazz), taarab was usually listed to by a sitting and attentive audience. Following the World Wars, and even more so after independence, the audience participates by dancing, clapping, and singing. Lyrically, leading into and during the independence movements of the 1950s, taarab began to address politics.

== Kwaya (choir) ==
Kwaya is a choir and a large part of Tanzanian life. It is practiced in school, church and even still events such as political rallies. Kwaya was originally a purely European form of music brought to Tanganyika by the Europeans and practiced in churches to the accompaniment of only European instruments, usually in European language. Gregory Barz described colonial use of kwaya in Tanzania as ‘‘one of the most highly developed tools used in the colonization and domination of land and people, body and spirit.’’

Following independence in 1961, the TANU government understood the usefulness of kwaya for secular purposes to create a national identity, and promote education and ujamaa. One of the first actions TANU undertook for the new nation was to create schools to educate the population, which at that time had less 5% literacy due to absence of schools. TANU created an education system, building schools in every village and neighborhood, and chose to make kwaya an instrumental aspect of education, as it still is today. This proved hugely successful, with Tanzania enjoying high literacy reaching 80% literacy in 18 years after independence. Alongside the kwaya troupes, TANU created and promoted ngonjera, a form of poetry as a dialog, debate, and praise usually for the TANU party. After 1985 and onto today, kwaya is still widespread, particularly in schools, and church, and as a powerful influence in other forms of music, but the use of both kwaya and ngonjera as a political tool is significantly diminished today, rarely used by CCM. The central role kwaya continues to play in early and religious life has helped make it highly influential music in Tanzania. Most singers learn how to sing in choirs at a young age, and kwaya is frequently featured in other forms of music, especially the very popular modern bongo flava.

== Muziki wa Injili ==
Muziki wa Injili (lit. "gospel music") is a genre of Christian church music in Tanzania that developed from church musical traditions dating back to the late 19th century. During this early period, church choirs mainly performed Western hymns that were translated into local languages. Beginning in the 1960s, some choirs started combining Christian lyrics with traditional Tanzanian melodies, often without instrumental accompaniment, although a few incorporated the harmonium or indigenous instruments such as drums and kayamba shakers. Unlike conventional church or art music, which is typically sung a cappella or accompanied by an organ or electronic keyboard, Muziki wa Injili is distinguished by energetic body movements, improvisational performance, and the incorporation of electric guitars and keyboards. The genre draws from a wide range of musical influences, including Congolese rumba, soukous, reggae, zouk, R&B, rap, salsa (charanga), and taarab. Rather than being formally written in staff or solfa notation, the music is predominantly "composed, transmitted and preserved orally and aurally". Performances are given by church choirs as well as solo musicians who record and market their music independently. The genre's increasing popularity has been supported by the growth of recording facilities, improvements in digital and internet technologies, and expanded opportunities for radio and television broadcasting, including stations owned by religious organizations.

== Dansi (jazz / band) ==
Dansi is a form of jazz or band music played for a dancing audience. With the great influence of Belgian Congo, and following the return of soldiers such as the King's African Rifles, new musical ideas of styles, marches, and instruments grew in popularity. With these new ideas dancing clubs started opening and becoming greatly popular in cities such as Dar es Salaam, Tanga, Ujiji, Morogoro, Tabora and many others. Following independence, the single-party government of TANU (later CCM) placed music as a central aspect of Tanzanian nationalistic identity, as laid out by President Nyerere. Mwalimu Nyerere spoke of focusing on African traditions rather than western traditions, and contrasted ngoma against muziki wa dansi, in his inauguration speech in on 1962.

"When we were at school we were taught to sing the songs of the Europeans. How many of us were taught the songs of the Wanyamwezi or of the Wahehe? Many of us have learnt to dance the ‘‘rumba’’ or the ‘‘chachacha’’ to ‘‘rock’n’roll’’ and to ‘‘twist.’’...But how many of us can dance, or have even heard of, the Gombe Sugu, the Mangala, the Konge, Nyang’umumi, Kiduo or Lele Mama? ... And even though we dance and play the piano, how often does that dancing ...really give us the sort of thrill we get from dancing the mganda or the gombe sugu even though the music may be no more than the shaking of pebbles in a tin? It is hard for any man to get much real excitement from dances and music which are not in his own blood."

— President Nyerere, Tanganyika Inaugural Address, 10 December 1962

In practice, however, both artist, the public, and his TANU government embraced, used, combined, and created from both traditional dance and modern jazz to establish and promote nationalism and Ujamaa (African Socialism) for the new nation. While there are always differences from tribe to tribe, to club to club, the nature of dance music in Tanzania is rarely limited and usually inspired by a large variety of sources. An example of this is the most famous Tanzania musician, Remmy Ongala when he would perform in Masai dress.

The first popular music craze in Tanzania was in the early 1930s when Cuban Rumba was widespread. Young Tanzanians organized themselves into dance clubs and bands, like the Dar es Salaam Jazz Band, which was founded in 1932. Local bands at the time used brass and percussion instruments, later adding strings. Bands like Morogoro Jazz and Tabora Jazz were formed (despite the name, these bands did not play American style jazz). Competitions were commonplace, a legacy of native ngoma societies and colonial beni brass bands.

Tanzania was influenced heavily after the 1960s by the influence of African and Latin music. Tanzanian soldiers brought back with them the music of these cultures, as well as Cuban and European music when returning from World War II. These musical influences fused and brought together the Tanzanian people. Eventually, the country and its people created their own style of music. This style, called "Swahili Jazz" is a mix of beats and styles of Cuban, European, Latin, and African music. Swahili jazz gave Tanzania a sense of independence and togetherness as a country.

Independence came in 1961, however, and three years later the state patronage system was set up, and most of the previous bands fell apart. Musicians were paid regular fees, plus a percentage of the gate income, and worked for a department of the government. The first such band is the Nuta Jazz Band, which worked for the National Union of Tanzania.

The 1970s saw the popularization a laid-back sound popularized by Orchestre Safari Sound and Orchestre Maquis Original. These groups adopted the motto "Kamanyola bila jasho" (dance Kamanyola without sweating). Marquis hailed from Lubumbashi in southeastern Zaire, moving to Dar es Salaam in the early 70s. This was a common move at the time, bringing elements of soukous from the Congo Basin. Kasalo Kyanga composed the 1985 hit "Karubandika", which was a popular dance song.

Popular bands in the 60s, 70s, and 80s included Vijana Jazz, who were the first to add electronic instruments to dansi (in 1987), and DDC Mlimani Park Orchestra, led by Michael Enoch. Rivalries between the bands sometimes led to chaos in the scene, as when Hugo Kisima lured musicians from Mlimani Park and disbanded the wildly popular Orchestra Safari Sound in 1985, forming the International Orchestra Safari Sound. International Orchestra Safari Sound was briefly popular, but the Orchestra Safari Sound was revitalized by Nguza Viking (formerly of maquis), who became a bandleader in 1991; this new group lasted only a year.

The most recent permutation of Tanzanian dance music is mchiriku. Bands like Gari Kubwa, Tokyo Ngma, and Atomic Advantage are among the pioneers of this style, which uses four drums and a keyboard for a sparse sound. Loudness is very important to the style, which is usually blared from outdated speakers; the resulting feedback is part of the music. The origin of the style is Zaramo wedding music.

Saida Karoli is a famous traditionalist Tanzanian female singer and performer, who sings in Haya. Karoli's music is described as natural with mellow vocals and hypnotically rhythmicism. Her songs Ndombolo Ya Solo or Maria Salome were huge hits in Tanzania and the countries around; she was nominated at the 2005 and 2006 Tanzania Music Awards in the Best Folk Album category and for the Best Female Vocalist category.

=== Mtindo ===
A mtindo (pl. mitindo) is simply a rhythm, dance style, and fashion identified with a particular band and refers to their ngoma, often from a particular locality or people. For example, Sikinde is associated with Mlimani Park Orchestra, Msondo with the Juwata Jazz Band, Ndekule with the Orchestra Safari Sound, and Bongo is associated with Remmy Ongala and his Orchestra Super Matimila. Some bands maintain the same mtindo throughout their career, while others change with new personnel or popular preference.

== Bongo Flava (pop) ==
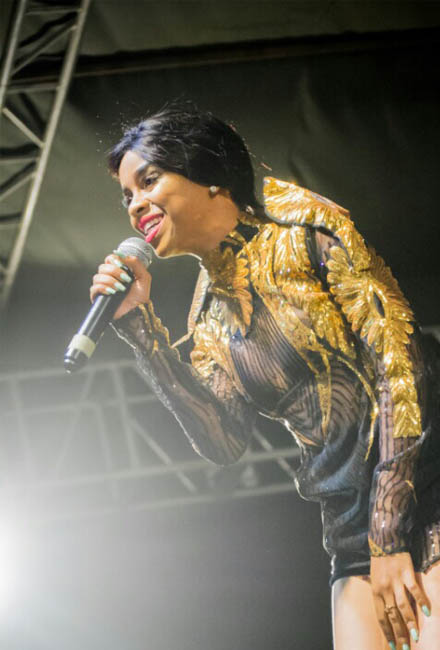
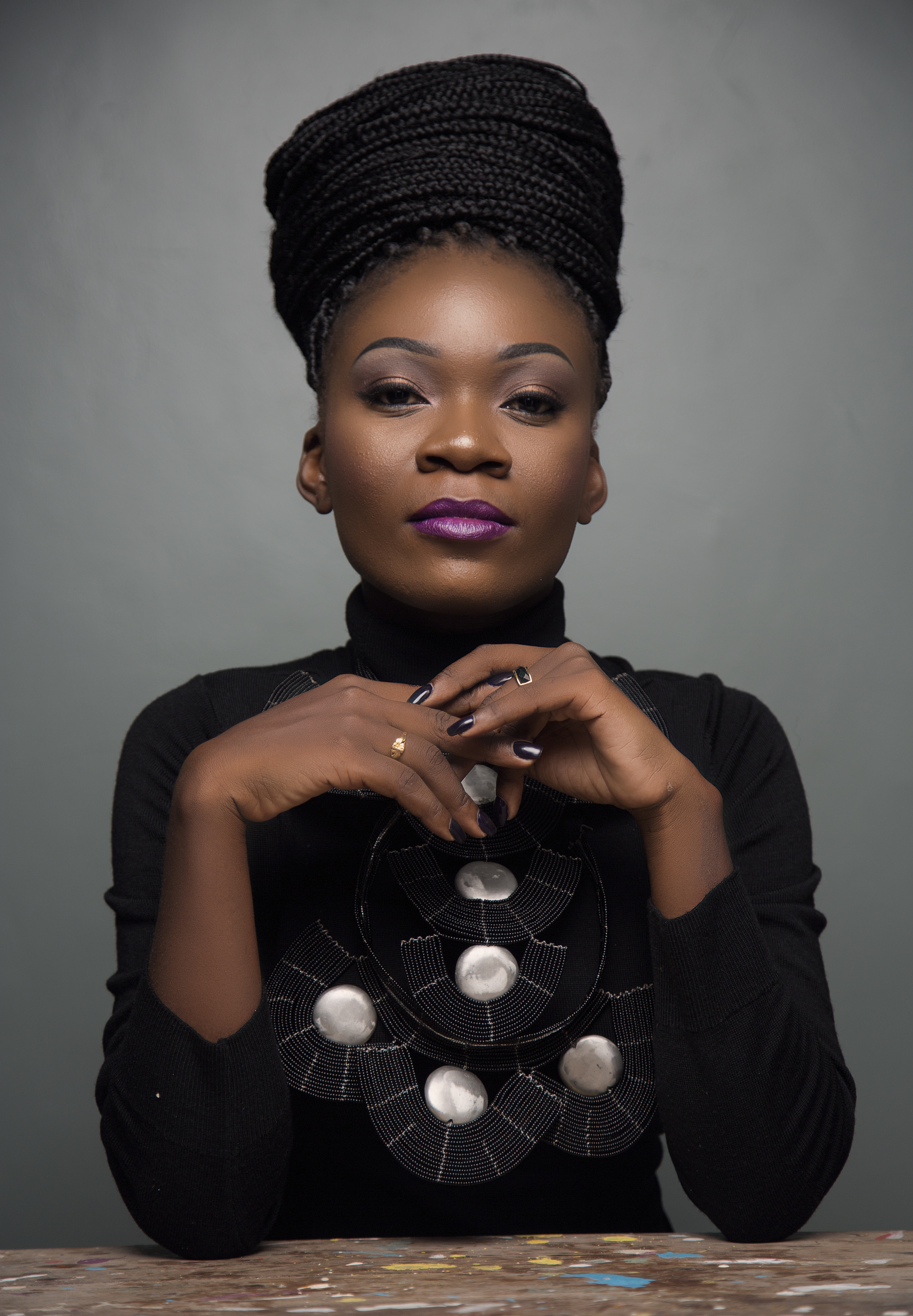

Bongo Flava is one of the newer Tanzanian genres, developed in the 1990s, and is a fusion genre. It is a continuation of muziki wa kizazi kipya, meaning "Music of the new generation" of the late '80s and early '90s. At its inception, bongo flava was more heavily influenced by US hip-hop and reggae, fused with Tanzanian music styles.

The current trend among Tanzanian music consumers has started changing from international popular music towards favoring products from their local artists who sing in Kiswahili. Popular artists include Kontawa, Barakah The Prince, Frida Amani, Maua Sama, Mavokali,Vanessa Mdee (Vee Money), Bill Nass, Diamond Platnumz, Harmonize, Jux, Alikiba, Shetta, Ben Pol, Lava Lava, Dully Sykes, Rich Mavoko, Rayvanny, Nandy. Some of the best known producers include Tudd Thomas, Mesen Selekta, Nahreel, S2Kizzy. and Yogobeats

One of the key aspects of bongo flava that has helped its success is its ability to use such a wide variety of all music types even within the same song, making it appealing to both men and women, a much larger and all-encompassing audience. In a survey conducted in Morogoro asking Tanzanians what their favorite type of music to listen to, 3/4ths of women and 4/5th of men responded bongo flava. However, after bongo flava the difference in listening habits of men and women diverged enormously, with women preferring kwaya and men preferring foreign hip hop.

=== Etymology ===
The name "Bongo" of Bongo Flava comes from Kiswahili usually meaning brains, intelligence, cleverness but can also mean mentally deranged. Bongo is the augmentative form of Ubongo, Kiswahili for Brainland. Flava is Kiswahili for Flavour. Ubongo is a term originally used, and in Tanzania still used, for the city of Dar es Salaam. Outside Tanzania, Ubongo is often referring to Tanzania. Ubongo as a term originated from a speech by President Nyerere in the late '70s during a very difficult time following both the global fuel shocks of the '70s and the Kagera war against Uganda. Mwalimu Nyerere spoke that only a nation using brains (using Kiswahili Ubongo for Brainland) could, and would, overcome the difficult challenges Tanzania was facing. Unfortunately, things became even worse for Tanzania, and by the early 1980s Dar es Salaam was calling itself mostly by the name Jua Kali (hot sun/world is spinning/dizzy) but also Ubongo. The term Ubongo was being used as a clever way to say both, survival in Dar es Salaam required brains and inelegance, but was also full of mentally deranged people.

In 1981 musician Remmy Ongala founded a band called Matimila. Each band has a unique mtindo (style/fashion) and Remmy Ongala's band Matimila named their mtindo "Bongo". Remmy Ongala would become the most famous musician ever for Tanzania, reaching global fame working with English singer Peter Gabriel.

=== Kizazi Kipya ===
In 1991, Tanzania hosted a hip hop competition called "Yo Rap Bonanza." While most rappers were performing American songs word for word; Saleh Ajabry, a Tanzanian, wrote his own Swahili lyrics to a song based on Vanilla Ice’s "Ice Ice Baby," and won the competition. Dar es Salaam's Kwanza Unit is the first Tanzanian hip hop crew, but technical limitations hindered commercial success. Mr. II and Juma Nature are the most famous Tanzanian rappers; Mr II's (then known as 2-Proud) "Ni Mimi" (1995) is the first major hit for the field. Groups like X Plastaz have moved away from American-style hip hop and incorporated Maasai vocal styles and other Tanzanian music styles. Tanzanian hip hop is often called Bongo Flava.

Tanzanian urban youth absorbed global hip hop music and produced their own varieties. With the increased medialization of Tanzania in the 1990s, Tanzanian urban youth have had more access to hip hop music, and the incorporation of global culture has become more prevalent and visible in urban Tanzania, not only in the music, but also in fashion, food, dance, and sports. Hip hop has essentially provided Tanzanian urban youth and young adults with a means of expressing themselves and forming an identity, such as the conceptual identity of msafiri (the traveler), a classic subject borrowed from Swahili lore, and a recurrent theme in Dar hip hop. While Tanzania hip hop is influenced by American hip hop it is also distinctly localized. Whereas American hip hop is the product of black urban youth and heavily influenced by race, Tanzania bongo flava took root in the slightly better off part of the city with those that more access to the Western world. Furthermore, Tanzania hip hop artist saw themselves as distinct from American artists in that they focus more on economic issues and less on violence"" Rapper Sam Stigilydaa put it poignantly when he said, "American rappers talk about crazy things-drinking, drugs, violence against women, American blacks killing blacks. I hope African doesn't turn crazy"

Prior to 2002 Kizazi Kipya, and its fans, were seen by most, particularly elders, as kihuni (culture of hooligans, trouble makers, drugs). With the release of 'Machozi, Jasho na Damu' (Blood, Sweat and Tears) in 2002 by Professor Jay, bongo flava reached widespread acceptance and appeal. Professor Jay's landmark album contained messages that resonated, and connected, to and with both the youth and elders of society. Songs such as "Ndio Mzee"(Yes Elder) and "Siyo Mzee"(No Elder) were political and funny while respectful and meaningful. 'Ndio Mzee' would go on to win best single in 2002. Along with the album as a whole it remains one of the most important and transitional moments in bongo flava's acceptance and spread.

=== Hip hop ===
Hip hop in Tanzania today is primarily a form of bongo flava. While Dar es Salaam is the center of Tanzanian and East African bongo flava and has a huge hip hop presence of its own, Arusha is seen as the center of hip hop in Tanzania and has a very large and important presence on hip hop for East Africa as a whole. As a greatly important international city home to many United Nations, African Union, East Africa Community, and many international NGO headquarters, the large international presence, along with many progressive organizations and dominant studios that have headed the city since 2000 like Grandmaster Records, has helped Arusha and its music scene has flourished with its festivals, community centers, and youth organizations. Okoa Mtaa Foundation being a most important and influential such youth organization, with its hip hop festivals. Okoa Mtaa is heavily influenced by the United African Alliance Community Center based in Arusha and founded by former Black Panthers. Other important hip hop collectives today are Ujamaa Hip Hop and Tamaduni Muzik.

Because of the massive hip hop artist and fan base in Northern Tanzania's Arusha city, today it is termed as East Africa's hip hop capital. Artists such as Chaba, Mo Plus, Fido Vato, Spark Dog Malik, JCB, Watengwa, Chindo aka Umbwax, Donii, Wadudu wa dampo, Jambo Squad, Nako-to-nako, Weusi, Nahreel and many others who are heading Tanzania's hip-hop music are from this city. There are other hip hop artists and crew like tamaduni music, kikosi kazi and artist like fid q, nikki mbishi, p the mc, dizasta vina, zaiid, the one incredible, mex cortez, cygon, mansu lii, nash mc, 6 o'clock, ghetto ambasador, songa, wakazi, afande sele, stamina, roma, jay moh, professor, chid benz as well as the upcoming artists like cado kitengo, man side, toxic fuvu, they conserve hip hop elements and originality, they are calling themselves "baba wa rap", the fathers of rap", they are from dar es salaam, they have to freestyle session event like kilingeni msasani club.

== Singeli ==
Singeli is a music genre that originated in Kinondoni in north-west Dar es Salaam in the mid 2000s, and has since the late 2010s spread throughout Tanzania, and since 2020 the surrounding Great Lakes. Singeli is a ngoma music and dance where a MC performs over fast tempo taarab music, often at between 200-300 beats per minute (BPM) while women dance. Male and female MCs are near equally common, however gender-related styles between MC differ significantly. Male MCs usually perform in fast paced rap, while female MCs usually perform kwaya.

In the early 2000s vigodoro, meaning all night parties, began being organized by women for their female relatives and friends in various uswahilini, particularly Manzese and Tandale. The parties involved playing cassette tapes of taarab music that other women would dance to. As vigodoro parties grew in popularity, MCs have been invited to come and perform over the cassettes. Msaga Sumu was one such MC and is considered one of the early founders of Singeli.

== Other music ==
=== National anthem ===
Mungu ibariki Afrika
National Anthem of Tanzania
National Anthem of Tanzania performed by United States Navy Band

The Tanzanian national anthem is Mungu Ibariki Africa (God Bless Africa), composed by South African composer Enoch Sontonga in 1897. The tune is the ANC's official song and later became the national anthem of South Africa. The melody is also the national anthem of Zambia. In Tanzania, Swahili lyrics were written for this anthem. - Another patriotic song, going back to colonial times, is Tanzania, Tanzania.

The renowned Tanzanian music artist Mbaraka Mwinshehe (June 27, 1944 - January 12, 1979) was the most popular and original musician of Tanzania, culminating in contributions to the "African rumba" movement arguably originated in the Congo from decades prior.He and other Tanzanian musicians contributed a lot to the development of Soukous claimed to originate from DRC and Congo Republic only.

Also, there was a greater influx of musicians from the Democratic Republic of Congo (formerly Zaire), who entered into Tanzania as refugees to then earn a living and relocate there. But in recent decades, mainly from the mid-1990s, a new generation of musicians has emerged to create popular music that is predominantly Tanzanian in form. Bands like Twanga Pepeta (African Stars Band), among others, created new and original Tanzanian sounds.

=== Reggae and dancehall ===
Jah Kimbuteh is the first major reggae star in Tanzania, beginning his career with Roots and Culture in 1985. Newer artists in the Tanzanian reggae genre include the Jam Brothers and Ras Innocent Nyanyagwa.

At present, Ras Nas is considered one of the best-known reggae musicians from Tanzania. Ras Nas combines reggae, afro, and dub poetry. Many musicians work in bands that play at a hotel, usually led by a keyboard and including a rock-based sound.

=== Rock ===
One of the most internationally famous rock musicians, Freddie Mercury, born Farrokh Bulsara into the Indian Parsi community of Stone Town, Zanzibar, moved to England after the Zanzibar Revolution overthrew British, and later Arab, colonial rule. He rose to worldwide fame as the lead singer, and a songwriter and instrumentalist of the rock music group Queen. Neither Freddie Mercury, nor the band Queen, ever performed in Tanzania. Their only African performance being the very controversial 1983 Works Tour where Queen disregarded UN Sanctions and performed in apartheid South Africa to widespread condemnation by audiences and artists worldwide. The Mercury House, a former home of the Bulsara family, opened as a souvenir store in Stone Town, Zanzibar, in 2002. It opened as a museum to Freddie Mercury on 24 November 2019.

== Distribution and access to music ==
The mushrooming of FM music stations and reasonable production studios has been a major boost to the music industry in Tanzania. Contemporary artists like Diamond Platnumz, Harmonize, Juma Nature, Nandy, Rayvanny, Ali Kiba, Lady Jaydee, Mr. Nice, Mr. II, Cool James, Dully Sykes, Professor Jay and many others command a huge audience of followers in the country and neighbouring countries.

More information about Tanzanian music and events can be found on the various web portals that have sprung up recently. Tanzania has an enormously high growth rate for internet technologies, estimated at up to 500% per year. Because costs for computers are still quite high, many users share connections at internet cafes or at work.naomba.com business directory, tanzaniadirectory.info Movie, and Sports information, and Arusha locality information all are part of an increasing number of websites dedicated to the region. Digital Tanzania music downloads are mostly done by free download websites and music platforms like iTunes, Google Music, etc.

== See also ==
- Sauti za Busara Festival
- Taarab
- Muziki wa dansi
