= The Rough Guide to the Music of Kenya and Tanzania =

Compilation album by Various artists
- Released: 5 November 1996
- Genre: World
- Length: 72:04
- Label: World Music Network

Full series chronology
The Rough Guide to Irish Music (1996)	The Rough Guide to the Music of Kenya and Tanzania (1996)	The Rough Guide to the Music of India and Pakistan (1996)

The Rough Guide to the Music of Kenya and Tanzania is a world music compilation album originally released in 1996. Part of the World Music Network Rough Guides series, it focuses on the music of Kenya and Tanzania, two countries which share Swahili as a common language. The release was compiled by Phil Stanton, co-founder of the World Music Network. Artwork was designed by Impetus.

Chris Nickson of AllMusic gave the album four stars, stating that while it may not be perfectly all-inclusive, it serves as an "excellent introduction" to the region's music. Michaelangelo Matos, writing for the Chicago Reader, named it as his favourite of the early Rough Guide albums, describing the record as "close to perfect."

== Track listing ==
No.	Title	Artist	Length
1.	"Mwongele"	Simba Wanyika	5:28
2.	"V.B. Pod Wamol"	Victoria Kings	4:55
3.	"Vunja Mifupa"	Samba Mapangala	5:31
4.	"Piny Ose Mer"	Daniel Owino Misiani & Shirati Jazz	5:49
5.	"Esiesi Siolle"	Abana Ba Nasery	5:19
6.	"Likuta Bibi"	Henry Makobi	3:52
7.	"Jacob Omolo"	Ogwang Lelo Okoth with Paddy J. Onono	3:53
8.	"Tanzania Yetu"	Master Musicians of Tanzania	8:35
9.	"Wagogo Initiation Dance"	'Moheme' Dance Tanzania	6:44
10.	"Edita"	Mlimani Park Orchestra	5:31
11.	"Usia Kwa Watoto"	Juwata Jazz Band	6:30
12.	"Mtindo Wa Mombasa"	Zein Musical Party	5:06
13.	"Sibadili"	Culture Musical Club	4:51

Professional ratings
Review scores
Source	Rating
AllMusic	4/5 stars
