= International Orchestra Safari Sound =

International Orchestra Safari Sound (sometimes shortened to IOSS) was a popular muziki wa dansi Tanzanian band from 1985 to 1992.

== History ==
The band was founded by Tanzanian businessman Hugo Kisima, who also owned another popular dansi band, the Orchestra Safari Sound. In 1985 he decided to disband Orchestra Safari Sound and create a new ensemble with talented musicians hired from major dansi bands such as Mlimani Park. Kisima chose singer Muhiddin Maalin Gurumo, guitarist Abel Balthazar, and singer-songwriter Hassani Bitchuka as the leaders of the new band.

The major mtindo (style) popularized by IOSS was ndekule, a word that is both a reference to traditional Tanzanian war dances and to a species of snakes. The snake thus became the icon of the band.

In the 1980s IOSS and Mlimani Park dominated the dansi scene. This came to an end between 1987 and 1989 when Bitchuka and Maalim left. In the early 1990s a new entry in the band's personnel, guitarist Nguza Mbangu (formerly Orchestra Maquis Original) revitalized IOSS for a while; Mbangu established a new mtindo, rashikanda wasaa, and wrote a big hit song, Mageuzi. Despite this, Kisima decided to disband the band in 1992.

Numerous music groups have positioned Tanzania on the international map. Indeed, regardless of the currently famed bongo flava, a type of music that has rattled entire sub-Saharan Africa, the post-independence era marked the growth and development of some of the lost famed musical groups in the East African nation. Among the most popular musical groups in post-independence Tanzania, perhaps the international orchestra safari sound (IOSS) was the most popular musical group in the nation. Typically, many music groups in Tanzania and greater east African in the post-independence era were aggressive in their marketing and strategic popularization approaches after emancipation and freedom from the British rule. Unfortunately, such aggressiveness was not usually beneficial since it led to the fragmentation of such music groups; as such, a few of such entities lasted beyond ten years before metamorphosing into disintegrated factions consisting of solo individuals. Hence, the IOSS adopted a similar trend, an aspect that restrained its lifespan from 1985 to 1992.

During its formative years, the IOSS was instrumental in inspiring various musicians that subsequently emerged to fame and steered Tanzania’s music industry to its current standings within the sub-Saharan entertainment industry. For example, research by Rosenberg (2011) illustrates an inextricable link between the music style of the IOSS as well as the current conventional famed trends of bongo flava. Precisely, the inherent need to reflect Tanzania’s culture and typical aspects of daily was an underlying core to the IOSS. Hence, the IOSS established a form and theme that underscored the principles and verbal art of Tanzania, which subsequently propagated to the current generation (Suriano, 2007; Graebner, 2019). Furthermore, even though the IOSS has initially been a reserved and mainly a conservative faction, it eventually inspired a generation of bongo flava that metamorphosed the Tanzania music to reflect the thriving urban culture and the new generation that had tasted globalization.
