= Cuban Marimba Band =

Tanzanian big band

The Cuban Marimba Band (previously known as La Paloma) was an influential Tanzanian big band from the city of Morogoro. It was founded in 1948 by Salum Abdullah, who had previously formed the Morogoro Jazz Band. For about twenty years, Cuban Marimba was one of the most popular muziki wa dansi (dance music) bands in Tanzania.

== History ==
Salum Abdallah was a prolific songwriter and musician who played guitar and mandolin. He was a "chotara," a person of mixed races.

The main themes of Abdallah's music were love, life wisdom, the good and evil of mankind, and even politics. One of his popular songs was "Mkono wa Idd", which is usually played on the radio during Idd festivities. Preceding Abdallah's death, the group released a twist tune, a departure from his suave rumba style, called "Hapo zamani sana" about the horrible colonial days in South Africa, and "Wanawake wa Tanzania wazuri sana," a tribute to Tanzanian women.

In 1965, Abdullah died in a car accident. While he was replaced by Juma Kilaza, but the band declined in popularity over the following years.

== Partial discography ==
- Various, Dada Kidawa - Sister Kidawa: Classic Tanzanian Hits from the 1960's (dansi collection including songs by Cuban Marimba Band, Kiko Kids, NUTA Jazz, Dar es Salaam Jazz Band)
- AVVV, The Tanzania Sound (dansi collection including songs by Cuban Marimba Band, Kiko Kids, NUTA Jazz, Dar es Salaam Jazz Band). Original Music 1986
- Salum Abdallah & Cuban Marimba, Ngoma Iko Huku, Dizim Asili Series vol. 1
