= Msafiri Zawose =

- Born: Msafiri Zawose; December 31, 1982 (age 43)
- Origin: Dar Es Salaam, Tanzania
- Genres: Afro-Fusion; Bongo-Fusion; Gogo-Fusion
- Occupations: Music Artist; Lamellaphone maker
- Instruments: Vocals; Marimba; zeze; ngoma; ilimba; flute
- Years active: (2003 - present)
- Website: msafirizawose.com

Msafiri Zawose is a Gogo musician from Tanzania. His name is associated with his traditional Gogo style music, which relies heavily on the zeze and ilimba in combination with distinct lyrical harmonies.

== Early life and career ==
Msafiri Zawose is the fifth child of Dr. Hukwe Zawose, The name Zawose is synonymous with Tanzanian music and tradition.

Surrounded by musicians and spending his days at the art college, Msafiri began learning music and picked up the ilimba at a young age. By his 13th birthday, he had already mastered all the signature Gogo instruments and was already touring widely throughout the country. His international debut was a three-month tour to Japan singing, dancing, and playing ndono, ngoma, and marimba with his father's group Chibite.

After his father's untimely death in 2003, Msafiri resolved to pick up where his father left off.

== Discography ==
Dawale Chouya was released before Msafiri's first appearance at Sauti za Busara in 2007.

=== Albums ===
Release year	Album name	Genre
2004	Msafiri Zawose	Gogo-Fusion
2007	Dawale Chouya	Gogo-Fusion
2013	Mbotela	Gogo-Fusion
2014	Tanganyika	Gogo-Fusion

== Concerts, tours and shows ==
- Sauti za Busara Festival, Zanzibar (2007)
- WOMAD, Abu Dhabi (2010)
- Lake Eden Arts Festivall, Black Mountain, North Carolina (May 11, 2012)
- Msafiri Zawose with Akoma Drummers @ Bossa Bistro Washington DC (June 28, 2012)
- Kuumba Festival, Knoxville, Tennessee (June 30, 2012)
- Sauti za Busara Festival, Zanzibar (2013)
- Pamoja Jam by APF Tanzania, Bagamoyo, Tanzania (May 11, 2013)
- DOADOA, Kampala, Uganda (2013)
- Sauti za Busara Festival, Zanzibar (2015)
- Ilimba Cultural Festival, Arusha, Tanzania (August 8, 2015)
- Center Stage (Summer-Fall 2016)
