= Tancut Alimasi Orchestra =

Tanzanian muziki wa dansi band

Tancut Alimasi Orchestra (or simply Tancut Alimasi) was a Tanzanian muziki wa dansi band. It was managed by the national society of diamond industries, and was based in Iringa. Its personnel included several musicians include Kasaloo Kyanga that were formerly in Orchestra Maquis Original.
