= Dirtwire =

American experimental music band

- Origin: United States
- Genres: experimental music
- Years active: 2012–present
- Members: David Satori; Evan Fraser
- Website: www.dirtwire.net

Dirtwire is an American band consisting of Evan Fraser, David Satori, and Mark Reveley, who all play a variety of uncommon musical instruments. They perform a form of swamptronica experimental music that incorporates electronic music and instruments from around the world.

The group, which is based in the San Francisco Bay Area of California, United States, began as a duo of Evan and David, with Mark joining in 2016. All three met at the California Institute of the Arts.

Dirtwire has released nine albums.

== Instruments ==
Dirtwire is known for incorporating a wide range of musical instruments from around the world. Their website says, "At a Dirtwire show you can be guaranteed to hear and see a wide range of instruments being played and woven into an electronic music context, including melodicas, guitarjo, electric space fiddle, drums, jaw harps, vocals, harmonica, ... overtone flutes, kamale ngoni, kalimba, toy megaphone, percussion, whamola, resonator guitar, fujara, ukulele, and Siberian ghost catcher mouthbow." They also play the Bolo, Dobro-style guitar, and the mbira, a Zimbabwean thumb piano. Their website previously listed the ilimba, slide guitar, slide banjo, jimbush, kone, guimbri, kaen, berimbau, pandeiro, zabumba, and calabash.

== Genre ==
Dirtwire lists possible genres for their music as "future revival, swamptronica, spaghetti-step, [and] electro-twang". In an interview, member Evan Fraser additionally offered, "blues n' bass, electro acoustic fusion, [and] globo electro."

== See also ==
- Avant-garde music
- Experimental music
- Ngoni (instrument)
- Beats Antique
