= Beni (music) =

East African form of brass band music

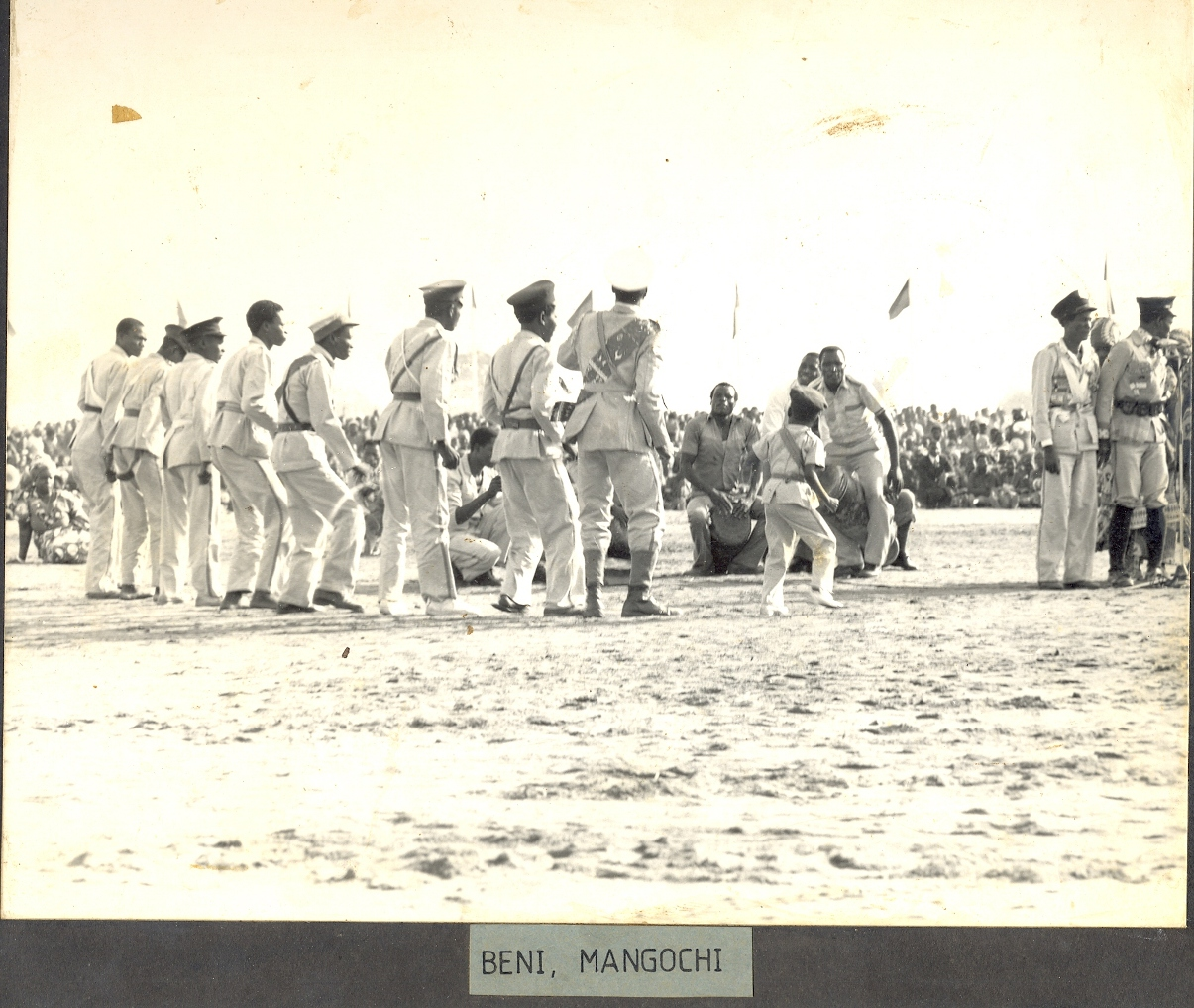
Beni dance performed in the Mangochi District of southern Malawi

Beni, also spelled Mbeni, is an indigenized East African form of brass band music and dance. The word beni derives from the English word "band." Beni appropriated symbols of colonial authority such as military drill, uniforms, and elaborate hierarchies.

The beni ngoma is a competitive dance genre based on a military drill performed to brass band music. The corresponding Beni dance was developed during the colonial era and mimicked military and colonial traditions with Africanized music and movement of the dancers. This kind of dance to brass music may also include Swahili songs. It is a popular form of wedding entertainment with a strong focus on rhythm and dance, and audience participation.

== History ==
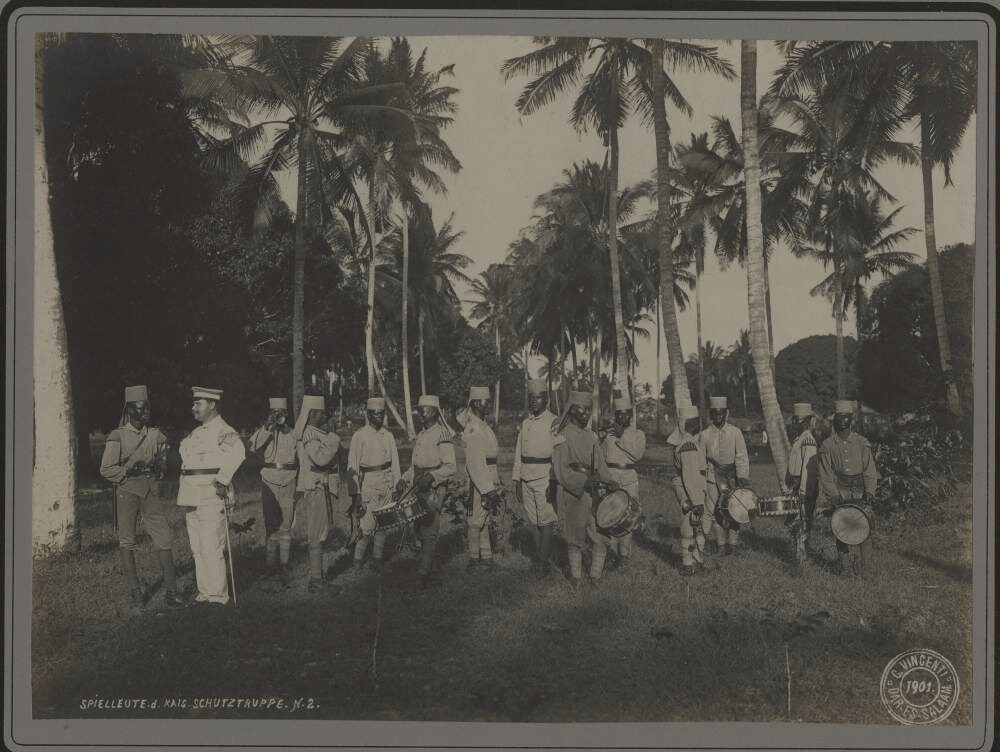
Military brass band of the Kaiser's Schutztruppe in German East Africa, 1901

Brass band music was performed in German East Africa and for British audiences in East Africa during colonial times. Further, it was also used by missionaries to introduce European culture to young people, for example in Zanzibar.

Beni had its origins in urban Swahili communities on the Kenyan coast in the 1890s, where it came to be part of the culture of competitions between neighbourhood cultural associations. Beni musicians used large military drums and brass instruments to interpret their new popular musical genre according to indigenous ngoma rhythms. According to ethnomusicologists Vander Biesen and De Beukelaer, the way Beni adapted European marching brass bands was an expression of the culture of upinzani (literally, the habit of opposition).

Around 1914, the style spread to Tanga and Dar es Salaam. The first accounts of Beni in Nyasaland date to around 1918. During the First World War, Beni was danced by askari soldiers. Prisoners of war also danced it in the detention camp at Zomba in Malawi, and by detachments of the 2nd KAR when they returned to Nairobi. Beni dancers were also instrumental in structured communication during the 1935 Copperbelt strike in Northern Rhodesia.

As Beni was adapted by Africans, western instruments were sometimes exchanged with local instruments, and march time was replaced by African cross beats and polyrhythm. In Kenya, for example, wooden wind instruments were substituted for western trumpets.

At the same time, in the late colonial period, Beni was a way for young people to express their independence. In 20th-century Zanzibar, Beni has been performed both as a street parade and stationary as a wedding dance. As Beni had never been as popular there as on the Swahili coast, the performance of a Beni band at the Sauti za Busara Festival 2009 was called an invented tradition for a tourist audience.

In 21-st century Dar es Salaam, so-called Matarumbeta (trumpets) bands with brass instruments, percussion and large marching drums have been playing for weddings and other joyous occasions.

== See also ==
- Music of Tanzania
- Ngoma music

== Literature ==
- Martin, Stephen H. (2017). "Brass bands and the beni phenomenon in urban east Africa". African Music. 7 (1): 72–81. doi:10.21504/amj.v7i1.1931. JSTOR 30249988.
