= FIFA 22 =

Football video game

EA Sports FIFA 22
- Current Gen Standard cover art featuring Paris Saint-Germain and France player Kylian Mbappé
- Developers: EA Vancouver; EA Romania
- Publisher: EA Sports
- Series: FIFA
- Engine: Frostbite 3
- Platforms: Nintendo Switch; PlayStation 4; PlayStation 5; Stadia; Windows; Xbox One; Xbox Series X/S
- Release: 1 October 2021
- Genre: Sports
- Modes: Single-player, multiplayer

FIFA 22 is a football simulation video game published by Electronic Arts. It is the 29th installment in the FIFA series, and was released worldwide on 1 October 2021 for Nintendo Switch, PlayStation 4, PlayStation 5, Stadia, Windows, Xbox One, and Xbox Series X/S. Players who pre-ordered the ultimate edition, however, received four days of early access and were able to play the game from 27 September.

Kylian Mbappé is the cover athlete for the second consecutive year.

In response to the 2022 Russian invasion of Ukraine, EA removed Russian national teams from all versions (since the 1.22 patch) of its football video games, and made Russian and Belarusian players ineligible for FIFA 22, except for those playing in foreign leagues.

The online servers for the game for Stadia were shut down on 18 January 2023, whilst the online servers for all other platforms were shut down on 4 November 2024.

== Features ==
=== HyperMotion Technology ===
FIFA 22 introduces "HyperMotion Technology", which uses motion capture data collected from 22 real-life players playing a complete, high-intensity football match in motion capture suits. The data collected from player movements, tackles, aerial duels and on-ball actions is used to power FIFA 22 gameplay. According to an EA Sports press release, FIFA 22 uses this data in its machine learning algorithm which uses over "8.7 million frames of advanced match capture" to generate life-like player movements and animations on and off the ball in real time. This "HyperMotion" feature is only available on the 9th Generation and Stadia versions of the game, and has given rise to the slogan "Powered By Football."

=== Career mode ===
A single player "career mode" is featured in FIFA 22, where the user can play as a player or manager throughout a 15-year career. FIFA 22 introduces a create-a-club option in manager career, allowing players to design a new club with customized kits, crest, and home stadium. Career mode introduces a level feature where users can advance their player by collecting experience points that unlock player skills and "perks" to improve stats.

=== Ultimate Team ===
FIFA 22 Ultimate Team is a game mode where users can create a team and play online or offline games to earn various cards like "FUT Heroes to add to their team. FIFA 22 Ultimate Team introduced "FUT Heroes" cards that represent different players with special ratings and attributes. The full heroes card list includes: Mario Gómez, Tim Cahill, Diego Milito, Jorge Campos, Fernando Morientes, Sami Al-Jaber, Robbie Keane, Abedi Pelé, Lars Ricken, Ole Gunnar Solskjær, Antonio Di Natale, Iván Córdoba, Freddie Ljungberg, Jürgen Kohler, Jerzy Dudek, Aleksandr Mostovoi, Joe Cole and David Ginola.

=== Card Kinds ===
1. Bronze Common & Rare
2. CONMEBOL Libertadores & Copa Sudamericana
3. Silver Common & Rare
4. Gold Common & Rare
5. FUT Heroes
6. Shapeshifters
7. Team Of The Year (TOTY)
8. Team Of The Season (TOTS)
9. Adidas Numbers-Up
10. Domestic Man Of The Match
11. POTM (Serie A, Ligue 1, Laliga Santander etc.)
12. Team Of The Week
13. TOTS TOKEN
14. SHAPESHIFTERS TOKEN
15. SHAPESHIFTERS Heros
16. FUT BIRTHDAY TOKEN
17. FUT Birthday
18. FUT Future Stars
19. Rulebreakers
20. FUT VS ICE
21. FUT VS FIRE
22. Road To The Finals
23. Road To The Knockouts
24. Team Of The Group Stage (TOTGS)
25. Flashback
26. FUT Fantasy Upgrade
27. FUT Fantasy
28. Silver Stars
29. FUT Captains
30. FUT Captain Heroes
31. Futties
32. Summer Swaps Tokens
33. Summer Swaps Tokens
34. FGS Swaps
35. Icons
36. Prime Icon Moments

In order to keep the users of the game entertained, promotions of the cards of the players are applied. These promotions are made when there are important events worldwide such as Christmas or Halloween. However, there are also promotions regarding events in the FIFA community such as the UEFA Champions League, UEFA Europa League or UEFA Conference League. Two of the most important promotions in the video game season are the team of the year (TOTY) where the best 12 players of the year are celebrated and the team of the season (TOTS) where the best players of the most advanced leagues are celebrated. important in the world. All of these promotions include improvements to player statistics, from physical attributes to sports attributes such as skill moves stars.

As in FIFA 21, notable former players are given "icon" cards, similar to "FUT Heroes". New players added for FIFA 22 include Iker Casillas, Robin van Persie, Wayne Rooney and Cafu. Players have the option to preview Silver and Gold player packs as in the previous game, by allowing players to preview what they would receive from a pack before deciding whether to purchase it. "Icon" cards are classified as extremely rare, the probability of getting one from a player pack is below 1%.

=== VOLTA Football ===
New VOLTA mechanics in FIFA 22 will allow players to trigger special abilities during a match that would boost a player's avatar in a specific attribute. There will be three Signature Abilities available: Power Strike, Pure Pace and Aggressive Tackle. Players of FIFA 22 will also have the opportunity to play with up to three players in various online mini game modes, which will be part of the new VOLTA Arcade.

=== Pro Clubs ===
Pro Clubs is a game mode where players are able to create their own virtual character, to take part in 11v11 online matches. Players can play with up to 10 other friends in an online match where each player controls their own virtual characters on the pitch. Players can also adjust the physical stature of their avatars, which has an effect on in-game abilities. A taller avatar, for example, would generally have a lower running speed than a shorter avatar. Pro Clubs avatars also improve over time as they play more games and perform well in matches. Players also have the ability to change a variety of features about their team, such as the team's crest, kits, and the stadium appearance.

=== Player Traits ===
Traits are qualities a player possesses that affect their behaviors in-game. Each trait has a specific function that relies on how the player is controlled, either by the user or computer. Traits are divided into four different categories: Standard traits, CPU AI traits, Career Mode traits, and VOLTA Football traits. The Standard traits influence the user's and CPU's control over the player, these traits consist of different kinds of shots, throw-ins, passing skills, dribbling skills, and player health. CPU AI traits offer similar skills compared to the Standard traits however, only influence the player when the computer controls them. Career Mode and VOLTA Football traits only impact the player in their respective game modes.

=== Licenses ===
The game features more than 30 officially licensed leagues, more than 700 clubs, and more than 17,000 players. For the first time, the Indian Super League and its eleven teams were added, as well as the UEFA Europa Conference League, the third tier of European club football established in 2021. New stadiums added in the game include the Estádio da Luz, home of S.L. Benfica, the Estádio do Dragão home of FC Porto, and the Nuevo Mirandilla, home of Cádiz CF. Additionally, in January 2022 via an update, the Brentford Community Stadium, home of Brentford, was added to the game, thus ensuring all 20 Premier League teams have their respective stadiums.

Juventus, Roma, Atalanta and Lazio are not featured in FIFA 22 due to licensing issues, and are instead known as Piemonte Calcio, Roma FC, Bergamo Calcio and Latium respectively. The game retains the players' likenesses, but the official badge, kits and stadiums are replaced with custom designs and generic stadiums created by EA Sports. Bayern Munich and Barcelona are also featured in the game with licensed players and kits, but do not have their stadium licenses and thus play in generic stadiums.

Following a November 2020 announcement by Canadian actor Ryan Reynolds and American actor Rob McElhenney, through the RR McReynolds Company LLC, that they would be taking over the club, Wrexham A.F.C. were included as part of the "Rest of World" section, becoming the first non-league team to be featured in the series. Wrexham's last appearance in the FIFA series was in FIFA 08, when they were relegated from League 2 to the National League.

==== Removals ====
In February 2022, EA Sports announced that the teams from the Russian Premier League and the Russia national football team will be removed from FIFA 22, FIFA Online and FIFA Mobile amidst the country's invasion of Ukraine. The announcement comes following the FIFA and the UEFA bans on Russian teams from competitions of both FIFA and UEFA on March 1, 2022. This came just weeks after EA removed Mason Greenwood from the game in light of sexual abuse allegations against the Manchester United forward (the player did not appear in any match since his arrest). In March 2022, EA suspended Diego Maradona from FIFA 22 following a legal dispute which claimed EA had negotiated with the wrong party and therefore did not have the rights to use his likeness.

Japan's women national squad has also been removed.

=== Commentators ===
The English-language version of the game features two new commentators. Stewart Robson replaces Lee Dixon as co-commentator to Derek Rae, while Alex Scott replaces Alan McInally in the role of providing in-game score updates in Career Mode. Scott is a former Arsenal women's team player before retiring in 2018 when she became a pundit on Sky Sports and Match of the Day. Robson has made 150 appearances for Arsenal during his playing career before he retired to join Arsenal's media team and work as a commentator for various media outlets.

=== Soundtrack ===
FIFA 22 Soundtrack
Artist	Song
Area21	"Followers"
ArrDee	"Oliver Twist"
Baby Queen	"You Shaped Hole"
Binki	"Landline"
Caio Prado	"Baobá"
Casper Caan	"Last Chance"
Che Lingo ft. Tamaraebi	"Eyes on the Prize"
Chvrches	"Good Girls"
Elderbrook and Bob Moses	"Inner Light"
Feiertag featuring Msafiri Zawose	"Trepidation"
Garden City Movement featuring Lola Marsh	"Summer Night"
Girl in Red	"Apartment 402"
Glass Animals	"I Don't Wanna Talk (I Just Wanna Dance)"
Ali van Jay	"Air Horn"
Harvey Causon	"Tenfold"
Hendrix Harris	"The Hill"
Hope Tala	"Mad"
Inhaler	"Totally"
Behnam Bani	"Ghorse ghamar 2"
Joy Crookes	"Feet Don't Fail Me Now"
Jungle	"Talk About It"
Kero Kero Bonito	"Well Rested"
Kojey Radical ft. Lex Amor	"War Outside"
Kokoko!	"Donne moi, je te donne?"
Little Simz	"Fear No Man"
Loyle Carner	"Yesterday"
Luke Hemmings	"Motion"
Moodoïd featuring Melody's Echo Chamber	"Only One Man"
Morad	"Seguimos"
Musti and Jelassi featuring Gabifuego	"Fuego"
My Morning Jacket	"Love Love Love"
Pa Salieu featuring Slowthai	"Glidin'"
Abouzar Rouhi	"Salam farmandeh"
Polyamory	"Hallelujah"
Jafar	"Goodbye Party"
Pedro Capo	"Calma"
Seb	"Seaside Demo"
Shango SK	"High Way"
Sir Was	"Before the Morning Comes"
Swedish House Mafia featuring Ty Dolla Sign and 070	"Lifetime"
Terry Presume	"Act Up"
The Chemical Brothers	"The Darkness That You Fear"
TSHA featuring Trio Da Kali	"Demba"
V.I.C	"A Teen"
Willow Kayne	"Two Seater"
Yard Act	"The Overload"
Young Franco featuring Denzel Curry and Pell	"Fallin' Apart"

FIFA 22 VOLTA Soundtrack
Artist	Song
84 Controller featuring Caitlyn Scarlett	"U & Me"
AC Slater, Darkzy and P Money	"Vibes on Tap"
Apollo BrownAitch featuring Avelino	"Party Round My Place"
AJ Tracey and Mabel	"West Ten"
Aluna	"Body Pump" (Sammy Virji Remix)
Amber Mark	"Mixer" (Preditah Remix)
Ares Carter featuring Charlotte Haining	"Out of Lives"
Armand van Helden and Riva Starr featuring Sharlene Hector	"Step It Up" (Zach Witness Remix)
Ashnikko featuring Kelis	"Deal with It"
EA featuring Hans Zimmer	"CL" (Remix)
Badmómzjay	"Tu nicht so"
Big Zuu featuring D Double E	"Variation"
Bklava	"Thinkin' of You"
BLOODMOON	"Disarm"
Bluey	"Wine It"
Brockhampton featuring Danny Brown	"Buzzcut"
Abouzar Rouhi	"Salam farmandeh"
Madgal	"Chera"
Choomba featuring LP Giobbi and Blush'ko	"Say It"
Cobrah	"U Know Me"
Cole LC featuring Adz	"Westbrook"
Reza Pishro	"Asare Manfi"
Dan D'Lion	"Good Times to Come"
DJ Snake and Malaa	"Pondicherry"
DRS and Mozey	"Dance the Night Away"
Earthgang featuring Future	"Billi"
Firebeatz	"Let's Get Down"
Flohio	"Whiplash"
Headie One featuring Young T and Bugsey	"Princess Cuts"
Hermitude	"Hyperparadise" (Flume Remix) [GANZ Flip]
Hybrid Minds featuring Grace Grundy	"Bad to Me"
JAE5 featuring Skepta and Rema	"Dimension"
Jay Prince	"In the Morning"
Jimothy Lacoste	"Describe a Vibe"
John Newman	"Love Me Again" (Vice Remix)
Kah-Lo	"Commandments"
Kent Jones featuring Rick Ross	"Bout That"
Keys N Krates	"Brazilian Love Song"
Kream	"Take Control"
Lice (Aesop Rock and Homeboy Sandman)	"Ask Anyone"
Lorde featuring Run The Jewels	"Supercut" (El-P Remix)
LoveLeo featuring Rico Nasty	"Tung Tied"
Machinedrum featuring Dawn Richard	"Do It 4 U"
Major Lazer featuring Sia and Labrinth	"Titans" (VIP Remix)
Manga Saint Hilare and Lewi B	"Don't Just Sit There. Do Something"
MK XYZ	"Geaux"
Mr Jukes and Barney Artist featuring Kofi Stone	"Check the Pulse"
Neon Nights featuring Outlaw The Artist	"Shining"
Noisy	"24/7"
Nutty P and PAV4N	"Moves"
NVDES	"Out with a Bang"
Odeal	"More Life"
Orang Utan	"Who's Your Love?"
P Money and Silencer	"Doing Well"
PAV4N and Kromestar	"Stasis"
Rêve	"Ctrl+Alt+Del"
RL Grime and Isoxo	"Stinger"
Saint Bodhi	"Blessed"
Seeyousoon	"Ben Affleck"
Shay D	"Talk of the Town"
Shygirl	"Siren"
Statik Selektah featurting Joey Bad4ss	"Watch Me"
Stylolive, Los Rakas and Happy Colors	"Uno 2 Tres"
Terrell Hines	"Otherside"
The Chemical Brothers	"The Darkness That You Fear"
The Dirty 33 and Bobbie Johnson	"Glowed Up"
Verb T and Illinformed	"Low Notes"
Xvoto	"Brainfreeze"

== Release ==
=== Editions ===
FIFA 22 is available as two editions, a Standard Edition and an Ultimate Edition. Whilst previous games in the series have included a Champions Edition, FIFA 22 does not have one. Players who pre-ordered the Ultimate Edition were granted a variety of bonuses plus four days of early access.

==== Standard Edition ====
The standard edition of FIFA 22 has a price of $59.99 on previous generation consoles such as PS4 and Xbox One; and a price of $69.99 on new generation consoles such as PS5 and Xbox Series X. Players who pre-ordered the standard edition were entitled to the following bonuses:

1. Team of the Week 1 Player Item
2. Kylian Mbappe Loan Item
3. FUT Ambassador Loan Player Pick
4. Career Mode Homegrown Talent

==== Ultimate Edition ====
The ultimate edition of FIFA 22 released with a price of $99.99 on all consoles. Players who pre-ordered the ultimate edition were entitled to the same bonuses as the standard edition, plus the following benefits:

1. Untradeable ‘Ones to Watch’ Player Item
2. 4,600 FIFA Points
3. Dual Entitlement: Free upgrade to new generation consoles
4. Four Days of Early Access

=== Ambassadors ===
FIFA ambassadors are normally well-known current or retired players that are featured on the cover, loading screens, in Ultimate Team packs and in advertising campaigns. Son Heung-Min, David Alaba, Christian Pulisic, Phil Foden, Alphonso Davies and Trent Alexander-Arnold were named as the official ambassadors of the game. Television presenter and singer Yūka Kageyama was appointed ambassador for the Japanese market.

== Reception ==
Reception

Aggregate score
Aggregator	Score
Metacritic	(PC) 73/100 (PS5) 78/100 (XSX) 78/100

Review scores
Publication	Score
Game Informer	7/10
GameSpot	8/10
GamesRadar+	3.5/5
IGN	7/10 (NS) 2/10
Nintendo Life	(NS) 2/10
Push Square	8/10
The Guardian	4/5

=== Critical response ===
FIFA 22 received "generally favorable" reviews for the PlayStation 5, Xbox Series X, and PC versions of the game, according to review aggregator website Metacritic. The Nintendo Switch version, however, was widely panned by critics due to being largely unchanged from its predecessor, FIFA 21 (which itself was largely unchanged from FIFA 20 and FIFA 19). In a review of the game by Bleacher Report, FIFA 22 was said to be the franchise's best release in years with its HyperMotion feature. Some of those improvements include players reacting to impacts from strong passes and more agile players being noticeably more flexible and swift. Moreover, the popular video game review website, IGN, states that FIFA 22 takes advantage of the graphical power of new generation consoles with deeper and more immersive visual effects. IGN also stated that the FIFA 22 soundtrack was one of the most comprehensive playlists in recent years.

==== Loot box criticism ====
In a report from the Norwegian Consumer Council, the use of loot box mechanics in FIFA 22 was examined as a case study.

The report was highly critical of the system, for instance estimating that to get a Team of the Year Kylian Mbappé promo card, on average the player would have to purchase a grand total of 847 Jumbo Rare Player Packs, spending nearly 1.7 million FIFA Points, or roughly €13,500. It also stated that if the player wanted to aim for this card without spending real life money, the player would have to play continually for over three years to earn enough points to buy the average number of packs needed.

After examining some of the mechanisms used in the game to incentivize players to make in-game purchases, the report stated that "It appears obvious that the design and mechanisms driving in-game purchases in these games are predatory, manipulative, and exceedingly aggressive, targeting consumer vulnerabilities at every opportunity".

=== Sales ===
77% percent of FIFA 22 sales were digital downloads during the first week after its release, which is a significant jump from 62% for last year's installment in the franchise, FIFA 21. As of December 2021, EA stated that over 9 million copies of FIFA 22 were sold worldwide, with more than 460 million matches played. Data analytics firm, GFK, stated that FIFA 22 was the top-selling game in 17 out of 19 European nations covered within their research, with Mario Kart 8 Deluxe following closely behind.

=== Awards ===
Year	Award	Category	Result
2021	The Game Awards 2021	Best Sports/Racing Game	Nominated
2022	25th Annual D.I.C.E. Awards	Sports Game of the Year	Nominated
2022	Guild of Music Supervisors Awards	Best Music Supervision for a Video Game	Winner

== Professional tournaments ==
FIFA 22 Global Series is a series of online tournaments hosted by EA Sports. The tournaments are held exclusively on PlayStation 5 where players participate in teams of one or two for in-game rewards and cash prizes. In order to qualify for the tournament, users must compete in their respective regions for high standings in the leaderboard or compete in Global Series Opens. Global Series Opens are tournaments that host the highest ranked players in their regions with winners getting cash prizes of $3,500–10,000.

== See also ==
- Pro Evolution Soccer
- List of best-selling video game franchises
