= The Zawose Queens =

Tanzanian band

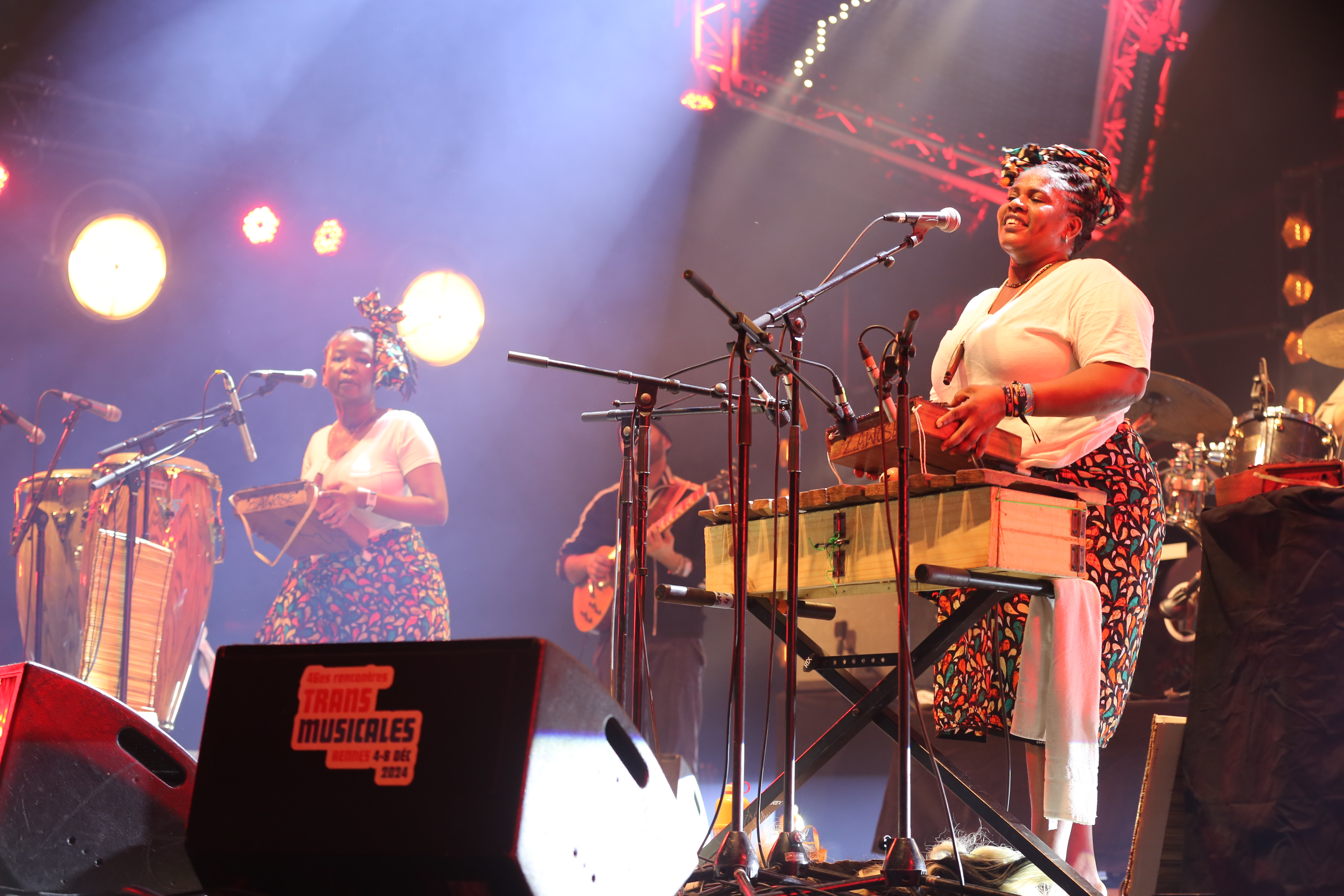
- The Zawose Queens at Trans Musicales, 2024

Background information
- Origin: Bagamoyo, Tanzania
- Years active: 2019–present
- Labels: Real World Records
- Members: Pendo Zawose; Leah Zawose
- Website: thezawosequeens.com

The Zawose Queens are a band from Bagamoyo, Tanzania, comprising relatives Pendo and Leah Zawose. Their music incorporates traditional Wagogo styles and electronic production. The Zawose Queens' debut album Maisha was released in 2024.

== History ==
Pendo Zawose is the daughter of Hukwe Zawose, an internationally known musician who released three albums on Real World Records. Hukwe Zawose had seven wives and seventeen children; Pendo started performing with the family band at 14, but as a woman was not permitted to sing lead vocals. After Hukwe Zawose's death in 2003, Pendo began to lead the family band The Zawose Family, and they released the album Small Things Fall from the Baobab Tree in 2007. Leah Zawose is Pendo's niece and Hukwe's granddaughter.

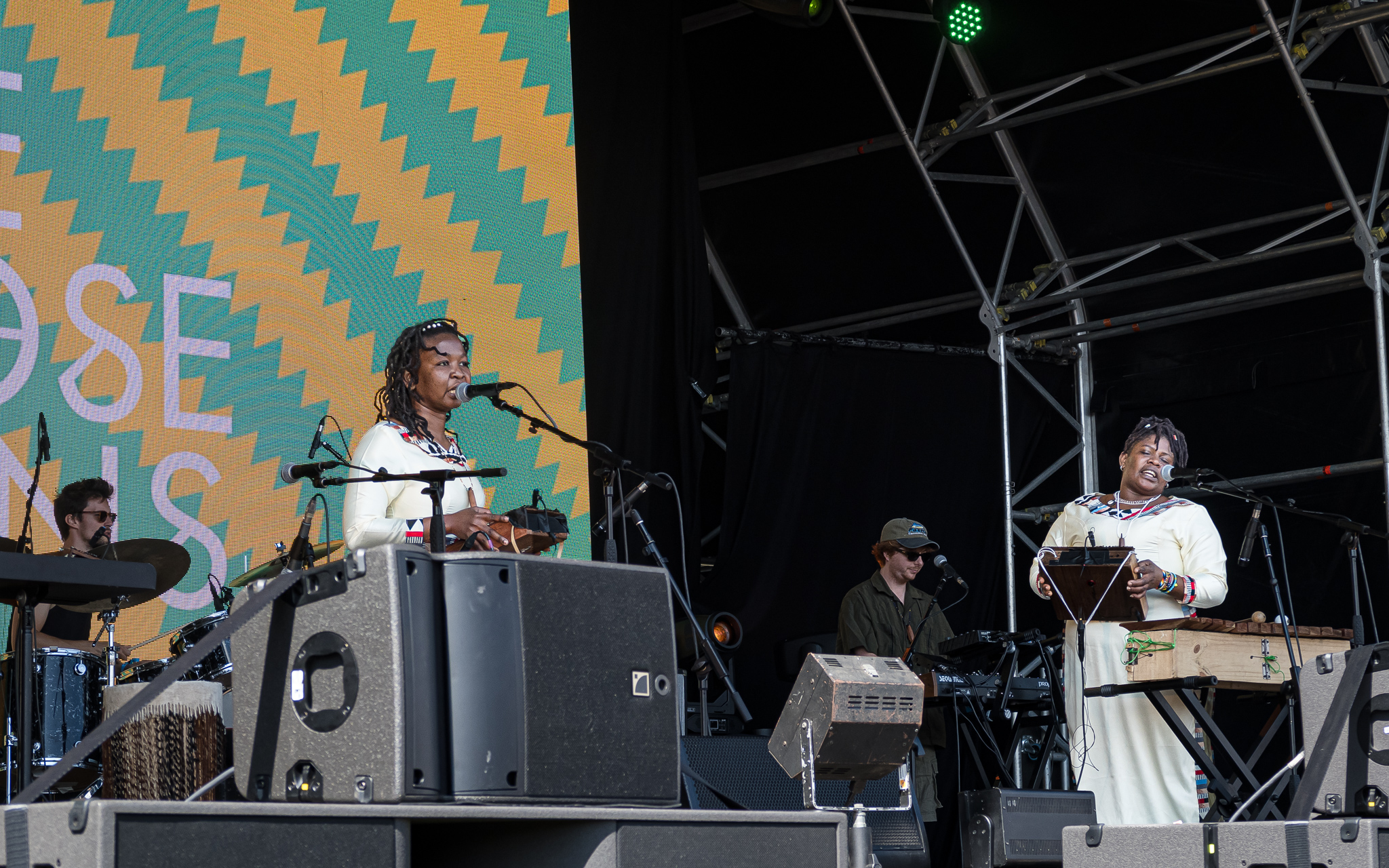
The Zawose Queens at WOMAD UK, 2024

Leah and Pendo Zawose began writing music together after performing at Sauti za Busara in Zanzibar in 2019. The Zawose Queens' debut album Maisha was released on 7 June 2024 on Real World Records. The four-piece Wamwiduka Band from northern Tanzania feature on the album.

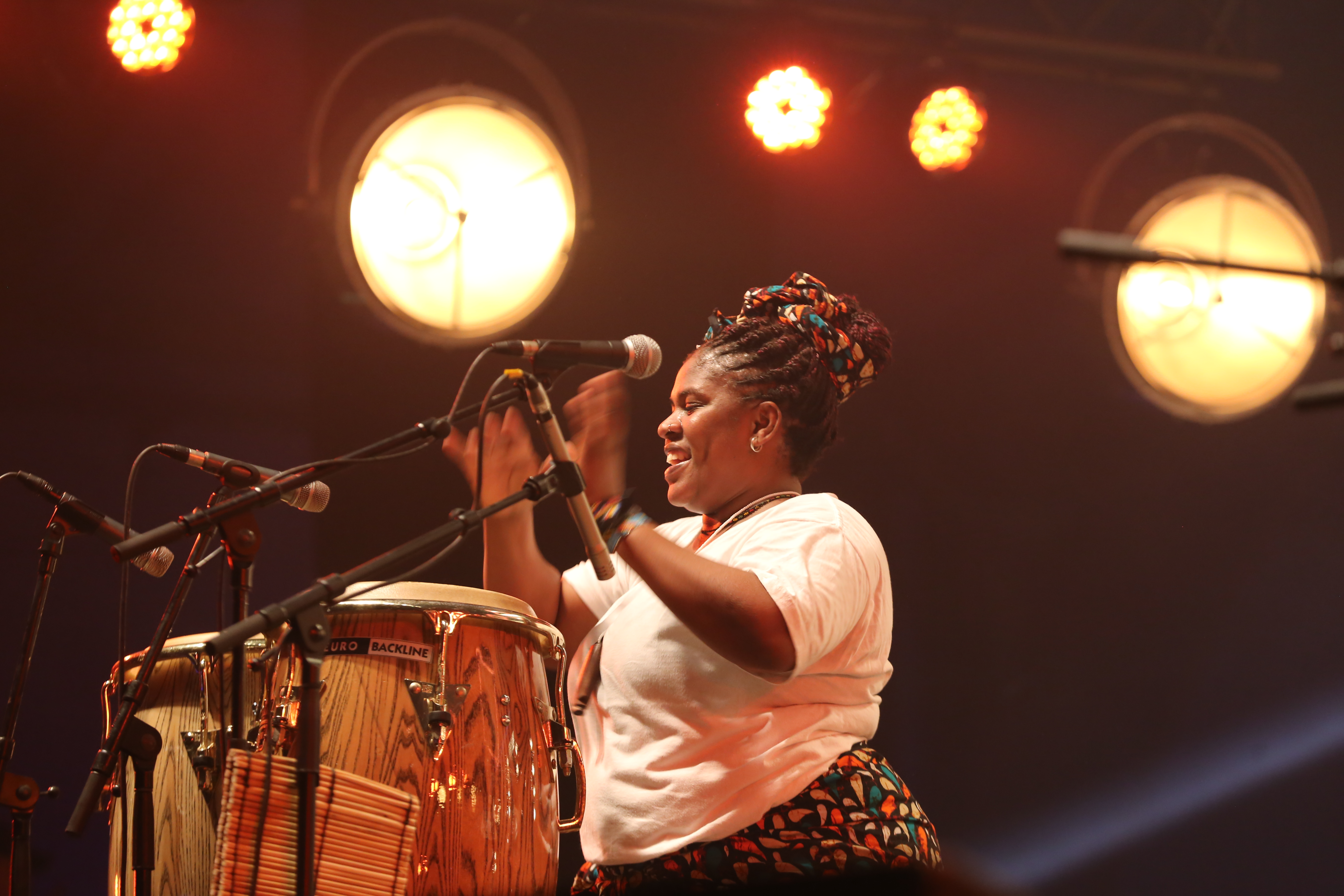
The Zawose Queens at Trans Musicales 2024

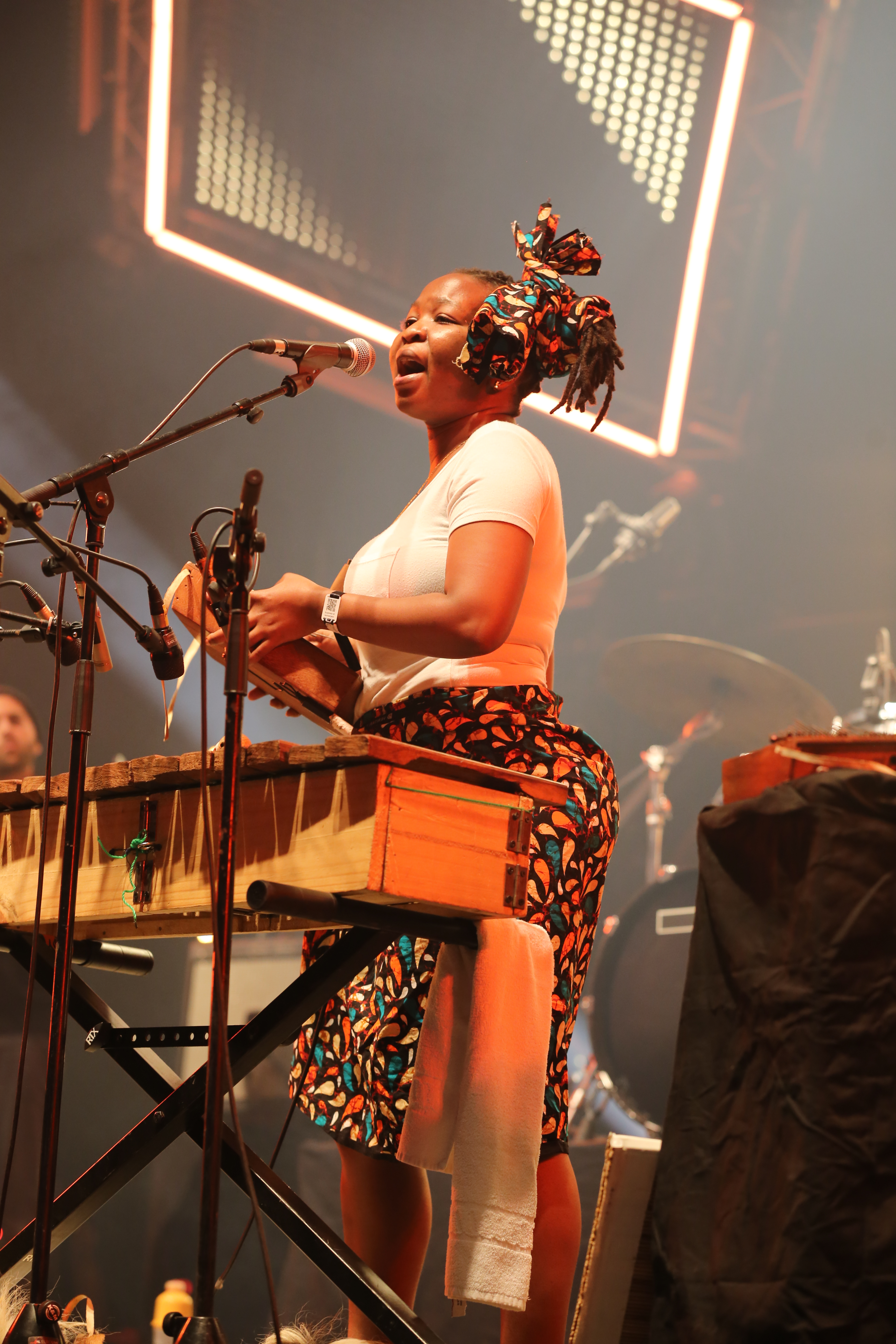
The Zawose Queens at Trans Musicales 2024

== Discography ==
Albums

- Maisha (2024, Real World Records)
