= Kyanga =

Kyanga may be:

- Kyanga language
- Kasaloo Kyanga, Congolese musician, guitarist, and composer
