= DDC Mlimani Park Orchestra =

Tanzanian muziki wa dansi band

DDC Mlimani Park Orchestra (Mlimani Park for short) has been one of the most popular Tanzanian muziki wa dansi bands.

Mlimani Park Orchestra was founded on 1 August 1978 by former Juwata Jazz Band members Muhiddin Maalim, Abdallah Gama, Cosmas Chidumule, Joseph Mulenga Michael Enoch and Abel Balthazar; they were later joined by Hassan Bitchuka and Suleiman Mwanyiro from Juwata Jazz Band. They started as the resident band of the Tanzania Transport & Taxi Services owned by Mlimani Park Bar in Dar es Salaam, the organization that also managed the band. When Tanzania Transport & Taxi Services went bankrupt around 1982, the bar and management of the band were taken over by the Dar es Salaam Development Corporation (DDC), part of the city council, and the band became DDC Mlimani Park Orchestra.

In the 1980s, Mlimani Park released a string of popular hits, mostly written by Bitchuka, Cosmas Chidumule, and Shaaban Dede.

With respect to other muziki wa dansi bands of the 1980s such as Vijana Jazz, that was known for its technical innovations (e.g., electronic instruments) or and Orchestra Maquis Original, that frequently changed their mtindo (style), Mlimani Park stuck with the dansi tradition. The motto of the band was ngoma ya ukae ("the home dance"). In their long career they remained faithful to a single mtindo, called sikinde, which in turn was inspired by traditional Tanzanian dances (ngoma).

== Partial discography ==
Albums

- Sikinde (collection of hits, Africassette 9402)
- Sungi (Popular African Music 403)

Contributing artist

- The Rough Guide to the Music of Kenya and Tanzania (World Music Network RGNET 1007)
- The Rough Guide To Psychedelic Africa (World Music Network RGNET 1270)
