= Ras Nas =

Tanzanian musician

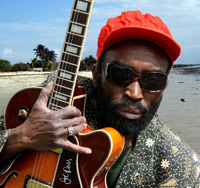
Ras Nas aka Nasibu Mwanukuzi

Ras Nas (born in Morogoro), aka Nasibu Mwanukuzi, is a musician and poet from Tanzania who blends African music and reggae with a dash of poetry. Ras Nas' latest album, Dar-es-Salaam, contains roots reggae, soukous and dub poetry. It is released by Kongoi Productions. Dar es Salaam has received a five star review in one of Norway's biggest dailies, Dagsavisen.

Recently, Ras Nas was featured on BBC World Service, The Beat program. The weekly program, reaching millions of listeners worldwide, is presented by Mark Coles. Other artists on the program were Wyclef Jean and Zoe Rahman.

Among Ras Nas merits is sharing stage with Bob Dylan, Van Morrison and Lou Reed at the Norwegian Wood Festival. Ras Nas has also warmed up for a number of reggae heavyweights like Luciano, I Jah Man, Linton Kwesi Johnson and Junior Delgado.

Ras Nas' latest CD Dar-es-Salaam contains a mix of reggae and African music, soukous. In this CD Ras Nas has worked with a number of musicians from nine different countries. These include Norwegian blues guitarist and singer Knut Reiersrud, Rolf Erik Nystrøm, Keppy Kiombile from Kilimanjaro Band, Norman Bikaka from Shada Band and drummer Uriel Seri from Ivory Coast.

Ras Nas aka Nasibu started writing African poetry at the age of 17 and experimented with various forms of African chanting and African drumming. Ran short of paint. Studied Law at the University of Dar es Salaam where he graduated with an LLB degree in 1984. Ras Nas has worked as a journalist for Daily News as well as a correspondent for Africa magazine, covering mainly cultural issues.

During his youth Ras Nas listened to a lot of Tanzanian music by guitarists like Wema Abdallah, Mbaraka Mwinshehe and his Likembe Mahoka style (from Morogoro), Segere Matata (from Tabora) as well as Michael Enok of Dar Jazz, from Dar es Salaam.

Other influences is from the Congolese maestros like Luambo Makiadi and his T.P OK Jazz, Dr. Nico of African Fiesta Sukisa and countless other African musicians who have helped to mold African music and inspired another generation of musicians. More impulses came from Caribbean music of the late 1960s which was popular in East Africa. Also influenced by the early reggae greats, the likes of Bob Marley, Burning Spear, Gregory Isaacs, and Linton Kwesi Johnson, to name but a few. All this has helped to shape Ras Nas' musical style.

In 1982 Nasibu co-founded a powerful poetry and drama group Sayari in Dar es Salaam. The group combined African music, poetry, miming, dance and drama and toured extensively in Scandinavia. Moved on to Oslo in 1985 to study Mass Communications at the University of Oslo, UIO.

In 1985 he initiated "Umoja" group in Oslo which blended traditional African music and dance. He also co-founded Artists for Liberation, a forerunner to Nordic Black Theater. In 1989 he published his first collection of African poetry, Double Focus, (Kongoi Productions). Together with Reginald T. Oliver (Papa Lion) and James Toney Jr., he formed Nasibu and the Dual Vision, a trio that performed rhythmic poetry coated with vibrant African chanting, harmonies and drumming. The trio changed its name to The Cold Fire, bringing in a Zimbabwean bassist, Clive Brown, and produced a music cassette during a tour in Germany.

In 1990 Nasibu went solo and formed his own band under his artist name, Ras Nas. The band had a début concert in July 1991, at a party to mark the 99th anniversary of Emperor Haile Selassie I. The party was organized by the Rastafari Cultural Foundation in Oslo. The year after, Ras Nas performed for Nelson Mandela, celebrating his release from Robben Island prison. This happened in Oslo, on Mr. Mandela's first visit to Norway.

In 1997 he produced Ras Nas's début CD Cut You Loose, (Kongoi Productions). (RNCD9701), working together with Charles Mena from Nicaragua; Chuck Frazier, a musician from Texas; and Ishamel de Leon from Trinidad.

Ras Nas tracks can also be found in other music compilations, the most notable being AMUN Tropical Acts vol.1, a compilation by African musicians living in Norway and RAW 2000 by Reggae Ambassadors Worldwide.

== Some earlier festivals ==
Spring Festival 2010, Cairo and Beirut - May 2010
Galle Music Festival, Sri Lanka - December 2009
Oslo World Music Festival - 3 November 2007
Oslo Mela - 18 August 2007
World Performing Arts and Music Festival - Lahore (Pakistan). Nov. 2006
Oslo Mela Festival (with Ngoma Rhythms). August 2006
Zanzibar International Film Festival (with Mandingo Trio). July 2006
