= The Rough Guide to Irish Music (1996 album) =

Compilation album by Various artists
- Released: 1 October 1996
- Genre: World, Irish music
- Length: 70:20
- Label: World Music Network

Full series chronology
Best of Africa (1995)	The Rough Guide to Irish Music (1996)	The Rough Guide to the Music of Kenya and Tanzania (1996)

The Rough Guide to Irish Music is a world music compilation album originally released in 1996. The fourth release of the World Music Network Rough Guides series, the album covers both the Republic and The North, with an overall focus on tradition and revival. The compilation was produced by Phil Stanton, co-founder of the World Music Network.

== Track listing ==
No.	Title	Artist	Length
1.	"Solid Ground"	Dolores Keane	3:54
2.	"Tommy Peoples / The Windmill / Fintan McManus'"	Altan	3:17
3.	"Coinleach Ghlas An Fhómhair"	Clannad	5:46
4.	"On Horseback"	Eileen Ivers	3:10
5.	"Season of Mists"	Kevin Crawford	2:49
6.	"The Lakes Of Pontchartrain"	Déanta	5:01
7.	"The White Petticoat / The Kerry Jig / Katy Is Waiting"	Patrick Street	4:37
8.	"Terry 'Cuz' Teahans Polka / Murphy's Polka / O'Sullivan's Polka"	Sliabh Notes	2:59
9.	"Molly and Johnny"	Dervish	3:51
10.	"Humours Of Lissadell / Music In The Glen / Johnson's"	Joe Derrane with Carl Hession	4:18
11.	"The Boys Of Malin / The Gravel Walks"	Ciaran Tourish & Dermot McLaughlin	3:06
12.	"Dulman / Charlie O'Neill's Highland"	Cran	3:29
13.	"Mist On the Mountain / Three Little Drummers"	Brendan Larrissey	3:04
14.	"Untitled / Untitled / Hand Me Down The Tackle"	Siobhan O'Donnell, Karen Tweed, and Andy Cutting	3:05
15.	"Colm Cille Na Féile"	Maighréad Ní Dhomhnaill	4:52
16.	"Sod of Turf / Katie Goes to Granny"	Martin Murray	3:02
17.	"O'Connel's March/ Galway Bay Hornpipe / The Banshee's Wail / Over The Mangle Pit"	Martin Hayes	5:18

Professional ratings
Review scores
Source	Rating
Allmusic	3/5 stars
