= Abana Ba Nasery =

Musical group from Kenya

Abana Ba Nasery was a musical group from Kenya. The group was led by Shem Tube (vocals & guitar), backed by Justo Osala (guitar) and Enos Okola (percussion). The group came from Bunyore, Western Province.

The group existed in the 1960s and 70s before disbanding. Afterwards Tube and Osala formed a new group Les Bunyore. In 1989 the Globe Style label released internationally a compilation CD Classic Acoustic Recordings from Western Kenya, containing Abana Ba Nasery's songs from the 60s and early 70s. Abana Ba Nasery reformed in 1991. The same year they were touring in Europe, during which a new album, Nursery Boys Go Ahead, was recorded.

Since then the bandleader Shem Tube has not actively pursued his musical career, but still as of 2009 gives rare performances.

== Discography ==
Albums

- Classic Acoustic Recordings from Western Kenya (1989, Globe Style)
- Nursery Boys Go Ahead (1992, Globe Style / Green Linnett)

Contributing artist

- World Roots Volume 3: Live At Melkweg (1991, Milkyway Cassettes)
- World Widest Your Guidest (1992, Globe Style)
- Strictly Worldwide! (1993, Eurostar)
- The Rough Guide to the Music of Kenya and Tanzania (1996, World Music Network)
- Authentic Music From Festivals & Celebrations Around The World (1998, Ellipsis Arts, Global Celebration series)
- Passages: Authentic Music From Around The World Celebrating Life's Turning Points (1998, Ellipsis Arts, Global Celebration series)
- Country Music Of Western Kenya: 45s From The Archive Of Shem Tupe (2017, Olvido Records / Raw Music International)
