= Chibite =

Studio album by Hukwe Zawose
- Released: 1996
- Label: Real World
- Producer: Richard Evans

Hukwe Zawose chronology
Tanzania: The Art of Hukwe Ubi Zawose (1994)	Chibite (1996)	Mkuki Wa Rocho (A Spear to the Soul) (2000)

Chibite is an album by the Tanzanian musician Hukwe Zawose, released in 1996. Zawose played the 1995 WOMAD Festival, leading to his association with Peter Gabriel. Chibite was Zawose's first album to be widely distributed.

== Production ==
Produced by Richard Evans, the album was recorded in England, with Zawose's son as the only other musician. Zawose played the chirimbo, an instrument similar to a thumb piano. Zawose, who wrote six of the album's songs, sang in Swahili. "Nghanga Msakuzi" is about the Tanzanian president Julius Nyerere. "Sisitizo la Amani Duniani" is about the bombing of Hiroshima. Zawose possessed a five-octave vocal range; he employed deep throat singing on Chibite.

== Critical reception ==
Professional ratings
Review scores
Source	Rating
AllMusic	4.5/5 stars
Robert Christgau	(3-star Honorable Mention)
Edmonton Journal	4/5 stars
The Encyclopedia of Popular Music	3/5 stars
MusicHound World: The Essential Album Guide	4/5 stars
The Sydney Morning Herald	4/5 stars

JazzTimes wrote that Zawose "creates a tantalizing and relatively de-westernized sound, spinning tales in Swahili with a voice that cyclical melodies around the undulating modal patterns on chirimbo." Robert Christgau deemed the album a "thumb-piano extravaganza." The Sydney Morning Herald determined that "the urgency of the chanting, the rhythms created by Zawose's ankle bells, the sonic waves emanating from the jzezes, all conspire to create a sound that sounds like the performance of a party of hundreds."

Westword noted that "anyone familiar with, say, James Brown, will find his body reacting to the persuasive, push-and-pull rhythms over which Zawose shouts, cries and celebrates." The Edmonton Journal praised Zawose's "wise, chant-like, raspy refrain." The Boston Herald listed Chibite as one of the best albums of 1996.

AllMusic wrote that "Zawose's powers are in full effect, singing in his native tongue and playing traditional instruments that range from flutes and violins to thumb pianos and various percussion to create a rich sound that rings with an infectious vibrancy."

== Track listing ==
No.	Title	Length
1.	"Sisitizo la Amani Duniani"
2.	"Chilumi"
3.	"Ibarikiwe Mungu Yupo Duniani"
4.	"Munyamaye"
5.	"Nyangawuya"
6.	"Nghanga Msakuzi"
7.	"Jende Chiwuyaje Kukaya"
8.	"Sauti Za Kigogo"
9.	"Safari Na Muziki"
10.	"Twendeni Sote Na Mwanga Wa Amani"
