= Nursery Boys Go Ahead =

Studio album by Abana Ba Nasery
- Released: 1992
- Recorded: 1991
- Length: 53:36
- Label: Globe Style; Xenophile
- Producer: Globe Style

Abana Ba Nasery chronology
Abana Ba Nasery (1989)	Nursery Boys Go Ahead (1992)

Nursery Boys Go Ahead, also stylized as !Nursery Boys Go Ahead!, is an album by the Kenyan band Abana Ba Nasery. It was released in 1992. The band, a trio, traditionally produced its sound with just their voices, acoustic guitars, and a Fanta bottle. The album is considered to be Luhya pop and folk music.

== Production ==
The album was produced by staff at Globe Style. It was recorded while the band was touring Great Britain, in 1991. Members of 3 Mustaphas 3 and the Oyster Band contributed to the album. Ron Kavana played on "Esimiti Khusilenje", which chronicles an accident that led to a broken leg.

== Critical reception ==
Professional ratings
Review scores
Source	Rating
AllMusic	3/5 stars
Chicago Sun-Times	3/4 stars
Robert Christgau	(1-star Honorable Mention)
MusicHound World: The Essential Album Guide	4.5/5 stars

The Boston Globe listed Nursery Boys Go Ahead as one of the best albums of 1992, labeling the band a "surprising guitar-and-Fanta-bottle ensemble." Robert Christgau praised "Esiesi Siolle" and "Elira Yesu Ndayanza".

The Edmonton Journal called the album "delightful," and noted the addition of "strings, trumpets, pipes and percussion" to the band's traditional instrumentation. The Chicago Sun-Times wrote that "the guitars are lilting, the harmonies are rich and resplendent ... when bouzoukis, tenor banjo and uillean pipes are added to the mix, 'Esimiti Khusilenje' takes on the rhythm of a country-Irish hoedown, albeit in a Kenyan setting."

AllMusic opined that, "if all worldbeat attempts at fusion came off like this, we'd be living in a perfect world." MusicHound World: The Essential Album Guide considered the album "another low-key masterpiece," writing that "the main attraction remains the amazing fretwork of [Shem] Tube and [Justo] Omufila."

== Track listing ==
No.	Title	Length
1.	"Esiesi Siolle"	5:22
2.	"Abakambi"	3:52
3.	"Sumila Omusiele"	5:14
4.	"Omwana Wa Mberi Nesiekhoira"	3:08
5.	"Tumebeba Msalaba"	4:58
6.	"Esimiti Khusilenje"	6:11
7.	"Abakhasi Bano"	4:39
8.	"Elira Yesu Ndayanza"	3:39
9.	"Mabingwa"	4:51
10.	"Abandu Bandi"	6:40
11.	"Abebi Be Tsingombe"	4:59
