= Morogoro Jazz Band =

Tanzanian band

Morogoro Jazz Band, also known as K.Z. Morogoro Jazz Band (K.Z. standing for Kuliko Zote, Swahili for "better than the others"), was a seminal muziki wa dansi band from Morogoro, Tanzania. The band originally played live at the clubs and bars of Morogoro and became very popular in the 1960s and 1970s, receiving considerable airplay from Tanzanian radio stations. The leader of the band was guitarist Mbaraka Mwinshehe, who dropped out of school to join the band in 1965. Coincidentally, the band was formed the same year Mwinsheshe was born, in 1944. The original lineup of the band featured Makala Kindamile, Joseph Thomas, Seif Ally, Daudi Ally and Shaabana Mwambe. Salim Abdullah, who would later found Cuban Marimba Band, was also an early member of the band.

Mwinshehe left Morogoro Jazz Band in 1973 to found another very successful muziki wa dansi band, Super Volcano.

The Morogoro Jazz Band created a sound that was a fusion of many different influences, including taarab, Kenyan benga, Cuban son (through soukous, also known as Congolese rumba), rhythm and blues, and British pop music. Although the band was originally acoustic, it was the inclusion of the electric guitar that catapulted the band to the forefront of the Tanzanian music scene.

== Partial discography ==
- Ujamaa: The 1960s Sound of Tanzania, Buda Musique 860142
- Mbaraka Mwinshehe Mwaruka Soloist National 1968-1972, Tamasha CD TAM501
- Mbaraka Mwinshehe & Morogoro Jazz Masimango (Best of Tanzania 1969-72), Dizim

== See also ==
- Dar es Salaam Jazz Band
