= Ndala Kasheba =

Congolese singer and guitarist

- Born: Zaire
- Origin: Dar es Salaam, Tanzania
- Died: October 2004
- Genres: Congolese rumba • Muziki wa dansi
- Instrument: Guitar
- Years active: 1969–2004
- Label: Limitless Sky Records
- Formerly of: Orchestra Safari Sound

Freddy Ndala Kasheba (died October 2004) was a Congolese guitarist, singer, and bandleader who was based in Tanzania for most of his career.

== Life and career ==
In 1969, he emigrated from Zaire to Dar es Salaam, Tanzania. He became the leader of the group Orchestra Safari Sound in 1979, and remained its leader until leaving after a dispute with the owner of the band's equipment. He then started his own band, Zaita Musica, in addition to pursuing a solo career. His reputation in Tanzania was such that he became known in Dar es Salaam as "Maestro Supreme".

== Discography ==
- Yellow Card (Limitless Sky/Stern's, 2002)
