= Dizasta Vina =

- Born: Edger Vicent Mwaipeta; 17 February 1993 (age 33); Iringa, Tanzania
- Origin: Mbeya, Tanzania
- Genres: Hip hop
- Occupations: Rapper, songwriter, record producer
- Years active: 2012 - Present
- Label: Panorama Authentik
- Website: https://dizastavina.com

Edger Vicent Mwaipeta (born 17 February 1993), known by his stage name Dizasta Vina, is a Tanzanian hip hop artist and record producer. He was born in Iringa Region, Tanzania and raised in Tabata, Dar es Salaam.

== Early life and education ==
Dizasta Vina was born Edger Vincent Mwaipeta on 17 February 1993 at Iringa Regional Referral Hospital, Tanzania. He is the second born in his family and the only son, with two older sisters. His family roots are in Mbeya Region, where he is of Nyakyusa heritage.

In 2003, his family relocated to Dar es Salaam, where he attended Jeshini Primary School in Ukonga and later Kimanga Primary School in Tabata, completing his primary education in 2006. He attended White Lake High School in Dar es Salaam before transferring to Southern Highlands Secondary School in Mbeya, where he completed his O-Level studies in 2010. He later completed his A-Level studies at Mbeya High School. In 2013, he enrolled at the Institute of Finance Management (IFM) in Dar es Salaam, pursuing a degree in accounting.

== Career ==
Dizasta Vina began his involvement in music in 2007, participating in various rap competitions, including the SM Straight Music Freestyle Battle in Iringa in 2010.

In 2011, he met producer Duke Touchez, who guided him toward Tamaduni Muzik. He earned his place at the label by competing in an open audition held during the simultaneous launch of five albums, being among only five artists selected out of more than twenty. He gained wider recognition in 2012 with his debut single "Harder".

In 2017, he released his debut mixtape "The Wonderboy Mixtape", which drew significant media attention and positioned him as one of the standout voices of his generation. On 14 February 2018, he appeared on East Africa Radio's Planet Bongo for the "Dakika 10 za Maangamizi" freestyle segment, which was reported as one of the most memorable episodes in the series.

== Controversies ==
In January 2023, a public dispute arose between Dizasta Vina and fellow artist Rapcha. The conflict began after Rapcha released "Story Nyingine" on 31 December 2022, which referenced several artists including Dizasta. On 9 January 2023, Dizasta responded with "Best Friend", followed by Rapcha's direct diss track "Nyuclear Story" on 12 January. Dizasta replied with "Tribulation" on 17 January 2023, after which Rapcha did not respond. In June 2023, Rapcha stated publicly that the two could not reconcile or work together.

== Discography ==
Year	Title	Type	Details
2017	The Wonderboy Mixtape	Mixtape	Debut Mixtape
2018	Jesusta	Album	Debut Album
2021	The Verteller	Album	Second Album
2024	A Father Figure	Album	Third Album
Singles	"Kikaoni"	Single	
Singles	"Ndoano"	Single	
Singles	"Kanisa"	Single	
Singles	"Fallen Angel"	Single	
Singles	"Wimbo usio bora"	Single	
	"Utaliimba Jina langu"	single	
