= Kasaloo Kyanga =

- Born: May 20, 1957; Kisangani, Democratic Republic of the Congo
- Died: September 9, 2011 (aged 54); Dar Es Salaam, Tanzania
- Citizenship: Tanzania
- Occupation(s): Musician, guitarist, composer
- Years active: 1980–2011
- Notable work: Karubandika, Masafa Marefu
- Style: Muziki wa dansi, Soukous
- Spouse: Jane Butinini
- Children: 4
- Relatives: Kyanga Songa
- Website: https://www.instagram.com/kasalookyanga/

Kasaloo Kyanga (May 20, 1957 – September 9, 2011) was a Congolese musician, guitarist, and composer. Kyanga's compositions, including the hit song "Masafa Marefu", composed with Tancut Almasi Orchestra, continue to be performed by musicians. His other hit songs include "Nimemkaribisha Nyoka", "Butinini", "Kashasha", and "Kambwembwe".

== Family ==
He and his twin brother, Kyanga Songa, were born on May 20, 1957.

== Career ==
Kyanga and Songa performed with the Tangut band. Attendees witnessed the Fimbo Lugoda and Kinyekinye Kisonzo Tisa Kumi Mangala styles. Kyanga, known for his metallic voice, arrived in Tanzania from the Democratic Republic of Congo (then Zaire) in 1980. Kyanga began working with the Orchestra Matimila Band, led by Remmy Ongala. Some of his best-known works include, "Almasi", "Bishada", "Natoa Onyo", and "Usia". Kyanga also collaborated with Congolese musician Skassy Kasambula.

Kyanga, Kasambula, and Semhando went to Tomatoma, and Kyanga composed "Mwanaidi". He later joined his brother Songa as a vocalist in Orchestra Marquis Original. Kyanga and Songa became more popular with compositions such as "Karubandika", "Sofia", "Clara", "Hasira Hasara", "Ni Wewe Pekee", and many others that won accolades globally. Kyanga and Songa later left Orchestra Marquis and worked with the Tancut Almasi Orchestra in Iringa. Additional hits including, "Masafa Marefu", "Pili Wangu", "Tutasele", "Kiwele", and "Jane Butinini" (Kyanga's wife), further increased their popularity.

Butinini, who used to be a netball star, happened to be the sister of Duncan Butini, a former member of the Railways Football team from Morogoro.

== Death ==
Kyanga's death was announced in the early morning of September 9, 2011. He died from a pleural effusion. Veteran musician Kikumbi Mwanza Mpango Mwema, popularly known as King Kiki, confirmed Kyanga's death.

== Discography ==
- Mchezo Umekwisha
- Karubandika
- Masafa Marefu
