= Hukwe Zawose =

Tanzanian musician

- Birth name: Hukwe Ubi Zawose
- Born: c. 1935; Dodoma, Tanzania
- Died: December 30, 2003; Bagamoyo, Tanzania
- Occupation: Musician
- Years active: 1970s–2003
- Labels: Real World Records

Hukwe Ubi Zawose (born 1938 or 1940; died December 30, 2003) was a prominent Tanzanian musician. He was a member of the Gogo ethnic group and played the ilimba, a large lamellophone similar to the mbira, as well as several other traditional instruments. He was also a highly regarded singer.

He came to national and international attention after Julius Nyerere invited him to live and work in Dar es Salaam. He also gained attention for his work with Peter Gabriel, and released two albums (Chibite and Assembly) on Gabriel's Real World Records label. His final release before his death, Assembly, was a collaborative effort with producer/guitarist Michael Brook. At the 2005 Tanzania Music Awards he was given the Hall of Fame Award. His family is included in the 2009 documentary Throw Down Your Heart, which follows American banjo player Béla Fleck as he journeys through Africa.

Zawose's daughter Pendo and granddaughter Leah perform together as The Zawose Queens.

== Discography ==
- 1985 - Tanzania Yetu – Hukwe Zawose & Bagamoyo (Triple Earth Records)
- 1987 - Mateso - Master Musicians of Tanzania – Hukwe Zawose, Dickson Mkwama & Lubeleje Chiute (Triple Earth Records)
- 1994 - Tanzania: The Art of Hukwe Ubi Zawose (Jvc/Sire)
- 1996 - Chibite (Real World Records)
- 2000 - Mkuki Wa Rocho (A Spear To The Soul) (Real World Records)
- 2002 - Assembly (Real World Records)

== See also ==
- Ilimba
- Music of Tanzania
