= Muziki wa dansi =

Music genre in Tanzania

Muziki wa Dansi
- Stylistic origins: Soukous; Congolese Rhumba; African popular music
- Cultural origins: Late 1930s
- Typical instruments: Guitar (esp. fingerstyle); bass (esp. acoustic); drums; brass; vocals
- Derivative forms: Soukous; Ndombolo

Fusion genres
- Benga; Makossa; Kwassa kwassa

Local scenes
- Tanzania • Zanzibar

Other topics
- Taarab; Ngoma music; Afro (genre); Son Cubano

Muziki wa dansi (in Swahili: "dance music"), or simply dansi, is a Tanzanian music genre, derivative of Congolese soukous and Congolese rumba. It is sometimes called Swahili jazz because most dansi lyrics are in Swahili, and "jazz" is an umbrella term used in Central and Eastern Africa to refer to soukous, highlife, and other dance music and big band genres. Muziki wa dansi can also be referred to as Tanzanian rumba, as "african rumba" is another name for soukous.

Muziki wa dansi began in the 1930s in the Dar es Salaam area (where most dansi bands come from), and it is still popular in Tanzania, although new generations are more likely to listen to bongo flava or other forms of pop music. Notable dansi bands include DDC Mlimani Park, International Orchestra Safari Sound, Juwata Jazz, Maquis Original, Super Matimila, and Vijana Jazz.

== History ==
In the first decades of the 20th century, soukous bands from Belgian Congo and French Congo were getting very popular across Eastern Africa. This craze brought along dance clubs, especially in major cities like Nairobi and Dar es Salaam, where bands would play live 7 days a week. While some of these bands were actually from Zaire, local bands emerged in Kenya, Tanzania and elsewhere and began to develop their own blend of soukous. In Dar, some of the bands that pioneered the "tanzanian rumba" were Dar es Salaam Jazz Band (founded in 1932), Morogoro Jazz and Tabora Jazz. These early bands were typically big bands based on brass and drums.

After Tanzania became independent (in 1961), a sponsorship system was introduced by Julius Nyerere's government, whereby bands would be financially supported by government departments or other national institutions. One of the major dansi bands of this era was the NUTA Jazz Band, which was named after its sponsor, the National Union of Tanzania. At the same time, bands gradually came to be managed like profit companies; the band owned the instruments, and musicians were employees, either on wage or salary. NUTA Jazz Band was one of the first bands to adopt this model; soon many others followed, including notable bands such as Orchestra Maquis Original, DDC Mlimani Park Orchestra, Tancut Alimasi and Vijana Jazz. As a consequence of this, the most talented musicians would typically switch back and forth between bands to the best offerer, until they had gathered enough money to start their own band. Composers like Muhiddin Maalin and Hassani Bitchuka wrote hit songs for virtually all the major bands of their times. Conversely, a band was more of a "brand" than any specific ensemble of musicians; some bands kept playing for up to 50 years, while their members came and went.

Dansi music flourished through the 1960s, 1970s and 1980s, with bands such as Orchestra Safari Sound, Orchestra Maquis Original, International Orchestra Safari Sound and DDC Mlimani Park Orchestra battling to get the audience's favours. Competition was in fact a relevant concept in the development of dansi. Music festivals were usually in the form of contests, and each band typically had its own fan base, much in the venue of sporting teams. Also, a band often had its "nemesis", i.e., their foremost competitor; for example, the dansi scene in the 1970s was characterized by the rivalry between Orchestra Maquis Original and Orchestra Safari Sound, which was later replaced by that between International Orchestra Safari Sound and Mlimani Park.

Mitindo (in Swahili, "styles") were a key element in the rivalry between dansi bands. Each band would typically create its own style (mtindo), which was designed to be catchy for the audience and be clearly distinctive of the band. Mitindo were usually associated with, and often named after, some specific dancing style; for example, the name of Orchestra Maquis' mtindo ogelea piga mbizi means "dive and swim", as dancers were supposed to move their arms like they were diving. Bands often changed their mtindo when it began to go out of style. Some musicians and composers were specifically renowned as "mtindo makers".

Mitindo were also important to identify a band irrespective of who was actually playing in that band. When a musician switched from one band to another, he would change his style to reflect the new band's mtindo. Again, the most appreciated dansi musicians could easily change their style as needed.

Over time, dansi music changed, partly influenced by the evolution of European and American music. Bands in the 1960s and 1970s typically had electric guitars and electric bass guitars; in the 1980s keyboards became commonplace, and later bands even used synthesizers and drum machines (as was the case with Vijana Jazz). The sound of most recent dansi bands like Gari Kubwa, Tokyo Ngma and Atomic Advantage is actually keyboard-based.

== Notable bands ==
Name	Also known as	Timeline	Location	Mitindo	Notable musicians
Dar es Salaam Jazz Band	Dar Jazz	1930s-1970s	Dar es Salaam		Michael Enoch
Morogoro Jazz Band			Morogoro		Mbaraka Mwinshehe, Salim Adballah
NUTA Jazz Band	Juwata Jazz Band, OTTU Jazz Band	1960s-present			Joseph Lusungu, Mnenge Ramadhani, Muhiddin Maalim, Hassani Bitchuka, Saidi Mabera, Abel Balthazar
Orchestra Maquis Original		1970s-present	Dar es Salaam	kamanyola, zembwela	Chinyama Chianza, Nguza Mbangu, Dekula Kahanga, Kasaloo Kyanga, Kyanga Songa, Tshimanga Assosa
Orchestra Safari Sound		1970s-1985			Ndala Kasheba, Skassy Kasambula, Kalala Mbwembwe, Molai Tungwa, Kababa Nkomba Gabi, Sony Mobali, Twahir Mohd, Muhidin Maalim
Mlimani Park Orchestra		1978-?		sikinde	Muhiddin Maalim, Hassani Bitchuka, Abel Balthazar, Michael Enoch, Cosmas Chidumule, Shaaban Dede
Vijana Jazz		1980s-1990s		Pamba moto	Hemedi Maneti, Cosmas Chidumule, Mhina Panduka, Jerry Nashon, Hamza Kalala, Yohana Shaban, Gotagota, Rashid Pembe, Hasan Dalali
International Orchestra Safari Sound	IOSS	1985-?		ndekule	Muhiddin Maalim, Hassani Bitchuka, Abel Balthazar, Nguza Mbangu

== See also ==
- Music of Tanzania
- Tanzania Music Awards
