= Ngoma music =

Music genre in East and South Africa

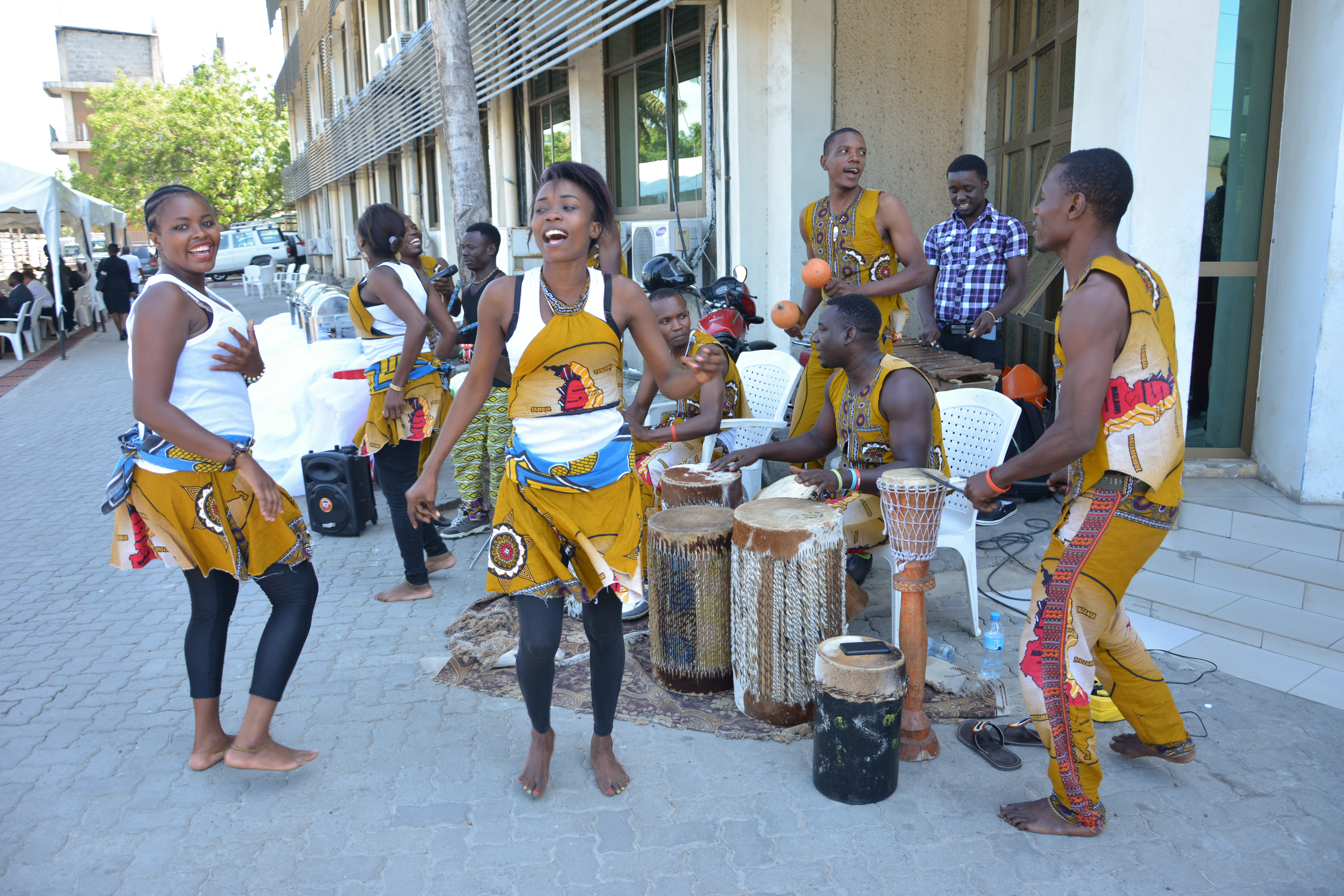
Tanzanian Ngoma group

Ngoma (also ng'oma or ing'oma) is a Swahili term with many connotations that encompasse music, dance, and instruments. In Tanzania ngoma also refers to events, both life-changing events such as the first menstruation, the birth or passing of a loved one, as well as events such as celebrations, rituals, or competitions. In traditional societies, Ngoma was the primary form of music and dance throughout the Great Lakes and Southern Africa. Today it is a musical genre in Tanzania, deemed an official musical form by the National Arts Council (BASATA - Baraza la Sanaa la Taifa). In Tanzania, it is common throughout the country, performed, taught, and studied in schools and universities. The national academy for ngoma is the Bagamoyo Arts and Cultural Institute, which has produced many ngoma musicians and dancers.

Traditional forms of ngoma dancing consist of prominent movements of the hips. The musical compositions use a variety of instruments, including traditional string instruments and horns, but most prominently the use of drums. In some other local traditions, no instruments are used, such as in the Ambrokoi dance of the Maasai or the Ligihu of the Ngoni. These are usually dances with jumping and stomping, with rhythmic movement and often a more competitive aspect than those dances with instruments.

== History ==
Before colonization, ngoma was the dominant form of culture throughout the Great Lakes. One of the primary functions of ngoma was as an interaction between elders and youth. This served primarily as a means to teach the youth, and learn about the youth so as to know how to guide them better in life. During colonization, ngoma was outlawed as colonial administrations viewed it as unchristian and holding back the civilization process. Tanzanians created a new form of ngoma called mganda in the hope that it would appeal to the colonial administrators. Mganda ngoma adopted the costumes of western military uniforms and dress. It also adopted some of the military instruments. This would eventually become a form of big band music. Eventually, the first clubs opened in Dar es Salaam and Tanga for these mganda ngoma bands to perform. Their music began to be played on the radio and recorded in studios. Mganda ngoma music exploded in popularity and has become known as dansi (dance jazz) today. After independence, the government of Tanzania (TANU) placed a very strong emphasis on returning to traditional ngoma.

"When we were at school we were taught to sing the songs of the Europeans. How many of us were taught the songs of the Wanyamwezi or of the Wahehe? Many of us have learnt to dance the ‘‘rumba’’ or the ‘‘chachacha’’ to ‘‘rock’n’roll’’ and to ‘‘twist.’’...But how many of us can dance, or have even heard of, the Gombe Sugu, the Mangala, the Konge, Nyang’umumi, Kiduo or Lele Mama? ... And even though we dance and play the piano, how often does that dancing ...really give us the sort of thrill we get from dancing the mganda or the gombe sugu even though the music may be no more than the shaking of pebbles in a tin? It is hard for any man to get much real excitement from dances and music which are not in his own blood."

— President Nyerere, Tanganyika Inaugural Address, 10 December 1962

While this was somewhat successful, TANU was never able to fully achieve the goals set out by Nyerere's inaugural address. Mwasaburi Ali was also part of the Ngoma and Taraab dance groups within TANU and highlighted the importance of them in mobilizing women’s support and raising money for TANU. Even TANU still used dansi and kwaya as primary tools for education, national and political purposes. TANU was successful in promoting arts in general, including establishing centers for art education. It also allowed the tribes to return to practicing ngoma freely, which most had been doing in the dark throughout colonization. Following the economic reforms of 1985, ngoma has changed its societal role in national and tribal life. While still very popular, it is rarely taught by elders to the youths as was its traditional role in the past. Nonetheless ngoma is still very popular and widespread today. Ngoma troupes have turned to modernizing and commercializing the music and dance, to compete commercially. One dance may include aspects of as great a variety of tribal and geographic ranges as possible to appeal to as broad an audience as possible, particularly elders, while also using many inspirations from other genres such as dansi or bongo flava to appeal to the youths. Additionally ngoma has modernized its use of instruments. Many traditional instruments are no longer available or possible to make. Today modern manufactured instruments and gear, such as guitars, keyboards, microphones, and amplifiers are usually used.
