= Orchestra Safari Sound =

Orchestra Safari Sound (OSS) was a major Tanzanian muziki wa dansi band in the 1970s. Along with Orchestra Maquis Original, OSS contributed to the evolution of dansi, introducing a slower-paced and more melodic style that further differentiated dansi from its ancestor genre, the Congolese soukous. The band was led by Ndala Kasheba, one of the most popular musicians in Tanzanian pop music.

As a difference with respect to most dansi bands, that were mostly managed by government institutions, OSS was the property of an entrepreneur, Hugo Kisima. In 1985, Kisima disbanded OSS to found another successful ensemble, International Orchestra Safari Sound (IOSS).
