= Dar es Salaam Jazz Band =

Tanzanian band

The Dar es Salaam Jazz Band (also nicknamed Dar Jazz) was a Tanzanian big band from Dar es Salaam, established in 1932, that was one of the prominent muziki wa dansi bands between the 1960s and 1970s.

During the 1960s the band, led by Michael Enoch, was known to have a following who would regularly attend their live performances; this loyalty has been likened to that of football fans. Songs played by the Dar es Salaam Jazz Band would often include a solo by one band member, that would result in the crowds dancing becoming "crazy" and "uninhibited". Although Enoch did originally play guitar in the band's first years, he went on to be known mostly as a saxophone and trumpet player, and would later play in many other major dansi bands.

== See also ==
- Music of Tanzania
- Cuban Marimba Band
- Dada Kidawa - Sister Kidawa (Swahili)
