= Ilimba =

Lamellophone from Tanzania

The ilimba is a lamellophone from Tanzania. It is a traditional instrument of the Gogo ethnic group and its most famous player in the 20th century was Hukwe Zawose, who developed a version of the instrument with between 66 and 72 metal keys.

The instrument is similar to the Zimbabwean mbira but larger, and is tuned to intervals derived from the overtone series.

== See also ==
- Lamellophone
- Mbira
- Music of Tanzania
- Hukwe Zawose
- Kalimba
