= Tabora Jazz =

Music band based in Tabora Region

Tabora Sound Band, formerly known as Tabora Jazz, is a seminal Tanzanian muziki wa dansi band based in Tabora, Tanzania and led by guitarist Shem Ibrahim Karenga. In the 1970s, their song Dada Asha was a major hit in Tanzania and East Africa. They disbanded in the late 1970s but efforts were made to revive the band. So, by early 1980s, it was active again but disbanded in mid 1980s following damage of the instruments by an electric shock. It was later reformed by Shem Karenga as Tabora Jazz Stars. Kassimu Kaluwona, the rythim guitarist of the former band also joined. The band was based in Dar es Salaam.They mainly played classic songs of the former band, Tabora Jazz Band.

Tabora Jazz Band is believed to have influenced the Congolese music. The fast-paced guitar playing of Shem Karenga and Kassimu Kaluwona, manifested in the famous song Dada Asha No 2, was adopted by many Congolese guitarists to create a new musical style, Kwasa Kwasa. Among others, Lokassa ya Mbongo adopted the musical style. The Soukous wave of the late 1980s and early 1990s originated from Tabora Jazz Band and other Tanzanian musical bands such as Super Volcano, Western Jazz Band and Nyanyembe Jazz Band. The bass guitar playing style of Salumu Luzira in the song Dada Asha No.2 has been adopted by many Congolese bassists. The bass style played by Shaba Kahamba in the song 'Ngalula' in the album Soukous Vibration Vol. 1 is a good example of this adoption. Unfortunately, little has been documented on Tanzania's contribution to the development of soukous!
