= Sauti za Busara =

Festival for popular African music in Zanzibar

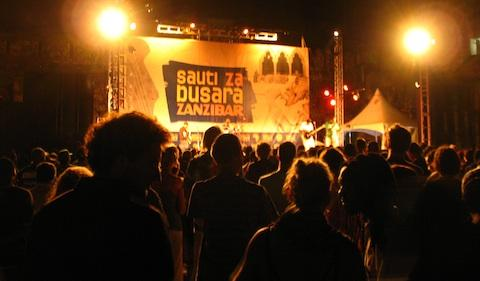
2012 edition of the Festival.

Sauti za Busara (in Swahili: "Sounds of Wisdom") is an African music festival, held every year in February in Zanzibar, Tanzania. It is centred in the Old Fort (Ngome Kongwe), with fringe events taking place at the same time around Stone Town - including a carnival street parade (Beni).

Sauti za Busara has become one of the largest music festivals in East Africa, with several hundreds of artists participating each year. Musicians who have played there include Taarab artists Bi Kidude and Culture Musical Club, to local Tanzanian pop and hip-hop.

The twelfth edition of the festival took place in 2015. However, the organisers have since announced their decision to cancel the 2016 edition due to shortage of funding. Despite the world-wide pandemic caused by COVID-19, the festival took place in February 2021.

== See also ==
- Music of Tanzania
- Taarab
