= Vijana Jazz =

Tanzanian band

Vijana Jazz Orchestra (also known as Vijana Jazz Band or simply Vijana Jazz) is a Tanzanian muziki wa dansi band that reached its peak of popularity in the 1980s. As with many other dansi bands of the times, it was sponsored by a government institution, namely the Umoja wa Vijana, i.e., the youth wing of Tanzania's ruling party Tanganyika African National Union (TANU) (renamed Chama cha Mapinduzi in 1977).

== History ==
The band was founded in 1971 by John Ondoro Chacha. In 1978, the Tanzanian government passed a law that allowed bands to purchase foreign instruments (something that had previously been forbidden by the Baraza la Muziki la Taifa, a governative council responsible for the regulation of the music business). Vijana Jazz was one of the first bands to take on this opportunity, and in the 1980s it became extremely popular because of its innovative sound that made use of synthesizers and drum machines.

Popular mitindo (styles) created by Vijana Jazz include sindimba, heka heka, koka koka, watoto wa nyumbani and pamba moto. Some of the most notable musicians that have played in Vijana Jazz are Hamza Kalala, Hemedi Maneti, Issa Chikupele and Manitu Musa.

The band declined in popularity in the early 1990s, partly as a consequence of its leader's sudden death (in 1990).

== Partial discography ==
Note: Vijana Jazz records were published by a variety of labels, including at least Africa79, Ahadi, Ken-Tanza, Moto Moto, and Polydor.

- Mary Maria (1986)
- Moto
- Mundinde
- Hayati Hemed Maneti and Vijana Jazz, Makumbusho
- Best of Vijana Jazz vol. 1
- Best of Vijana Jazz vol. 2
- Best of Vijana Jazz vol. 3
- Best of Vijana Jazz vol. 4
- Hayati Maneti Last Recording

Several muziki wa dansi collections include songs by Vijana Jazz. Some examples are:

- Swahili Hits, 1985
- Swahili Hits vol. 3
- Swahili Hits vol. 4
- Tanzania Hit Parade
- Tanzania Hit Parade vol. 2
- Tanzania Hit Parade vol. 3
- Tanzania Hit Parade 1988
- The Rough Guide to the Music of Tanzania
