= Orchestra Maquis Original =

Tanzanian muziki wa dansi band

- Origin: Lubumbashi
- Genres: Muziki Wa Dansi
- Past members: Kasaloo Kyanga, Nguza Mbangu, Thsimanga Assosa, Ilunga Mbanza

Orchestra Maquis Original is a Tanzanian muziki wa dansi band, originally from DR Congo. Founded in 1970 and still active, it is one of the most long-lived dansi bands.

== History ==
The band was founded in 1970 in Lubumbashi (then Zaire, now DR Congo) by a group of musicians from soukous band "Super Teo". In 1972, they were invited to play in Kampala, Uganda, and on the way there performed a few gigs in Tanzania. This experience triggered their decision to relocate to Kinondoni, a district of Dar es Salaam.

As most Tanzanian bands of the time, Orchestra Maquis Original was sponsored by the Tanzanian government and, from a commercial point of view, was managed as a cooperative; the cooperative actually had other businesses besides music (e.g., it owned a farm). The leader of the band was also president of the cooperative. The first leader/president of Orchestra Maquis was saxophonist Chinyama Chianza, who served in both roles until his death in 1985.

In the 1970s the band became very popular with its mtindo (style) kamanyola bila jasho, which roughly translates to "dance kamanyola without sweating".

The next leader after Chianza's death was guitarist Nguza Mbangu, who was famous for his soloing technique (two of his most appreciated solos are those in songs Mpenzi Luta and Mabruki). In 1987, Mbangu left Orchestra Maquis to get involved with several other projects (he would later create another notable dansi band, Orchestra Safari Sound). The new leader of the band was singer Mbuya Makonga. Subsequent leaders of Maquis include Thsimanga Assosa and Ilunga Mbanza. Assosa wrote some of the most recent hit songs of Maquis, such as Makumbele and Ngalula; those songs also showcased guitarist Dekula Kahanga's talent. Kahanga would later become a successful guitarist on his own; he has now relocated in Sweden.

Over time, Orchestra Maquis has explored a number of mitindo (styles). Besides kamanyola, some of the most popular mitindo by Maquis were sanifu, ogelea piga mbizi (literally: "swim and dive") and zembwela.
