= Msondo Ngoma =

Tanzanian muziki wa dansi band

Msondo Ngoma (formerly known as NUTA Jazz Band, renamed Juwata Jazz Band, and then OTTU Jazz Band) is a Tanzanian muziki wa dansi band. Having been established in 1964, it is the oldest active dansi band in Tanzania.

== History ==
The band began in 1964 and was originally named "NUTA Jazz Band", after its sponsor, the National Union of Tanganyika (NUTA), which was the main Tanzanian trade union. In the early years of dansi, the NUTA Jazz Band was very influential both artistically and in terms of financial organization; namely, it was one of the first dansi bands to constitute itself into a "cooperative" of salaried musicians (a model that would become widespread in the 1970s).

In the 1960s, NUTA Jazz Band was led by trumpeter-singer Joseph Lusungu and saxophonist Mnenge Ramadhani, who defined the brass-centered sound of the band.

NUTA Jazz Band held its position as one of the major Tanzanian dansi bands throughout the latter half of the 1960s and most of the 1970s. In 1977 it experienced a major change in personnel, with many of its most talented musicians (including Muhiddin Maalim and Hassani Bitchuka) leaving the band to form a new ensemble, Mlimani Park Orchestra. In 1977, the band changed its name to "Juwata Jazz", after the Swahili name of its sponsor (NUTA), Jumuiya ya Wafanyakazi Tanzania. About at the same time, guitarist Saidi Mabera became the new leader of the band. He wrote several of Juwata's hit songs of the 1980s. After Mabera, both Maalim and Bitchuka (who rejoined the band in 1991) became leaders. Maalim is credited with one of the major hits of Juwata in the 1990s, Usia kwa watoto.

The band changed its name again in 1991 from Juwata Jazz to OTTU Jazz, when the trade union that sponsored it was renamed Organization of Tanzanian Trade Unions. The band is still active as "Msondo Ngoma" (msondo being a Swahili drum), performing regularly at the TCC Club in Temeke for example, and is the oldest active dansi band in Tanzania. This is reflected by its motto baba ya muziki, "father of music".

== Literature ==
- Alex Perullo (2011). Live from Dar Es Salaam: Popular Music and Tanzania's Music Economy. Indiana University Press. ISBN 978-0253222923.
