= 4th Kalasha International Film & TV Awards =

2012 film award ceremony

4th Kalasha Film and Television Awards
- Date: 8 December 2012
- Site: KICC, Nairobi, Kenya
- Organized by: Kenya Film Commission

Highlights
- Best Picture: Nairobi Half Life
- Best Actor: Joseph Wairimu (Film); Hiram Muigai (TV)
- Best Actress: Rita Dominic (Film); Florence Nduta (TV)
- Most awards: Nairobi Half Life / Simiyu Samurai (5)
- Most nominations: Shattered (8)

The 4th Kalasha Film and Television Awards ceremony, presented by the Kenya Film Commission, honoured the best in Kenyan television and film for the year 2012. It took place on 8 December 2012 in Nairobi, Kenya.

== Winners and nominees ==
Winners are listed first, highlighted in boldface and are indicated by ‡.

=== Film ===
Table featuring winners and nominees of the 4th Kalasha Awards (Film Categories)
**Best Feature Film**: **Nairobi Half Life** ‡; Lost In Africa; Shattered; Senior Pastor	**Best Short Film**: **Simiyu Samurai** ‡; Miss Nobody; The Victim
**Best Documentary**: **Tumanka Goes To School** ‡	**Best Director**: **Tosh Gitonga – Nairobi Half Life** ‡; Gilbert Lukalia – Shattered; Robbie Bresson – Simiyu Samurai
**Best Cinematography**: **Nairobi Half Life** ‡; Simiyu Samurai; Lost In Africa; Shattered	**Best Scriptwriter in Original Screenplay**: **Nairobi Half Life** ‡; Shattered; Lost In Africa
**Best Sound**: **Simiyu Samurai** ‡; Shattered; Senior Pastor	**Best Original Score**: **Guardians of the Wild** ‡; Tumanka Goes To School; Challenging and Healing Hidden War Crimes
**Best Editing**: **Simiyu Samurai** ‡; Nairobi Half Life; Lost In Africa	**Best Lead Actor in a film**: **Joseph K. Wairimu – Nairobi Half Life** ‡; Amos Odhiambo – Lost In Africa; Kang’ethe Mungai – Senior Pastor; Sam Kihiu – Valentine Ya Njaramba
**Best Lead Actress in a film**: **Rita Dominic – Shattered** ‡; Patricia Kihoro – Miss Nobody; Joan Amara – Miss Pathetic	**Best Supporting Actor in a Film**: **David Ng’ang’a Ndugi – Torn Veil** ‡; Allan Adika – Shattered; Olwenya Maina – Nairobi Half Life
**Best Supporting Actress in a film**: **Eclay Wangira – Simiyu Samurai** ‡; Irene Kayeri – Lost In Africa; Mumbi Maina – Shattered	

=== Television ===
Table featuring winners and nominees of the 4th Kalasha Awards (TV Categories)
**Best TV Drama**: **Lies That Bind** ‡; Higher Learning; Mali	**Best TV Comedy**: **The Pasua Show** ‡; Vioja Mahakamani; LOL
**Best Entertainment Programme**: **99 Degrees** ‡; Get Lifted	**Best TV Talk Show**: **Agenda Kenya** ‡
**Best Lead Actor in a TV Drama**: **Hiram Muigai – Vioja Mahakamani** ‡; Rogers Otieno – Higher Learning; Kevin Mbugua – Mali	**Best Lead Actress in a TV Drama**: **Florence Nduta – Lies That Bind** ‡; Lucy Nyaga – Lies That Bind; Mkamzee Mwatela – Mali; Janet Kirina – Higher Learning
**Best Supporting Actor in a TV Drama**: **Justin Mirichii – Lies That Bind** ‡; Moses Macharia – Mali; Elsaphan Njora – Briefcase Inc.	**Best Supporting Actress in a TV Drama**: **Eunice Wambui – Vitimbi** ‡; Mumbi Maina – Mali; Caroline Kipsuto – Mheshimiwa
**Best Performance in a Comedy**: **Peter Sankale – Vioja Mahakamani** ‡; Alex Njuguna – The Pasua Show

=== Special awards ===
Table featuring winners and nominees of the 4th Kalasha Awards (Special Categories)
**Best Student Film**: **Ganagri** ‡	**Best Student Documentary**: **The Cut** ‡
**Best Animation**: **Wageuzi Battle 2012** ‡	**Best Diaspora**: **Look Again** ‡
**Kituo Halisi Award**: **KBC** ‡	**Watershed Compliant Station**: **K24** ‡
**Lifetime Achievement Award**: **Jane Munene** ‡
