= ETU =

Etu is a form of boxing practiced in Flores, Indonesia.

Etu or ETU may also refer to:

== People ==
- Etu Molden (born 1979), American football player
- Etu Uaisele (born 1984), Tongan rugby league footballer

== Universities ==
- Eckernforde Tanga University, in Tanzania
- Erzurum Technical University, in Turkey
- Saint Petersburg Electrotechnical University, in Russia
- TOBB University of Economics and Technology, in Ankara, Turkey

== Other uses ==
- Energy transfer upconversion
- Electrical Trades Union (disambiguation)
- Ethylene thiourea, a fungicide and pesticide
- European Taekwondo Union
- European Triathlon Union
- Jagham language

== See also ==
- E tū, a New Zealand trade union
