= Yosepher Komba =

Tanzanian Member of Parliament

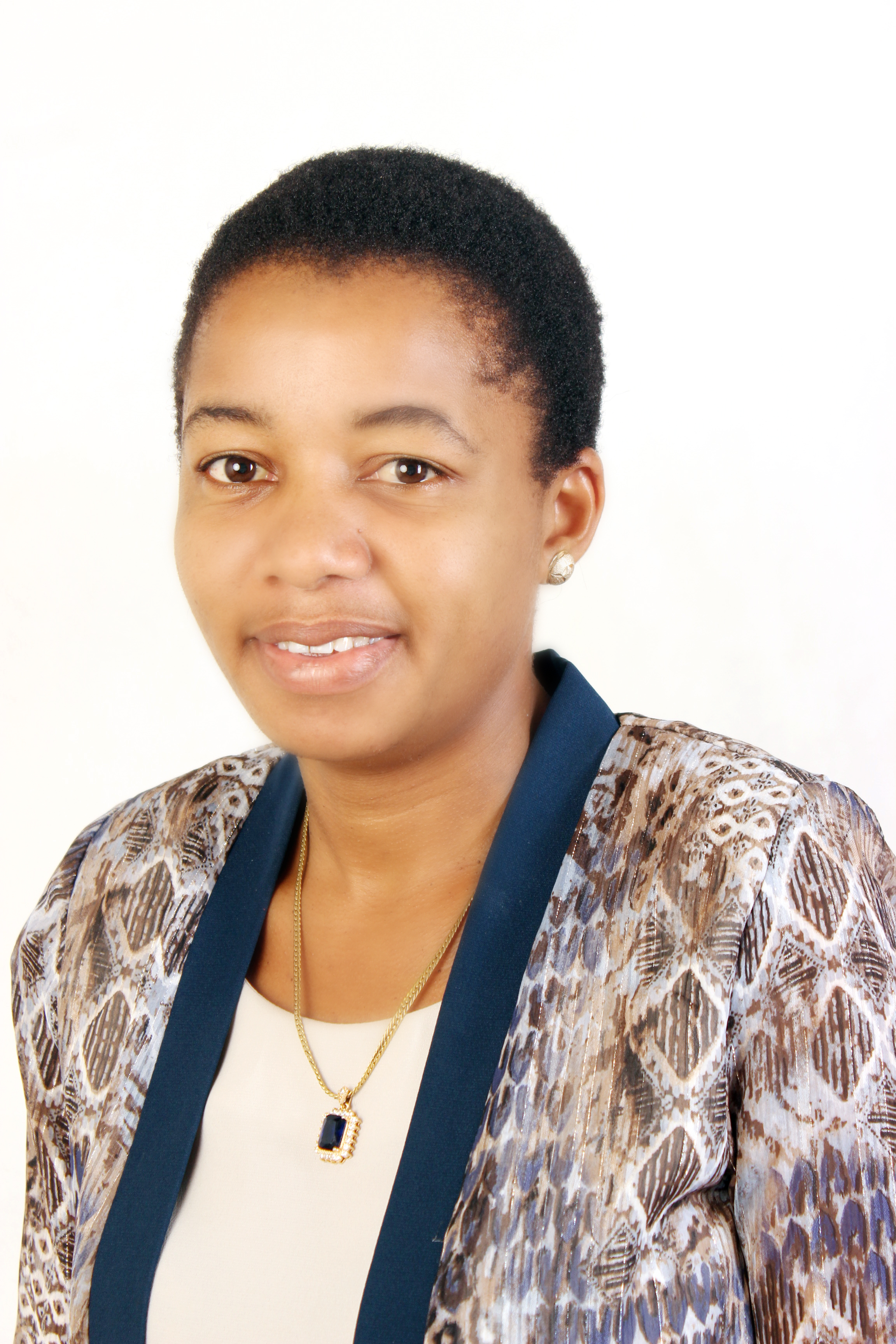

Member of the National Assembly of Tanzania
- In office 2015–2020
- Succeeded by: Mwana FA
- Constituency: Muheza

Personal details
- Born: 23 March 1986 (age 40)
- Party: Chadema
- Website: www.instagram.com/yosepherkomba

Yosepher Komba is a former Member of Parliament in the Tanzanian National Assembly who held a Special Seat. She is a member of the Chadema party and represented the Muheza constituency.

== Biography ==
From 2008 to 2009, Komba taught at the National Muslim Council of Tanzania in Dar es Salaam. From 2012 to 2013, she was an assistant professor at Eckernforde University in Tanga.

Komba's political career began in 2012, when she served as the chairperson of a Women's wing at the ward level. The next year (2013) she served as a Ward Secretary, and in 2014 she returned to serving as chairperson of a Women's wing, but this time on a district level.

In 2015, Komba was elected to the National Assembly of Tanzania in the Chadema as a representative of the Muheza constituency. During the first three years of her term, she was a member of the Public Accounts Committee. In her capacity as an MP, she advocated for the government to provide sanitary towels to girls in primary schools.

In December 2020, Komba was defeated in the general elections by hip hop artist Hamis Mwinjama, known as Mwana FA. She received 12,034 votes while her opponent received 47,578. As a result, Komba's party which comes from the opposition group, claimed that the election was rigged.
