= Patricia Kihoro =

Kenyan singer-songwriter (born 1986)

- Born: Patricia Wangechi Kihoro; 4 January 1986 (age 40); Nairobi, Kenya
- Education: Moi University
- Occupations: Singer-songwriter; actress; radio presenter
- Years active: 2004–present
- Musical career
- Genres: R&B; pop; soul; neo soul
- Website: www.patriciakihoro.com

Patricia Wangechi Kìhoro (born 4 January 1986) is a Kenyan singer, songwriter, actress, radio and reality television personality. She rose into prominence after she participated in the third season of Tusker Project Fame, where she became one of the finalists. In acting, she has appeared in a number of local productions like the 2011 film Miss Nobody, which saw her being nominated in the 2012 Kalasha Awards for best lead actress in a film. In television production, she has been cast as a lead in Groove Theory, a musical drama and as a regular in Demigods, Changes, Rush and Makutano Junction. As a radio presenter, she has worked with One FM and Homeboyz FM. Patricia is a content creator, influencer and YouTuber.

== Early life ==
Kìhoro, born in January 1986 and raised in Kenya's capital Nairobi, attended Shepherd's Junior Primary School for her primary school and later moved on to Moi Girls' High School, Nairobi. After her O levels, she enrolled in Moi University in the school of science and psychology. While at Moi University, she opted to audition for the third season of Tusker Project Fame. Patricia is a YouTuber who shares her real life experiences of travel adventures and make-up routines.

== Career ==
=== 2009–12 ===
In March 2009, Kìhoro auditioned for the reality singing competition Tusker Project Fame . In 2010 she was featured in the music video for Just a Band's song Ha-he that focused on the hero Makmende and attracted global attention. In 2011 she played Pet Nanjala in drama series Changes. The same year she played the leading role in the film, Miss Nobody that led her to be nominated at the 2011 Kalasha Awards for the "Lead Actress in Film" category. In the 2012, she was cast as one of the leads in musical drama Groove Theory. She portrayed Biscuit, Zamm's (portrayed by Kevin Maina) love interest, in a story that revolved around the lives of five students at the fictional Victoria University.

=== 2013–14 ===
In 2013 she appeared in reality show The Fattening Room, that led her fellow cast members and she to explore the customs and traditions of Efik people in south-east Nigeria. In 2014, she was cast as Nana, a 28-year-old editor in the series, Rush. She played alongside Janet Mbugua, Wendy Kimani, Wendy Sankale and Maryanne Nundo.

=== 2015–present ===
In 2015, Kìhoro was cast as Maqbul Mohammed's daughter in series, Makutano Junction. In 2018 Kìhoro played the role of Josephine, the new young bride of one of the main characters' father, in the critically acclaimed and controversial film Rafiki. She is also a radio host. In 2018 Patricia played the role of Judy in 'Disconnect' a Kenyan romantic comedy directed by Tosh Gitonga. In 2023 she reprised her role as Judy in the sequel 'Disconnect: The Wedding Planner' which got its international release on Netflix.

In 2021, Patricia cameoed in Showmax's Crime and Justice TV series in which she played the role of Tina, in the episode, "Battered". The main theme illustrated through her character is that of a victim of domestic violence.

Patricia Kìhoro appeared in a new Showmax adult series, 4Play, that premiered in mid November 2024 as a supporting cast.

== Discography ==
Year	Single(s)	Director	Album	Ref(s)
2011	"Nakupenda"		TBA	
2013	"Loving Wrong" (Calvo Mistari featuring Patricia Kihoro)	Edu G	TBA	

== Filmography ==
=== Films and television ===
Year	Title	Role	Notes
2009	Tusker Project Fame	Herself	Contestant; finalist
2011	Miss Nobody	Juliette	Short film
2011	Changes	Petronilla Nanjala	
2011–13	Demigods	Mona	
2012	Mali	Herself	1 episode
2012	Out of Africa – A Safari Through Magical Kenya	Herself	Reality show
2012–14	Groove Theory	Biscuit	Series regular
2013	Homecoming	Alina	Short film
2013	Life in a Single Lane	Herself	
2013	The Fattening Room	Herself	
2014	There is Nothing to Do in Nairobi	Patience Omondi	Short film
2014	Rush	Nana	
2015–present	Makutano Junction	Mabuki	Series regular
2018	Thomas and Friends Big World! Big Adventures!	Nia (singing voice)	Film
2018	Disconnect	Judy	Romantic comedy
2018	Rafiki	Josephine	Film
2021	Crime And Justice	Tina	
2022	Disconnect: The wedding Planner	Judy	Romantic Comedy
2024	4 Play	Candy	Crime drama

== Awards and nominations ==
Year	Association	Award category	Nominated work	Result	Ref(s)
2012	Kalasha Awards	Best Lead Actress in a Film	Miss Nobody	Nominated	
2020	Nickelodeon Kid's Choice Awards	Favorite African Star	annual American children's awards ceremony	Nominated	
