= Alpha Rwirangira =

Rwandan singer-songwriter

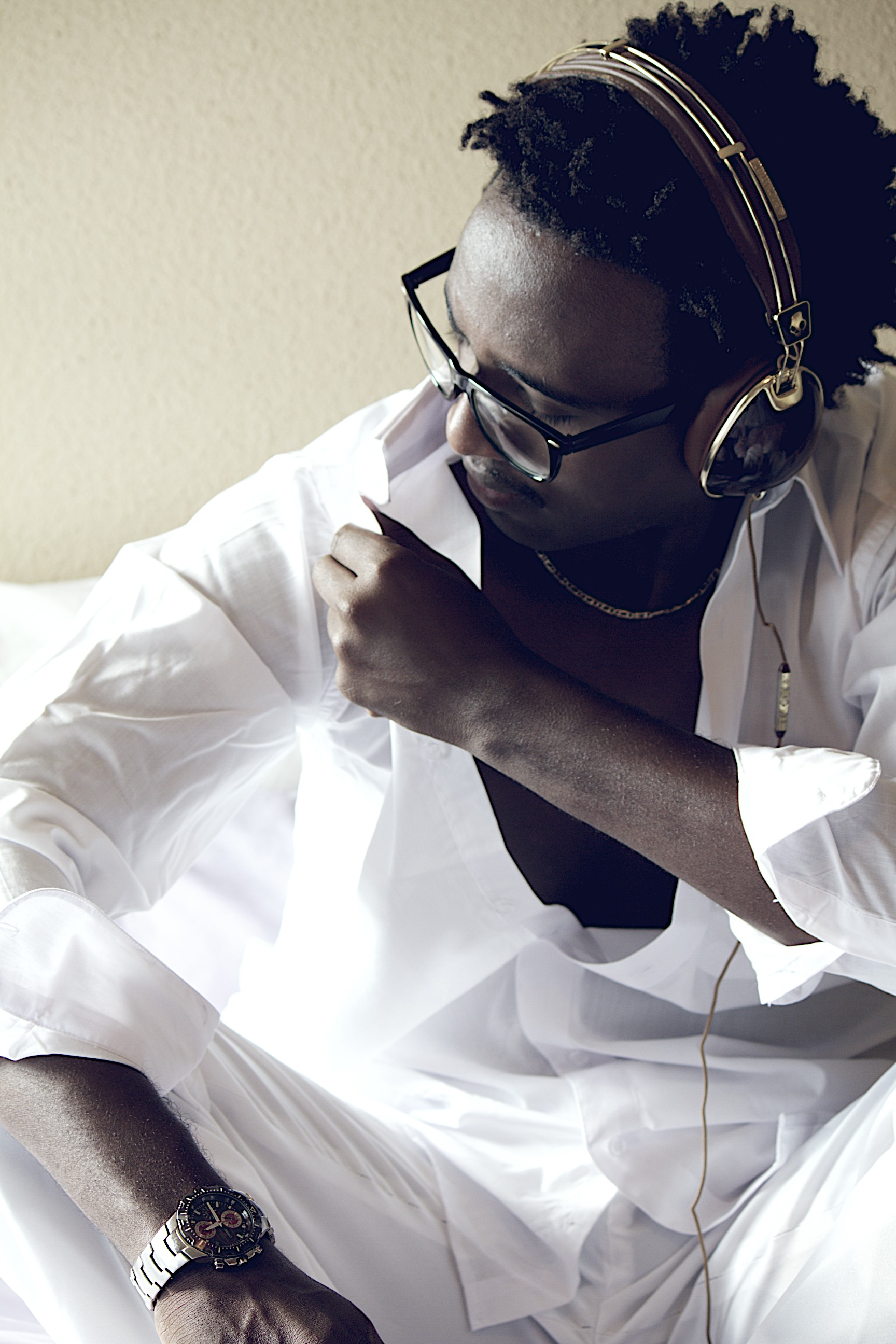
- During Alpha and Rah P Africa Swager Video Shot

Background information
- Also known as: Alpha Rwi
- Born: May 25, 1986 (age 40)
- Origin: Rwandan, Tanzanian
- Occupation: Singer/song writer
- Instrument: Vocalist
- Years active: 2008–present

Alpha Rwirangira (born 25 May 1986) is a Rwandan singer/songwriter. He sings world music, reggae, soul R&B, and dance music all in English, Swahili and Kinyarwanda.

== Music ==
It was after Rwirangira won the East Africa Tusker Project Fame that his professional music career began. This lead him to record and collaborate with Tanzanian A.Y. on a song called Songa Mbele, and Bebe Cool, on Come To Me song.

After the release of the song, rumors began to circulate that Rwirangira "is not a true Rwandan", because he's cousin to A.Y. After winning Tusker Project Fame, Alpha started touring all over East Africa.

In 2010, Rwirangira finalized and released his debut album called One Africa, an album that promoted unity and reconciliation among Africans. He then launched it in Rwanda, Kenya, Uganda, Tanzania, and Burundi.

In 2012 Rwirangira, moved to the United States to attend Campbellsville University, in Kentucky to pursue his music studies.

In 2012 during his Christmas vacation in Rwanda, Rwirangira recorded two singles, one with King James "Connected", "Beautiful" with Peace and "African Swagga featuring Rah P. In 2013 he worked with La'Myia Good on a song called "Heaven".

== One Africa album ==
- Songa Mbele Ft. A.Y. From (Tanzania)
- Come To Me Ft. Bebe Cool (Uganda)
- One Africa
- Mama
- Love Ft. Junior (Rwanda)
- This Child
- Mwami
- Happy Day Ft. Spax (Rwanda)
- Only you
- Ndagukunda “I Love You” Ft. Princes Priscilla (Rwanda)

2- WOW album

• wow

• Son of a king

.• Hashindwi

• Hakuna ft Goodluck Gosbert ( Tanzania )

• Victoria ft Princess Irebe

• Iradukunda

• Amina ft Keilla ( Burundi )

• Zura

• Ishimwe

• Ndaje

• Ni wewe

• Siku yangu

== Awards ==
=== Won ===
- 2010 Pearl of Africa Music Awards – Best Male Rwanda Artist Year
- 2011 Pearl of Africa Music Awards – Best Rwanda Male Artist
- 2011 AMAMU Awards (Afrotainment Museke Africa Music Awards) – Best East African Song of the year for Songa Mbele (Let's move forward).

=== Nominations ===
- 2011 Tanzania Music Awards – Best East African Song for Songa Mbele featuring A.Y.,

== Controversy ==
Alpha Rwirangira won the 2011 Pearl of Africa Music Awards as Rwanda Best Male Artist, but he refused to attend the award ceremony, because he felt it was poorly organized.

Alpha Rwirangira refused to sign with South African Record Label Gallo Record Company as part of Tusker Project Fame Season 3 winnings. He also accused Tusker Project Fame of not helping past winners and they were in this for making money.

In 2015, Alpha Rwirangira reported to have broken up with his longtime girlfriend Esther UWINGABIRE who was among Miss Rwanda 2012 contestants and his promoters Ernesto Ugeziwe and Tijara KABENDERA but both sides didn't confirm the news.
