= Mama Kayai =

Kenyan actress

Mary Kavere
- Born: Mary Kavere; Kenya
- Other names: Mama Kayai
- Occupation: Actress
- Known for: Acting
- Spouse: Saidiel Matano
- Children: 5
- Awards: Grand Warrior awards

Mary Kavere, popularly known as Mama Kayai, is a veteran actor in Kenya and one of the thespians acknowledged for pioneering the acting industry in Kenya. She has been in the industry for about four decades. In 2018 she was honored with the Grand Warrior Award which is also the feted induction to the Riverwood Awards Hall of Fame.

She came into the public limelight in the 1980s following the premier of a popular comical family show, Vitimbi, in 1985 in the state-owned Kenya Broadcasting Corporation, then known as Voice of Kenya (VOK). She later featured in another popular drama Vioja Mahakamani. In the recent days she has been acting in another TV show Jungu Kuu that's aired on K24.

Mama Kayai was acting as the wife of also another celebrated thespian, the late Benson Wanjau, popularly known as Mzee Ojwang' and the two were celebrated as the power couple of Kenyan comedy. Mzee Ojwang', christened the father of family comedy died of pneumonia in 2015.

The Vitimbi crew led by Mama Kayai and Mzee Ojwang' were always accorded an opportunity to entertain the nation in all national holidays.

Kenya's founding president, Mzee Jomo Kenyatta often invited the vitimbi crew to entertain him at his Gatundu home. The late president Daniel Moi was also particularly fond of Mama Kayai and Mzee Ojwang's theatrics and other than according them an opportunity to perform at national holidays, he also invited them to state house.

Former president Mwai Kibaki also regularly invited Mama Kayai and her team to State House.

== Early life ==
Mary Kavere was married to the late Saidiel Matano. They have five sons. She is now a grandmother.

She started her journey in the creative sector as a traditional dancer and singer with a group, known as The Black Golden Stars, in Majengo, Pumwani where she grew up. Kavere later met Mzee Ojwang' and Lucy Wangui (who played a judge on Vioja Mahakamani), in one of her acting auditions. She acknowledges the two for mentoring her and helping nurture her career in acting.

She made her acting debut in the programme Darubini in 1980 before moving to Vitimbi and Vioja Mahakamani respectively both airing on KBC.

== Career ==
=== Awards ===
Mama Kayai was awarded the Lifetime Achievement Award at the 6th Annual Kalasha Awards in 2015 and also got an induction into the Riverwood Hall of Fame in September 2018 after winning the Grand Warrior Award at the Riverwood Awards. In 2026 she was awarded the 'Most Influential Woman Filmmaker' award at the 7th edition of the Women In Film Awards Kenya (WIFA). The awards recognize the achievements, Creativity and influence of women in Kenya's film, TV and Digital Content industry.
