= Africa Nazarene University =

University in Kenya

- Motto: What begins here, Transforms the World
- Type: Private
- Established: 1994
- Founder: Harmon Schmelzenbach
- Affiliations: Church of the Nazarene
- Religious affiliation: Church of Nazarene
- Chancellor: Eugenio Duarte
- Vice-Chancellor: Corlis McGee
- Dean: David Jones, Richard Muguongo, Russel Frazier, Simon Obwatho, Jane Ngure, Lois Musikali, James Obuhuma
- Students: 4,000+ (2018)
- Location: Ongata Rongai, Kenya; 01°24′02″S 36°47′24″E
- Campus: 124 Acres
- Website: https://www.anu.ac.ke/ Homepage]
- Location in Kenya Africa Nazarene University (Africa) Africa Nazarene University (Earth)

Africa Nazarene University is a private Christian-founded university in, Kenya, and an affiliate of The Church of the Nazarene Colleges and Universities around the world. Africa Nazarene University is fully accredited by the Commission for University Education and the International Board of Education.

== Location ==
The main campus is situated in the middle of the Masaai savannah, using the Ole Kasasi road, on 124 acres (50 ha), near the town of Ongata Rongai, adjacent to Nairobi National Park, approximately 22 kilometres (14 mi), by road, south of the city center of Nairobi, Kenya's capital and largest city. The geographical coordinates of the university's main campus are:1°24'02.0"S, 36°47'24.0"E (Latitude:-1.400556; Longitude:36.790000).

== History ==
Africa Nazarene University is a private Christian University and an institution of the Church of the Nazarene International, who follow the Wesleyan holiness tradition. It was established to prepare leaders for the church both at ministerial and laity level. The Church of the Nazarene sought to address African society's challenges in the early 1980s by implementing higher education. Moreover, Africa Nazarene University looked into moulding the younger generation in an upright and Christian based environment. In accordance with the Kenya University's Act of 1985, (provision for establishment of private universities in Kenya), the Church settled on Kenya as a location to start a Nazarene University which became the first one outside North America.

In July 1993, the board of the church granted its authority for the establishment of a university in Africa following a unanimous vote by its members during a General Assembly in Indianapolis, Indiana, USA. The church, through the university's founders, continued to pursue negotiations with the Commission of University Education, then Commission of Higher Education, to establish a degree awarding institution. Therefore, the legal authority to establish the university was given on November 23, 1993, when the commission issued, on behalf of the Kenyan Government, a letter of interim authority for the university to start laying the foundation for the development of Africa Nazarene University.

In August 1994 Dr. Martha John, the university's first Vice Chancellor, opened its doors to 62 students from eleven African countries taking undergraduate courses in Theology and Business Administration and a Masters of Arts in religion. One year later, the university introduced the Bachelor of Science degree in Computer Science, welcoming an additional 42 students.

Professor Leah Marangu took over from Dr. John in January 1996 and was installed as Vice Chancellor in February 1997. On 8 October 2002, the university was granted the charter (Accreditation Credentials) by the government of Kenya, making it the first private university to receive the credential under the new act and without being affiliated with any other university locally and abroad.

== Academic programs ==
- Graduate programs
- Undergraduate programs
- Diploma programs
- Certificate programs
- Other short courses

== Academic schools ==
The university is composed of the following schools:

- School of Religion and Christian Ministry
- School of Science and Technology
- School of Humanities and Social Sciences
- School of Law and art
- School of Business

Starting off with three programs, the university now has 36 programs, offered at the Leah T. Marangu(LTM) Campus in Ongata Rongai, Kenya. The university recently partnered with Coursera as at September 2020

== Institutes ==
Institute of Research

Institute of Open and Distance Learning

== Notable alumni ==
- Kendi Ntwiga, country leader at Microsoft Kenya
- Shikoh Gitau, chief executive officer at Qhala
- Lorna Rutto, founder and director, EcoPost Limited
- Savara Mudigi, vocalist, producer, drummer, disc jockey and actor; member of a popular Kenyan Boys Band Sauti Sol
- Wendy Kimani, a Kenyan singer, songwriter, actress and entertainer; runner-up in the second season of Tusker Project Fame
- Beatrice Elachi, Speaker of the Nairobi County Assembly (2017 until 2022); former Majority Chief Whip in the Senate of Kenya

== See also ==
- Nazarene International Education Association
- List of Church of the Nazarene schools
- List of universities in Kenya
