= Catherine Muraga =

Kenyan computer scientist and corporate executive

- Born: c. 1977 (age 48–49); Uganda
- Education: Africa Nazarene University; Columbia University; Oxford University
- Occupations: Information technology professional and corporate executive
- Years active: 2003–present
- Title: Managing director of the Africa Development Centre at Microsoft

Catherine Muraga (born circa 1977) is a Kenyan information technology professional and corporate executive, who works as the managing director of Microsoft's Africa Development Center (ADC), based in Nairobi, Kenya's capital city. She took up that office on 1 June 2022. Before that, she was the head of engineering at Stanbic Bank Kenya and Stanbic Bank South Sudan.

== Background and education ==
Muraga is Kenyan by birth. After attending local primary and secondary schools, she was admitted to Africa Nazarene University, a private university in Kenya. She graduated from there with a Bachelor of Science in Computer Science. Later, she attended the Fintech Program at the Saïd Business School of the University of Oxford, in the United Kingdom. She also attended the Digital Strategies for Business course at Columbia University, in the United States.

== Career ==
As of June 2022, Muraga's career in information technology went back more than 15 years. She has varied experience in several business sectors including aviation, banking and manufacturing. Previous employers include East African Breweries Limited, Kenya Airways and Sidian Bank, where she worked as the Director of IT and Operations for four and a half years.

At Microsoft's ADC in Nairobi, Muraga replaced Jack Ngare, who served as managing director at the ADC from 2019 when it was established until his resignation in April 2022. In her current position, she leads a team of over 450 computer scientists and engineers.
