= Gabriel K =

Ugandan singer-songwriter

- Born: Gabriel Kakuru; 7 July 1978 (age 47); Kampala Uganda
- Genres: R&B/Soul
- Occupations: singer-songwriter, businessman
- Instrument: Vocals
- Years active: 2018–present
- Website: gabrielkmusic.com

Gabriel Kakuru, professionally known as Gabriel K, is a Ugandan R&B/Soul singer-songwriter and businessman. His debut studio album Done Waiting was released in May 2019 and his second album Love Ocean in February 2020.

== Career ==
Gabriel K joined the music industry as a curtain raiser for other musicians in the 2000s. He then gave music a break and joined radio and television, where he worked as a radio presenter on Monitor FM (now KFM) and also as television host on the defunct WBS Television and CCTV. He retired from radio and television and invested in billboard advertising in the East African region. He returned into music with his debut studio album titled Done Waiting in 2018.

His second album titled Love Ocean was released in February 2020. His March and April scheduled concert tours to promote both albums were cancelled due to the COVID-19 pandemic and lockdown. He then held an online concert called We Just Want Love concert and performed all songs from his two albums.

Gabriel K was discovered by Aflik TV which signed him for his debut acting role in a Nollywood film.

== Discography ==
Done Waiting

- Released: 7 May 2019
- Format: Digital, CD
- Label: Indie
- Writers: Michael Fingaz, Gabriel K, Esther Nabaasa, Ray Signature,
- Producer: Michael Fingaz, Yese Oman Rafiki, Daddy Andre, Sir Dan Magic, DKing, TheWeezy Jonathan, Reymacc Okot and Lledra Illedra
- Tracks: Done Waiting, We Just Wanna Love, What is love, Number "Emu", Gimme the Love, Special Woman, Ndikunoonya. You Know, Kuuma love, Wine Glass, Done waiting (Reggae), Nguwulira, Ndi Wuuwe, Abeela Omu, If I Cant Live With You "Na Ndoto"
- Singles: Done Waiting

Love Ocean

- Released: 20 February 2020
- Format: Digital/Streaming, CD
- Label: Indie
- Writers: Michael Fingaz, Gabriel K, Esther Nabaasa,
- Producer: Michael Fingaz
- Director: Aaronaire (Twanywede)
- Tracks: Never Let You Go, It's Okay, We Just Want Love, Not Ready for Goodbye, Same Again, Dance with Me, See You Dancing, Love Ocean, Let Your Body Communicate, Twanywede, Special Woman, Never Let You Go (Reggae Version), Onsaana, Mirundi Mingi, Don't Misjudge Me, Sweet Loving, Yakale, Easy to Love
- Bonus tracks: Never Let You Go (Reggae Version)
- Singles: Never Let You Go, Twanywede

== See also ==
- Fred Masagazi
- Leila Kayondo
- Rachel K
