= The Future Awards Africa 2014 =

The Future Award Africa
- Date: 7 December 2014
- Location: Intercontinental Hotel, Victoria Island, Lagos State, Nigeria
- Winners: 10
- Website: awards.thefutureafrica.com

The 9th edition of The Future Awards Africa held on the 7th of December, 2014. The event took place at the Intercontinental Hotel, Victoria Island, Lagos and honoured nominees who had made significant impact in the year in diverse categories.

The event was hosted by Iyanya, Osas Ighodaro and Ugandan Channel O VJ, Flavia Tumisiime and had the likes of Wizkid, Funke Akindele, Aṣa, Toke Makinwa, Ice Prince, Timi & Busola Dakolo, Linda Ikeji, Pat Utomi, Rotimi Amaechi, Jimi Agbaje, Denola Grey and Celebrities alike, in attendance.

== Categories, Nominees and Winners ==
=== The Future Africa Awards Prize in Advocacy & Activism ===
1. Winner - Boniface Mwangi, 29: Pawa 254 initiative, Kenya

2. Ola Ojewumi, 23: Sacred Hearts children's transplant foundation and Project ASCEND, Nigeria

3. Kennedy Odede, 29: Shining Hope for Communities, Kenya

4. Abdikadir Aden Hassan, 26: Founding member of Garissa Youth Environment Movement, Kenya

5. David Akpan, 28: UCARE Foundation Nigeria

=== The Future Africa Awards Prize in Agriculture ===
1. Winner - Charles Nichols and Samir Ibrahim; 24, 24: SunCulture, Kenya

2. Nomzamo Khoza, 27: Farmer, South Africa

3. Olawale Isiah Ojo, 25: Agropreneur, Nigeria

4. Eric Muthomi, 27: Stawi Foods, Kenya

5. Nasir Yammama, 24: Farmer, Nigeria

=== The Tony O. Elumelu Prize in Business ===
1. Winner - Andrew Mupuya, 21: Youth Entrepreneurial Link Investments, Uganda

2. Eseoghene Odiete, 24: Hesey Designs, Nigeria

3. Zakaria Hersi, 25: StartUpSomalia.com & 4Weeks4Life, Somalia

4. Ally Edha Awadh, 31: Lake Oil Group, Tanzania

5. Ashley Uys, 30: Medical Diagnostech and OculusID, South Africa

=== The Future Africa Awards Prize in Community Action ===
1. Winner -Jake Okechukwu, 26: Sickle Cell Aid Foundation, Nigeria

2. Emmanuel Olisaeloka Osemeka, 30: Social Welfare Network Initiative, Nigeria

3. Tricia Michaels, 28: Stay In School Initiative, Nigeria

4. Nixon Ochater, 23: Amani Initiative, Uganda

5. David Akpan, 28: UCARE Foundation, Nigeria

=== The Future Africa Awards Prize in Education ===
1. Winner - Philip Obaji Jr, 28: 1 GAME Campaign, Nigeria

2. Regina Agyare, 30: Soronko Solutions, Ghana

3. Ogunlana Olumideand and Obanor Chukwuwezam; 22, 23: Prepclass.com.ng, Nigeria

4. Best Aiyorworth, 22: Founder Girls’ Power Micro Lending Organization, Uganda

5. Adeniyi Oluokun, 28: AccessDrive, Nigeria

=== The Future Africa Awards Prize in Public Service ===
1. Winner - Lukman Jaji, 29: African Union Institute for Education Information Management System, Nigeria

2. Guillermina-Mekuy Mba Obono, 32: Department of Culture and Tourism, Equatorial Guinea

3. Ahmed Salihijo, 30: Infrastructure Concession Regulatory Commission, Nigeria

4. Okwuone Nkechi, 25: Edo State Government, Nigeria

5. Peterson Opio, 28: Australian Aboriginal Development Cooperation, Uganda

=== The Future Africa Awards Prize in Technology ===
1. Winner - Joshua Okello, 23: WinSenga, Kenya

2. Jamilia Abass, Linda Kwamboka, Susan Oguya, – 30, 26, 26: M-Farm, Kenya

3. Anne Amuzu, 29: Nandimobile Company, Ghana

4. Mark Essien, 31: Hotels.ng, Nigeria

5. Lorna Rutto, 28: EcoPost, Kenya

=== The Future Africa Awards Prize in Entertainment ===
1. Winner - Nasibu Abdul Juma (Diamond), 24: Musical Act, Tanzania

2. Michael Kwesi Owusu (Sarkodie), 28: Musical Artiste, Ghana

3. Panshak Zamani, 27: Musical Artiste, Nigeria

4. Ivie okujaye, 28: Actress and producer, Nigeria

5. Yaya Toure, 31: Footballer, Ivory Coast

=== The Future Africa Awards Prize in Enterprise Support ===
1.Winner - Bunmi Otegbade, 27: Generation Enterprise and StrategyQ, Nigeria

2. Sanga Moses, 30: Eco-Fuel, Uganda

3. David Oshei, 27: Dropifi, Kenya

4. Justin Stanford, 30: 4Di Group, South Africa

5. Oluwafemi Bankole, 27: TechCabal.com, Nigeria

=== The Future Awards Prize for African Young Person of the Year ===
1. Winner - Sangu Delle, 27: Cleanacwa, Ghana

2. Joel Mwale, 20: Sky Drop Enterprises and Gigavia.com, Kenya

3. Kayode Disu, 31: ISEC, Nigeria

4. Alengot Oromait, 22: Member of Parliament, Uganda

5. David Adedeji Adeleke (Davido), 21
