= A.Y. (musician) =

Tanzanian musician

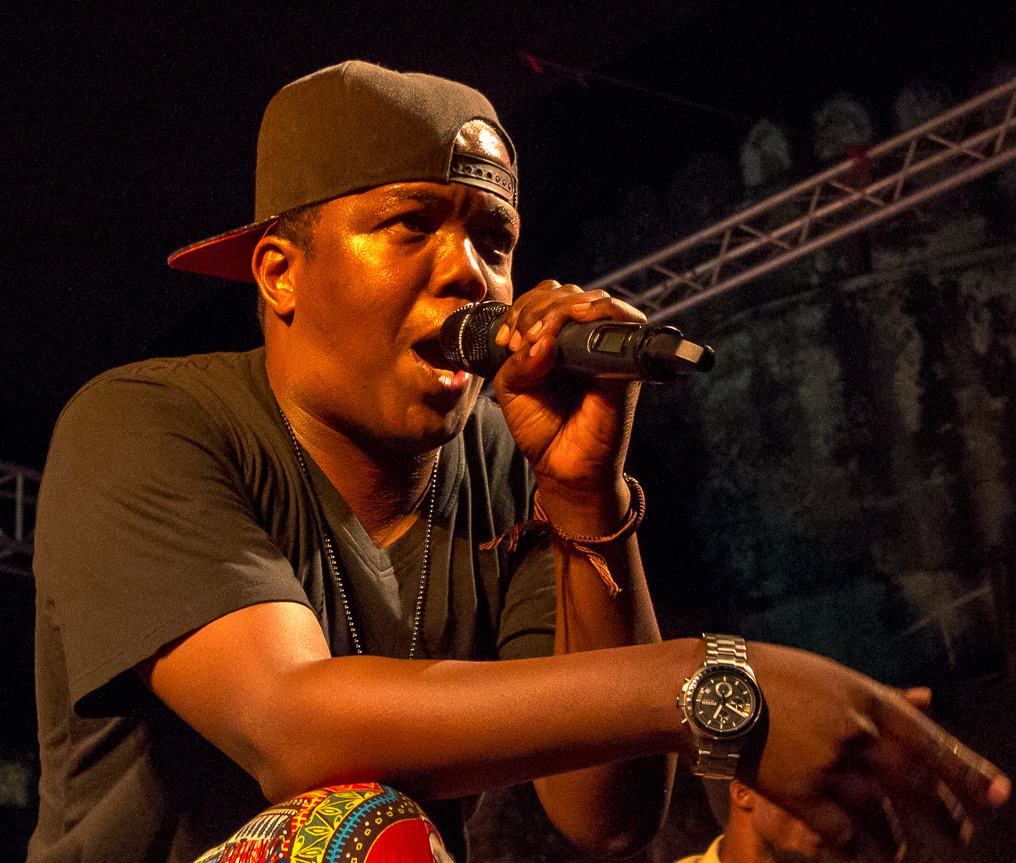
- A.Y. in 2014

Background information
- Born: Ambwene Allen Yessayah; July 5, 1982 (age 44); Mtwara, Tanzania
- Origin: Mtwara Region
- Genres: Bongo Flava, Tanzanian hip hop
- Years active: 1996-present
- Member of: S.O.G
- Formerly of: East Coast Army; East Coast Team

Ambwene Allen Yessayah (born 5 July 1982), better known by his stage name A.Y., is a Tanzanian bongo flava artist of Makonde heritage. He was born in Mtwara, Mtwara Region, Tanzania. He began his career with the group S.O.G. in 1996. He decided to go solo in 2002. A.Y. is among the first bongo flava artists to commercialize hip hop. He was member of the musical group known as East Coast Army, but now he is no longer part of the group. He is still releasing songs and albums collaborating mostly with a former East Coast Army artist Mwana Fa.

A.Y is termed as the first Tanzania musician to start up business and merge music and business and inspire other artist to follow the path.

== Discography ==
- Raha Kamili 2003
- Hisia Zangu2005
- Habari Ndio Hiyo 2008
- "Zigo
- Habari Ndiyo Hiyo
- Kings & Queens Ft. Amani & Jokate
- Microphone Ft. Fid Q
- More & More Ft. Nyashinski
- Touch Me Touch Me Ft. Sean Kingstone & Mis Trinity
- Yule
- Zigo Remix Ft. Diamond Platnumz

== Family ==
In 2017 A.Y proposed to his long time girlfriend Rehma Remy Munyana at the Golden Tulip in Tanzania. In 2018, A.Y and Remy got married. Within the same year 2018, A.Y and his wife welcomed their first Child Aviel Yessayah.

== Awards and nominations ==
=== Won ===
Year	Nominee / work	Award	Result
2007 Tanzania Music Awards	"Usijarib"	Best Hip Hop Single	Won
2007 Kisima Music Awards	Usijarib	Best Video Tanzania	Won
2008 Tanzania Music Awards	Habari Ndio Hiyo Ft Mwana Fa	Collaboration Of The Year	Won
2008 Pearl of Africa Music Awards	Himself	Best Tanzanian Male Artist	Won
2010 Tanzania music awards	Leo Ft Avril (singer)	Best Reggae Song	Won
2012 Channel O Music Video Awards	Himself	Best East African Video	Won

=== Nominations ===
Year	Nominee / work	Award	Result
2005 Kora Awards		Best East African Male Artist	Nominated
2008 Kisima Music Awards	Nangoja Ageuke with Mwana Fa	Tanzanian Video Of The Year	Nominated
2008 Kisima Music Awards	Usiwe Mnali	East African Collaboration Of The Year Ft Amani (musician)	Nominated
MTV Africa Music Awards 2009	Himself	Best Hip Hop	Nominated
2009 Channel O Music Video Awards	Naongea Na Wewe Ft Mwana Fa	Best African East	Nominated
2010 Tanzania music awards	Leo	Best Music Video	Nominated
2011 Tanzania Music Awards	Himself	Best Male Artist	Nominated
2011 Tanzania Music Awards	Usije Mjini Ft Mwana Fa	Best Hip Hop Song	Nominated
2011 Tanzania Music Awards	Dakika Moja Ft Mwana Fa & Hardmad	Best Collaboration Song	Nominated
2011 Tanzania Music Awards	Songa Mbele Ft Alpha Rwirangira	Best East African Song	Nominated
2012 Tanzania Music Awards	Good Look Ft Ms. Triniti	Best Best Ragga/Dancehall Song	Nominated
2012 Channel O Music Video Awards	Speak With Your Body Ft Romeo Miller & La'Myia Good	Video Of the Year	Nominated
