= Rush (Kenyan TV series) =

- Genre: Soap opera
- Created by: Lucy Chodota
- Written by: Loyce Kareri, Russel Bonguen, Nyambura Waruingi
- Directed by: Neil Schell
- Starring: Janet Mbugua; Wendy Kimani; Maryanne Nungo; Wendy Sankale
- Country of origin: Kenya
- Original language: English
- No. of seasons: 1

Production
- Executive producer: Lucy Chodota
- Producer: Brain Kyallo Msafiri
- Production location: Nairobi
- Editor: Reg Chuhi
- Camera setup: Multi-camera
- Running time: 24-27 minutes
- Production company: C-Through Production Ltd

Original release
- Network: Maisha Magic
- Release: 1 September 2014 – 29 May 2015

Rush is a Kenyan television sitcom-soap opera that premiered on Maisha Magic Channel in 2014. It is created and executively produced by Lucy Chodota, the brain behind C-Through Production Ltd The series topbilled by anchor, Janet Mbugua, Maryanne Nungo, singer-songwriter; Wendy Kimani and Wendy Sankale together with an ensemble cast. The series was concluded on May 29, 2015.

== Plot ==
The show follows the personal lives of a friend group of four young cosmopolitan Kenyan women: Pendo, Liz, Ruby and Zoe. Pendo is the owner and chief-editor of "Rush Magazine". With her magazine she seeks to inspire and raise awareness on ways to tackle contemporary real life issues that affect the modern society like pride, marital challenges, motherhood, gender equity, promiscuity, sexuality, chauvinism and giving back to society among other young women and men in an African setting to lead a successful and lavish career and lifestyle.

== Cast ==
=== Main cast ===
- Janet Mbugua as Pendo Odama
- Wendy Kimani as Ruby Shama
- Maryanne Nungo as Liz
- Wendy Sankale as Zoe

=== Recurring cast ===
- Ian Mbugua as Harrison
- Patricia Kihoro as Nana
- Wanja Mworia as Doris
- Scolly Cheruto as Zizi
- Geoffrey Odhiambo as Eric
- Claude Judah as Teju
- Kevin Maina as Ken
- Jennifer Onyango as Dorcas
- Valentine Kamau as Joan
- Jamal Nassir as Charles
- David Gitika as Mr. Abas
- Joed Ngaruiya as Dominic
- Peris Wambui as Maxime
- Peter Kajairo as Rico
- Charles Ouda as Vince
- Eunice Ayuma as Annabelle
- John Wambugu as Melvin
- Abel Amunga as Morris

== Awards and nominations ==
=== 2015 Africa Magic Viewers Choice Awards ===
| Year | Category | Recipient | Result |
|---|---|---|---|
| 2015 | Best Television Series | Rush | Nominated |
| 2015 | Best Costume Designer | Tiona Wangechi | Nominated |
