= Adadi Rajabu =

Tanzanian politician

Honourable Adadi Mohamed Rajabu MP

Member of Parliament for Muheza
- In office 2015–2020
- Succeeded by: Mwana Fa

Personal details
- Born: 20 January 1955 (age 70); Tanganyika Territory
- Political party: Chama Cha Mapinduzi

Adadi Mohamed Rajabu (born January 20, 1955) is a Tanzanian politician and a member of the Chama Cha Mapinduzi political party. He was elected MP representing Muheza in 2015. He is also the Chairman of the house committee on Home Affairs, Defence and Security Parliamentary.
