= 4 Play (TV series) =

Kenyan TV series

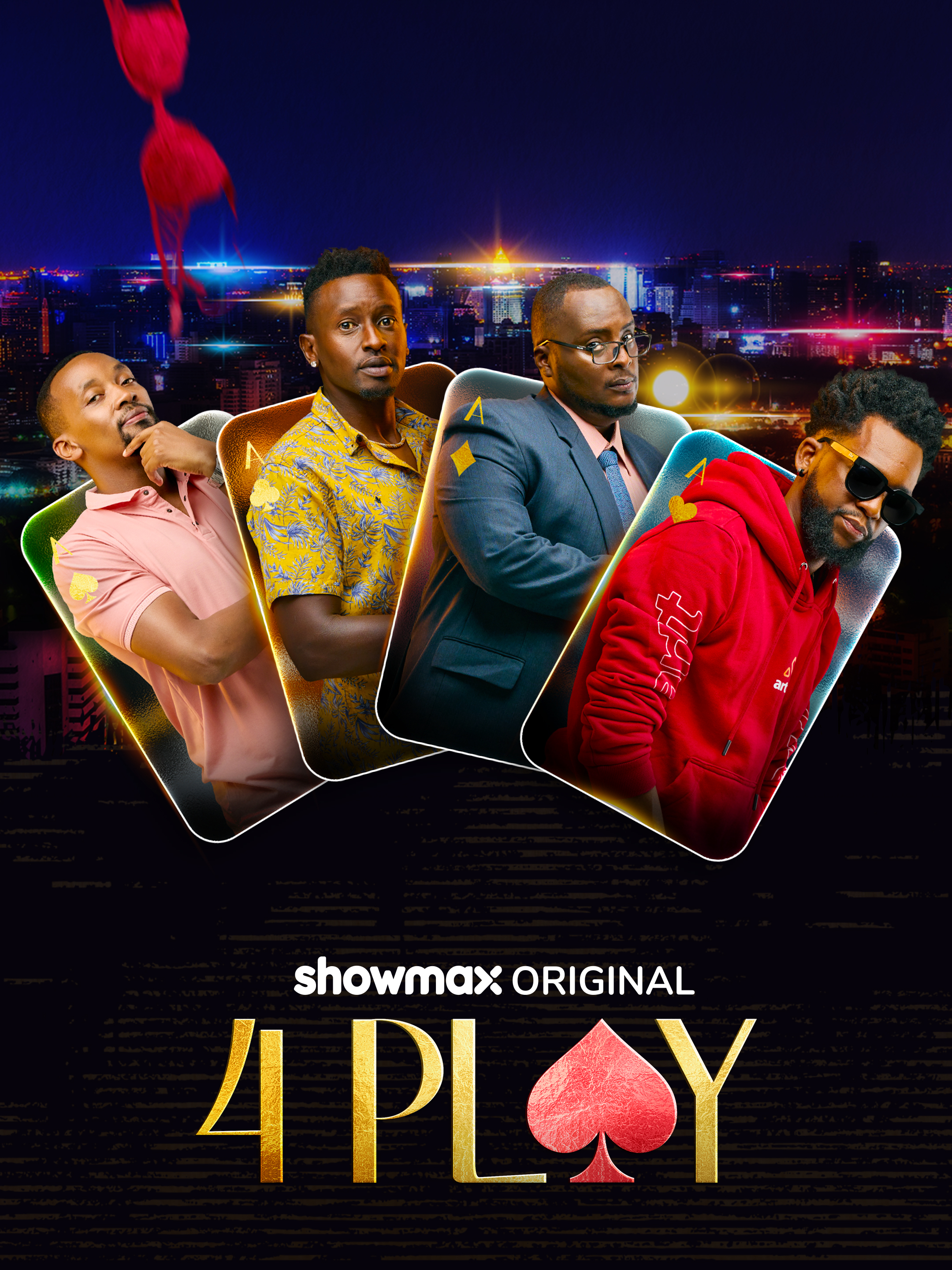
- Genre: Crime Drama
- Created by: James Kombo and Abigael Arunga
- Written by: Abigael Arunga
- Directed by: Mwangi Rurengo; Mkaiwawi Mwakaba; J.A Chumbe
- Starring: Daniel Peter Weke; Bilal Wanjau; Maina wa Kungu; Elsaphan Njora; Patricia Kihoro; Habida Maloney; Tracey Macharia
- Country of origin: Kenya
- Original languages: English; Swahili
- No. of seasons: 1
- No. of episodes: 13

Production
- Producer: James Kombo
- Running time: 40-50 minutes
- Production companies: Showmax; CJ3 Entertainment

Original release
- Network: Showmax
- Release: 25 November 2024 – 6 February 2025

4Play is a 2024 Kenyan crime drama series produced by CJ3 Production for Showmax. The series stars Daniel Peter Weke, Maina wa Ndung'u, Bilal Wanjau, Elsaphan Njau, Patricia Kihoro, Habida Maloney, and Tracy Macharia.

== Plot ==
Malik, Edu, Michael and Allan are four best friends who, despite their chaotic personal lives, find friendship, love and perseverance in Nairobi's concrete jungle.

== Cast ==
- Daniel Peter Weke as Malik
- Maina wa Ndung'u as Edu
- Bilal Wanjau as Michael
- Elsaphan Njau as Allan
- Patricia Kihoro as Candy
- Tracy Macharia as Phiona
- Habida Maloney as Lorna

== Production ==
=== Development ===
According to the producer James Kombo, the series was conceptualized in 2018 together with writer Abigael Arunga.

=== Casting ===
The cast was reported when the series was announced with a line-up including Daniel Peter Weke, Bilal Wanjau, Maina wa Kungu, Elsaphan Njora, Patricia Kihoro, Habida Maloney, and Tracy Macharia.

== Release ==
On 21 November 2024, Showmax released the first two episodes of the series and the subsequent episodes released on a weekly basis.

== Reception ==
=== Critical and audience response ===
The series received a mixed reception. Stanlaus Manthi of Business Daily Africa wrote: "4Play is a decent series that isn't afraid to tackle uncomfortable topics."

Kelvin Kariuki of Sinema Focus commented: "With sex shoehorned into almost every scene to 'keep it spicy,' 4Play ends up as a flaccid and often disconcerting attempt at eroticism."
