= Potash Charles Matathia =

Kenyan scriptwriter

- Born: 23 May 1979 (age 45); Nairobi, Kenya
- Occupation(s): Film director, screenwriter, film composer
- Years active: 2010–present
- Website: The Black Campaign

Potash Charles Matathia (born 23 May 1979) is a scriptwriter from Nairobi, Kenya who is majorly known for writing the script of Nairobi Half Life (2012) which was one of the best selling movies in Kenya.
