= I'm Still Here (Juliana Kanyomozi song) =

Single by Juliana Kanyomozi

from the album Bits and Pieces
- Released: March 30, 2017
- Recorded: Michael Fingerz, (South Africa)
- Genre: R&B; reggae
- Length: 3:16
- Label: Masters Music
- Songwriter(s): Esther Nabaasa
- Producer(s): Michael Fingerz

Juliana Kanyomozi singles chronology
"Woman" (2015)	"I'm Still Here" (2017)	"Right Here" (2017)

Music video
- "I'm Still Here" on YouTube

"I'm Still Here" is an R&B-reggae single by Ugandan singer and actress Juliana Kanyomozi. It was released on March 30, 2017. It is her second song to be released since the passing of her son Keron Raphael Kabugo in 2014. All production of the song, audio and video was done in South Africa.

== Background ==
"I'm Still Here" was written by Esther Nabaasa and produced by Michael Fingerz. Produced at Masters Music. The song was released on Juliana’s official Youtube channel on March 30, 2017. The song basically celebrates a strong woman, who however much and longer they are weighed down by hardships, they still get up and move on.

"I'm Still Here" is a song inspired by not only Juliana’s life, but by a multitude of experiences and challenges in general as well as the human power to overcome and conquer the insurmountable! …” The lyrics portray someone who has gone through a lot of hardships but still stands strong which is a reflection to the singer’s own life after losing her one and only son back in 2014.

== Reception ==
The song was well received because of its message but the video was negatively received by many Ugandans on social media who said that Juliana had plagiarized the video theme from Jennifer Lopez’s '"I Aint Your Mama'". Juliana, however, denied copying from Jenny during a radio interview, Celeb Select with Crystal Newman citing that she had never even watched Jennys I aint your mama. She continued to say that her video producer named Candice had written the script.

== Video ==
The video was produced by Candice and directed by Justin Campos. It was shot on location in South Africa and features Juliana in different roles as a housewife mopping the floor and doing laundry. She also acts as a student in glasses, as a queen, as beauty pageant and as a gym freak woman.

The video trended at number 1 on YouTube in Uganda for over a week after its release on the site and has accumulated over 604,000 views as of January 2018.

== Track listing and formats ==
- Digital download
1. "I am still here" – 3:16

== Credits and personnel ==
- Juliana Kanyomozi - Artiste
- Esther Nabaasa - songwriter
- Michael Fingerz – Producer
- Robin Kohl and Gregory Nottingham - Mixing
- Robin Kohl – Mastering
- Justin Campos – Video Director
- Candice - Video producer
- Sanette Van Schalkwyk (Shifting Sands African Couture) - Stylist
- Precious Xaba - Makeup artist

== Charts ==
Chart (2017)	Peak position
Uganda HiPipo Charts	1

== See also ==
- Nsikatila
- Sitya Loss
- Balikoowa
