= Kendi Ntwiga =

Kenyan business executive

- Born: Kendi Ntwiga; 30 May 1980 (age 46); Nairobi, Kenya
- Citizenship: Kenyan
- Education: Africa Nazarene University
- Occupation: Business Executive
- Employer: Meta (2023–present)
- Known for: Information and Technology
- Notable work: Check Point (General manager); Microsoft (Country director); Meta (Global director)
- Title: Global director at Meta
- Board member of: Mercy Corps; KCB Group

Kendi Ntwiga (born 30 May 1980), is a Kenyan business executive. Since October 2023, Ntwiga has served as the Global Head for Actor Solutions at Meta Platforms based in Dublin, Ireland. Prior to that appointment, she was the Global Head of Misrepresentation at the same company since May 2022. In 2015, Ntwiga founded SheGoesTech, an initiative started in Kenya with the aim of encouraging women to pursue a career in STEM. She has served on the boards of Mercy Corps (since July 2021) and KCB Group.

From 2005 to 2022, Kendi held various senior positions for international technology companies based in Africa. She served as Country Director for Microsoft in Kenya from January 2020 to April 2022, and as East and North Africa Regional Director at Check Point between 2017 and 2019. Starting in 2011, she served for 5 years at Oracle Corporation in Kenya, as the director responsible for their East and Southern Africa market. Between 2008 and 2011, Ntwiga was a manager at HP, responsible for software sales in East Africa.

== Early life and education ==
Kendi was born in Kenya on May 30, 1980. She joined Technical University of Kenya prior to attending Africa Nazarene University, where she graduated with a bachelor's degree in international business management in 2014. In 2019, she obtained certificates in Babson College's Entrepreneurial Leadership Program.

== Career ==
From 2005 to 2008, Kendi served as the manager responsible for business development at Paynet Group (which was acquired by Interswitch in 2014). Subsequently, she was appointed manager responsible for software sales in East Africa at HP Inc until July 2011. In August of the same year she joined Oracle Corporation, serving in their Nairobi, Kenya location as a manager responsible for East and Southern Africa market. Kendi occupied this position for 5 years until August 2016.

In May 2017, Kendi was appointed East and North Africa Regional Manager at Check Point. She served this position until July 2019, when she was promoted within the company to become the General Manager of the East, West, and Central Africa cluster. In January 2020, she joined Microsoft to serve as the country director for Kenya, a position she occupied until April 2022. In May of that year, Kendi joined Meta Platforms, in Ireland, to serve as global head responsible for misrepresentation. The position she left when she was appointed as global head responsible for actor solutions based in Dublin, Ireland in October 2023.

== Recognitions ==
- 2015: TechWomen Emerging Leader by the US government.
- 2019: Top 40 under 40 women leaders in Kenya.
- 2021: Top 50 C-suite women in Africa.
- 2021: Top 25 Most Transformative Leaders Impacting Business.
- 2022: Top 15 Kenyan women CEO's leading companies.
- 2022: Top C-suite women in Africa.
- 2023: Africa's 30 most influential executives.
