= Mkaiwawi Mwakaba =

Kenyan filmmaker

Mkaiwawi Mwakaba is a Kenyan film editor, director, and writer working in film and television.

== Early life and education ==
Mwakaba studied communication with a specialization in film and television. She began her career in journalism before transitioning into film production.

== Career ==
Mwakaba has worked in the Kenyan film industry in editorial and directing roles.

She is credited as an editor on the feature film Nairobi Half Life (2012), which was selected as Kenya's submission to the Academy Award for Best Foreign Language Film.

She has also directed television content, including the drama series 4Play, released on Showmax.

Mwakaba co-directed the short film Bella is Dying, part of a collection of films addressing sexual and reproductive health and social issues.

== Awards ==
She received the Best Director (Film) award at the Women in Film Awards Kenya.

== Selected filmography ==
- Nairobi Half Life (2012) – Editor
- Bella is Dying – Co-director
- 4Play – Director
