= Harmon Schmelzenbach =

Christian missionary to Kenya

Harmon Lee Schmelzenbach III (December 18, 1935 - January 2, 2019) was the founder of Africa Nazarene University (ANU) in Kenya, East Africa. He was the grandson of Harmon Faldean Schmelzenbach who began the missionary work of the Nazarene Church in Africa in 1910.

As a Career Assignment Missionary to the Church of the Nazarene, Schmelzenbach continued the family missionary work that started with his grandfather and continued by his father Elmer “Vusigama” Schmelzenbach.

Schmelzenbach was born to Elmer and Mary in Idaho, raised in Eswatini and educated in South Africa and Idaho. He was first appointed to Africa in 1960, and laid the groundwork for the establishment of the Nazarene Church in many countries across East Africa. This effort culminated with the establishment of ANU in 1987 on land that he chose and arranged for purchase. The purpose of founding ANU was an effort to train local pastors and church leaders for the ever-increasing reach of the Nazarene Church in Africa.

He spent 34 years working in Africa, including South Africa (1960-1976), Namibia (1976-1984), Kenya (1984-1992) and two years in Ethiopia; he retired in 2001.

Schmelzenbach is third in a line of five generations of missionaries of the Nazarene church. His son, Harmon R. Schmelzenbach works in the South Pacific area as the Field Strategy Coordinator for the Melanesian and South Pacific Fields for the Church of the Nazarene; his son Quinton is also a missionary and speaker.

== Publications ==
Schmelzenbach wrote a biography of his grandfather, which was published in 1971.

== Family ==
Schmelzenbach was married to Beverley and they had three children.
