= Barbara Minishi =

- Born: Nairobi, Kenya
- Occupations: Photographer and art director
- Website: http://barbarakminishi.com

Barbara Minishi is a Kenyan filmmaker, visual artist, fashion photographer and art director whose explorative themes are driven by cyclical mythic journeys of self, nature, alchemy and arcana and intuitive embodied expression visual arts. As an art director she has worked on films and a music video, and also for Kapringen (A Hijacking), a Danish feature film from 2003. In Kenya, she is among the most highly regarded professional fashion photographers. Minishi's photo series has been featured in the book 9 Photographers from Kenya published in association with the National Museums of Kenya.

== Biography ==
Barbara Minishi, from Nairobi, Kenya, graduated in 2003 with a BA degree in communication. Her career as a professional photographer begun when she realized the heart connection images elicited within her.

Minishi says, "Photography was how i begun my creative exploration and somehow one could say that the camera became a tool for me to expose, deconstruct, and play with such inscriptions of identity. It was my ‘voice’ and a way of being that created ‘events’ in which i could engage with themes such as stereotypes and ethnicity, land and belonging, emotive expression, urban influence and beauty....There is an interaction with the hidden intentions and collaboration with emerging transformative expression plus the conscious co-creation with new landscape, culture and ideas."

Her work is continually evolving and she is currently working on writing and directing her feature film and other projects such an experimental short films, fashion videos, commissioned documentaries, paintings, and writing.

== Awards ==
Minishi won Best Art Director for her work on the film Nairobi Half Life at the 2014 African Magic Viewer's Choice Awards in March 2014.
