= Shikoh Gitau =

Kenyan computer scientist and technology innovator

Dr. Cikū Gitaū
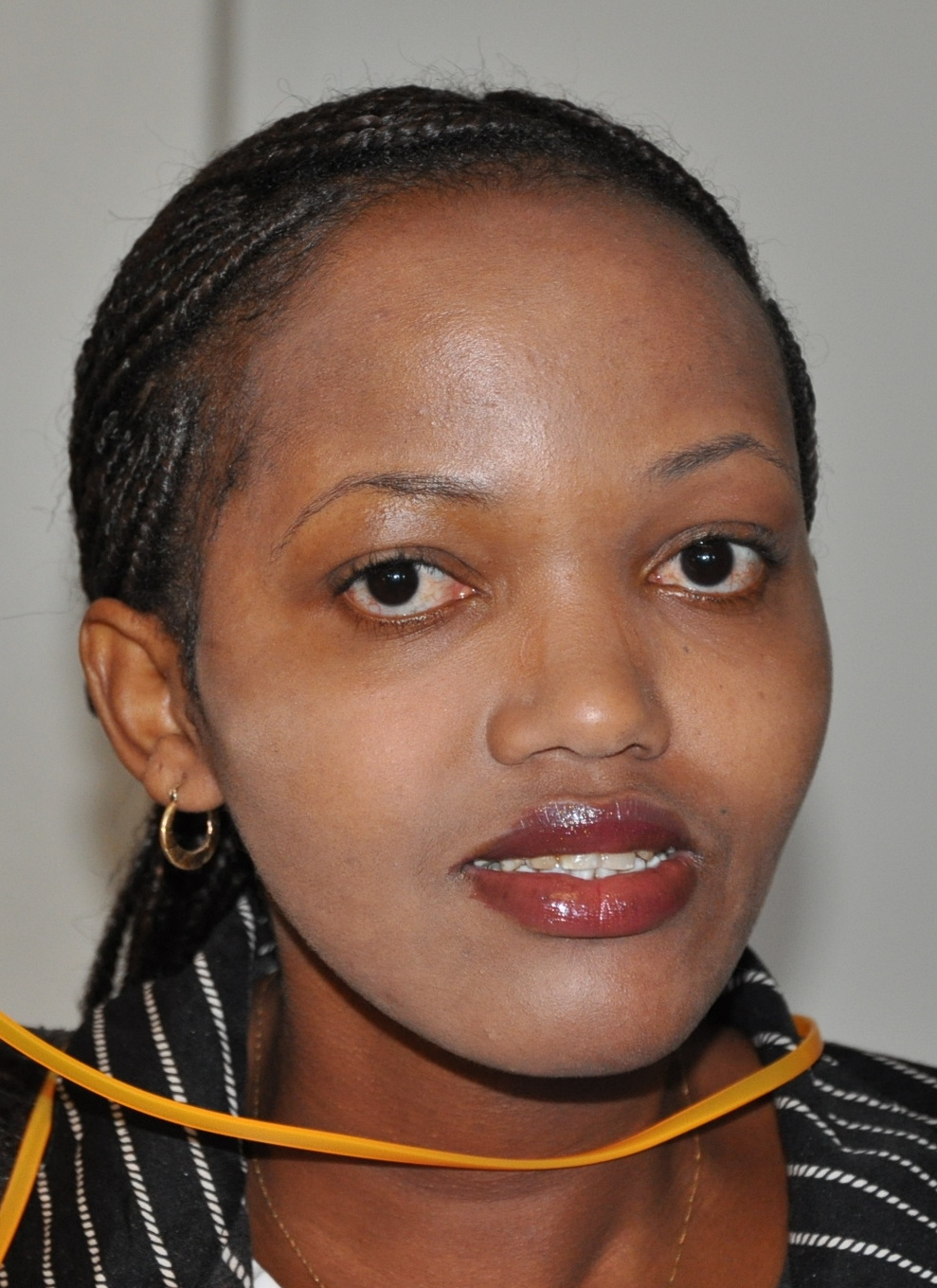
- At Sangonet's 2009 conference
- Born: c. 1981; Mathare, Kenya
- Education: Africa Nazarene University; University of Cape Town
- Known for: M-Ganga (founder); Ummeli (founder)

Dr. Cikū Gitaū (born c. 1981) is a Kenyan computer scientist. She finished her undergraduate studies in Computer Science at the Africa Nazarene University and attained her PhD at University of Cape Town. She is known for inventing M-Ganga and Ummeli, mobile applications for promoting health and medicine and matching unemployed workers with employment opportunities. Gitaū was the first African to win the Google Anita Borg Memorial Scholarship, received in the Grace Hopper Celebration of Women in Computing based on her inventions and thesis. Up until August 2017, she contributed and managed the Technology Innovations for Inclusive Growth program, at the Africa Development Bank (AfDB).

Dr Cikū Gitaū is currently serving as the Chief Executive Officer of Qhala, a technology company involved in Africa's digital transformation, that she founded in 2020.

== Early life ==
Gitaū was born to a working-class family in Mathare. Soon after her birth, her family lost their property in Mathare in the aftermath of the 1982 Kenyan Coup D'état Attempt and were forced to settle with relatives in Nakuru. During her childhood in Nakuru, Gitaū saw her first collegiate graduation ceremony on television. She credits witnessing a woman receive a PhD from then-president Daniel arap Moi during this broadcast with motivating her to pursue higher education.

Gitaū completed her undergraduate studies at the Africa Nazarene University (ANU) in Nairobi. Her career at ANU was marked by academic excellence: she remained on the Honor Roll and Dean's List during all four years of her education, and earned the university's Merit and Leadership Awards in 2003 and 2005, respectively. After receiving her degree, she worked briefly as a UNICEF volunteer before taking a job as a program's assistant at the Centre for Multiparty Democracy, a Kenyan political activism group. She worked there until 2007, when she enrolled in the University of Cape Town to pursue an M.Sc. and subsequently a PhD in Computer Science.

== Career ==
Gitaū has worked in a plethora of different areas to benefit African development. Her most notable career achievement is her mobile application "Ummeli". This application, created in June 2010, matches unemployed people with employers in need of their skills. Due to its low cost and practical use, its potential to change unemployment in labor markets is very high. Umelli is available in South Africa now and is projected to become available in other African countries. In December 2010, Gitaū started working for Google Inc's Emerging Markets where she "identified, researched and designed the www.beba.co.ke concept and worked on its introduction to Kenya’s Transit system". In January 2011, Gitaū was a co-founder and research mentor for iHub_Research, where she was on the forefront of research on mobile internet usage in Africa and worked on the Microsoft oneApp project. From January 2015 to August 2017, Gitaū worked in the ICT department of the African Development Bank (AfDB) working on developing various projects with different governments across Africa.

She later on worked at Safaricom from September 2017 to January 2020, a period in which she steered the company's Alpha innovation and digital transformation strategy. In April 2020, alongside other members, she was appointed by the then Cabinet Secretary for ICT, Joseph Mucheru, to the COVID-19 ICT Advisory Committee. They were tasked with helping the government in responding to the pandemic, using innovative technological solutions.

She is currently the CEO of Qhala.

Dr Gitaū serves in committees and sits in boards of the following companies:

- Kenya National Innovation Agency (KeNIA)- Co-chair, National Innovation Technical Committee.
- International Centre of Insect Physiology and Ecology (ICIPE)- Member, Partnership for skills in Applied Sciences, Engineering and Technology (PASET) Regional Scholarship and Innovation Fund Grants Independent Technical Committee.
- Lacuna Fund- Member, Steering Committee.
- Integrated Payments Service Limited- Non Independent Board Member.
- Africa Nazarene University- Member, University Council.
- The Open Institute- Member, Board of Directors.
- The Tech Interactive- Board Director.
- Longhorn Publishers PLC- Independent Board Director.

== Awards and recognitions ==
On 31 July 2013, Gitaū became one of three people to win the ABIE Change Agent Award. She made history by becoming the first African to win the Google Anita Borg Memorial Scholarship. She was recognized with fellow honorees in Minneapolis, Minnesota on October 5 during the Grace Hopper Celebration of Women in Computing (GHC).

In 2017, Gitaū was recognized as the Most Influential Women CEO Global for East Africa under the Information and communications technology (ICT) sector by the Independent Magazine.

=== Other ===
- 2005 Top Ten Finalists for Oxford Rhodes Memorial Scholarship
- 2013 AfroElle Power List of African women who affect change
- 2015 Top 40 under 40 women to watch in Kenya
- 2015 ASPEN New Voices Fellow
