= Lorna Rutto =

Kenyan entrepreneur

- Born: 1984 (age 41–42); Nakuru, Kenya
- Education: Africa Nazarene University (BCom)
- Occupation: Ecopreneur
- Years active: 2009-
- Known for: Ecopost
- Awards: Future Awards Africa (2014); Cartier Women's Initiative Award (2011); Acumen Fund (2011); World Wide Fund for Nature (2010); SEED Award (2010)
- Website: www.ecopost.co.ke

Lorna Rutto (born 1984) is a Kenyan ecopreneur, and founder of Ecopost, a social enterprise that manufactures fencing posts and other products from recycled plastic waste in offering sustainable jobs to people in marginalized communities and solutions to Kenya's plastic waste challenge.

== Early life, education ==
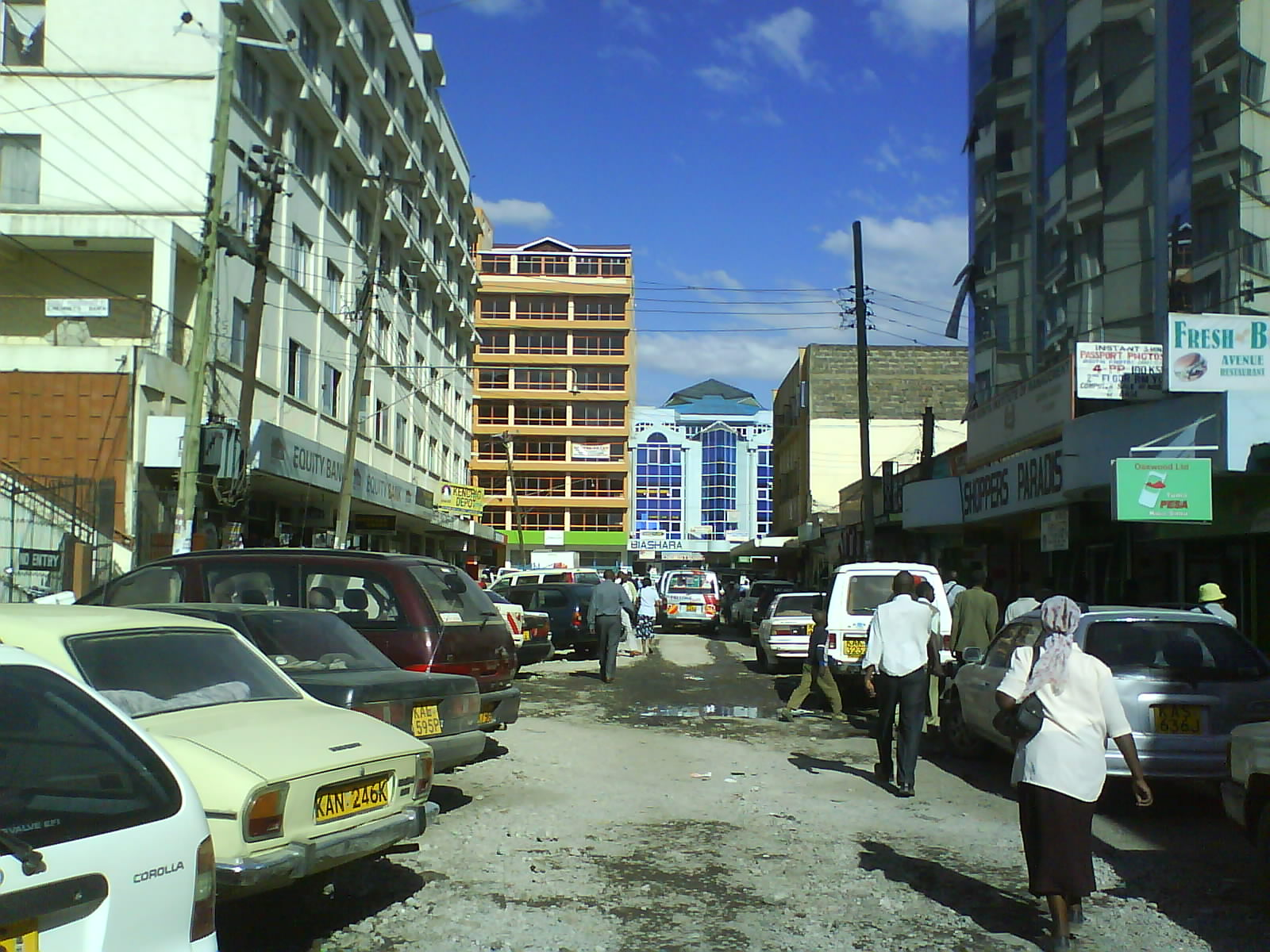
Nakuru Town, Kenya

Lorna Rutto was born in 1984 in the Kaptembwa Slums of Nakuru, Kenya, her upbringing was marked by the stark realities of poverty and environmental degradation. Growing up amidst overflowing sewers and streets strewn with waste, she developed an early awareness of the pressing need for waste management solutions. This awareness laid the foundation for her endeavours in environmental entrepreneurship. She holds a Bachelor of Commerce degree in accounting from African Nazarene University. Despite entering the banking sector post-graduation, Lorna felt a disconnect between her career and her passion for environmental conservation.

== Career ==
In 2008 she was hired at Imperial Bank, one of the largest banks in Kenya, two years later, she left her banking job and ventured into entrepreneurship. Inspired by her commitment to environmental sustainability, she founded EcoPost alongside her co-founder, Charles Kalama, in 2009. EcoPost specializes in recycling plastic waste collected from various sources across Nairobi to manufacture durable and eco-friendly fencing posts. Lorna propelled EcoPost to become a leading player in Kenya's waste management and environmental conservation landscape.

=== Ecopost ===
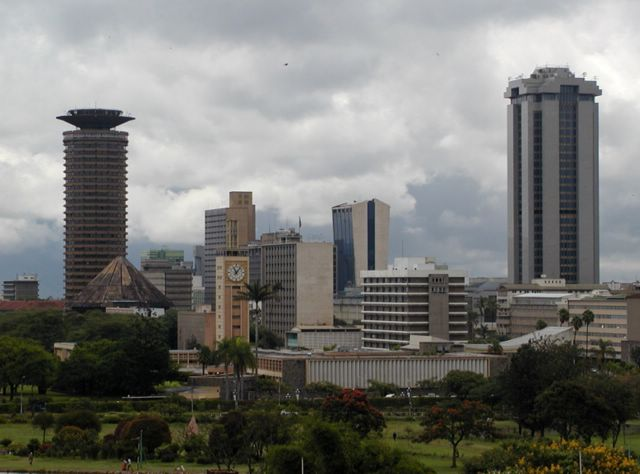
Nairobi, Kenya

In 2009 Lorna founded Ecopost alongside her co-founder, Charles Kalama, to offer a sustainable substitute to timber while concurrently fostering socio-economic growth. The founding was inspired by her upbringing in the Slum of Nakuru, and growing amidst overflowing sewers and street strewn with waste. Ecopost is based in Nairobi, Kenya.

In the past 15 years EcoPost has recycle over 13 million kilograms of plastic waste, catalyzing the creation of more than 300 direct employment opportunities and fostering approximately 12,000 indirect income avenues within marginalized communities. Additionally, the conservation efforts extend to the preservation of approximately 4,500 acres of forests and the mitigation of over 160 million kilograms of CO_{2} emissions. Presently, EcoPost procures 30 tonnes of waste on a monthly basis, channeling this resource towards the fabrication of construction materials essential for diverse applications such as fencing, residential structures, and traffic signage. Notably, in 2015, EcoPost recorded a turnover of 65 million FCFA (equivalent to 100 thousand euros).

== Recognition ==
Lorna's contribution to environmental sustainability has earned her widespread recognition. In 2011, she was named one of the Top 40 Women under 40 in Kenya by Business Daily Africa.

In 2012 She was featured on 'The 20 Youngest Power Women in Africa by Forbes also in 2012 she was nominated by the Guardian among Africa's Top 25 women achievers. In 2013, she was named the Schwab Foundation Social Entrepreneur of the Year for Africa, and in 2014, she was awarded the United Nations Person of the Year for Kenya.

== Awards ==
2014 – Future Awards Africa

2011 – Cartier Women's Initiative Award Sub-Saharan Laureate

2011 – Acumen Fund winner

2010 – SEED Award

2010 – World Wide Fund for Nature Award (Bid Network Winner)

2010 – Bid Network Nature Challenge Award.

2009 – Enablis Energy Safaricom Business Launchpad Award.

2017 – Sri Sathya Sai Award
