= Wendy Kimani =

Kenyan actor (born 1986)

Wendy Kìmani
- Born: 18 May 1986 (age 39); Nairobi, Kenya
- Occupations: Singer; songwriter; actress
- Years active: 2008–present
- Spouse: Marvin Onderwater
- Musical career
- Genres: R&B; neo soul; jazz; pop; soul; afro pop
- Instrument: Vocals

Wendy Kìmani (born 18 May 1986) is a Kenyan singer, songwriter, actress and entertainer. She came into prominence after being the first runners-up in the second season of Tusker Project Fame. As a singer she is known for her songs; "Haiwi Haiwi" featuring Bien of Sauti Sol, "Chali", "Unajua" featured by Gilad among others. She released her debut album dubbed as My Essence launched in August 2013. As an actress she is known for starring in the television series, Rush.

== Early life ==
Kìmani was born in 1986 and raised in Nairobi, in Kenya. She developed her singing talent by listening to other musicians.

== Career ==
=== 2008: Tusker Project Fame ===
In March 2008, Wendy and other participants battled out at the TPF 2 auditions where she was chosen both at the audition and at the eviction gala. After 71 days of working in the academy, she was only put on probation twice (the second time every single remaining contestant was put on probation for the semi-finals by the then judges). On 22 June 2008, Kìmani lost out the coveted price of ksh5 million among others, to Esther Nabaasa, a Ugandan. Among the finalists were the latter, David as the second runners-up and Victor took the fourth position.

=== 2012–13 ===
On 13 August 2013, Kìmani released her debut album, My Essence, stylized as ME.

=== 2014 ===
In February 2014, she, Lenana Kariba and Charles Kìarie starred in television film, Die Husband Die!, a story about Lynette (Kimani) living a loveless marriage with an older man (Charles Kìarie), but she falls in love with a younger man (Lenana Kariba). On 20 May 2014, Kimani featured Sauti Sol's Bien Aime in her new single "Haiwi Haiwi". The song was shot and directed by Mushking. In November that year, she released her second single for 2014, "Chali", shot and directed by Enos Olik. The song is a bit old school and has some jazz chords.

=== 2015–present ===
In early April 2015, Gilad Millo an Israeli former deputy ambassador based in Kenya, featured Kìmani his hit single "Unajua", a Swahili word for "Do You Know". A song that talked about two former lovers contemplating about their current love life gone sour. The song was critically acclaimed, a massive hit and receiving much air play in both radio and television stations making it one of Kenya's best 2015 songs.

== Personal life ==
Kìmani married her long term Dutch fiancé Marvin Onderwater on 9 August 2014 in Nairobi.

== Discography ==
Year	Single(s)	Producer/director	Album	Ref(s)
2010	"Hunielewi" (Wendy Kimani feat. Labalaa)	–	My Essence	
2011	"Rumour"	–	My Essence	
2013	"Hush Up"	–	My Essence	
2014	"Haiwi Haiwi" (Wendy Kimani feat. Bien Aime	Mushking	TBA	
2014	"Well Seasoned 2 - Go Tell It On the mountain" (Victor Saii feat. Wendy Kimani)	–	TBA	
2014	"Chali"	Enos Olik	TBA	
2015	"Unajua" (Gilad feat. Wendy Kimani)	Mushking FX	TBA	(Note: This single was recorded by Israeli singer Gilad Milo along with Kimani)

== Filmography ==
Year	Title	Role	Notes
2008	Tusker Project Fame	Herself	Finalist; 1st runners-up
2014	Die Husband Die	Lynette	Lead role; television film
2014–	Rush	Ruby	Lead role
