= Nairobi Half Life =

2012 Kenyan film

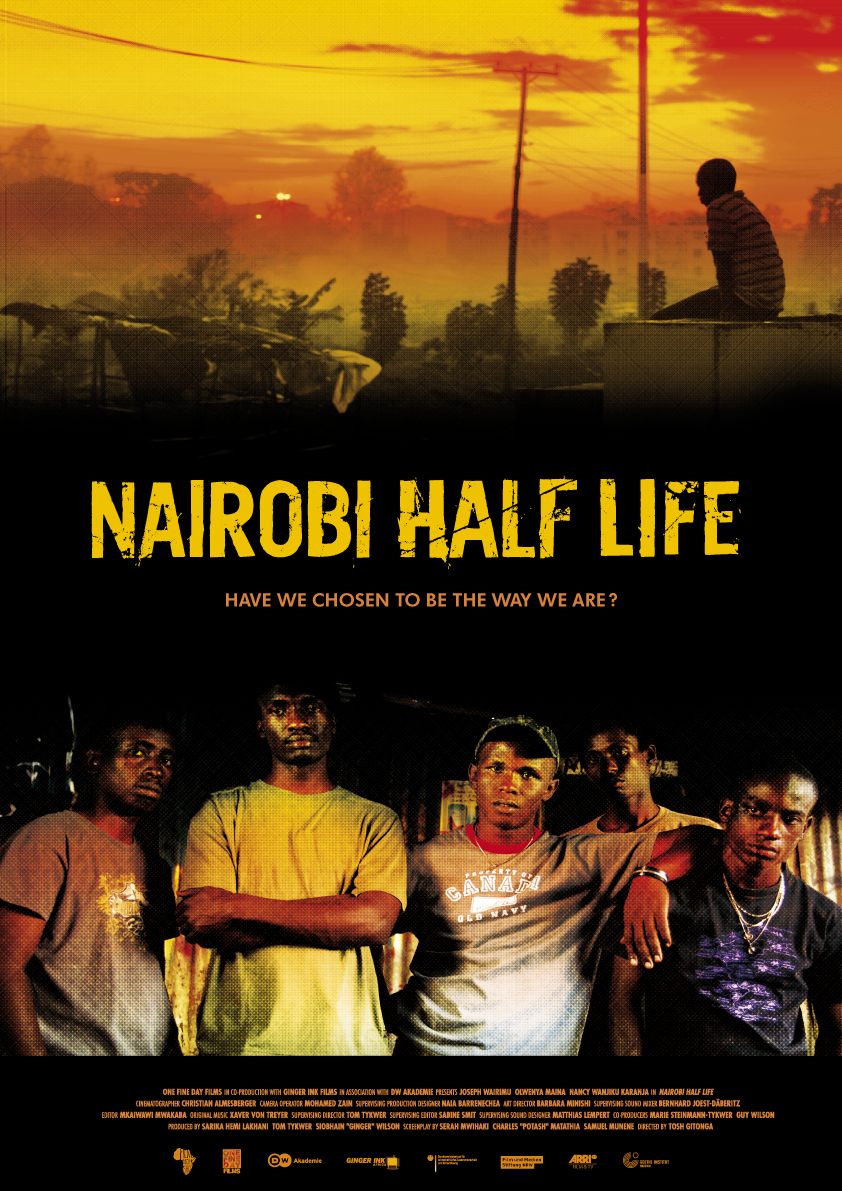
- Film poster
- Directed by: David "Tosh" Gitonga
- Written by: Billy Kahora; Potash Charles Matathia; Samuel Munene; Serah Mwihaki
- Produced by: Sarika Hemi Lakhani; Tom Tykwer; Ginger Wilson
- Starring: Joseph Wairimu; Olwenya Maina; Shix Kapyenga; Mugambi Nthiga
- Cinematography: Christian Almesberger; Lawrence Kimani; Meshack Oduor; Violet Otindo; Mohamed Zain
- Edited by: Mkaiwawi Mwakaba; Abdallaza; Sabine Smit
- Music by: Xaver von Treyer
- Production companies: One Fine Day Films; Ginger Ink Films
- Distributed by: trigon-film Juno Films; Rushlake Media
- Release date: 19 July 2012 (Durban Film Festival)
- Running time: 100 minutes
- Country: Kenya Germany
- Languages: Swahili; English; Sheng; Kikuyu
- Budget: €500,000

Nairobi Half Life (Swahili: Nusu Maisha ya Nairobi) is a 2012 Kenyan drama film directed by David "Tosh" Gitonga. The film was selected as the Kenyan entry for the Best Foreign Language Oscar at the 85th Academy Awards but did not make it to the final shortlist. It was the first time Kenya had submitted a film in this category.

At the 33rd Durban International Film Festival, Joseph Wairimu won the award for Best Actor. He also won the Africa Movie Academy Award for Most Promising Actor from the Awards 9th ceremony. It won the most awards at Africa Magic Viewers Choice Awards 2014.

== Plot ==
A young man, Mwas (Joseph Wairimu) still lives with his parents in their rural home in Kenya. He makes a living by selling Western action films, he dramatically acts and portrays most of the action figures in his films in order to entice his customers. He is an aspiring actor, and when he comes across a group of actors from Nairobi performing in his town, he asks one of them to help him jump-start his acting career. But, in return, he is asked to give Ksh1000 in order for him to be cast in one of the plays. He can only afford Ksh500 and is told to take the other 500 with him to the National Theatre in Nairobi. He is very excited, and, after receiving some money from his mother, he embarks on his journey to Nairobi with a brief stopover in his town to bid his friends goodbye. He meets his cousin (a gang leader), who gives Mwas an expensive radio system and some money to take to Khanji Electronic Shop in downtown Nairobi.

After making his way to Nairobi, he quickly learns that there is more to Nairobi than just opportunities and glamour. On the first day, Mwas loses everything he has brought to Nairobi after he is assaulted by thugs who leave him stranded, confused, and lonely. He gets arrested and even spends a day in jail. In a twist of events, he meets a Nairobi crook, Oti (Olwenya Maina) who becomes a close friend and takes him into his criminal gang. The gang itself specializes in snatch and grab thievery with vehicle parts being their main targets. During this time, Mwas auditions and successfully lands a part in a local play set up by Phoenix Players. He finds himself struggling and juggling the two separate worlds. Mwas finally meets his cousin again, who ends up forcing him to steal a car in order to clear his debt. He convinces the gang to move up from stealing parts to stealing cars in order to earn more. Carjacking proved to be a very dangerous activity after the first attempt ended up with Mwas and a fellow gang member of Oti's gang being injured in a fight at the meeting place. Later on, the carjackings are successful, yielding profits that the members share with each other.

A misunderstanding breaks out between Oti's gang and the other one run by a gang leader that ultimately leads to the death of the latter, who died by being impaled by a sharp object when Mwas started confronting him. This attracts the attention of the police, and the two parties are arrested, but two corrupt law enforcement officers single out Oti's crew and take them to a secret location that seems abandoned. It was a site of execution to rub off the traces of unsolved Nairobi Crimes. A skirmish erupts, leading to the wipeout of the whole crew, but Mwas survives. During that time, he falls in love with Oti's onscreen love interest, Amina, coming to see her at the lodgings at which she receives customers and even taking her out to the films.

== Cast ==
- Joseph Wairimu as Mwas
- Olwenya Maina as Oti
- Nancy Wanjiku Karanja as Amina
- Mugambi Nthiga as Cedric
- Paul Ogola as Mose
- Antony Ndung'u as Waf
- Johnson Gitau Chege as Kyalo
- Kamau Ndungu as John Waya
- Abubakar Mwenda as Dingo
- Mburu Kimani as Daddy M
- Mehul Savani as Khanji
- Maina Joseph as Kimachia
- Shix Kapienga
- Jacky Vike as Ruth

== Reception ==
The film garnered critical acclaim since its release, with particular praise for the film's direction and the cast performances.

The Hollywood Reporter's Todd McCarthy praised the film after watching it at the 2012 AFI Fest: "This dynamic crime drama comes across as fundamentally honest and vividly realistic."

Critic Jim Ross from Take One wrote a glowing review of the film, saying that "The aspirational themes are universal, but they are refracted through the rough and often brutal prism of modern Nairobi."

Ard Vijn of Screen Anarchy wrote a positive review of the film: "With its two-timing, upbeat protagonist and fast-paced tempo, Nairobi Half Life is a fun adventure to watch." And he praised Gitonga's direction by saying "That director, David 'Tosh' Gitonga is not afraid to go full tilt whenever he thinks it will benefit his film... Gitonga never lingers, never stops, but tells the story with a lot of speed and verve."

== Awards and nominations ==
At the 2014 Africa Magic Viewers Choice Awards in March 2014, Nairobi Half Life received awards for:

- Best Cinematographer (Christian Almesberger)
- Best Lighting Designer (Mohamed Zain)
- Best Make-Up Artist (Elayne Okaya) and
- Best Art Director (Barbara Minishi).

== See also ==
- List of submissions to the 85th Academy Awards for Best Foreign Language Film
- List of Kenyan submissions for the Academy Award for Best Foreign Language Film
