= Mwana FA =

Tanzanian musician and Member of Parliament

Honorable Hamis Mohammed Mwinjuma MP
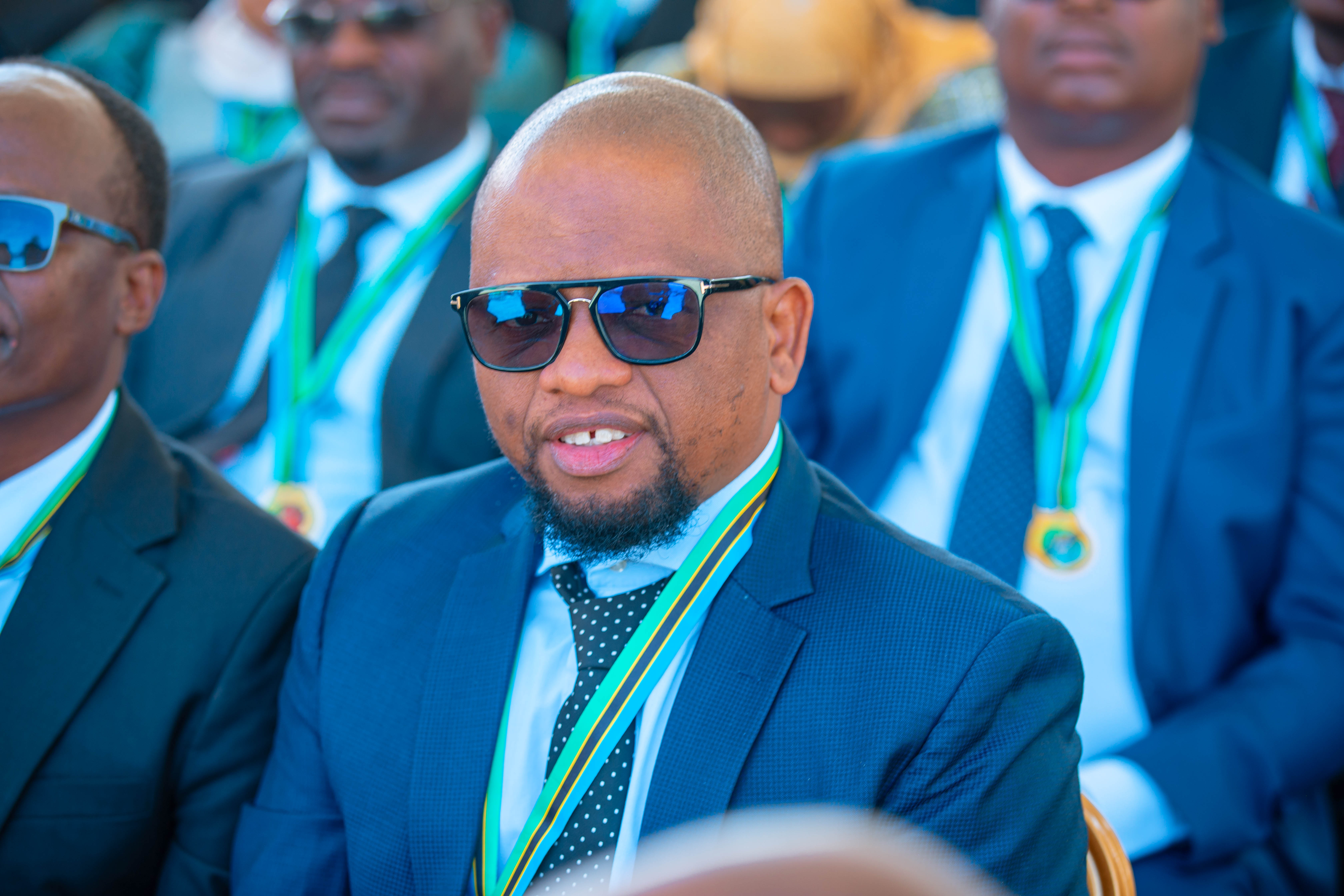

Member of Parliament
- Incumbent
- Assumed office 2020
- Preceded by: Adadi Rajabu
- Constituency: Muheza

Deputy Minister for Culture, Arts and Sports
- Incumbent
- Assumed office February 2023
- President: Samia Suluhu
- Preceded by: Pauline Gekul

Personal details
- Born: Hamis Mohammed Mwinjuma; 13 March 1980 (age 46) Muheza, Tanga Region
- Party: Chama Cha Mapinduzi
- Children: 2
- Occupation: Musician, Politician
- Awards: Kilimanjaro Music Awards
- Nickname: Mwanafalsafa

Hamis Mwinjuma, also known as (MwanaFA) is a Tanzanian musician and politician. He was a member of East Coast Team, a music group composed of Tanzanian A list artists such as A.Y and GK.

== Career ==
=== Music career ===
He is a board member of the country's National Arts Council (BASATA), and is still releasing songs and albums collaborating mostly with a former East Coast Team artist, he also has made numerous hit songs with old and new top musicians from Tanzania such as Maua Sama, Alikiba, Harmonize, Lady Jaydee and Vanessa MdeeA.Y.

=== Political career ===
Mwinjuma is a politician currently serving as a Member of Parliament representing Muheza constituency since November 2020. He was born in Muheza, Tanga Region.

=== Political career ===
Mwana Fa turned to politics in 2020, when he decided to seek nomination for member of parliament for Muheza Constituency. In February 2023 MwanaFA was appointed by Tanzanian President Samia Suluhu Hassan As The Deputy Minister For Culture, Arts And Sports
