= Electrical Trades Union =

Electrical Trades Union may refer to:

- Electrical Trades Union of Australia
- Electrical Trades Union (Ireland), now part of the Technical Engineering and Electrical Union
- Electrical Trades Union (UK), now part of Unite the Union
