= Joey Muthengi =

Kenyan media personality

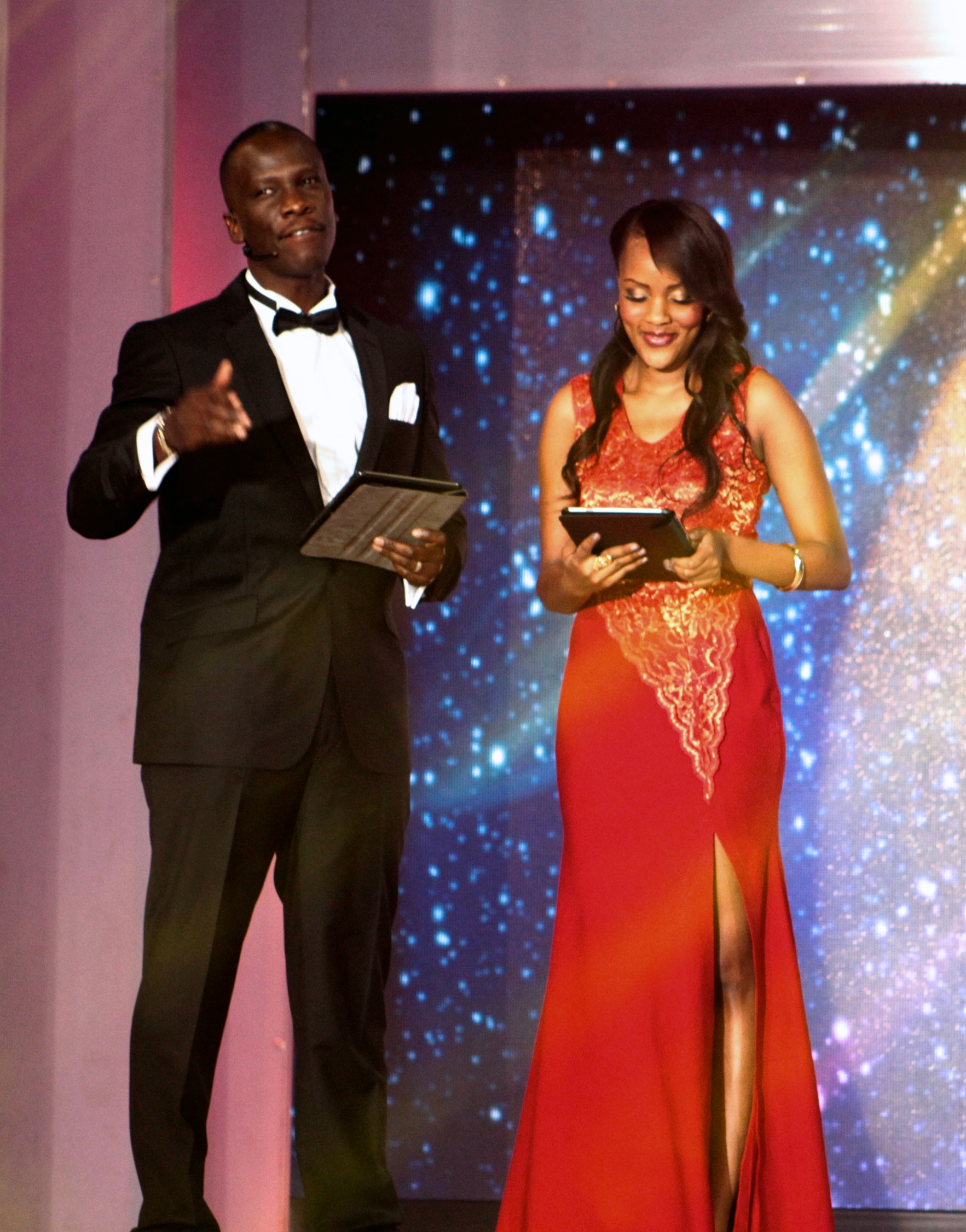
- Joey Muthengi with Tusker Project Fame Co-host Dr. Mich (left)
- Born: Kijabe, Kenya
- Occupations: TV presenter; Radio presenter; Actress
- Years active: 2009–present
- Website: www.muthengifoundation.org

Joey Muthengi is a media personality and actress. Her entry into the Kenyan media industry came through being a radio personality on 98.4 Capital FM from 2009 to 2013 where she hosted and produced the wildly popular youth show, Hits Not Homework. From 2016 to 2018, Joey Muthengi co-hosted the Power Breakfast show on Citizen TV with Fred Indimuli and Willis Raburu. She also co-hosted an entertainment show, 10 Over 10 on Citizen TV with Willis Raburu. Joey later on in 2018 quit her job at Citizen TV.

== Early life ==
Joey was born in Kijabe, Rift Valley and moved to the United States when she was 2 years old. She returned home and attended Rift Valley Academy, later moving to the USA where she attended Hope College pursuing a double major in Communications and Business Management. Joey has a brother (David Muthengi) who is in the limelight, an investment analyst, a musician and was a host at Rauka TV Show on Citizen, who is popularly known as Holy Dave.

== Career ==
Between 2011 and 2014, Joey served as the 1st ever Kenyan VJ (Video Jockey) for the South-African-based music channel Channel O where she represented Kenyan music, entertainment, and culture to the rest of the continent. In 2013 she hosted Season 6 of the largest reality music show in East Africa 'Tusker Project Fame', on Citizen TV having previously been involved with the franchise on 'Tusker All Stars' which aired in 2011. In 2015 she began hosting the daily Drivetime show on Hot 96 FM. She also hosted ‘Sugar and Spice’ on Ebru TV. Joey Muthengi worked at the Royal Media Services at Citizen TV as a 10 Over 10 co-host where she co-hosted with Willis Raburu. She left Citizen TV after landing into problems with her employer after being used by Betin, a betting company, as their brand ambassador. About one year later on her social media page, she talked about the tough times she experienced after leaving Citizen Tv, but confirmed she is in a better state and contented.

== Philanthropy ==
Joey is the co-founder and a Director of the Muthengi Foundation, a non-profit charity organization that aims to develop economic empowerment through education.

== Filmography ==
As an actress, she has been part of several local TV drama series, including the award-winning Family drama 'Changing Times' which aired on Kenya Television Network from 2010 to 2012. She was also a lead character in the drama series 'Prem' which first aired on KTN in 2013-2014 and later on Africa Magic on DSTV.

=== Television ===
year	project	role	network	notes
2012–2013	"Changing Times"		KTN	series regular
2013–2014	prem		KTN	series regular
2016	sugar and spice	host	ebru africa tv	
2016–present	power breakfast	host	Citizen tv	with fred indimuli and willis raburu
2016–Nov 2018	10 over 10	host	Citizen tv	with willis raburu
