= Janet Mbugua =

Kenyan news anchor (born 1984)

Janet Mbūgua
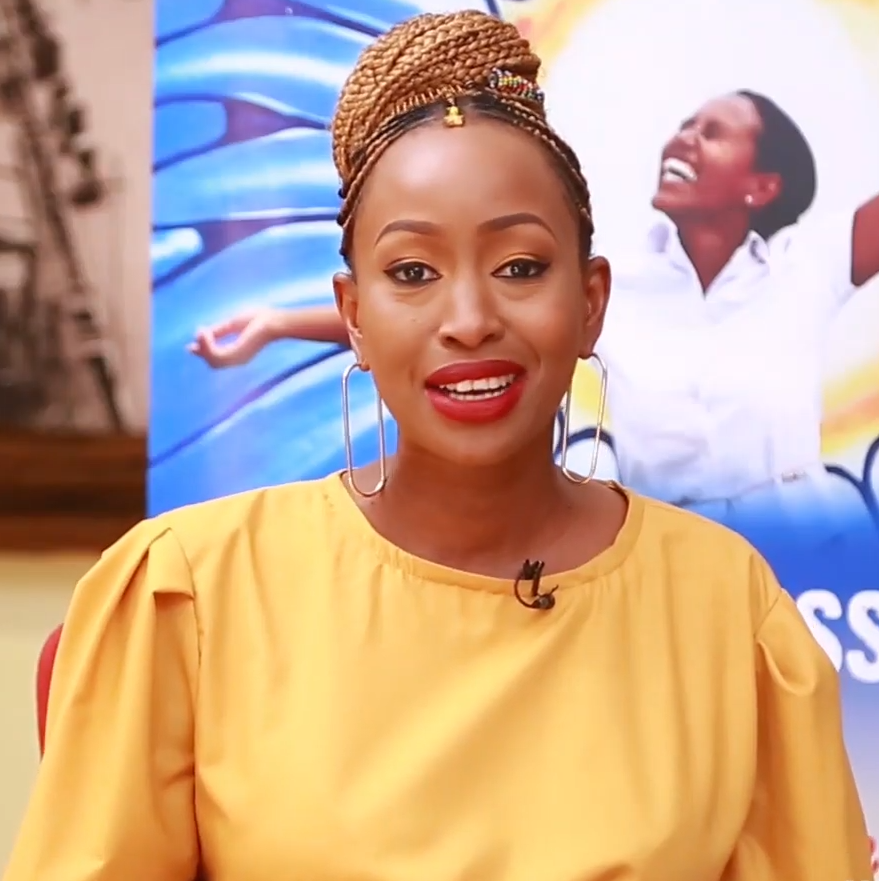
- Mbūgua in 2021
- Born: January 11, 1984 (age 42); Mombasa, Kenya
- Citizenship: Kenya
- Education: MBA in Global Business Management; BSc of Arts in Mass Communication
- Alma mater: United States International University
- Occupations: Media personality; philanthropist; actress; producer
- Years active: 2004–2017
- Spouse: Edward Ndichu (2015-2022)
- Children: 2
- Website: officialjanetmbugua.com

Janet Mbūgua (born 11 January 1984) is a Kenyan media personality, anchor, and actress. As a news anchor, she is known to have served in KTN in her earlier year of her career. She worked for Citizen TV for several years, before announcing her retirement from the media industry. She was a leading anchor at Citizen prime time news, alongside Hussein Mohammed. She takes a new role at Kenya Red Cross Humanitarian Society. Janet is interested in film and arts. As an actress she played the lead in the television series Rush.

== Early life and education ==
Janet was born on January 11, 1984, and raised in Mombasa, Kenya. She has a twin brother Timothy Mbūgua.

Janet went to Brookhouse High School and thereafter joined the United States International University (USIU).

After working for sometime, she joined the Limkokwing University of Creative Technology in Malaysia for her degree in Mass communication.

She did her MBA in Global Business Management at the Swiss Management Academy in Nairobi, Kenya.

== Career ==
In 2004, at the age of 19, Mbūgua started off her career at 98.4 Capital FM. In 2009, she was hired as a news anchor, reporter, and producer of Pan-African current affairs show, Africa 360, by e.tv in Johannesburg, South Africa. She was until recently a news anchor at Citizen TV hosting Monday Special and The Big Question.

In 2014, she starred in a sitcom, Rush. She was cast in the lead role as Pendo Adama, the owner and editor-in-chief of Rush Magazine.

In July 2017, she began consulting for The Hive, a US Based Organization seeking to amplify Gender Equality messaging in Kenya and other African countries. In 2019, she curated and hosted a TV Show dubbed Here And Now on NTV, which focused on socio-economic and political issues affecting young people.

== Humanitarian works ==
She is the founder and director of Media Avenue Limited, where persons are provided with services such as public speaking, moderating, and Emceeing. She has also reinforced the empowerment of young females with the Inua Dada campaign that is endorsed by Kenya's first lady, Margaret Kenyatta. On 8 October 2021, she launched The Inua Dada Centre at Korogocho slum in Nairobi. The centre is a space that provides access to information and awareness on reproductive health and rights.

== Personal life ==
Janet Mbūgua is married to Edward Ndichū. Together they have two sons, Ethan Hūrū Ndichū born in October 2015 and Mali Ndichū. In 2019, Janet released her first book, ‘My First Time’, a collection of short stories from women, girls and men on their first interaction with menstruation.

== Filmography ==
- Rush – Pendo Adama
