= Esther Nabaasa =

Ugandan songwriter

- Born: Esther Nabaasa Mugizi; Mbarara Uganda
- Genres: Pop; R&B; soul; pop rock
- Occupations: Songwriter, musician, record producer
- Instrument: Vocals
- Years active: 2008–present

Esther (or Estar) Nabaasa Mugizi, commonly known as Esther Nabaasa, is a Ugandan songwriter and record producer. She was the winner of the second season of the East Africa's Tusker Project Fame (TPF) singing competition in 2008.

== Career ==
At the age of 21, Esther Nabaasa auditioned for the east African singing competition Tusker Project Fame in Kampala and won and then represented Uganda in the Tusker Project Fame Academy in Nairobi Kenya. She survived weekly evictions during the live stage performances until she emerged the winner, becoming the first Ugandan to win on the Tusker Project Fame stage and any singing competition outside Uganda. She was awarded a recording deal with South African-based Galo records and a five million Kenyan shillings prize. She released her debut 11 track album called Rock in the Country Soul in 2009. The album was recorded at Master Mixx Studio, a subsidiary of the Galo Records in Johannesburg South Africa under the Tusker Project Fame deal she had won in 2007. She released her second album in 2013. She then started writing and producing songs for other artist.

She, together with Barbara Kayaga, Hum Kay, Ruyonga and Richard Kaweesa wrote and sang Yoga Yoga for the celebration of Uganda's jubilee independence in 2012. The writing of the song was however attributed to Richard Kaweesa leaving Esther who owned 31% of the song and the others with only singing credits. Nile Breweries also commissioned Esther and Kaweesa to write another song Sip from the Nile that same year, also for the jubilee celebration.

Her other writing credits are on Bebe Cool's 2014 album Go Mama, "I'm Still Here" and other songs from Juliana's album Bits and Pieces and a number of songs on Gabriel K's debut and second albums in 2018 and 2019 respectively. In 2018, she wrote and produced music for Natasha Karugire's war historical film 27 Guns, singing some of the songs.

Nabaasa also appeared on other reality singing competitions such as Coca-Cola Rated Next season three as a judge alongside Siima Sabiiti.

== Discography ==
=== Singles ===
- Reaching Out
- Yog Yoga
- Watwala Omutima Gwange
- Sip from the Nile

== Albums ==
- Rock in the Country Soul 2009
- Untitled 2013
