= Etu =

Ceremonial boxing practiced on the Indonesian

The map location of the Nagakeo Region where Etu is practiced

Etu is a traditional form of ceremonial boxing practiced on the Indonesian island of Flores.

The fighters use boxing gloves made of bamboo craftings called kepo, and they are only allowed to hit with one of their hands wrapped with a kepo. The other unwrapped hand is used to deflect enemies' blows.

== The Practice ==
The similarity of Etu and conventional boxing is that it is done inside an arena in the center of the village. It is also a fight between two fighters. There are no precise rules such as how many rounds the fighters have to complete. The Etu fight will be stopped if one of the fighters has fallen or shed blood. Each fight in this form of ceremonial boxing can usually go on for five minutes, depending on each of the fighters' strength.

== Officials ==
The referees are called Seka. There are usually 3 sekas in the game. Besides referees, there are also officials known as sike whose job is to control the fighters from beating their opponents excessively. The Sikes can easily control the fighters by pulling the cloth that the fighters wear around their waist.

There are also officials called pai etu or bobo etu. These officials are 3-4 men whose job is to find the next fighters to fight among men who are watching around the arena. Those who intend to join the Etu can also directly report to the pai etu and they will set a fighting schedule for them. Another official is called the ceremony guard or mandor adat whose job is to make sure that no one outside the arena can interfere the fight going on in the arena.

Women are also involved in the ceremony. However, they do not join in the etu fight but they are involved in the dio, a musical group to support the fighters.

== Beliefs ==
Every time after finishing a fight, the fighters embrace each other as a symbol of brotherhood and sportsmanship. They are strongly forbidden to bear vengeance and fight outside the arena after the etu. Otherwise, people believe that they will be struck with bad luck and catastrophe. People also believe that the wounds of the fighters can be easily healed. The wounded ones are directly delivered to the head of the tribe, with one touch of medication, the fighters' wounds' can magically be healed.
