= Vitimbi =

- Genre: Comedy show
- Starring: Benson Wanjau; Mary Khavere
- Country of origin: Kenya
- Original language: Kiswahili

Production
- Production location: Nairobi

Original release
- Network: KBC
- Release: 1985 – 2014

Vitimbi is a Kenyan television comedy show that premiered in 1985 on Kenya Broadcasting Corporation, then known as Voice of Kenya. It revolves around the family of Mzee Ojwang and his wife Mama Kayai as they experience challenges of managing a restaurant.

== Overview ==
The term 'vitimbi' can be translated from Kiswahili to mean "machinations," "intrigues," or "drama". Popular actors and actresses include the late Benson Wanjau alias Mzee Ojwang Hatari, Mary Khavere alias Mama Kayai as Mzee Ojwang's wife, Davis Mwambili alias Mwala and Julius Nyambegere alias Mogaka. Over the years, the show has won numerous awards for its ability to both entertain and educate Kenyans on various social issues. Kenya's second president was particularly fond of the show and the actors were regularly invited to perform during national celebrations. The show was controversially cancelled in 2014, after airing for more than 30 years, because the actors were deemed "too old". The plan was initially to revamp the show by introducing new and younger actors who would take on the roles of characters such as Mzee Ojwang and Mama Kayai. However, the show was ultimately pulled off air. The show returned to KBC in 2022, with some new talents. The new cast includes Hussein Yussuf commonly called Bahali Yake Mwenyewe and Scolly Cheruto as Chemasunde and Mary Nzula Munyao as Regina Katunge and Hussein Yussuf commonly known as Bahali Yake Mwenyewe.
