= Ernest Ugeziwe =

Rwandan media personality (born 1990)

Ernesto Ugeziwe
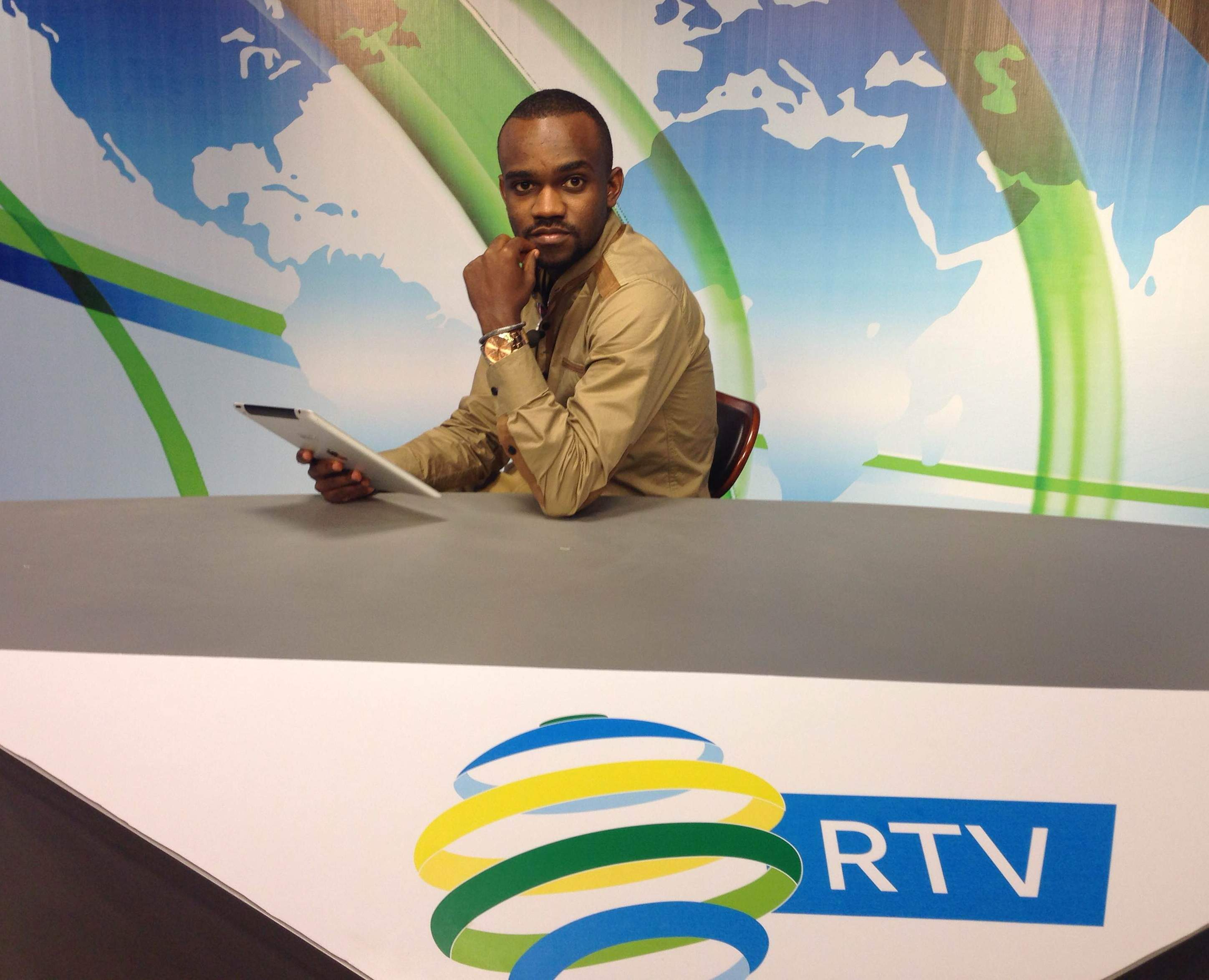
- Born: Ernest Ugeziwe Murindangabo; 35–36; Kigali, Rwanda
- Occupations: Music Executive, Media
- Years active: 2009 - present
- Television: Afrohub Music

Ernesto Ugeziwe (born 23 July 1990) is a Rwandan media personality, journalist, and music executive known for his leadership in the entertainment industry. As the head of AfroHub Music, A premier East African booking Agency. He has played a key role in promoting East African music and culture, organizing major events, and bridging artists with global opportunities. With a background in communication and media, Ernesto has worked with platforms like Rwanda Television. (RTV) and the Washington-based Voice of America (VOA). His influence extends to major cultural events and festivals making him a significant figure in the African music scene.

== Early years ==
He was born on 23 July 1990 in Nyarugenge, Kigali City, Rwanda, and grew up in Western province of the country with his family after the 1994 Genocide against the Tutsi. He completed his university studies at Kigali Independent University with a degree in science and technology. As a child his dream was to become an actor, he was part of Boy Scouts and drama teams when he was in high school.

== Career ==
He began his media career in 2011 on a community radio station in Rwanda’s Western Province, where he hosted entertainment shows while completing his university studies. In 2012, he transitioned to Flash FM, presenting entertainment and showbiz programs.

The following year, he joined Magic FM as an entertainment presenter and program producer, focusing on youth-oriented content. His television career includes hosting shows like RTV Mag and YoHits on Rwanda Television. (RTV), under Rwanda Broadcasting Agency. In 2013, Ugeziwe also served as the Media and Communication Chief for East African Promoters, an event company organizing major concerts in the East Africa.

In 2016, he moved to the United States to pursue a master’s degree in media and communication. He later joined Voice of America (VOA) in Washington, D.C., contributing to evening showbiz programs and news broadcasts. In addition to his media career, Ugeziwe is the founder of Afrohub Music. AfroHub Music is an entertainment company dedicated to promoting African music, culture, and talent on a global scale. It is known for organizing major concerts and cultural events. It serves as a bridge between African musicians and the diaspora, creating opportunities for collaboration and artistic growth in the global music industry.

Throughout his career, Ugeziwe has been recognized for his insights into East African music and show business, making significant contributions to the promotion of African culture and entertainment both in Rwanda and internationally.

== Awards ==
Ugeziwe's TV show, RTV Mag, was judged the best TV show of the year 2014/2015 by Rwanda Broadcasting Agency.

== Other activities ==
In 2013, Ernesto Ugeziwe served as the Media and Communication Chief for East African Promoters (EAP), a leading event management company in Rwanda. During his tenure, he played a key role in organizing major concerts featuring international artists and overseeing the Primus Guma Guma Super Star (PGGSS) competition, an annual talent show that showcased Rwanda’s top emerging musicians.

In 2015, Ugeziwe worked on a promotional show for Tigo Rwanda, a major telecommunications company, before relocating to the United States to further his education.

Beyond journalism, Ugeziwe has been instrumental in promoting Rwandan culture and African music worldwide. He has organized and participated in several high-profile cultural and entertainment events, including:

• Rwanda Day in Washington, D.C. – A gathering of Rwandans in the diaspora, celebrating national achievements and fostering business connections.

• Madaraka Festival (10th Edition) – He played a pivotal role in expanding this pan-African music and arts festival to various U.S. cities, bridging African artists with global audiences.

• Made in Rwanda Weekend – An annual festival celebrating Rwandan craftsmanship, business, and entertainment, connecting the North American diaspora with Rwanda.

Ugeziwe continues to be a leading figure in African media, event production, and cultural advocacy, using his platform Afrohub Music to elevate Rwandan and African music, entertainment, and business opportunities worldwide.
