= Vioja Mahakamani =

Vioja Mahakamani is a Kenyan comedy series and one of the country's most popular television shows. The show has been broadcast for over 35 years. The series can be viewed on Kenya Broadcasting Corporation.
