= Tusker Project Fame =

- Presented by: Sheila Mwanyigha; Mitch Egwang; Joey Muthengi; Gaetano Kagwa
- Judges: Ian Mbugua; Juliana Kanyomozi; Hermes Joachim
- Country of origin: Kenya
- Original language: English
- No. of seasons: 6

Production
- Running time: 38—46 minutes

Original release
- Release: 1 October 2006 – 8 December 2013

Related
- Tusker Twende Kazi; Tusker Twende Kazi East Africa's Got Talent

Tusker Project Fame is an East African reality-singing competition show sponsored by Tusker Lager. The show, similar to American Idol and Project Fame South Africa, featured musicians competing for a cash prize and a one-year record deal with Universal Music Group South Africa.

Tusker Project Fame aired six seasons between 2006 and 2013. To be eligible, participants had to be at least 21 years old and be able to sing and perform, or sing and play an instrument.

== Controversy ==
Past winners criticized the show's organizers for failing to fulfill their promises, claiming that while the Tusker Company profited significantly from the program, it did not adequately support winners once the season ended.

== Past Project Fame Winners ==
| Season | Winner | Country | Host(s) |
|---|---|---|---|
| 1 | Valerie Kimani | Kenya | Gaetano Kagwa |
| 2 | Esther Mugizi | Uganda | Gaetano Kagwa |
| 3 | Alpha Rwirangira | Rwanda | Sheila Mwanyigha, Mitchy Egwang |
| 4 | Hillary Davis Ntare | Uganda | Sheila Mwanyigha, Mitchy Egwang |
| TPF All Stars | Alpha Rwirangira | Rwanda | Gaetano Kagwa |
| 5 | Ruth Matete | Kenya | Sheila Mwanyigha, Mitchy Egwang |
| 6 | Hope Irakoze | Burundi | Mitchy Egwang, Joey Muthengi |

== Contestants ==
=== Season 1 ===
| Contestant | Country |
|---|---|
| Valerie Kimani | Kenya |

=== Season 2 ===
| Contestant | Country |
|---|---|
| Esther Mugizi | Uganda |

=== Season 3 ===
| Contestant | Country |
|---|---|
| Alpha Rwirangira | Rwanda |

=== Season 6 ===
| Contestant | Country |
|---|---|
| Jenifer | Kenya |
| Nyambura | Kenya |
| Amos & Josh | Kenya |
| Michel | Kenya |
| Fess | Kenya |
| Undercover Brothers Ug | Uganda |
| Sitenda | Uganda |
| Derrick Kojjo | Uganda |
| Daisy Ejang | Uganda |
| Hope | Burundi |
| Kissy | South Sudan |
| Patrick | Rwanda |
| Phiona | Rwanda |
| Peace | Rwanda |
| Angel | Tanzania |
| Hisia | Tanzania |
| Tanah | Tanzania |
| Dubson | Tanzania |
