= Eckernforde Tanga University =

Private university in Tanzania

- Chuo Kikuu cha Eckernforde Tanga (Swahili)
- Motto: Academic and Professional Excellence
- Type: Private
- Established: 2010; 16 years ago
- Location: Tanga, Tanzania
- Website: University website

Eckernforde Tanga University (ETU) is a private university in Tanga, Tanzania.
