= The Voice Gerações season 4 =

The Voice Gerações
- Season 4
- Promotional poster featuring coaches Ralph, João, Liz, and Carreira
- Hosted by: Catarina Furtado; Maria Petronilho (backstage host)
- Coaches: Marisa Liz; Mickael Carreira; Gisela João; Anselmo Ralph
- Winner: Os En'Canta Modas
- Winning coach: Marisa Liz
- Runners-up: Hey T Rumo Certo; Mizaela & Linne

Release
- Original network: RTP1
- Original release: 12 July – 20 September 2026

Season chronology
- ← Previous; Season 3

The fourth season of The Voice Gerações premiered on 12 July 2026 on RTP1. In this spinoff, family or friend groups, consisting of singers of all ages, compete. Marisa Liz, Mickael Carreira, Gisela João, and Anselmo Ralph all returned as coaches from the previous season.

Catarina Furtado and Maria Petronilho both returned as host and backstage host, respectively.

On 20 September, Os En'Canta Modas from Team Marisa was announced as the winner, marking Marisa Liz's first win on The Voice Gerações. With Os En'Canta Modas' win, Liz expanded her status as the most winning coach on all versions of The Voice Portugal, with five wins total, adding her four wins on the main version of the show.

== Coaches ==
On 26 June 2026, it was confirmed that all four coaches from the coaches from the third season would return for the upcoming fourth season; Mickael Carreira and Anselmo Ralph both returned for their fourth seasons each, while Marisa Liz and Gisela João both returned for their second seasons each.

Coaches of The Voice Gerações season 4

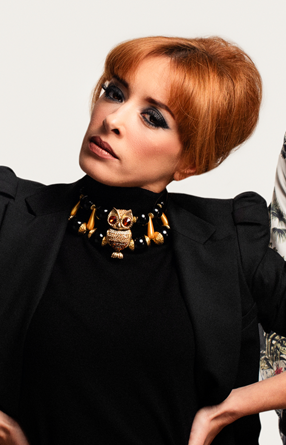
Marisa Liz

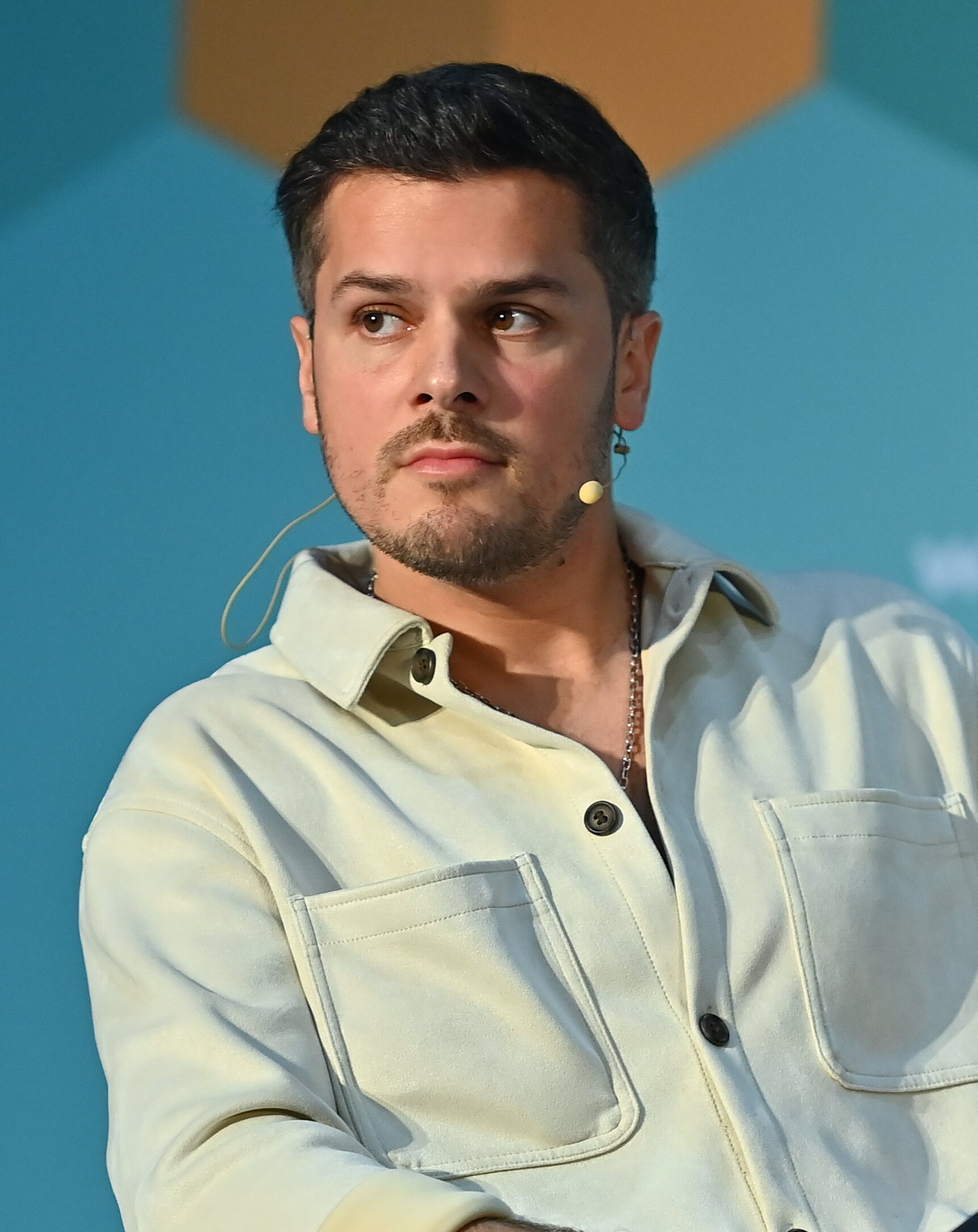
Mickael Carreira

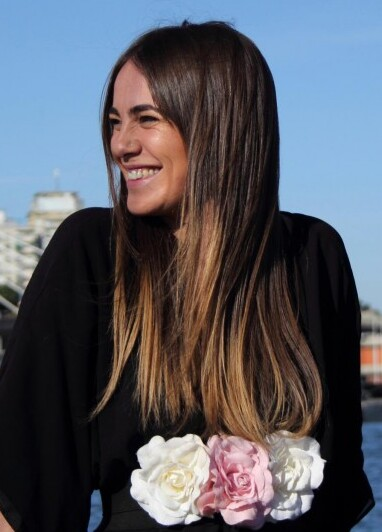
Gisela João

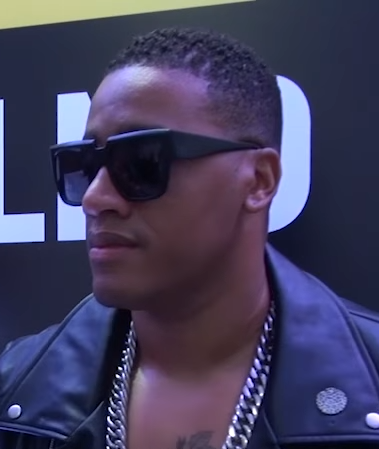
Anselmo Ralph

== Teams ==
- Winner
- Runner-up
- Eliminated in the Grand final
- Eliminated in the Semifinal
- Eliminated in the Knockouts

Coaches	Top 32 Groups			
Marisa Liz				
Marisa Liz	Os En'Canta Modas	Cantate Iubilo	Artéria	Irina & Maria Inês
Marisa Liz	Joana & Jean	Leonor, Eva & João	Família Rodrigues da Costa	Sarah & Noah
Mickael Carreira				
Mickael Carreira	Rumo Certo	Lola & Os Mayer	Coro Caminhada	Diogo & Leonor
Mickael Carreira	Família Brito	Sandra & Paulo	Diogo, Marco & Amigo	Os Estrelinhas
Gisela João				
Gisela João	Hey T	Lair & Pedro Bellô	100 Drama	Andreia & Aida
Gisela João	Patrícia & Benedita	Rodrigo & Gonçalo	Catarina & Rafael	Francisco & Joana
Anselmo Ralph				
Anselmo Ralph	Mizaela & Linne	Bea & Matilde	Break Even	Matilde & Mickael Lopes
Anselmo Ralph	Notas a Quatro	Rebecca & Rodrigo Di Giorgio	Beatriz & Nuno	Soul Sisters

== Blind Auditions ==
In the blind auditions, each coach has 8 spots to fill on their respective team. Each coach receives two blocks to use against another coach which effectively prevents that coach from getting the artist. This season, in addition to the blocks, each coach received a "mega block" to give to one artist. The mega block defaults the recipient to that coach's team, blocking all other coaches that turned. At the end of the auditions, Marisa Liz and Gisela João did not use their second blocks.

✔	Coach pressed the "EU QUERO" button
	Artists joined this coach's team
	Artists eliminated as no coach pressed the "EU QUERO" button
✘	All coaches are blocked by a coach who pressed the "mega block" button
✘	Coach pressed the button "EU QUERO", but was:
	Blocked by Marisa Blocked by Mickael Blocked by Gisela Blocked by Anselmo

=== Episode 1 (12 July) ===
During the episode, Ágata surprised the coaches singing "Macaco Nú", receiving a four-chair-turn.

Order	Group	Song	Coach's and artist's choices			
Order	Group	Song	Marisa	Mickael	Gisela	Anselmo
1	100 Drama	"Seasons of Love"	✔	✔	✔	✔
2	Rebecca & Rodrigo Di Giorgio	"Stayin' Alive"	✘	✘	—	✔
3	Os En'Canta Modas	"Meus Senhores"	✔	✔	—	✔
4	Liliana & Helena	"Onde Vais"	—	—	—	—
5	Francisco & Joana	"Until I Found You"	✘	✘	✔	✘
6	Cantigas na Eira	"O Dia da Espiga"	—	—	—	—
7	Família Brito	"Grito"	✘	✔	—	—
8	Rumo Certo	"Amigos Coloridos"	—	✔	—	—
9	Vera & Matilde	"Tens os Olhos de Deus"	—	—	—	—
10	Rodrigo & João	"Rosa Albardeira"	—	—	—	—
11	Leonor, Eva & João	"Guarda-me Esta Noite"	✔	✘	✘	✘

=== Episode 2 (26 July) ===
Order	Group	Song	Coach's and artist's choices			
Order	Group	Song	Marisa	Mickael	Gisela	Anselmo
1	Mountain Valley	"Vida Paralela"	—	—	—	—
2	Mizaela & Linne	"Happier"	✔	✔	✔	✔
3	Matilde & Mickael Lopes	"Andorinhas"	—	—	—	✔
4	Sérgio & Laura	"You Are the Reason"	—	—	—	—
5	Hey T	"Creep"	—	—	✔	✔
6	Sarah & Noah	"A Thousand Years"	✔	—	—	—
7	Marisa & Francisco	"Sorte Grande"	—	—	—	—
8	Artéria	"Já Sei Namorar"	✔	✘	✔	—
9	Catarina & Rafael	"Laurindinha"	—	—	✔	—
10	Inês & Rui	"The Loneliest"	—	—	—	—
11	Os Estrelinhas	"Tu Na Tua"	✔	✔	✔	✔

=== Episode 3 (2 August) ===
Order	Group	Song	Coach's and artist's choices			
Order	Group	Song	Marisa	Mickael	Gisela	Anselmo
1	Irina & Maria Inês	"Anyone"	✔	✔	✔	✔
2	Rodrigo & Gonçalo	"Ouvi Dizer"	—	—	✔	—
3	Maria & Miguel	"Loucos de Lisboa"	—	—	—	—
4	Break Even	"Dream On"	—	✘	—	✔
5	Nelson & Inês	"Amor Antigo"	—	—	—	—
6	Diogo & Leonor	"Sol de Inverno"	—	✔	—	—
7	Maria, Francisca & Pilar	"portas do sol"	—	—	—	—
8	Soul Sisters	"I Say a Little Prayer"	—	—	—	✔
9	Patrícia & Benedita	"Contigo"	—	✔	✔	✔
10	Daniela & Cláudio	"(Everything I Do) I Do It for You"	—	—	—	—
11	Lola & Os Mayer	"Blackbird"	✘	✔	✘	—

=== Episode 4 (9 August) ===
Order	Group	Song	Coach's and artist's choices			
Order	Group	Song	Marisa	Mickael	Gisela	Anselmo
1	Andreia e Vânia	"Antes Que Digas Adeus"	—	—	—	—
2	Notas a Quatro	"Eu Sei que Vou Te Amar"	—	—	—	✔
3	Joana & Jean	"Can't Take My Eyes Off You"	✔	—	✔	—
4	Ser Contraste	"Brincando Com o Fogo"	—	—	—	—
5	Bea & Matilde	"Foste Embora"	✘	✘	✘	✔
6	Sara & Alice	"A Million Dreams"	—	—	—	—
7	Andreia & Aida	"Anda Comigo Ver Os Aviões"	—	—	✔	✔
8	Ana, David & João Gaspar	"Can't Help Falling In Love"	—	—	—	—
9	Sandra & Paulo	"I Belong to You"	—	✔	—	—
10	Joana & Margarida	"Oceans (Where Feet May Fail)"	—	—	—	—
11	Cantate Iubilo	"Lovely"	✔	✔	✔	✔

=== Episode 5 (16 August) ===
Order	Group	Song	Coach's and artist's choices			
Order	Group	Song	Marisa	Mickael	Gisela	Anselmo
1	Diogo, Marco & Amigo	"Bota Fogo no Terreiro"	—	✔	—	✔
2	Beatriz & Nuno	"Deslocado"	—	—	—	✔
3	Maria & Madalena	"Broken Strings"	—	—	—	Team full
4	Lair & Pedro Bellô	"Pétala"	—	✘	✔	Team full
5	Daniela, Maria & Matilde	"Um Dia Hei de Voltar"	—	—	Team full	Team full
6	Yara & Lucas Laffer	"Skyfall"	—	—	Team full	Team full
7	Família Rodrigues da Costa	"Eu Gosto de Ti"	✔	—	Team full	Team full
8	Catarina & Carla	"Imagine"	Team full	—	Team full	Team full
9	Coro Caminhada	"O Tempo Vai Esperar"	Team full	✔	Team full	Team full

== Knockouts ==
The knockouts (called tira-teimas in Portuguese) aired on 23 and 30 August. In this stage, each coach's groups perform for a spot in the semifinal. Four groups per team perform each episode. Each coach takes a total of six groups to the semifinal. However, this season, a new feature was introduced. Dubbed the "Verdict Room" (Sala de Veredicto in Portuguese), the feature allows each coach to put one group from the first episode of the round in a waiting hold to be reviewed at the at end of the round, to determine if they will take the place of a group in the second episode of the round. A total of twenty-four groups advance to the semifinal.

Knockouts colour key
Group was selected by their coach to advance to the semifinal
Group was originally placed in the "Verdict Room" but was selected by their coach to advance at the end of the round
Group was originally placed in the "Verdict Room" but was eliminated at the conclusion of the round
Group lost and was eliminated

=== Episode 6 (23 August) ===
Sixth episode's results
Order	Coach	Group	Song	Result
1	Mickael Carreira	Lola & Os Mayer	"Unholy"	Advanced
2	Mickael Carreira	Sandra & Paulo	"O Teu Nome"	Advanced
3	Mickael Carreira	Os Estrelinhas	"Ficar Óai"	Eliminated
4	Mickael Carreira	Leonor & Diogo	"Que o Amor Te Salve Nesta Noite Escura"	Advanced
5	Marisa Liz	Cantate Iubilo	"Bohemian Rhapsody"	Advanced
6	Marisa Liz	Irina & Maria Inês	"Feeling Good"	Advanced
7	Marisa Liz	Família Rodrigues da Costa	"O Amor É Assim"	Eliminated
8	Marisa Liz	Sarah & Noah	"Perfect"	Eliminated
9	Gisela João	Lair & Pedro Bellô	"Você Não Me Ensinou a Te Esquecer"	Advanced
10	Gisela João	Catarina & Rafael	"Valentim"	Eliminated
11	Gisela João	100 Drama	"This Is Me"	Advanced
12	Gisela João	Rodrigo & Gonçalo	"Flor Sem Tempo"	Advanced
13	Anselmo Ralph	Soul Sisters	"Killing Me Softly with His Song"	Eliminated
14	Anselmo Ralph	Matilde & Mickael Lopes	"Maravilhoso Coração"	Advanced
15	Anselmo Ralph	Bea & Matilde	"Jealous"	Advanced
16	Anselmo Ralph	Notas a Quatro	"(I've Had) The Time of My Life"	Advanced

=== Episode 7 (30 August) ===
Seventh episode's results
Order	Coach	Group	Song	Result
1	Marisa Liz	Os En'Canta Modas	"Hino dos Mineiros"	Advanced
2	Marisa Liz	Artéria	"Mas que nada"	Advanced
3	Marisa Liz	Joana & Jean	"Follow the Sun"	Advanced
4	Marisa Liz	Leonor, Eva & João	"Olá, Solidão"	Advanced
5	Anselmo Ralph	Break Even	"Runaway Baby"	Advanced
6	Anselmo Ralph	Rebecca & Rodrigo Di Giorgio	"We've Got Tonight"	Advanced
7	Anselmo Ralph	Beatriz & Nuno	"Antes Dela Dizer Que Sim"	Eliminated
8	Anselmo Ralph	Mizaela & Linne	"Always Remember Us This Way"	Advanced
9	Gisela João	Patrícia & Benedita	"Se Eu"	Advanced
10	Gisela João	Andreia & Aida	"Risk It All"	Advanced
11	Gisela João	Francisco & Joana	"É Isso Aí"	Eliminated
12	Gisela João	Hey T	"Respirar"	Advanced
13	Mickael Carreira	Coro Caminhada	"Rosa"	Advanced
14	Mickael Carreira	Família Brito	"Ai coração"	Advanced
15	Mickael Carreira	Rumo Certo	"Amanhã"	Advanced
16	Mickael Carreira	Diogo, Marco & Amigo	"Dá Cá Um Beijo"	Eliminated

== Semifinals ==
This season, the semifinals are pre-recorded with coaches selecting which group from his/her team will advance to the live final. Three groups per team each semifinal episode perform, with one advancing from their respective team to the final in each of the two episodes.

Semifinals colour key
Group saved by their coach and advanced to the live final
Group was eliminated

=== Episode 8: Semifinal 1 (6 September) ===
Eighth episode's results
Order	Coach	Group	Song	Result
1	Marisa Liz	Irina & Maria Inês	"Respect"	Eliminated
2	Marisa Liz	Os En'Canta Modas	"Já Lá Vem No Alto Mar"	Safe
3	Marisa Liz	Joana & Jean	"Take Me to Church"	Eliminated
4	Mickael Carreira	Coro Caminhada	"Gaivota"	Eliminated
5	Mickael Carreira	Família Brito	"Há Dias Assim"	Eliminated
6	Mickael Carreira	Rumo Certo	"O Meu Nome É Saudade"	Safe
7	Gisela João	Andreia & Aida	"Lay Me Down"	Eliminated
8	Gisela João	Rodrigo & Gonçalo	"Estou Além"	Eliminated
9	Gisela João	Hey T	"Desfolhada portuguesa"	Safe
10	Anselmo Ralph	Rebecca & Rodrigo Di Giorgio	"Karma Chameleon"	Eliminated
11	Anselmo Ralph	Break Even	"Chameleon"	Eliminated
12	Anselmo Ralph	Bea & Matilde	"Primavera"	Safe

=== Episode 9: Semifinal 2 (13 September) ===
Ninth episode's results
Order	Coach	Group	Song	Result
1	Mickael Carreira	Diogo & Leonor	"Por Mim"	Eliminated
2	Mickael Carreira	Lola & Os Mayer	"Your Song"	Safe
3	Mickael Carreira	Sandra & Paulo	"Quero Voltar Para Os Braços Da Minha Mãe"	Eliminated
4	Anselmo Ralph	Notas a Quatro	"Somewhere Over the Rainbow"	Eliminated
5	Anselmo Ralph	Matilde & Mikael Lopes	"Rapariga"	Eliminated
6	Anselmo Ralph	Mizaela & Linne	"Hallelujah"	Safe
7	Marisa Liz	Artéria	"The Only Exception"	Eliminated
8	Marisa Liz	Leonor, Eva & João	"A Terra Gira"	Eliminated
9	Marisa Liz	Cantate Iubilo	"Casa"	Safe
10	Gisela João	Patrícia & Benedita	"Quero É Viver"	Eliminated
11	Gisela João	Lair & Pedro Bellô	"Sonho"	Safe
12	Gisela João	100 Drama	"Somebody to Love"	Eliminated

== Live final ==
The live final commenced on 20 September 2026. In the first round, the final eight groups perform for one spot on their respective team to qualify for the second round based on the public's vote. In the second round, the top four groups perform their blind audition songs with one being declared the winner of the season at the end of the episode.

At the end of the show, Os En'Canta Modas from Team Marisa won the season, marking Marisa Liz's first win as a coach on The Voice Gerações. In addition to Liz's four wins on the main version of the show, she expanded her status as the most winning coach on all versions of The Voice Portugal, with five wins total.

Final colour key round one
Group saved by the public and advanced to round two
Group was eliminated

Final colour key round two
Group finished as the winner of the season
Group finished as a runner-up of the season

=== Episode 10 (20 September) ===
Final results
Round	Order	Coach	Group	Song	Result
First (Top 8)	1	Mickael Carreira	Rumo Certo	"Perdidamente"	Finalist
First (Top 8)	2	Anselmo Ralph	Mizaela & Linne	"Love in the Dark"	Finalist
First (Top 8)	3	Marisa Liz	Cantate Iubilo	"Eu Sei…"	Eliminated
First (Top 8)	4	Mickael Carreira	Lola & Os Mayer	"Sweet Child o' Mine"	Eliminated
First (Top 8)	5	Gisela João	Hey T	"Canção do Mar"	Finalist
First (Top 8)	6	Anselmo Ralph	Bea & Matilde	"Onde Vais"	Eliminated
First (Top 8)	7	Marisa Liz	Os En'Canta Modas	"Querido Alentejo"	Finalist
First (Top 8)	8	Gisela João	Lair & Pedro Bellô	"A Rosa Desfolhada"	Eliminated
Second (Top 4)	1	Anselmo Ralph	Mizaela & Linne	"Happier"	Runner-up
Second (Top 4)	2	Gisela João	Hey T	"Creep"	Runner-up
Second (Top 4)	3	Mickael Carreira	Rumo Certo	"Amigos Coloridos"	Runner-up
Second (Top 4)	4	Marisa Liz	Os En'Canta Modas	"Meus Senhores"	Winner

== Elimination chart ==
Teams colour key

- Team Marisa
- Team Mickael
- Team Gisela
- Team Anselmo

Results colour key

- Winner
- Runner-up
- Safe
- Eliminated

Results per week
Group	Week 1	Week 2	Week 3	
Group	Week 1	Week 2	Round 1	Round 2
Os En'Canta Modas	Safe	—N/a	Safe	Winner
Hey T	Safe	—N/a	Safe	Runner-up
Rumo Certo	Safe	—N/a	Safe	Runner-up
Mizaela & Linne	—N/a	Safe	Safe	Runner-up
Cantate Iubilo	—N/a	Safe	Eliminated	
Lola & Os Mayer	—N/a	Safe	Eliminated	
Lair & Pedro Bellô	—N/a	Safe	Eliminated	
Bea & Matilde	Safe	—N/a	Eliminated	
Artéria	—N/a	Eliminated		
Leonor, Eva & João	—N/a	Eliminated		
Diogo & Leonor	—N/a	Eliminated		
Sandra & Paulo	—N/a	Eliminated		
100 Drama	—N/a	Eliminated		
Patrícia & Benedita	—N/a	Eliminated		
Matilde & Mikael Lopes	—N/a	Eliminated		
Notas a Quatro	—N/a	Eliminated		
Irina & Maria Inês	Eliminated			
Joana & Jean	Eliminated			
Coro Caminhada	Eliminated			
Família Brito	Eliminated			
Andreia & Aida	Eliminated			
Rodrigo & Gonçalo	Eliminated			
Break Even	Eliminated			
Rebecca & Rodrigo Di Giorgio	Eliminated			
