= The Voice Gerações season 3 =

The Voice Gerações
- Season 3
- Hosted by: Catarina Furtado; Maria Petronilho (backstage host)
- Coaches: Mickael Carreira; Marisa Liz; Gisela João; Anselmo Ralph
- Winner: D'Anto
- Winning coach: Gisela João
- Runners-up: Cândido & Pedro; Falta Um; Raquel, Olinda & Margarida

Release
- Original network: RTP1
- Original release: 20 July – 24 August 2025

The third season of The Voice Gerações premiered on 20 July 2025 on RTP1. In this spinoff, family or friend groups, consisting of singers of all ages, compete. The coaches for the season consist of returning coaches Mickael Carreira and Anselmo Ralph, former The Voice and The Voice Kids coach Marisa Liz, and debuting coach Gisela João.

Catarina Furtado returned as the host of the program, while Maria Petronilho served as the backstage host.

On 24 August, D'Anto from Team Gisela was announced as the winner, marking Gisela João's first win as a coach. With D'Anto's win, João became the sixth coach on all variations of the Portuguese version of The Voice to win on his/her debut season following Ralph and António Zambujo on the main version and Fernando Daniel, Nininho Vaz Maia, and Miguel Cristovinho on the kids version; however, João became the first female coach in the show's history to accomplish this.

== Coaches ==
In March 2025, it was confirmed that of the coaches from the second season, only Mickael Carreira and Anselmo Ralph would return. At the same time, it was confirmed that Marisa Liz, who previously served as a coach on the adult and kid versions of the show, would join the panel, replacing Simone de Oliveira. Debutant Gisela João was confirmed to join the panel, replacing Sara Correia.

Coaches of The Voice Gerações season 3

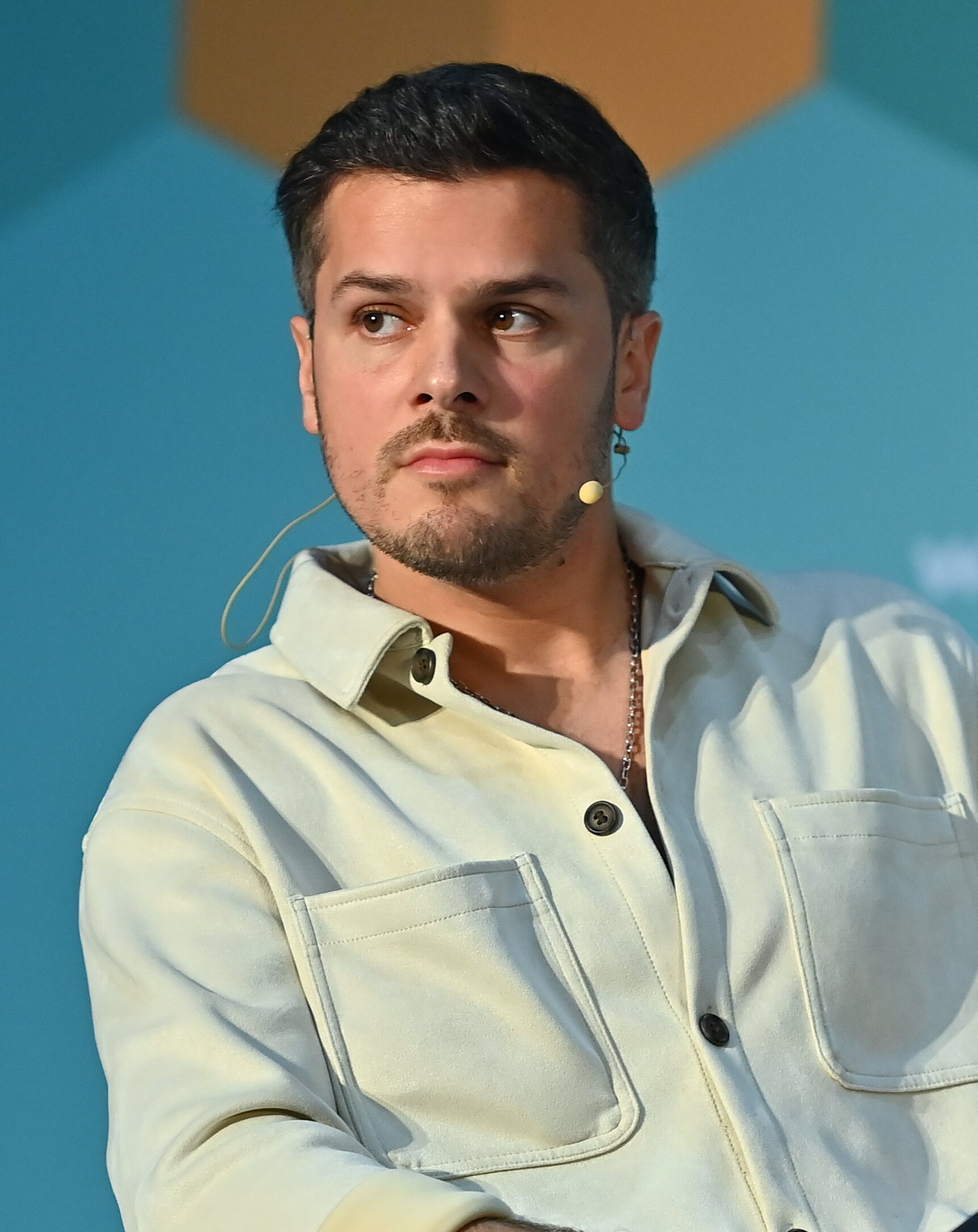
Mickael Carreira

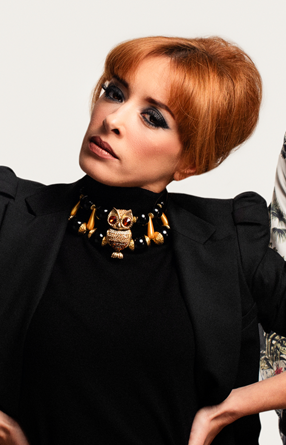
Marisa Liz

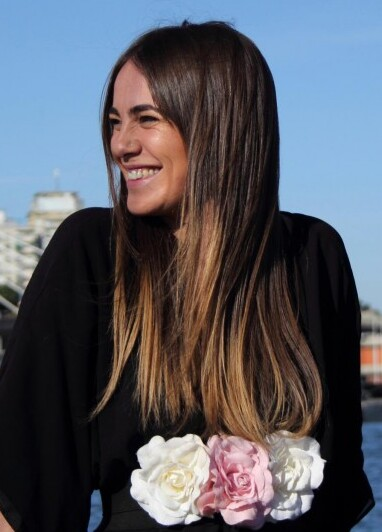
Gisela João

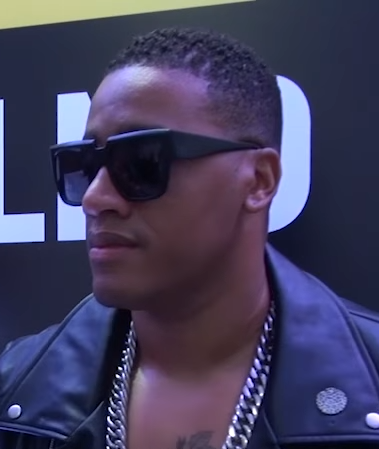
Anselmo Ralph

== Teams ==
- Winner
- Runner-up
- Eliminated in the Grand final
- Eliminated in the Knockouts

Coaches	Top 24 Groups		
Mickael Carreira			
Mickael Carreira	Cândido & Pedro	BEH	Israel, Israel & Roque
Mickael Carreira	Ana, Alice & João	Lara & Dany	Paulo & Marco
Marisa Liz			
Marisa Liz	Falta Um	Clube do Palco	Simone, Jorge & Diogo
Marisa Liz	Coral Juvenil de Carcavelos	La Família	Rubén & Inês
Gisela João			
Gisela João	D'Anto	Sara & Inês Coito	Sophia & Violeta
Gisela João	Diogo, Marco & Amigos	Família Alentejana	Helena & Diogo
Anselmo Ralph			
Anselmo Ralph	Raquel, Olinda & Margarida	Allysson & Mário	Bea & Nice
Anselmo Ralph	Família Ferreira Filipe	Otília & Mariana	Reika & Salo

== Blind Auditions ==
In the blind auditions, each coach has 6 spots to fill on their respective team. Each coach receives one block to use against another coach which effectively prevents that coach from getting the artist. At the end of the auditions, Marisa Liz did not use her block.

✔	Coach pressed the "EU QUERO" button
	Artists joined this coach's team
	Artists eliminated as no coach pressed the "EU QUERO" button
✘	Coach pressed the button "EU QUERO", but was:
	Blocked by Mickael Blocked by Marisa Blocked by Gisela Blocked by Anselmo

=== Episode 1 (20 July) ===
Order	Group	Song	Coach's and artist's choices			
Order	Group	Song	Mickael	Marisa	Gisela	Anselmo
1	Rubén & Inês	"Será Amor"	✔	✔	✔	✔
2	Sara & Inês Coito	"Ai Maria"	✔	✘	✔	✔
3	La Família	"Garota"	–	✔	✔	–
4	Inspirasom	"É P'rá Amanhã"	–	–	–	–
5	Allysson & Mário	"Proud Mary"	✔	–	–	✔
6	Família Alentejana	"Nasce o Sol no Alentejo"	–	–	✔	–
7	Lara & Dany	"Lovely"	✔	–	–	✔
8	As Ibéricas	"Vas a Quedarte"	–	–	–	–
9	Coral Juvenil de Carcavelos	"Happy Together"	✔	✔	✔	✘
10	Bea & Nice	"Cover Me in Sunshine"	✔	–	–	✔
11	Família Pinto	"A Gente Vai Continuar"	–	–	–	–
12	Diogo, Marco & Amigos	"Oh Minha Rosinha"	✔	✔	✔	✔

=== Episode 2 (27 July) ===
Order	Group	Song	Coach's and artist's choices			
Order	Group	Song	Mickael	Marisa	Gisela	Anselmo
1	BEH	"Don't Stop Believin'"	✔	–	✔	✔
2	Raquel, Olinda & Margarida	"Eu Não Sei Quem Te Perdeu"	–	–	–	✔
3	Clube do Palco	"When You Believe"	✔	✔	✔	✔
4	Jorge & Martim	"Amigos Coloridos"	–	–	–	–
5	Israel, Israel & Roque	"Eu Estou Aqui"	✔	–	–	–
6	Pedro & Sara	"Wildflower"	–	–	–	–
7	Sophia & Violeta	"No Time to Die" / "Seven Nation Army"	✘	–	✔	✔
8	Família Ferreira Filipe	"Fim do Mundo"	–	–	–	✔
9	PM²	"Homem do Leme"	–	–	–	–
10	Paulo & Marco	"Caruso"	✔	–	–	✔
11	Sandra & Rui	"Perdidamente"	–	–	–	–
12	Falta Um	"Se Fores Ao Alentejo"	✔	✔	✔	–

=== Episode 3 (3 August) ===
During the episode, Mariza surprised the coaches and audience behind a curtain, concealing her identity until the end of the performance.

Order	Group	Song	Coach's and artist's choices			
Order	Group	Song	Mickael	Marisa	Gisela	Anselmo
1	Cante Novo	"A Fisga"	–	–	–	–
2	Helena & Diogo	"I'd Do Anything for Love (But I Won't Do That)	✔	–	✔	✔
3	Simone, Jorge & Diogo	"A Carta"	✔	✔	✔	✔
4	Simão, Magda & Helena	"O Anzol"	–	Team full	–	–
5	Reika & Salo	"The Phantom of the Opera"	–	Team full	–	✔
6	Leonor, Clara & Mara	"Apt."	–	Team full	–	–
7	D'Anto	"Canção Das Lágrimas"	✔	Team full	✔	✔
8	Ana, Alice & João	"O Teu Nome"	✔	Team full	Team full	–
9	José, Ana, Gabriel & Maria	"Pedra Filosofal"	–	Team full	Team full	–
10	Cândido & Pedro	"No Rancho Fundo"	✔	Team full	Team full	✔
11	Ana Paula, Mariana & Luísa	"You Raise Me Up"	Team full	Team full	Team full	–
12	Otília & Mariana	"Menina Dos Olhos Tristes"	Team full	Team full	Team full	✔

== Knockouts ==
The knockouts (called tira-teimas in Portuguese) aired on 10 and 17 August. In this stage, each coach pairs his/her groups into three duos to perform head-to-head. Following each group's respective performance, the coach selects one to move on to the grand final, creating a total of twelve groups in the grand final.

Knockouts colour key
Group won the knockout and advanced to the grand final
Group lost the knockout and was eliminated

=== Episode 4 (10 August) ===
Fourth episode's results
Coach	Order	Winner		Loser	
Coach	Order	Song	Group	Group	Song
Gisela João	1	"Trova Nova"	D'Anto	Diogo, Marco & Amigos	"Chora Carolina"
Anselmo Ralph	2	"(I've Had) The Time of My Life"	Allysson & Mário	Família Ferreira Filipe	"O Amor É Assim"
Marisa Liz	3	"Fores Ao Alentejo"	Falta Um	Rubén & Inês	"Sorte Grande"
Mickael Carreira	4	"Love On Top"	BEH	Ana, Alice & João	"Todo o Tempo do Mundo"
Marisa Liz	5	"Primavera"	Simone, Jorge & Diogo	Coral Juvenil de Carcavelos	"Take On Me"
Gisela João	6	"Fado Português"	Sara & Inês Coito	Família Alentejana	"Menina Estás à Janela"

=== Episode 5 (17 August) ===
Fifth episode's results
Coach	Order	Winner		Loser	
Coach	Order	Song	Group	Group	Song
Mickael Carreira	1	"Gosto de Ti"	Israel, Israel & Roque	Paulo & Marco	"Primeiro Beijo"
Marisa Liz	2	"A Million Dreams"	Clube do Palco	La Família	"Porque Queramos Vernos"
Anselmo Ralph	3	"Onde Irei Ter"	Bea & Nice	Otília & Mariana	"O Verão, o Alentejo e os Homens"
Gisela João	4	"Lose Control"	Sophia & Violeta	Helena & Diogo	"Dancing in the Dark"
Mickael Carreira	5	"Mano a Mano"	Cândido & Pedro	Lara & Dany	"Lucky"
Anselmo Ralph	6	"Olá Solidão"	Raquel, Olinda & Margarida	Reika & Salo	"Rewrite the Stars"

== Grand final ==
The grand final aired on 24 August 2025. In this round, the top twelve groups performed for the title of The Voice Gerações. At the beginning of the episode, the twelve groups performed "Pôr do Sol." During the episode, Todagente, the winners of the second season, performed "Purple Rain" and Caruso."

At the end of the show, D'Anto from Team Gisela won the season, marking Gisela João's first win as a coach. She became the sixth (and first female) coach on all variations of the Portuguese The Voice to win on his/her debut season.

Final colour key round one
Group saved by the public and advanced to round two
Group was eliminated

Final colour key round two
Group finished as the winner of the season
Group finished as a runner-up of the season

=== Episode 6 (24 August) ===
Sixth episode's results
Round	Coach	Order	Artist	Song	Result
First (Top 12)	Gisela João	1	Sara & Inês Coito	"Lisboa à Noite"	Eliminated
First (Top 12)	Mickael Carreira	2	BEH	"Man! I Feel Like a Woman!"	Eliminated
First (Top 12)	Marisa Liz	3	Falta Um	"Trago o Alentejo na Voz"	Public's vote
First (Top 12)	Anselmo Ralph	4	Allysson & Mário	"The Best"	Eliminated
First (Top 12)	Gisela João	5	D'Anto	"Canção de Embalar"	Public's vote
First (Top 12)	Mickael Carreira	6	Israel, Israel & Roque	"Verdade"	Eliminated
First (Top 12)	Gisela João	7	Sophia & Violeta	"Can't Catch Me Now"	Eliminated
First (Top 12)	Marisa Liz	8	Clube do Palco	"Defying Gravity"	Eliminated
First (Top 12)	Mickael Carreira	9	Cândido & Pedro	"Quem Me Vê"	Public's vote
First (Top 12)	Anselmo Ralph	10	Bea & Nice	"Sem Voz"	Eliminated
First (Top 12)	Marisa Liz	11	Simone, Jorge & Diogo	"Viagem"	Eliminated
First (Top 12)	Anselmo Ralph	12	Raquel, Olinda & Margarida	"Ouvi Dizer"	Public's vote
Second (Top 4)	Marisa Liz	1	Falta Um	"Se Fores Ao Alentejo"	Runner-up
Second (Top 4)	Gisela João	2	D'Anto	"Canção Das Lágrimas"	Winner
Second (Top 4)	Mickael Carreira	3	Cândido & Pedro	"No Rancho Fundo"	Runner-up
Second (Top 4)	Anselmo Ralph	4	Raquel, Olinda & Margarida	"Eu Não Sei Quem Te Perdeu"	Runner-up
