= MTV Europe Music Award for Best Portuguese Act =

Category of MTV Europe Music Awards

The following is a list of the MTV Europe Music Award winners and nominees for Best Portuguese Act.

== Winners and nominees ==
Winners are listed first and highlighted in bold.

=== 2000s ===
Year	Artist	Ref
2003
2003	**Blind Zero**	
2003	Blasted Mechanism	
2003	David Fonseca	
2003	Fonzie	
2003	Primitive Reason	
2004
2004	**Da Weasel**	
2004	Clã	
2004	Gomo	
2004	Mesa	
2004	Toranja	
2005
2005	**The Gift**	
2005	Blasted Mechanism	
2005	Boss AC	
2005	Da Weasel	
2005	Humanos	
2006
2006	**Moonspell**	
2006	Boss AC	
2006	Expensive Soul	
2006	David Fonseca	
2006	Mind Da Gap	
2007
2007	**Da Weasel**	
2007	Blasted Mechanism	
2007	Buraka Som Sistema	
2007	Fonzie	
2007	Sam The Kid	
2008
2008	**Buraka Som Sistema**	
2008	Rita Redshoes	
2008	Sam The Kid	
2008	Slimmy	
2008	The Vicious Five	
2009
2009	**Xutos e Pontapés**	
2009	Buraka Som Sistema	
2009	David Fonseca	
2009	Os Pontos Negros	
2009	X-Wife	

=== 2010s ===
Year	Artist	Ref
2010
2010	**Nu Soul Family**	
2010	Deolinda	
2010	Diabo na Cruz	
2010	Legendary Tiger Man	
2010	Orelha Negra	
2011
2011	**Aurea**	
2011	Amor Electro	
2011	Diego Miranda	
2011	Expensive Soul	
2011	The Gift	
2012
2012	**Aurea**	
2012	Amor Electro	
2012	Klepht	
2012	Monica Ferraz	
2012	Os Azeitonas	
2013
2013	**Filipe Pinto**	
2013	Monica Ferraz	
2013	Os Azeitonas	
2013	Richie Campbell	
2013	The Gift	
2014
2014	**David Carreira**	
2014	Amor Electro	
2014	Diego Miranda	
2014	HMB	
2014	Richie Campbell	
2015
2015	**Agir**	
2015	Carolina Deslandes	
2015	Carlão	
2015	D.A.M.A	
2015	Richie Campbell	
2016
2016	**David Carreira**	
2016	D.A.M.A	
2016	Aurea	
2016	HMB	
2016	Carlão	
2017
2017	**DJ Overule**	
2017	HMB	
2017	Mickael Carreira	
2017	Miguel Araújo	
2017	Virgul	
2018
2018	**Diogo Piçarra**	
2018	Blaya	
2018	Bárbara Bandeira	
2018	Bispo	
2018	Carolina Deslandes	
2019
2019	**Fernando Daniel**	
2019	David Carreira	
2019	Plutónio	
2019	ProfJam	
2019	TAY	

=== 2020s ===
Year	Artist	Ref
2020
2020	**Fernando Daniel**	
2020	Bárbara Bandeira	
2020	Diogo Piçarra	
2020	Bispo	
2020	Dino D'Santiago	
2021
2021	**Diogo Piçarra**	
2021	Bárbara Tinoco	
2021	Nenny	
2021	Plutónio	
2021	Wet Bed Gang	
2022
2022	**Bárbara Bandeira**	
2022	Ivandro	
2022	Julinho KSD	
2022	Syro	
2022	T-Rex	
2023
2023	**Bispo**	
2023	Bárbara Tinoco	
2023	Carolina Deslandes	
2023	Marisa Liz	
2023	Piruka	
2024
2024	**Bárbara Bandeira**	
2024	Bárbara Tinoco	
2024	Dillaz	
2024	Ivandro	
2024	Slow J	
