= Bárbara Bandeira =

Portuguese pop singer

- Born: Bárbara Sofia Holanda Bandeira; 23 June 2001 (age 25); Azeitão, Portugal
- Genre: Pop
- Occupation: Singer
- Years active: 2011–present
- Labels: Klasszik, Valentim de Carvalho

Bárbara Sofia Holanda Bandeira (born 23 June 2001) is a Portuguese pop singer. She was born in Azeitão, the youngest daughter of the Portuguese singer Rui Bandeira, who represented Portugal at the Eurovision Song Contest 1999.

== Career ==
In 2011, she participated on the 4th season of Uma Canção para Ti, a Portuguese talent show for kids, and ended up being a semi-finalist. Later, in 2014 and only 13 years old she participated on The Voice Kids Portugal, she eventually chose Anselmo Ralph as a mentor and ended up being eliminated on the live shows.

In 2017, her song "És Tu" was part of the soundtrack of the Portuguese telenovela Espelho d'Água.

On 3 July 2022, it was announced that Bandeira would be a coach on The Voice Gerações alongside Mickael Carreira, Simone de Oliveira, and her former coach, Anselmo Ralph. The spin-off is the Generations version of The Voice and took take place eight years after she participated on The Voice Kids.

== Awards and nominations ==
Year	Award	Category	Result
2018	Golden Globes (Portugal)	Best Newcomer	Won
2018	MTV Europe Music Award	Best Portuguese Act	Nominated
2020	MTV Europe Music Award	Best Portuguese Act	Nominated
2022	Golden Globes (Portugal)	Best Song - "Onde Vais" (with Carminho)	Nominated
2022	PLAY - Portuguese Music Awards	Best Song - "Onde Vais" (with Carminho)	Won
2022	MTV Europe Music Award	Best Portuguese Act	Won
2024	PLAY - Portuguese Music Awards	Best Song - "Como Tu" (with Ivandro)	Nominated
2024	PLAY - Portuguese Music Awards	Best Female Artist	Won
2024	MTV Europe Music Award	Best Portuguese Act	Won
2025	PLAY - Portuguese Music Awards	Best Song - "Carro" (feat. Dillaz)	Nominated
2025	PLAY - Portuguese Music Awards	Best Female Artist	Won
2026	PLAY - Portuguese Music Awards	Best Music Video - "Não Gosta" (directed by Ruben do Valle)	Pending
2026	PLAY - Portuguese Music Awards	Best Female Artist	Pending

== Discography ==
=== Albums ===
Title	Details	Peak chart positions
Title	Details	POR
Cartas	Released: 8 June 2018 (POR); Label: Klasszik	1

=== Singles ===
List of singles, with selected details and chart positions
Title	Year	Peak chart positions	Album
Title	Year	POR	Album
"Crazy"	2015	—	Non-album singles
"És Tu"	2016	—	Non-album singles
"A Última Carta"	2017	—	Cartas
"Como Sou"	2018	—	Cartas
"E Se Eu"	2018	—	Cartas
"Friendzone"	2018	—	Cartas
"Nem Sequer Doeu"	2018	—	Cartas
"One Nation" (with Karetus and Yuzi)	2018	—	Non-album singles
"Como tu" (featuring Ivandro)	2022	1	Non-album singles
"—" denotes a recording that did not chart or was not released in that territory.
