= Fernando Daniel =

Portuguese singer-songwriter

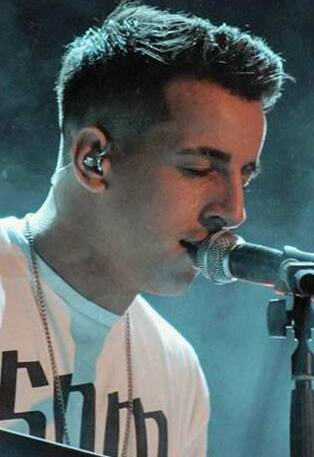
- Daniel in 2019

Background information
- Born: 11 May 1996 (age 30); Estarreja, Portugal
- Genres: Soul; Pop; Ballad
- Occupation: Singer
- Instruments: Voice; Guitar; Piano
- Years active: 2014–present
- Label: Universal Music Portugal

Fernando Daniel Rodrigues Almeida (born 11 May 1996), known professionally as Fernando Daniel is a Portuguese singer-songwriter. He won the fourth season of The Voice Portugal in 2016 as part of Team Mickael Carreira.

== Career ==
=== 2014: Factor X ===
Daniel's first experiences with singing were singing at school parties for his friends. He first appeared in the musical industry in 2014, on the Portuguese TV show Factor X, which is the Portuguese version of the worldwide known music show The X Factor. He auditioned on the second edition, alone, and was finally eliminated in the piano phase. However, the judges liked his voice and decided to join him together with Luana Ribeiro, another contestant who was eliminated in the piano phase. Together, they formed the group BABEL, which finally ended 4th place overall at the show.

=== 2016: The Voice Portugal ===
Later, in 2016, he appeared on the 4th season of The Voice Portugal to try his luck again. In the blind auditions, Daniel sang Adele's "When We Were Young" and all four coaches, Marisa Liz, Mickael Carreira, Aurea, and Anselmo Ralph, turned their chairs for him. Daniel chose to be a part of Team Mickael Carreira. His audition was a huge success worldwide and in the country, beating the record of the most watched audition of The Voice. On YouTube alone, the performance has over 120 million views. He went on to win the show in December, receiving the majority of the public votes.

=== 2017: Festival da Canção and first original single ===
In 2017, he was invited by the Portuguese composer Henrique Feist to sing his song "Poema a Dois" in Festival da Canção and try to represent Portugal in the Eurovision Song Contest 2017. He finished in 5th place on the Final. The Grand Finale was eventually won by Salvador Sobral, who sang "Amar Pelos Dois", that ended up winning the contest.

In July 2017, Fernando Daniel released his first original single, "Espera", which was included in the soundtrack for the Portuguese telenovela "A Herdeira". "Espera" was included in his first studio album, Salto, which was released in March 2018.

=== 2019: MTV EMA winner ===
In 2019, Fernando won the Best Portuguese Act award at the 2019 MTV Europe Music Awards receiving the prize at the live event in Seville.

=== 2021–present: The Voice Kids & The Voice coach and Junior Eurovision Song Contest composer ===
From 2021 to 2023, he was featured as a coach on the children's version of The Voice Portugal. His first season was the second season in this format, becoming the first The Voice Portugal winner to become a coach. His contestant, Simão Oliveira, won the contest and represented Portugal in the Junior Eurovision Song Contest 2021 in Paris. Fernando was later on selected by RTP1 as the composer of the song. Later that year, it was announced that Fernando would return in 2022 as a coach. In his second season, his contestant, Maria Gil, won the finale, making him the winning coach for two consecutive seasons. In 2023, Fernando returned for season 4, his third season as a coach on The Voice Kids. In the fourth season of the show altogether, Daniel's contestant, Júlia Machado, won the season, making him the winning coach for the third consecutive season. He became the first coach in any variation of the Portuguese version of the show to win more than two consecutive seasons. In 2024, it was revealed that Daniel would not return as a coach for season 5, being replaced by Nininho Vaz Maia.

In 2023, he became a coach on season 11 of the main version of The Voice Portugal, seven years after he won the show. His final contestant, Guilherme Baptista, finished in third place in the season finale. He returned as a coach for season 12 in the fall of 2024. Daniel's artist Rafael Ribeiro won the season, marking Daniel's first win as a coach on the main version of the show. With four wins across all variations of the show, he tied with Marisa Liz as the most winning coach in the show's history. He returned for season 13 in the fall of 2025 where his final artist, António Paulino, finished as the runner-up of the season.

== Discography ==
=== Studio albums ===
List of studio albums, with selected details and chart positions
Title	Details	Peak chart positions	Certifications
Title	Details	POR	Certifications
Salto	Released: 16 March 2018; Label: Universal Music Portugal; Formats: CD, digital download, streaming	1	AFP: Gold
Presente	Released: 10 July 2020; Label: Universal Music Portugal; Formats: CD, digital download, streaming	1	AFP: Platinum
V.H.S (Vol. 1)	Released: 26 May 2023; Label: Universal Music Portugal; Formats: CD, digital download, streaming	1	

=== Singles ===
List of singles, with selected details and chart positions
Title	Year	Peak chart positions	Certifications	Album
Title	Year	POR	Certifications	Album
"Poema a dois"	2017	—		Festival da Canção 2017
"Espera"	2017	46	AFP: Platinum	Salto
"Nada mais"	2018	56	AFP: Gold	Salto
"Mágoa"	2018	—		Salto
"Voltas"	2018	51	AFP: 2× Platinum	Salto
"Tal como sou"	2019	75	AFP: Platinum	Presente
"Melodia da saudade"	2019	90	AFP: Platinum	Presente
"Se eu" (featuring Melim)	2019	29	AFP: 2× Platinum	Presente
"Muito mais além"	2019	—		Frozen II
"Cair"	2020	—		Presente
"Recomeçar"	2020	—	AFP: Gold	Presente
"Sem ti" (featuring Agir)	2020	171	AFP: Gold	Presente
"Raro"	2021	156	AFP: Gold	Presente
"#VoltamosJuntos" (with Carolina Deslandes featuring Carlão)	2021	—		Non-album single
"Encontrar" (with Piruka)	2022	56		Presente
"Suprior" (with ProfJam)	2022	141		Non-album single
"Prometo"	2022	124		V.H.S (Vol. 1)
"Metade" (featuring Beatriz Rosário)	2023	—		V.H.S (Vol. 1)
"Casa"	2023	57	AFP: 2× Platinum	V.H.S (Vol. 1)
"Mantém a ligação" (with Marisa Liz and Ivandro)	2023	—		Non-album singles
"Contigo"	2023	—		Non-album singles
"Dois"	2024	—		Non-album singles
"Tu és capaz" (with Sara Correia featuring Bispo)	2024	—		Non-album singles
"Myself" (with Sofia Camara)	2024	—		Non-album singles
"Medo"	2025	—		Festival da Canção 2025
"Dónde vamos?" (with Álvaro De Luna)	2025	—		Non-album singles
"Juro"	2026	— (Note: "Juro" did not enter the Top 200 Singles chart, but peaked at number six on the Top Airplay Radios chart.)		Non-album singles
"Emocional"	2026	— (Note: "Emocional" did not enter the Top 200 Singles chart, but peaked at number 33 on the Top Airplay Radios chart.)		Non-album singles
"—" denotes a recording that did not chart or was not released in that territory.

== Awards ==
Year	Award	Nominee	Category	Result
2019	MTV Europe Music Award	Fernando Daniel	Best Portuguese Act	Won

== Notes ==
Awards and achievements
Preceded by Deolinda Kinzimba	The Voice Portugal; Winner; 2016	Succeeded by Tomás Adrião
Preceded by Diogo Piçarra	MTV Europe Music Award for Best Portuguese Act; Winner; 2019	Succeeded by
