= Vasco Palmeirim =

Portuguese presenter and comedian

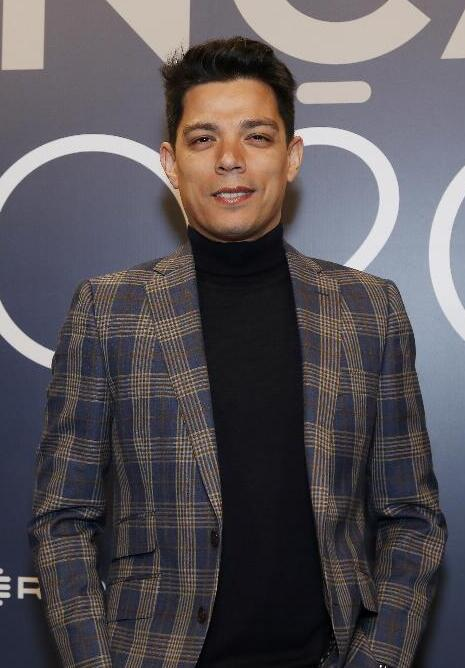
- Vasco Palmeirim in 2021
- Born: Vasco Maria Palmeirim Peres Gomes; 29 August 1979 (age 46); Lisbon
- Education: Catholic University of Portugal
- Occupations: Television host; radio announcer; actor; comedian; voice actor
- Years active: 2011–present
- Children: 2

Vasco Maria Palmeirim Peres Gomes (born 29 August 1979) is a Portuguese radio announcer and television presenter.

== Biography ==
Palmeirim studied Social Communication at the Faculty of Human Sciences of the Portuguese Catholic University.

He was part of the team at Canal Q, Produções Fictícias' cable channel, where he presented A Costeleta de Adão with Ana Markl between 2011 and 2014. He also presented the RTP 1 program Feitos ao Bife, replacing Catarina Furtado, and the program Sabe ou Não Sabe.

Palmeirim is best known for hosting Manhãs da Comercial on Rádio Comercial with Pedro Ribeiro, Nuno Markl – with whom he also hosted PRIMO (Programa Realmente Incrível Mas Obtuso) on the same radio station–Vera Fernandes and Elsa Teixeira.

Between 2014 and 2023, he presented the talent show The Voice Portugal, with Catarina Furtado, and since 2019, he has been one of the presenters of the RTP Song Festival, both in RTP1.

He also does dubbing and writes lyrics.

=== Career ===
Channel	Year	Program name	Info
Canal Q	2011–2014	Costeleta de Adão	Host
RTP1	2013	Feitos ao Bife 1	Jury
RTP1	2013	Feitos ao Bife 2	Host
RTP1	2013–2016	Sabe ou Não Sabe	Host
RTP1	2014	The Voice Portugal 2	Host, with Catarina Furtado
RTP1	2014	The Voice Kids Portugal 1	Host, with Mariana Monteiro
RTP1	2015	Bem-Vindos a Beirais	Special guest
RTP1	2015–2016	The Voice Portugal 3	Host, with Catarina Furtado
RTP1	2016	The Voice Portugal 4	Host, with Catarina Furtado
RTP1	2017	The Voice Portugal 5	Host, with Catarina Furtado
RTP1	2018–2022 / 2023–present	Joker	Host
RTP1	2018	The Voice Portugal 6	Host, with Catarina Furtado
RTP1	2019	Final do Festival RTP da Canção 2019	Host, with Filomena Cautela
RTP1	2019	I Love Portugal 1	Host, with Filomena Cautela
RTP1	2019–2020	The Voice Portugal 7	Host, with Catarina Furtado
RTP1	2020	Final do Festival RTP da Canção 2020	Host, with Filomena Cautela
RTP1	2020	Alta Fidelidade	Host
RTP1	2020	I Love Portugal 2	Host, with Filomena Cautela
RTP1	2020–2021	The Voice Portugal 8	Host, with Catarina Furtado
RTP1	2020–present	Natal dos Hospitais	Co-Host
RTP1	2021	Final do Festival RTP da Canção 2021	Host, with Filomena Cautela
RTP1	2021	I Love Portugal 3	Host, with Filomena Cautela
RTP1	2021–2022	The Voice Portugal 9	Host, with Catarina Furtado
RTP1	2022	Final do Festival RTP da Canção 2022	Host, with Filomena Cautela
RTP1	2022–present	Taskmaster	Host, with Nuno Markl
RTP1	2022	The Voice Gerações	Host, with Catarina Furtado
RTP1	2022–2023	Porquinho Mealheiro	Host
RTP1	2022–2023	The Voice Portugal 10	Host, with Catarina Furtado
RTP1	2023	Final of the Festival RTP da Canção 2023	Host, with Filomena Cautela
RTP1	2023	The Voice Gerações	Host, with Catarina Furtado
RTP1	2023	Pôr do Sol–Episódio Especial Bloopers	Host
RTP1	2024	Final of the Festival RTP da Canção 2024	Host, with Filomena Cautela

== Personal life ==
Vasco Palmeirim is the son of Manuel Luís Peres da Silva Newton Gomes, a musician and orchestra director, and Maria José Pacheco Palmeirim, a ballet master at the Ballet national company.

Palmeirim married Bárbara Magalhães on 29 September 2018, with whom he has two sons, Tomás, born 2015, and Matias, born 2020.
