= The Voice Kids (Portuguese TV series) =

Portuguese TV series

- Created by: John de Mol; Roel van Velzen
- Presented by: Mariana Monteiro; Vasco Palmeirim; Catarina Furtado
- Judges: Anselmo Ralph; Daniela Mercury; Raquel Tavares; Carlão; Carolina Deslandes; Fernando Daniel; Marisa Liz; Bárbara Tinoco; Aurea; Cuca Roseta; Nininho Vaz Maia; Diogo Piçarra; Miguel Cristovinho; Nena
- Composer: Martijn Schimmer
- Country of origin: Portugal
- Original language: Portuguese
- No. of seasons: 7
- No. of episodes: 81

Production
- Executive producers: Pedro Curto; Piet-Hein Bakker
- Running time: 60–150 mins
- Production companies: Shine Iberia (2014, 2025–present); Talpa Media (2014); ITV Studios (2021–2024)

Original release
- Network: RTP1
- Release: 28 September – 14 December 2014
- Release: 10 January 2021 – present

Related
- The Voice Portugal

The Voice Kids is the junior version of The Voice Portugal, broadcast on RTP1, with competitors between the ages of seven and fourteen. (Note: As of 1 November of the year the season takes place; seven and fifteen in the first five seasons.) The first season premiered in 2014, and the show did not come back for a second season until 2021. In April 2019, RTP1 announced a reboot of the show, which was set to premiere in 2020, but ended up being postponed due to the COVID-19 restrictions.

Since 2021, the competition has been used to select the artist that represents Portugal in the Junior Eurovision Song Contest, though it was only confirmed by RTP as the selection method in 2025.

== History ==
The first season premiered on 28 September 2014, with Daniela Mercury, Anselmo Ralph, and Raquel Tavares as coaches, and presented by Mariana Monteiro and Vasco Palmeirim. In April 2019, RTP1 announced a reboot for the kids' version. Starting in 2021, the second season featured a new host, Catarina Furtado, and a coaching panel of four new coaches: Carlão, Fernando Daniel, Carolina Deslandes, and Marisa Liz. The third season premiered on 8 May 2022 with Bárbara Tinoco replacing Liz, while Carlão, Daniel, and Deslandes continued on the show as coaches. The fourth season premiered on 9 April 2023 with Aurea replacing Deslandes. The fifth season premiered on 14 April 2024 with Cuca Roseta and Nininho Vaz Maia replacing Aurea and Daniel, while Carlão and Tinoco continued as coaches. The sixth season premiered on 6 April 2025 with only Roseta returning as a coach from the previous season. Diogo Piçarra, Miguel Cristovinho, and Nena replaced Carlão, Vaz Maia, and Tinoco as debuting coaches. The seventh season premiered on 19 April 2026 with, for the first time in the show's history, all coaches returning from the previous season.

== Timeline of coaches and hosts ==
Coach	Seasons						
Coach	1	2	3	4	5	6	7
Raquel Tavares							
Anselmo Ralph							
Daniela Mercury							
Marisa Liz							
Carlão							
Carolina Deslandes							
Fernando Daniel							
Bárbara Tinoco							
Aurea							
Nininho Vaz Maia							
Cuca Roseta							
Diogo Piçarra							
Nena							
Miguel Cristovinho							
Host	1	2	3	4	5	6	7
Mariana Monteiro							
Vasco Palmeirim							
Catarina Furtado							
Backstage host	1	2	3	4	5	6	7
Rui Maria Pêgo							
Bárbara Lourenço							
Fábio Lopes							
Catarina Maia							
Maria Petronilho							

=== Coaches' line-up ===
Coaches' line-up by chairs order
Season	Year	Coaches			
Season	Year	1	2	3	4
1	2014	Raquel	Anselmo	Daniela	—N/a
2	2021	Marisa	Carlão	Carolina	Fernando
3	2022	Fernando	Bárbara	Carlão	Carolina
4	2023	Aurea	Carlão	Bárbara	Fernando
5	2024	Bárbara	Nininho	Cuca	Carlão
6	2025	Diogo	Nena	Cristo	Cuca
7	2026	Diogo	Nena	Cristo	Cuca

== Gallery ==
Coaches gallery

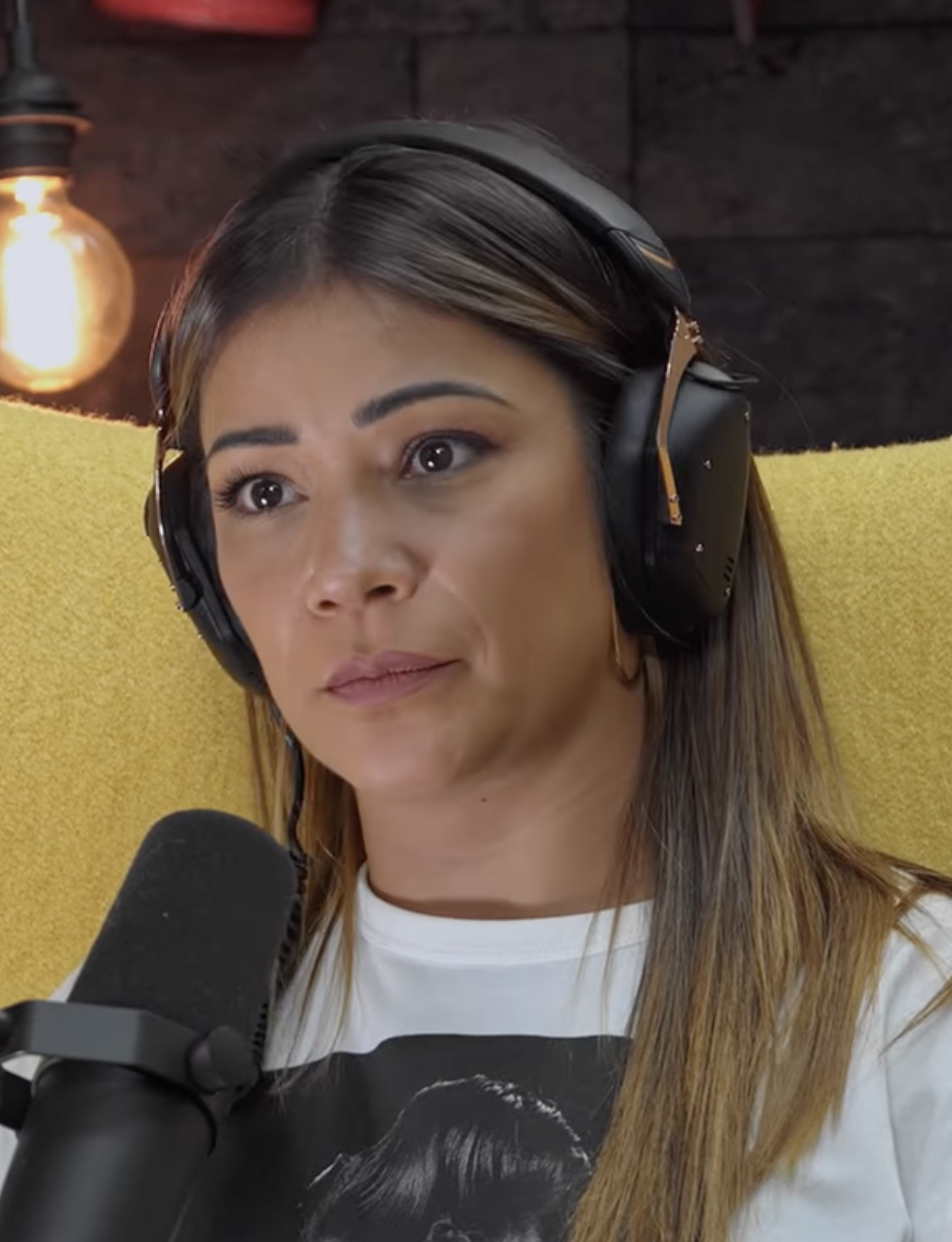
Raquel Tavares (1)

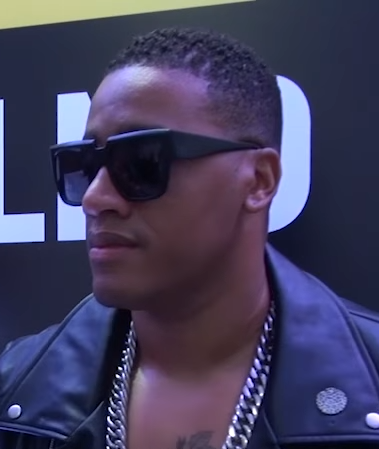
Anselmo Ralph (1)

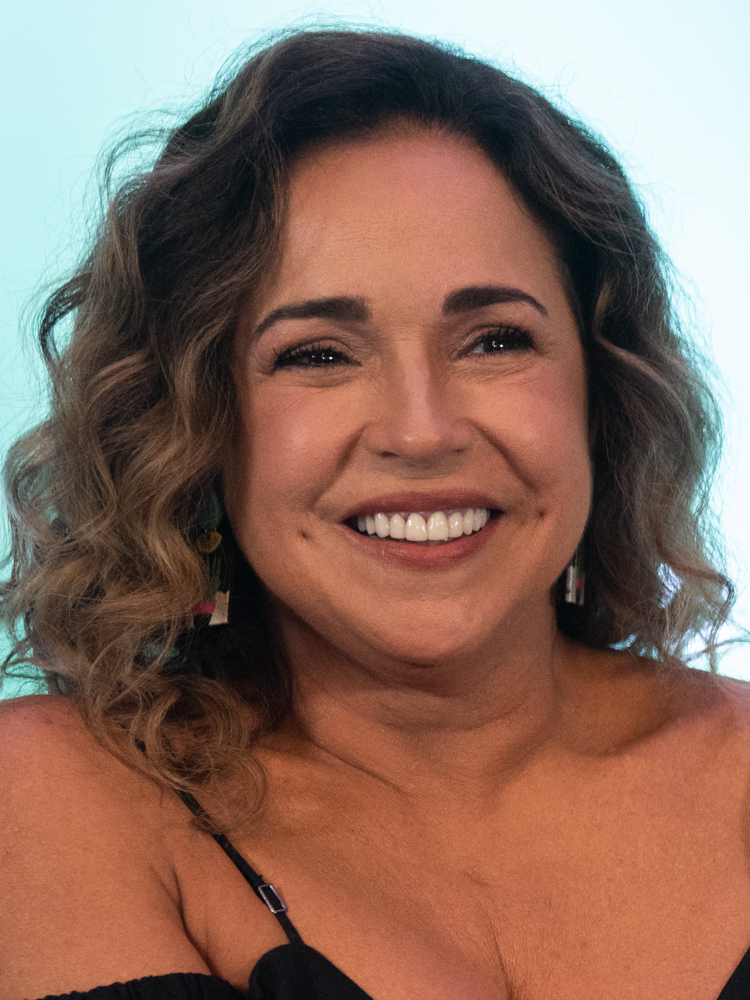
Daniela Mercury (1)

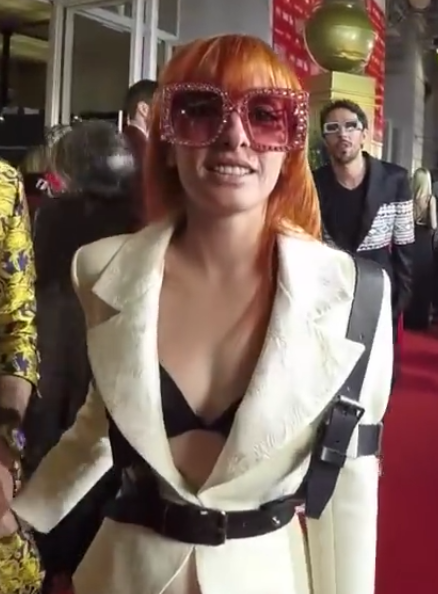
Marisa Liz (2)

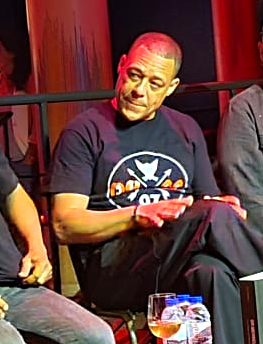
Carlão (2–5)

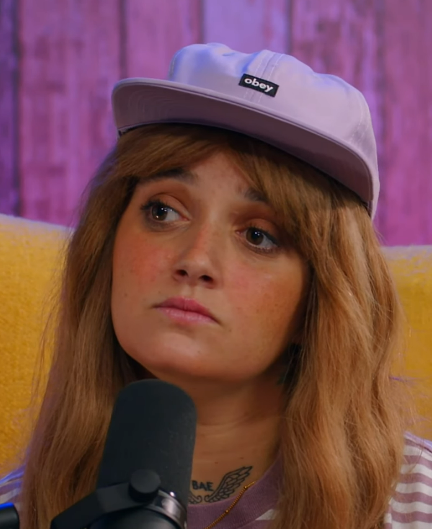
Carolina Deslandes (2–3)

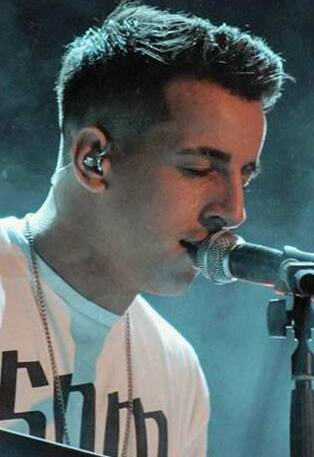
Fernando Daniel (2–4)

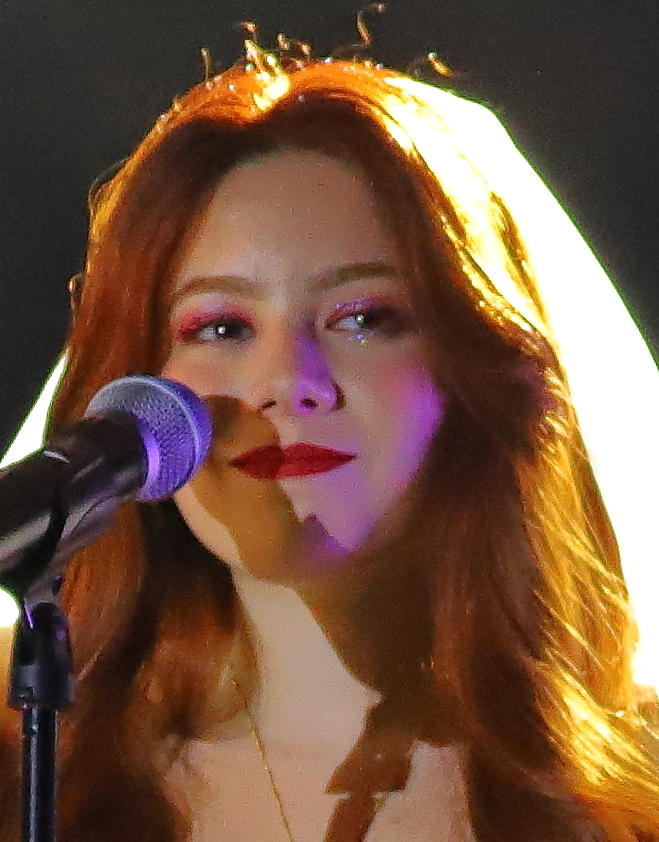
Bárbara Tinoco (3–5)

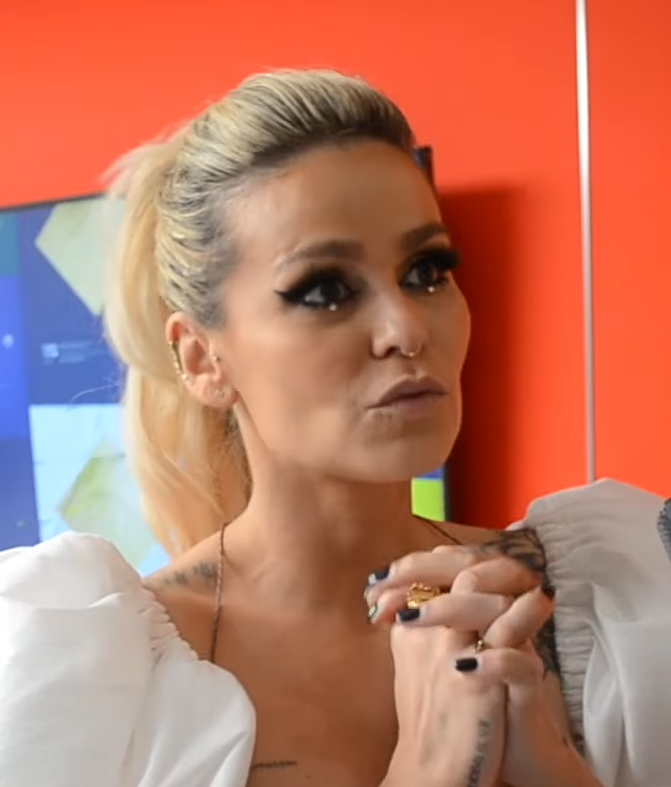
Aurea (4)

Nininho Vaz Maia (5)

Cuca Roseta (5–present)

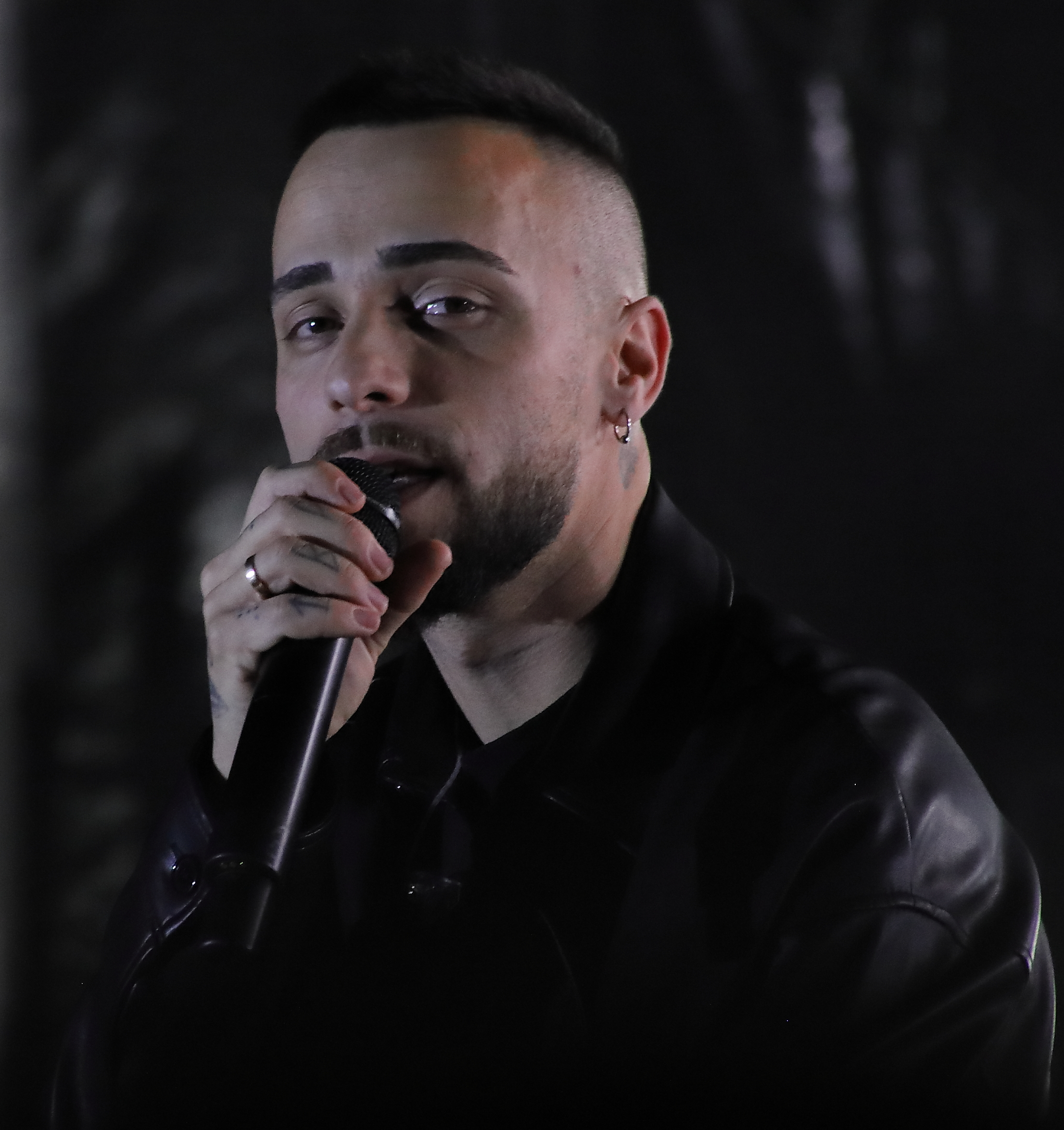
Diogo Piçarra (6–present)

Nena (6–present)

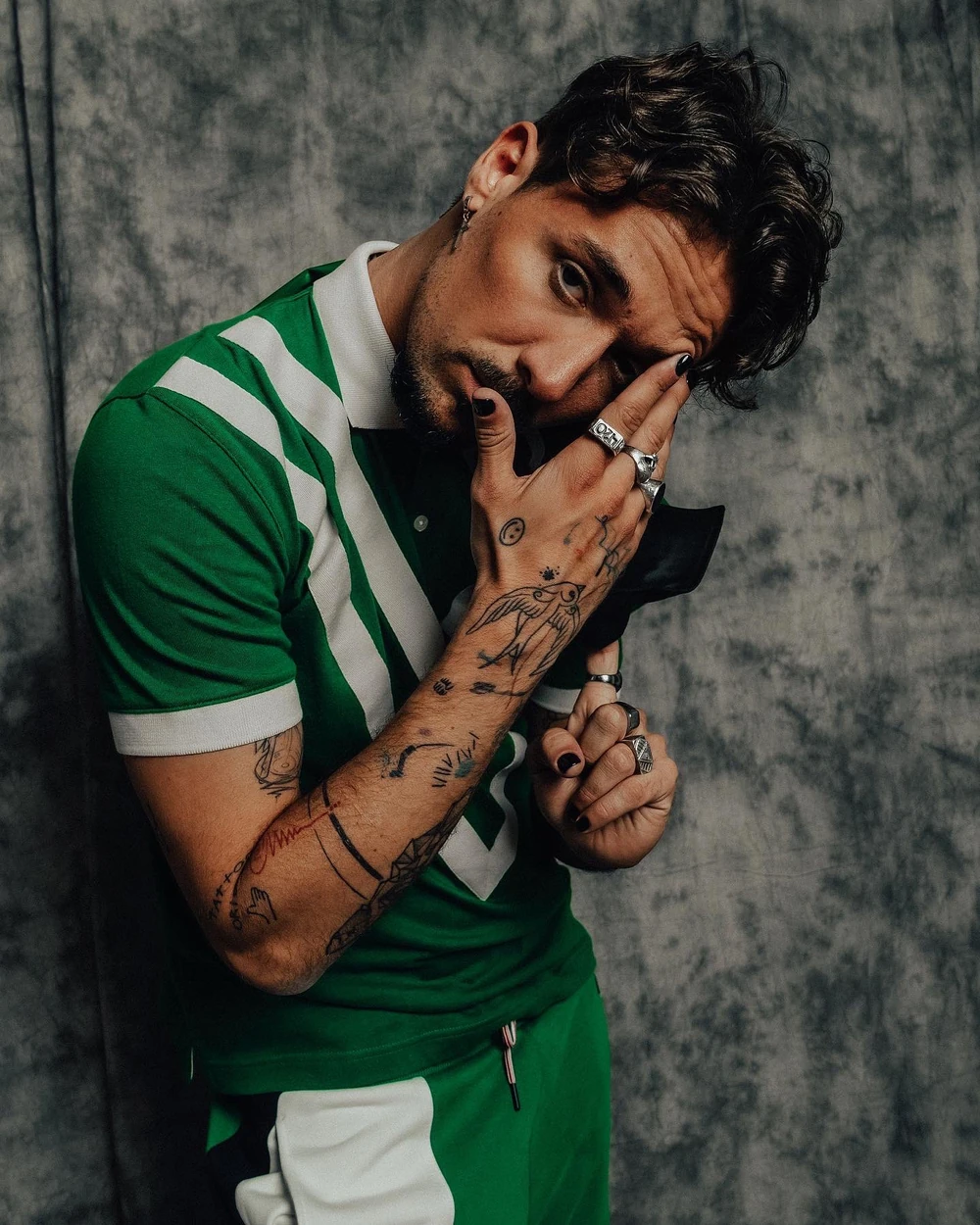
Miguel Cristovinho (6–present)

== Coaches' teams and their artists ==
- These are each of the coaches' teams throughout the seasons' live shows. Winners are in **bold** and finalists in italic.

Season	Coaches and contestants			
1	Team Raquel	Team Anselmo	Team Daniela	
1	Filipa Ferreira; Salomé Silveira; Ana Rita Coelho; José Moreira; Alicia Correia; Carlos Pinheiro	Carolina Leite; Pedro Goulão; Carolina Martins; Marta Costa; Bárbara Bandeira; João Pereira	**Diogo Garcia**; Bruna Guerreiro; Ana Silva; Juliana Ignácio; João Pedro Gonçalves; Sara Monteiro	
2	Team Marisa	Team Carlão	Team Carolina	Team Fernando
2	Aurora Pinto; Maria Inês; Lívia Barros; Madalena Castro; Leonor Carvalheira; Ana Veríssimo	Mia Benita; Nuno Siqueira; Marina Maranhão; Afonso Silva; Alexandre Caldeira; Ísis Salgueiro	Rita Rocha; Rosa Antunes; Madalena Guedes; Rúben Martins; Joana Lopes; Manuel Duarte	**Simão Oliveira**; Margarida Machado; Leonor Sá-Chaves; Mariana Leal; Fabiana Ferreira; Tomás Pascoal
3	Team Fernando	Team Bárbara	Team Carlão	Team Carolina
3	**Maria Gil**; Madalena Dias; Lúcia Vicente; Noa Rangel; Dinis Reis; Íris Fernandes	Margarida Rodrigues; Rita Serrano; Juliana Matado; Rúben Antunes; Alice Fonseca; Joana Santos	Martim Helena; Bia Antunes; Laura Pereira; Margarida Oliveira; Maria Correia; Maria R. Andrade	Nicolas Alves; Beatriz Silva; Andreia Santos; Salvador Palmela; Clara Gonzalez; Rita Sales
4	Team Aurea	Team Carlão	Team Bárbara	Team Fernando
4	Maria Pedro; Carolina Quintas; Francisco Bessa; Yasmin Alicia; Santiago Hassam; Vicente Oliveira	Francisco Horta; Francisco Santos; Isabel Silva; Luísa Mascarenhas; Lucas Machado; Tatiana Francisco	Rodrigo Oliveira; Martim d'Aires; Rodrigo Rosa; Sofia Silva; Lavínia Guimarães; Maria Leonor Pereira	**Júlia Machado**; Matilde Abreu; Francisca Rodrigues; Valéria Guba; Eva Alves; Miguel Abreu
5	Team Bárbara	Team Nininho	Team Cuca	Team Carlão
5	Maria Benedita; Simão Romão; Constança Santos; Diogo Serrano; Gonçalo Quintela; Victória Almeida	**Victoria Nicole**; Alícia Espírito Santo; Maria Verne; Martim Costa; Dinis Oliveira; Maria Carolina Pinto	Leonor Quinteiro; Leonor Vaz Dias; Samuel Sousa; Sofia Figueiredo; Diogo Gante; Sofia Salgado	Francisco Dias; Duarte Antunes; Eva Rocha; Pedro Ribeiro; Constança Soares; Tiago Freitas
6	Team Diogo	Team Nena	Team Cristo	Team Cuca
6	Maria Vinagre; Martim Ferreira; Sofia Caeiro; Beatriz Faria; Diana Gracia; Luca Monteiro	Matilde Azevedo; João Oliveira; Bárbara Califórnia; Isa Ferreira; Filipa Nogueira; Isabel Pereira	**Inês Gonçalves**; Rubén Correia; Rafael Afonso; Lucas Heitor; Joana Lamela; Maria Leonor Santos	Lara Martins; Carlos Abreu; Laura Fernambuco; Miguel Moura; Luísa Pimentel; Francisca Queiroz
7	**Salvador Rio**; Duarte Alves; Maria Leonor Antunes; Jorge Godinho; Mariana Jorge; Salomé Pinho	Vitória Fernandes; Maria Luíza Pinheiro; Eva Moreira; António & Vasco Martins; Mia Ribeiro; Giovanna Silva	Ana Rita Torres; Madalena Chaves; Samuel Aguiar; Martim Cabral; Leonor Lopes	Daniela Fontão; Lara Ferreira; Amarílys Câmara; Maria Eduarda; Lara Invêncio; Carolina Rodrigues

== Series overview ==
Warning: the following table presents a significant amount of different colors.

Teams color key
Artist from Team Daniela	Artist from Team Fernando	Artist from Team Nininho
Artist from Team Anselmo	Artist from Team Marisa	Artist from Team Diogo
Artist from Team Raquel	Artist from Team Bárbara	Artist from Team Cristo
Artist from Team Carlão	Artist from Team Aurea	Artist from Team Nena
Artist from Team Carolina	Artist from Team Cuca

Portuguese The Voice Kids series overview
Season	Year	Winner	Finalists				Winning coach	Presenter(s)
1	2014	Diogo Garcia	Carolina Leite	Filipa Ferreira	—N/a		Daniela Mercury	Mariana Monteiro, Vasco Palmeirim
2	2021	Simão Oliveira	Aurora Pinto	Rita Rocha	Maria Inês	Mia Benita	Fernando Daniel	Catarina Furtado
3	2022	Maria Gil	Nicolas Alves	Margarida Rodrigues	Martim Helena	—N/a	Fernando Daniel	Catarina Furtado
4	2023	Júlia Machado	Francisco Horta	Francisco Santos	Maria Pedro	Rodrigo Oliveira	Fernando Daniel	Catarina Furtado
5	2024	Victoria Nicole	Francisco Dias	Leonor Quinteiro	Maria Benedita	—N/a	Nininho Vaz Maia	Catarina Furtado
6	2025	Inês Gonçalves	Lara Martins	Maria Vinagre	Matilde Azevedo	—N/a	Miguel Cristovinho	Catarina Furtado
7	2026	Salvador Rio	Ana Rita Torres	Daniela Fontão	Vitória Fernandes	—N/a	Diogo Piçarra	Catarina Furtado

== Seasons' summary ==
Color key
Winner	Eliminated in the Live shows
Runner-up	Saved by another coach in the Battles
Third place	Eliminated in Battles
Eliminated in the Final

=== Season 1 (2014) ===
The first season of the series had three coaches: Anselmo Ralph, fadista Raquel Tavares, and internationally-known Brazilian singer, Daniela Mercury. Premiering on 28 September 2014, Mariana Monteiro and Vasco Palmeirim were the hosts for the season and Rui Maria Pêgo was the backstage host. On 14 December, the season ended with Diogo Garcia from Team Daniela declared as winner.

Coaching teams
Coaches	Artists					
Raquel Tavares						
Raquel Tavares	Filipa Ferreira	Salomé Silveira	Ana Rita Coelho	José Moreira	Alicia Correia	Carlos Pinheiro
Raquel Tavares	Inês Salgado	Andreia Santos	Carolina Mendes	Ana M. Rodrigues	Francisca Martins	Lúcia Mosca
Raquel Tavares	Carolina Macieira	Bárbara Pina	João Pinto	Mariana Aragão	Mariana Oliveira	Ariana Abreu
Anselmo Ralph						
Anselmo Ralph	Carolina Leite	Pedro Goulão	Carolina Martins	Marta Costa	Bárbara Bandeira	João Pereira
Anselmo Ralph	Matilde Leite	Isabel Schmidt	Gonçalo Mendes	Tiago Barbosa	Bruna Rita	Kevin Mariz
Anselmo Ralph	Sara Vieira	Marco Olival	Sofia Maldonado	Luana Velasques	Benvinda de Jesus	Inês Durão
Daniela Mercury						
Daniela Mercury	Diogo Garcia	Bruna Guerreiro	Ana Silva	Juliana Ignácio	Sara Monteiro	João P. Gonçalves
Daniela Mercury	Joana Pereira	Tatiana de Oliveira	Íris da Silva	Mariana Cardoso	Lara Escoval	Carina Rodrigues
Daniela Mercury	Diogo Santos	João Prior	Carolina Cardetas	Maria Marques	Sara Filipe	Inês Araújo

=== Season 2 (2021) ===
The second season of the series had Marisa Liz, hip hop singer Carlão, pop singer Carolina Deslandes, and adults' season four winner Fernando Daniel as coaches. Premiering on 10 January 2021, Catarina Furtado was the host for the season and actress Bárbara Lourenço was the backstage host for the auditions and battles. For the live shows, digital influencer Fábio Lopes replaced Lourenço. During the season finale, on 18 April, Furtado confirmed that the winner would represent Portugal in the Junior Eurovision Song Contest 2021. Simão Oliveira from Team Fernando won the season, and eight months later, represented Portugal with the song "O Rapaz", placing 11th with 101 points.

Coaching teams
Coaches	Artists					
Marisa Liz						
Marisa Liz	Aurora Pinto	Maria Inês	Lívia Barros	Madalena Castro	Leonor Carvalheira	Ana Veríssimo
Marisa Liz	~~Madalena Guedes~~	~~Nuno Siqueira~~	Matilde Barriga	Yasmin de Sousa	Inês Carvalho	Madalena Gil
Marisa Liz	Carlota Amorim	Maria Gil	Rita Bakker	Teresa Lobo		
Carlão						
Carlão	Mia Benita	Nuno Siqueira	Marina Maranhão	Afonso Silva	Alexandre Caldeira	Ísis Salgueiro
Carlão	~~Simão Oliveira~~	Matilde Matias	Yasmin Cruz	Laura Franco	Vítor Afonso	João Esteves
Carlão	Nina Alves	Leonor Barros	Noah Lisboa	Inês Vilela		
Carolina Deslandes						
Carolina Deslandes	Rita Rocha	Rosa Antunes	Madalena Guedes	Rúben Martins	Joana Lopes	Manuel Duarte
Carolina Deslandes	Juliana Campos	Rita Cavaco	Jaime Saavedra	Violetta Gurskaya	Carolina Silva	Fabiana Casais
Carolina Deslandes	Leonor Arroja	Catarina Amorim	Miguel Reis	Lara Guedes	Zoe & Jade	
Fernando Daniel						
Fernando Daniel	Simão Oliveira	Margarida Machado	Leonor Sá-Chaves	Mariana Leal	Fabiana Ferreira	Tomás Pascoal
Fernando Daniel	~~Ana Veríssimo~~	Júlia Ochôa	Margarida Cardoso	Tomás Esteves	Francisco Fernandes	Matilde Magalhães
Fernando Daniel	Inês Monteiro	Mara Marquitos	Beatriz Melo	Sandra Cró		
Note: Italicized names are stolen artists (names scratched through within former teams).

=== Season 3 (2022) ===
The third season of the series had Carlão, Daniel, Deslandes, and debutant Bárbara Tinoco as coaches. Premiering on 8 May 2022, Furtado returned as host and Lopes as the backstage host. On 31 July, 14-year-old Maria Gil from Team Fernando won the season. On 10 August, RTP announced that runner-up Nicolas Alves would represent Portugal in the Junior Eurovision Song Contest 2022, due to Gil being born in November 2007.

=== Season 4 (2023) ===
On 3 December 2022, applications for the fourth season of The Voice Kids opened. On 8 January 2023, during a live show of The Voice Portugal's tenth season, it was revealed that Aurea would replace Deslandes on the coaching panel, while Carlão, Daniel, and Tinoco would return. Furtado hosted the show for the third year in a row, while Catarina Maia was in charge of hosting the backstage. American-born Júlia Machado from Team Fernando won the season and represented Portugal in the Junior Eurovision Song Contest 2023.

=== Season 5 (2024) ===
On 15 January 2024, it was confirmed that Carlão and Tinoco would return as coaches for the fifth season. At the same time, it was confirmed that Cuca Roseta and Nininho Vaz Maia would replace Aurea and Daniel. Furtado hosted the show for the fourth year in a row, while Catarina Maia returned for her second year in charge of hosting the backstage. Victoria Nicole from Team Nininho won the season and represented Portugal in the Junior Eurovision Song Contest 2024. She finished in second place, Portugal's highest ever score.

=== Season 6 (2025) ===
On 21 January 2025, it was confirmed that of the coaches from the previous season, only Roseta would return. At the same time, it was revealed that Diogo Piçarra, who formerly served as a coach on the adult version of the show, would debut as a coach alongside Miguel Cristovinho and Nena. Furtado hosted the show for the fifth year in a row, while Maria Petronilho debuted as the backstage host. Inês Gonçalves from Team Cristo won the season and represented Portugal in the Junior Eurovision Song Contest 2025, finishing in thirteenth place.

=== Season 7 (2026) ===
On 1 April 2026, it was confirmed that Roseta, Piçarra, Cristovinho, and Nena would all return as coaches for the seventh season. This marks the first time since the series' inception that there has not been a panel change following the previous season. Furtado hosted the show for the sixth year in a row, while Maria Petronilho served as the backstage host for her second season. Salvador Rio from Team Diogo won the season and represented Portugal in the Junior Eurovision Song Contest 2026, finishing in thirteenth place.
