= Bispo (rapper) =

Portuguese rapper (born 1992)

- Born: Pedro Bispo; 12 April 1992 (age 34); Algueirão – Mem Martins, Portugal
- Origin: Algueirão, Mem Martins
- Genre: Hip hop tuga
- Occupations: Rapper, Singer-songwriter
- Instruments: Voice

Pedro Bispo (Algueirão – Mem Martins, Sintra, Portugal, 12 April 1992), known as simply Bispo, is a Portuguese rapper.

== Career ==
On the 16th of January 2020, Bispo announced that he started his own record label, Mentalidade Free, signing Ivandro as his first artist. They collaborated in the song "Essa saia", which has now been streamed more than 18 million times on Spotify.

He was invited by RTP to compose an entry for Festival da Canção 2024, the Portuguese selection for the Eurovision Song Contest 2024; he performed the song "Casa portuguesa" in the first semi-final on 24 February 2024, failing to qualify for the final.

== Discography ==
=== EP's ===
Title	Details
Bispoterapia	Released: 9 May 2014 (POR); Format: CD, Digital
Fora D'Horas	Released: 1 June 2017 (POR); Label: Format: CD, Digital
Mudanças	Released: 2021; Label: Format: CD, Digital

=== Albums ===
Title	Details
Desde a Origem	Released: 30 November 2015 (POR); Format: CD, Digital
Mais Antigo	Released: 13 March 2020 (POR); Format: CD, Digital

=== Singles ===
==== As lead artist ====
List of singles, with selected details and chart positions
Title	Year	Peak chart positions	Certifications	Album
Title	Year	POR	Certifications	Album
"Nós2" (feat. Deezy)	2018	9	AFP: Platinum	Non-album singles
"Essa Saia" (featuring Ivandro)	2019	1	AFP: Gold	Non-album singles
"Planeta" (with Bárbara Tinoco)	2023	1		Non-album singles
"Bênção" (with Mizzy Miles and Van Zee)	2024	1		Non-album singles
"—" denotes a recording that did not chart or was not released in that territory.

==== As featured artist ====
List of singles as featured artist, with selected chart positions and certifications
Title	Year	Peak chart positions	Certifications	Album
Title	Year	POR	Certifications	Album
"Com Licença" (Deejay Telio featuring Bispo)	2019	9	AFP: Gold	Karanganhada 3
"Tempo" (FrankieOnTheGuitar featuring Tóy Tóy T-Rex, Lon3r Johny and Bispo)	2020	20		Non-album single
"—" denotes a recording that did not chart or was not released in that territory.

== Awards and nominations ==
Year	Award	Nominee	Category	Result
2018	MTV Europe Music Award	Bispo	Best Portuguese Act	Nominated
2023	MTV Europe Music Award	Bispo	Best Portuguese Act	Won
