= Joaquim Furtado =

Portuguese journalist and television personality (born 1948)

- Born: Joaquim da Silva Furtado; 1948 (age 77–78); Penamacor, Portugal
- Occupations: Journalist; reporter; television personality; film director
- Employer: Rádio e Televisão de Portugal
- Children: Catarina Furtado (daughter)

Joaquim da Silva Furtado (born 1948) is a Portuguese journalist, reporter, television anchor and documentary film director. He worked during almost his entire career for state-run RTP television network, including in RTP 2 for many years.

He became a well-known media personality during the Carnation Revolution military coup on April 25, 1974. On the first hours of that day, he was working as a broadcaster in the Rádio Clube Português (RCP) radio station when the revolutionary Armed Forces Movement (MFA) took power in order to overthrow the Estado Novo regime, and Furtado read the first communiqué of the rebellious military officers.

In the 2000s he achieved wide popularity in Portugal after directing the documentary A Guerra, a thoroughly detailed description of the events around the Portuguese Colonial War (1961-1974). Joaquim Furtado is also the father of actress and television presenter Catarina Furtado.
