= Dillaz =

Portuguese rapper (born 1991)

- Born: André Filipe Chapelas Neto; 5 May 1991 (age 35); Alcabideche, Cascais, Portugal
- Genre: Hip hop tuga
- Occupations: Rapper, singer-songwriter, record producer
- Years active: 2011–present
- Labels: Seventy Five, Sony Music

André Filipe Chapelas Neto (born 5 May 1991), known by his stage name Dillaz, is a Portuguese rapper and record producer.

His third studio album, O Próprio (2024), reached number one on the Portuguese album chart and holds the record for the most streams on Spotify on its release day for an album from a Portuguese artist.

== Discography ==
=== Albums ===
Title	Details	Peak chart positions
Title	Details	POR
Reflexo	Released: 26 May 2016; Label: Seventy Five; Format: CD, digital	36
Oitavo Céu	Released: 1 April 2022; Label: Seventy Five; Format: CD, digital	58
O Próprio	Released: 16 February 2024; Label: Seventy Five, Sony Music; Format: CD, digital	1

=== Mixtapes ===
Title	Details
Sagrada Família Vol. 1	Released: 11 July 2011; Format: CD, digital
Sagrada Família Vol. 2	Released: 31 January 2013; Format: CD, digital

== Awards and nominations ==
Year	Award	Category	Work	Result
2024	MTV Europe Music Awards	Best Portuguese Act	Himself	Nominated
