= Nininho Vaz Maia =

Portuguese singer

- Born: Avelino Vaz Maia; 25 February 1988 (age 38); Lisbon, Portugal
- Genres: Flamenco pop
- Occupations: Singer; songwriter
- Instruments: Vocals; guitar
- Website: www.nininhovazmaia.com

Avelino Vaz Maia (born 25 February 1988), better known as Nininho Vaz Maia or Nininho, is a Portuguese singer and songwriter.

== Career ==
=== 2013–2020: Career beginnings ===
In 2013, Vaz Maia began to rise to prominence as a musician and composer. He began to compose his first musical themes inspired by pop music and flamenco. Firstly, he recorded a video performing a song to send to his sister. After seeing it, she showed it to her cousin who later shared it on the platform YouTube. After its release, the number of views on YouTube began to grow and an increasing number of fans began to follow the videos and songs he was composing and sharing. In the following years, Vaz Maia released eight singles, which continued to enhance his success as a musician.

=== 2021: Raízes ===
In 2021, Vaz Maia released his debut album, Raízes ("Roots" in Portuguese). As a whole, the album blended traditional flamenco music with pop elements. Vaz Maia worked with other prominent Portuguese musicians on the album, such as Rodrigo Carmo (Stego). In 2021, after the release of Raízes, Vaz Maia performed live, promoting singles from the album. Vaz Maia performed for the first time in Beja and Almeirim.

=== 2022–present: Continued recognition, Aparentemente - Vol 1, The Voice Kids and The Voice coach ===
In 2022, during a concert in Lisbon, Vaz Maia was presented with the recognition of Platinum level for Raízes. Additionally, one of the tracks in Raízes, "E Agora", was used by football player Cristiano Ronaldo on his social media. Ronaldo and Vaz Maia have since become friends, with Vaz Maia performing for Ronaldo at his events.

In 2023, Vaz Maia released Aparentemente - Vol 1, which contains seven tracks.

In January 2024, Vaz Maia was confirmed to be a coach on the fifth season of The Voice Kids Portugal alongside Carlão, Bárbara Tinoco, and Cuca Roseta. On 7 July 2024, Victória Nicole, an artist from his team, won the season, making Vaz Maia the winning coach in his first season. In June 2024, he was announced to be a coach on the twelfth season on the main version of the show, The Voice Portugal, alongside Fernando Daniel, Sónia Tavares, and Sara Correia. Vaz Maia coached his two final artists, Ricardo Maia and Rita Nunes, to second and third place, respectively.

== Artistry ==
Vaz Maia is regarded as an important figure for the flamenco pop genre in Portugal, as the genre is based in neighbouring Spain, with singers such as Rosalía representing it.

== Discography ==
=== Albums ===
List of studio albums, with selected details
Title	Details
Raízes	Released: 2 July 2021 (POR)
Aparentemente - Vol 1	Released: 24 November 2023 (POR)

=== Singles ===
List of singles, showing year released, and the name of the album
Title	Year	Album
"Tudo Passa"	2016	Non-album single(s)
"Eu Chorava"	2016	Non-album single(s)
"Cola-te a Mim"	2019	Non-album single(s)
"Quiero Bailar"	2019	Non-album single(s)
"Soy Gitano"	2019	Non-album single(s)
"Não Sou Perfeito"	2019	Non-album single(s)
"Saudade"	2020	Non-album single(s)
"El Tiempo"	2020	Non-album single(s)
"Nova Era"	2021	Raízes
"Onde Nasci"	2021	Raízes
"Hoje Estou Chateado"	2021	Raízes
"Gosto de Ti"	2021	Raízes
"Noiva"	2021	Raízes
"Não Vou"	2021	Raízes
"Aguenta Coração"	2021	Raízes
"Bailando"	2021	Raízes
"Pégate a Mi"	2021	Raízes
"Dime Porquê"	2021	Raízes
"E Agora"	2021	Raízes
"Te Quiero"	2023	Aparentemente - Vol 1
"Metamorfose"	2023	Aparentemente - Vol 1
"Suena que suena"	2023	Aparentemente - Vol 1
"A mi manera"	2023	Aparentemente - Vol 1
"Foste Embora"	2023	Aparentemente - Vol 1
"Volta"	2023	Aparentemente - Vol 1
"Bebé"	2023	Aparentemente - Vol 1
