= Gisela João =

Portuguese fado singer (born 1983)

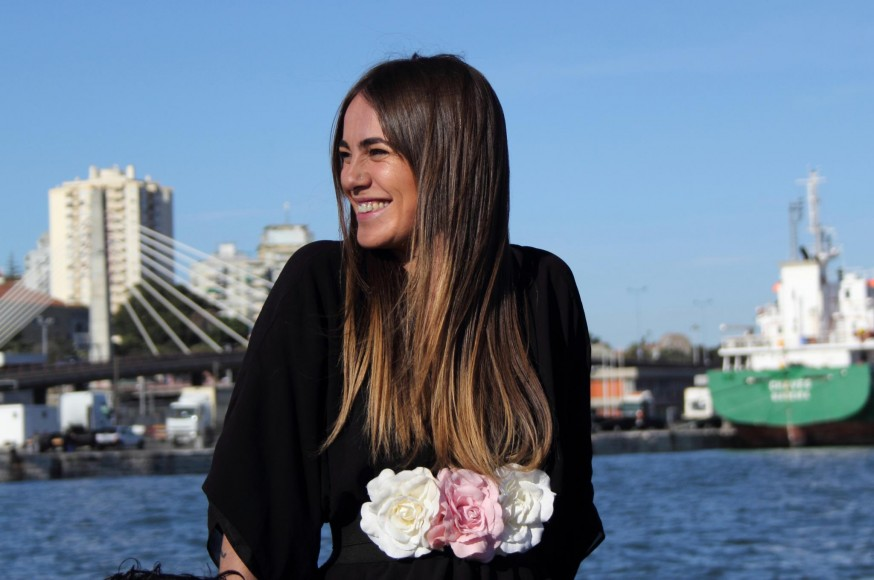
- Gisela João

Background information
- Born: Gisela João Gomes Remelho; November 6, 1983 (age 42); Barcelos
- Origin: Portugal
- Genres: Fado
- Occupation: Singer
- Label: HM Música
- Website: gisela-joao.pt

Gisela João Gomes Remelho (born November 6, 1983) is a Portuguese fado singer.

The album Gisela João was number one in Portugal and was Ípsilon/Público's and Blitz's record of the year.

== Early years ==
Born in Barcelos, João soon developed an interest and passion for fado, mainly when she reached 8 years old. By 2000, when she was 16/17 years old, João began to sing in "Adega Lusitana" in Barcelos. Soon after, she enrolled in a university in Porto to study design. It was during her sixth year in Porto that she further immersed in fado and the various fado houses that she sang in. Six years unfolded and João made her choice to settle in Lisbon, in an effort to further explore and develop herself as an artist and fado singer.

In 2009, she recorded an album with Atlantihda - a Portuguese band, hailing from Porto, that explores the various aspects of folk and world music, blending them with fado. After that album, she was invited to sing on 2011's "O Fado E As Canções do Alvim", an album by the historical Portuguese guitar player Fernando Alvim, frequent companion of the guitar player Carlos Paredes. The album showcases many of the voices and artists that represented fado in the 21st century, paying tribute to one of the most distinguished figures of the history of fado.

In her first years in Lisboa, she sang in various fado houses, especially in fado's quarter and "cradle", Mouraria. She gradually some popularity and played shows in CCB, Casa da Música, Lux, Festival Caixa Alfama and many more. The reporter António Pires described her one of the biggest newcomers of fado in recent years . She released her debut album with Frederico Pereira in 2012.

== 2013–2015: Debut album and international success ==
2013 would be João's breakthrough year. In July 2013, her debut album "Gisela João" was released to critical and commercial acclaim. It took two weeks for her album to reach the #1 spot of the Portuguese charts. She received the award for Best New Artist in the "Prémio Amália" Awards

Her quick climb to the top of the Portuguese charts, paired with the positive reviews from publications such as Blitz, Expresso, Público, Time Out and the website Cotonete, increased João's popularity with the Portuguese public. Live shows all around the country, from fado houses to bigger stages in festivals and more, paved the way for her sold-out shows in Casa da Música and in Centro Cultural de Belém. Soon after, she received the Award "Best Solo Interpreter" in the Globos de Ouro Award, and the Award "José Afonso 2014", with the jury considering her the "best voice to appear since Amália". In 2014, she began playing international shows.

She also performed live in Coliseu dos Recreios, Lisboa and in Coliseu do Porto, Portugal's iconic historical stages, for two sold-out shows. Those shows sparked a renewed interest in her album, which received then the "Platinum" record mark.

Once again playing international shows, João was invited to perform in new countries, including France, Belgium, England, Switzerland, Spain, Brazil, Germany, England, and many more. 2015 also marked her participation in the tribute album to Amália Rodrigues, entitled Amália: As Vozes do Fado, comprised with some of the most important names of fado, where she interprets the songs "Medo" and "Meu Amor, Meu Amor", in a duet with Camané.

By the end of 2015, João presented her live show "Caixinha de Música" (Musical Box), a program she devised for the Municipal Theatre São Luiz, where she lent her voice to honour some of the biggest and greatest poets and voices of the 20th century and beyond, interpreting songs from Serge Gainsbourg, Bryan Ferry, Nick Cave, Ella Fitzgerald, Violeta Parra, Leonard Cohen, Amy Winehouse, and more.

Her second album was scheduled to be released in 2016. In October 2016, João was confirmed to play at the 31st edition of Eurosonic Noorderslag in Groningen, NL.

In April 2026, João gave the Amadora for Hope benefit concert to support families in Marinha Grande affected by Storm Kristin.

== Discography ==
- Gisela João (Valentim de Carvalho, 2013)
- Gisela João - Ao Vivo (Valentim de Carvalo/Exclusivo Fnac, 2015)
- Nua (Valentim de Carvalho, 2016)
- Aurora (Universal Music Portugal, 2021)
- Inquieta (Universal Music Portugal, 2025)
