= Bárbara Tinoco =

Portuguese singer-songwriter (born 1998)

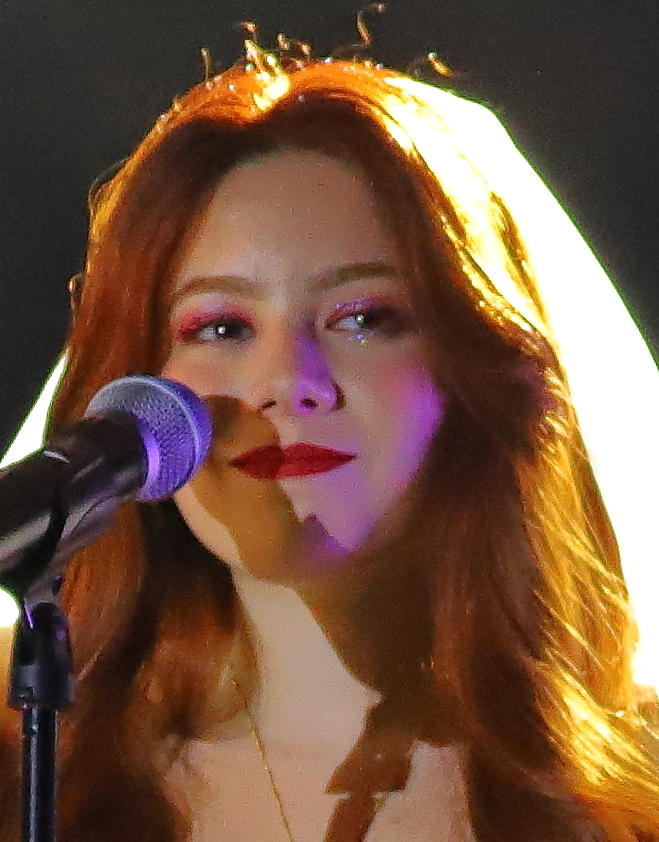
- Tinoco in 2024

Background information
- Born: Bárbara Isabel Machado Tinoco; 16 November 1998 (age 27); Amarante, Portugal
- Genres: Pop; indie pop
- Occupations: Singer; songwriter
- Instruments: Vocals; piano; cavaquinho
- Years active: 2018–present

Bárbara Isabel Machado Tinoco (pronounced [ˈbaɾβɐɾɐ tiˈnoku]) (born 16 November 1998) is a Portuguese singer and songwriter. She became known for her participation in the reality singing competition The Voice Portugal in 2018. Two years later, she reached 2nd place at the Festival RTP da Canção. In 2021, she won the Golden Globe for Best Vocal. From 2022 to 2024, Tinoco was a coach on The Voice Kids Portugal.

== Early life ==
Tinoco started learning piano at school with her teacher. Despite not being a professional musician, she had inherited the family business, a musical instrument store, where Barbara spent many hours as a child. Her first instrument was a cavaquinho, given to her by her grandfather. She has two younger sisters and her mother is an accountant. She enrolled at the Faculty of Social and Human Sciences, but it was in a masterclass given by João Gil for Antena 1 that she began to consider a path in music more seriously.

== Musical career ==
Tinoco took her first step towards stardom in 2018 when she decided to participate in the reality singing competition The Voice Portugal. During the Blind Audition, she sang a version of "Jolene" by Dolly Parton, but could not get any of the judges to turn their chairs. However, she was eventually challenged to sing one of her original themes. Composed by Tinoco when she was only 16 years old, "Antes Dela Dizer Que Sim" became a viral success, becoming her debut single, released the following year. Following her participation in the television program, Tinoco was approached by Pedro Barbosa, manager of artists such as Miguel Araújo and The Black Mamba, and it was from there that she turned professional. In 2019, she assured the first parts of the João Só tour concerts. In 2020, she was considered the Breakthrough Artist at PLAY - Portuguese Music Awards.

Tinoco participated in the RTP da Canção Festival in 2020, alongside Tiago Nacarato, who wrote and composed the contest theme, "Passe-Partout". The theme won the public vote, but the final result placed Elisa as the winner. Tinoco's interpretation reached 18 points, two less than the winning theme. In 2021, she released the first extended records. Published in April, Desalinhados is an EP of collaborations in which each theme has a different guest: António Zambujo, Carolina Deslandes, Diana Martinez, Tyoz, Bárbara Bandeira and Carlão. In October, she released her debut album, Bárbara, and the album included several singles released until then. She debuted at a festival, performing at Rock In Rio Lisboa in 2022.

In 2022, four years after her unsuccessful The Voice Portugal audition, Tinoco became a coach on The Voice Kids Portugal. She returned for her second season as a coach in 2023 and her third in 2024. She did not return in 2025 and was replaced by Nena.

== Musical style ==
Tinoco listed Miguel Araújo, Suzanne Vega and Julia Michaels as some of her musical influences.

== Personal life ==
Tinoco is a fan of the board game Catan. In February 2025, Tinoco announced that she was pregnant with her first child. On 14 May 2025, she gave birth to her daughter, Masha.

== Discography ==
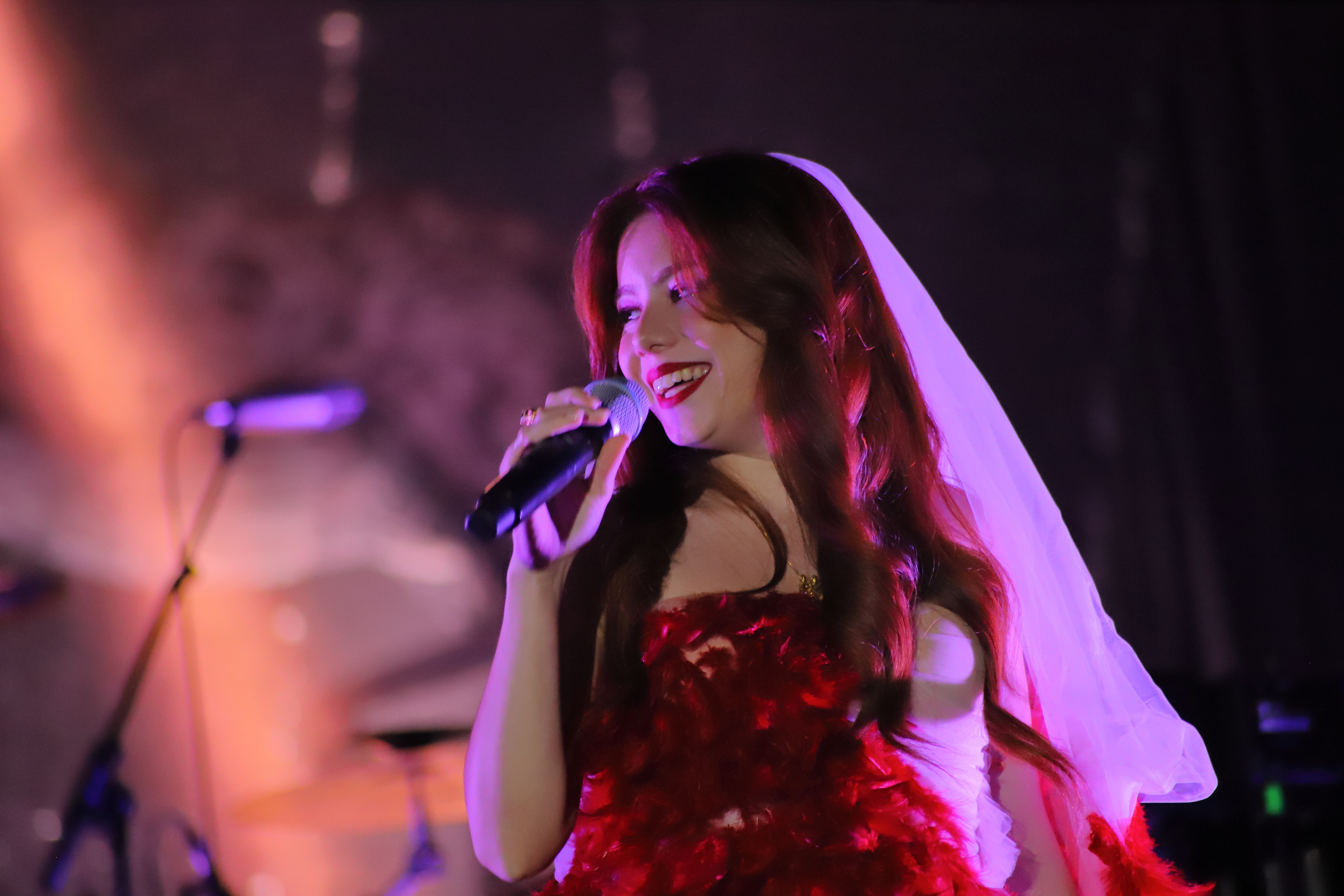
Tinoco performing in 2024

=== Studio albums ===
- 2021 – Bárbara
- 2023 – Bichinho
- 2024 – A Madrugada Que Eu Esperava (with Carolina Deslandes)
- 2024 – Bichinho (para onde vai o amor?)
- 2026 - HORMONAL

=== EP ===
- 2021 – Desalinhados

=== Singles ===
- 2019 – Antes dela dizer que sim
- 2019 – A fugir de ser
- 2019 – Sei lá
- 2020 – Se o mundo acabar
- 2020 – Outras línguas
- 2020 – Um Natal Unibanco
- 2021 – Cidade (featuring Bárbara Bandeira)
- 2022 – Eu te amo (featuring Lagum)
- 2022 – Chamada não atendida
- 2023 – Querido ex-namorado
