= Nena (Portuguese singer) =

Portuguese singer

- Born: Madalena Maria Marques; 6 February 1997 (age 29); Lisbon, Portugal
- Genres: Pop, Folk Pop, Indie Pop
- Occupations: Singer; songwriter
- Instruments: Vocals
- Years active: 2019–present

Madalena Maria Marques, known professionally as Nena, is a Portuguese singer. Nena rose to national attention after finishing tenth in Festival da Canção 2024, the contest used to select the artist representing Portugal Eurovision Song Contest.

== Career ==
=== 2019–2022: Career beginnings and ao fundo da rua ===
After wanting to pursue music since the age of 12, Nena began recording in 2019 and released her first single, "portas do sol", in 2020. The song served as the lead single to her debut album which was released in 2022. In the song, Nena details growing up in Lisbon. The song has accumulated over 9.1 million views on YouTube. Nena released her first, and to date only, album on 18 November 2022 titled ao funda rua. The album features ten singles.

=== 2023–present: Further releases, Festival da Canção, and The Voice Kids coach ===
In 2023, Nena released the non-album single "os croquetes acabam". The following year, she released the single "Lembras-te de mim?" with Carolina de Deus.

In 2024, Nena was one of twenty-two artists from Portugal to be selected to participate in the contest Festival da Canção. The festival chooses the artist to represent Portugal in the Eurovision Song Contest each year. In the contest, Nena performed her original song "Teorias da Conspiração". After finishing in third place in her respective semi-final, Nena reached the final where she finished in tenth place overall. The festival boosted Nena's popularity in Portugal.

On 3 January 2025, Nena released "À Espera Do Fim" with the winner of season 8 of The Voice Portugal, Luís Trigacheiro. On 21 January 2025, Nena was confirmed to be a coach on the sixth season of The Voice Kids Portugal alongside Cuca Roseta, Diogo Piçarra, and Miguel Cristovinho.

== Discography ==
=== Albums ===
List of studio albums, with selected details
Title	Details
ao fundo da rua	Released: 18 November 2022 (POR)

=== Singles ===
List of singles, showing year released, and the name of the album
Title	Year	Album
"portas do sol"	2020	ao fundo da rua
"sou só eu?"	2022	ao fundo da rua
"passo a passo"	2022	ao fundo da rua
"do meu ao teu correio"	2022	ao fundo da rua
"santo popular"	2022	ao fundo da rua
"mi depois do ré"	2022	ao fundo da rua
"segui"	2022	ao fundo da rua
"não vás"	2022	ao fundo da rua
"café da esplanada"	2022	ao fundo da rua
"boa noite"	2022	ao fundo da rua
"os croquetes acabam"	2023	Non-album single(s)
"Lembras-te de mim?" (feat. Carolina de Deus)	2024	Non-album single(s)
"À Espera Do Fim" (feat. Luís Trigacheiro)	2025	Non-album single(s)
