= Mickael Carreira =

Portuguese pop singer and songwriter

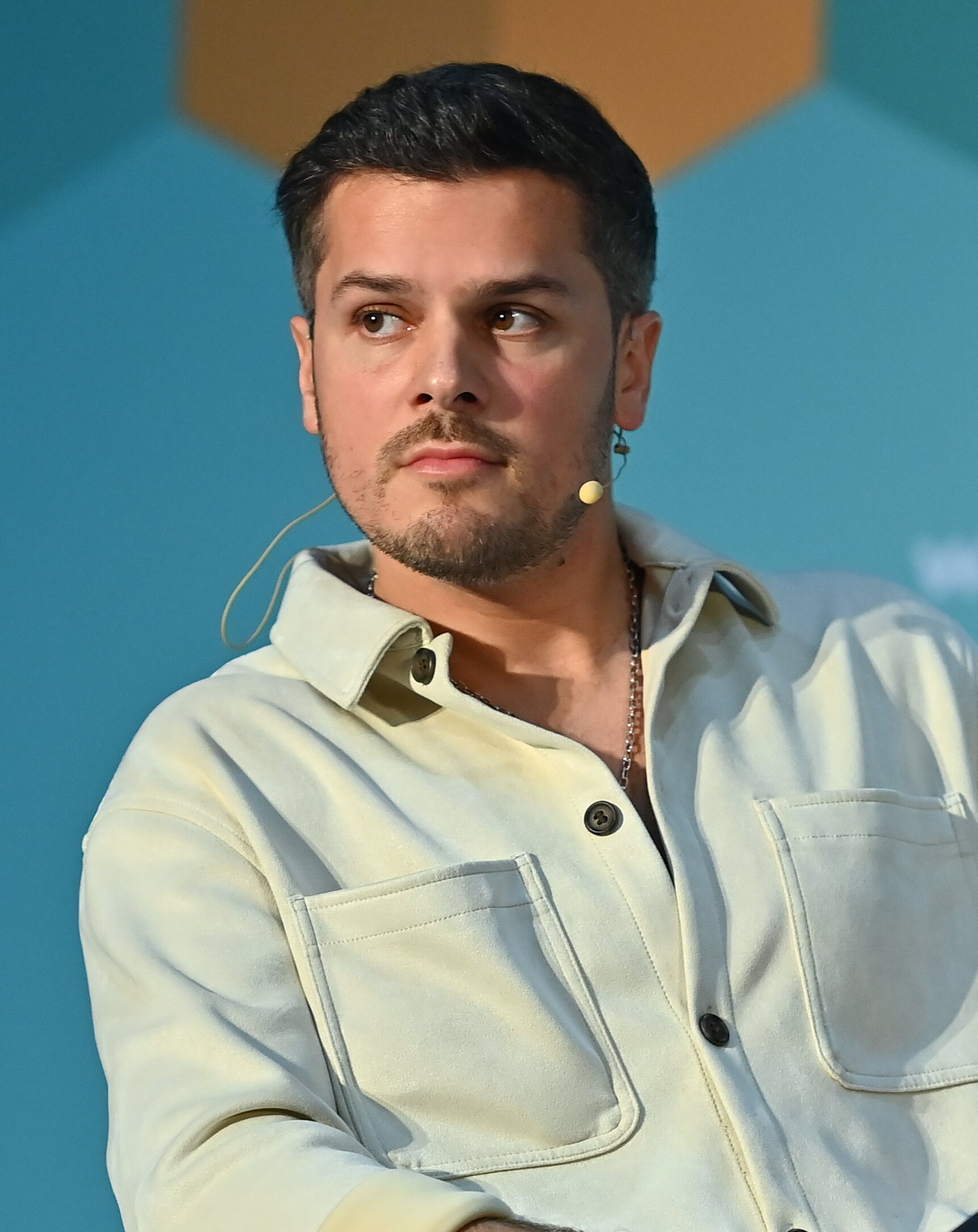
- Carreira in 2022
- Born: 3 April 1986 (age 40); Dourdan, France
- Occupation: Singer
- Years active: 2006–present
- Father: Tony Carreira
- Website: www.mickaelcarreira.com

Mickael Carreira (born Mickael Araújo Antunes on 3 April 1986) is a Portuguese pop singer and songwriter. He is most famous for his ballads and the romanticism of his songs made him one of the best selling artists in Portugal. In total, his albums were certified platinum nine times. Over the course of his career, Mickael has collaborated with such international artists as Anggun, Enrique Iglesias and Sebastián Yatra.

Mickael is the eldest son of the singer Tony Carreira and took his stage name from his father.

== Biography ==
Mickael Carreira is the son of the Portuguese singer Tony Carreira and Fernanda Araújo. His brother is the singer David Carreira and his younger sister Sara, who died in car accident, was also a celebrity and singer.

Mickael was born in the town of Dourdan belonging to the metropolitan area of Paris. He spent his childhood in France until his family decided to move to Portugal when he was 15. It was at that age that he began writing songs.

In 2001, Mickael made his concert debut as he sang together with his father in the Olympia Hall in Paris. By that time Mickael already had a musical background having attended a conservatory where he learnt to play the piano. In addition to that, Mickael took guitar lessons, his first teacher being his father. Upon graduating from Lycée français, Mickael started working in a studio recording songs. His first album, Mickael, was released in 2006 and was rapidly certified triple platinum. During his very first tour Mickael gave over 100 concerts.

In 2007, he received the Globo de Ouro award for "Revelation Artist in Music" Portuguese media describing his success as 'supersonic'.

In 2009, Mickael recorded his first duet collaborating with the Indonesian singer Anggun on the song Chama por me (Call My Name). In 2012, he released his 4th studio album Viver a Vida produced by Rudy Pérez and Julio Reyes Copello who worked with such artists as Jennifer Lopez, Beyoncé, Christina Aguilera, Pitbull, Ricky Martin, Marc Anthony and Nelly Furtado. In 2014, together with Enrique Iglesias, Mickael recorded the Portuguese version of the song Bailando, which became an instant hit in Portugal. Mickael's most recent album, Instinto, was released in 2016.

From 2014 to 2018 he was a coach on The Voice Portugal and had two wins: in 2015 with Deolinda Kinzimba and in 2016 with Fernando Daniel. He returned to the show in 2026 as a duo coach with his brother, David.

In 2015, Mickael launched his eponymous perfume, Mickael Carreira, in partnership with the German company LR Health & Beauty.

In addition to Portuguese and French, Mickael is fluent in Spanish. He released three singles in this language including Yo Puedo Esperar, one of the themes of the Mexican TV series Por siempre mi amor.

In 2017, Mickael recorded the song Ya Ya Ya together with the Colombian singer Sebastián Yatra.

Since 2022, he served as a coach on the Portuguese version of The Voice Generations.

== Personal life ==
Since 2012, Mickael's partner has been the presenter and actress Laura Figueiredo. In March 2017, they became parents to a daughter, Beatriz, to whom Mickael dedicated his song O teu lugar. In July 2023, they became parents again, this time to a boy, Gabriel.

== Discography ==
=== Studio albums ===
Release date	Name	Position AFP Album Chart	Record label	Format and tracks	Certification	Sales
14 July 2006	Mickael	2	Vidisco	1 CD (12 tracks)	3× Platinum	60 000
12 January 2008	Entre Nós	2	Vidisco	2 CD (CD1=13 tracks CD2 (videos) 4 tracks)	POR: 1 disc gold; 1 disc platinum	30 000
20 May 2009	Tudo o que Sonhei	2	Farol Música	1 CD + 1 DVD (CD 13 tracks, DVD 2 tracks)	POR: Platinum	20,000
7 May 2012	Viver a Vida	2	Espacial Musica	1 CD (12 tracks)	POR: Platinum	15,000
24 November 2014	Sem Olhar Para Trás	3	Warner Music	1 CD (12 tracks)	POR: Platinum	15,000
11 November 2016	Instinto	3	Universal Music	1 CD (12 tracks)	POR: Gold	7,500

Special album editions

- 2007: Mickael (Special Edition) – 1 CD + 1 DVD (15 tracks)
- 2007: Entre Nós (Special Edition) – 1 CD + 1 DVD (CD=14 tracks, DVD 6 tracks

=== Live albums ===
Year	Title	Position AFP Album Chart	Record label	Format	Certification	Sales
2010	Mickael ao Vivo no Coliseu de Lisboa	1	Farol Música	2 CD + 1 DVD (CD1 10 tracks, CD2 10 tracks)	platinum	15,000

=== Singles ===
Leading artist
Year	Title	Position	Album
Year	Title	PT	Album
2006	"Depois Dessa Noite"	1	Mickael
2006	"Dou a Vida Por Ti"	1	Mickael
2007	"Não Me Esqueço de Ti"	1	Entre Nós
2007	"Outra Noite Contigo"	1	Entre Nós
2009	"Podem Passar Mil Anos"	2	Tudo O Que Eu Sonhei
2009	"Chama Por Mim"	4	Tudo O Que Eu Sonhei
2010	"O Que Vai Ser de Nós"	1	Ao Vivo no Coliseu de Lisboa
2010	"Como Uma Tatuagem"	1	Ao Vivo no Coliseu de Lisboa
2012	"Dança Comigo"	1	Viver a Vida
2012	"Volto a Ti" (with Rita Guerra)	2	Viver a Vida
2012	"Viver a Vida"	2	Viver a Vida
2012	"Porque Ainda Te Amo"	2	Viver a Vida
2014	"Tudo O Que Quiseres" (with B4)	1	Sem Olhar Para Trás
2016	"Fácil"	7	Instinto
2016	"Imaginamos"	37	Instinto

Promotional singles
Year	Title	Album
2013	"Yo puedo esperar"	—N/a
2014	"La Despedida"	—N/a
2016	"Así"	—N/a

As a featuring artist
Year	Title	Album
2014	"Bailando" (Portuguese version) (Enrique Iglesias featuring Mickael Carreira, Descemer Bueno, Gente De Zona)	Sex and Love

=== Tours ===
- 2007: 1ª digressão (meaning tour)
- 2008: Tour Entre Nós
- 2009: 3ª digressão
- 2010: 4ª digressão
- 2011: 5ª digressão
- 2012: Tour Viver a Vida
- 2015: Tour Bailando
- 2016: M Tour – 10 Anos de Carreira

== Interesting facts ==
- Mickael is known as "the Portuguese Enrique Iglesias".
- As a kid, Mickael took singing lessons from the same teacher that taught Sebastián Yatra.
