= Catarina Furtado =

Portuguese TV presenter and actress

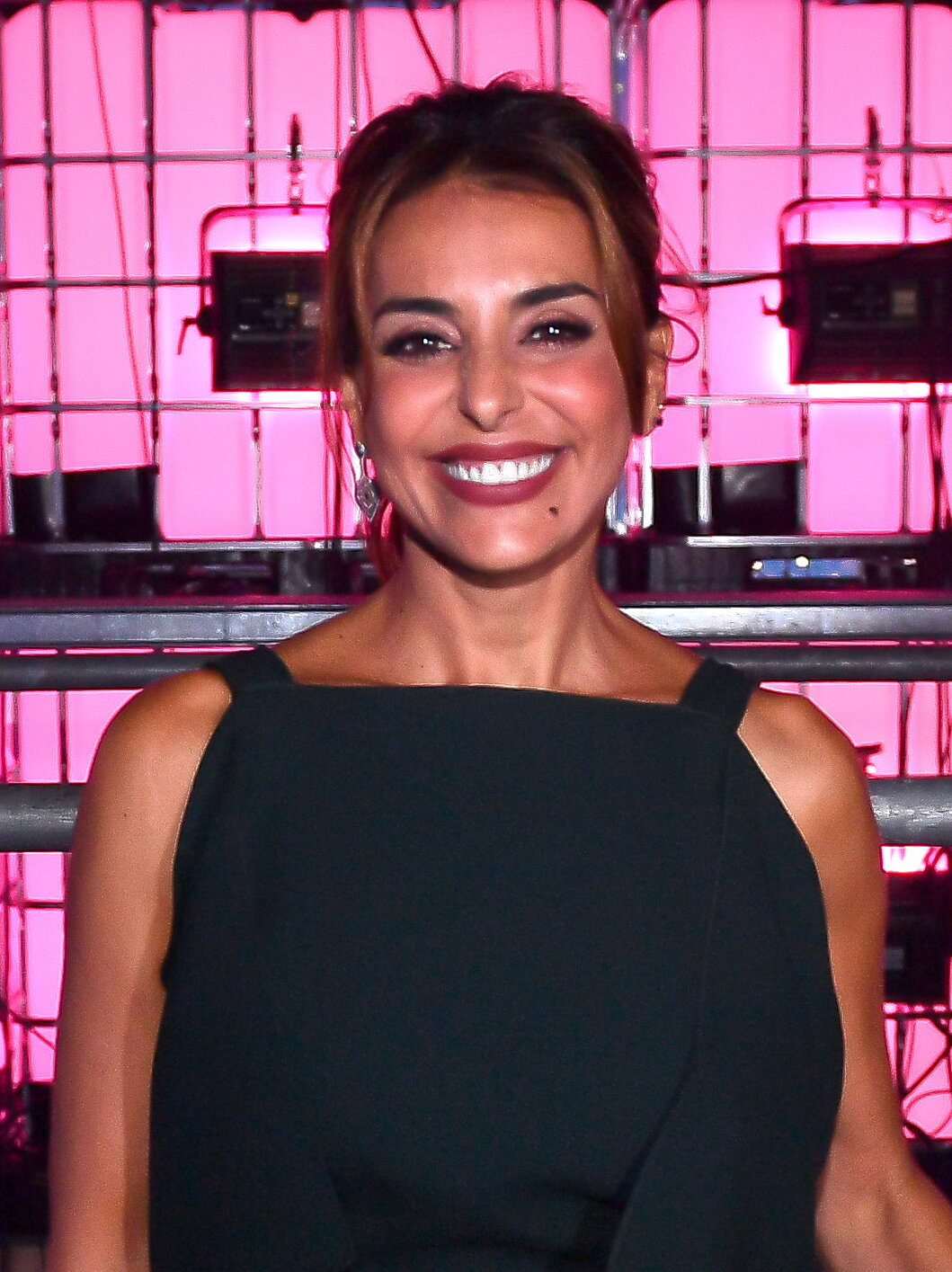
- Furtado in 2021
- Born: Catarina Cardoso Garcia da Fonseca Furtado; 25 August 1972 (age 53); Lisbon, Portugal
- Occupations: Television presenter; actress
- Years active: 1991–present
- Partner: João Reis (m. 2005; div. 2023)
- Children: 2
- Father: Joaquim Furtado

Catarina Cardoso Garcia da Fonseca Furtado (born 25 August 1972) is a Portuguese television presenter, actress and UNFPA Goodwill Ambassador. Since 2011 she has been known for being the presenter of the music program The Voice Portugal on the television channel RTP1.

== Career ==
Throughout her career on television which started in the early 1990s, Furtado has worked for SIC and RTP television networks, as well as the radio stations Rádio Comercial and RDP Antena 3. While an underage girl, she had a short non-talking role in the film Non, ou a Vã Glória de Mandar directed by Manoel de Oliveira. Later on she starred in films like Killing Time (an English film that appeared in the Cannes Film Festival), Fatima (an Italian movie by Fabrizio Costa), Anjo da Guarda and Pesadelo cor-de-rosa, among others.

Furtado's first big success was as a presenter on the TV show Top + on RTP, a Portuguese program featuring popular music videos and the national weekly record chart. It was a music show that led to her hosting an MTV program on the SIC network, years before Portuguese MTV was founded. She went on to do a variety of shows, including Treasure Hunt (Caça ao Tesouro), on SIC television, which was often shot on location in Portugal's smaller towns, where Catarina arrived in a helicopter.

On 8 January 2018, Furtado was announced as one of the four hosts of the 2018 Eurovision Song Contest alongside Sílvia Alberto, Daniela Ruah, and Filomena Cautela.

== Personal life ==
Furtado is of Goan descent through her mother. Her great-great-grandfather was born in Candolim, Portuguese Goa.

Furtado attended the Conservatório Nacional (until 1990) specializing in dance. She also trained in journalism and studied drama at London's International School of Acting from 1995 to 1997, as well as Lee Strasberg's Method Studio in England. She was married to João Reis, an actor, from 2005 to 2023 and has a daughter, Maria Beatriz (born in 2006) and a son, João Maria (born in 2007).

Furtado is rated on the site AskMen.com.

== Filmography ==
=== Films and television ===
- Eurovision Song Contest 2018
- Filhos do Rock (2013–14)
- The Voice Portugal (2011–present)
- Cidade Despida (2010)
- Dá-me Música
- A minha geração (2008)
- Dança Comigo (2006–07)
- Pequenos em Grande (2005)
- Operação Triunfo (2003)
- Pequenos e Terríveis (1999)
- Uma Noite de Sonho (1995)
- Caça ao Tesouro (1994)
- Chuva de Estrelas (1993)
- MTV Portugal (1992)
- Top + (1991/1992)
- Gala Globos de Ouro
- As Mais Belas Canções de Natal
- SIC No País do Natal
- Gala Portugal Fashion
- Uma Aventura
- O Lampião da Estrela
- Catarina.com
- Fátima
- A Ferreirinha
- Natal dos Hospitais
