= Marisa Liz =

Portuguese vocalist

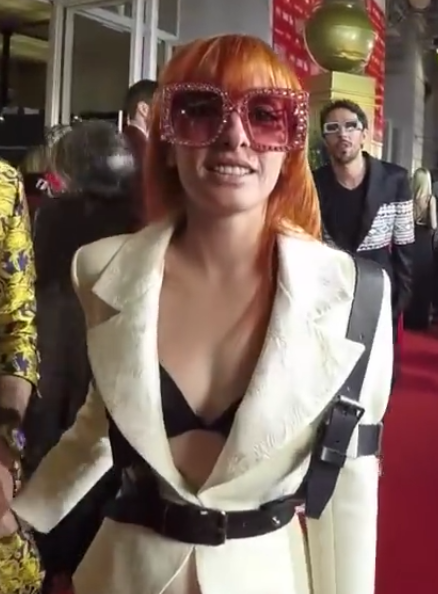
- Marisa Liz in 2017

Background information
- Born: Marisa Pinto de Oliveira Pinto; 22 October 1982 (age 43); Lisbon, Portugal
- Genres: Pop rock; Electronic music

Marisa Liz or Marisa Pinto (born 22 October 1982) is the lead singer of the Portuguese pop rock band Amor Electro. The band's repertoire combines rock music and electronic music with traditional Portuguese music.

== Biography ==
Marisa was born on October 22, 1982, in Lisbon, Portugal.

She participated in programs such as Bravo Bravissimo and Os Principais. She began her musical career in children's bands such as Popeline and Onda Choc.

In 2002, she played the Portuguese adaptation to the music of the Disney Channel series Kim Possible.

Between 2003 and 2009, Marisa was part of Donna Maria, a band with Miguel Ângelo Majer and Ricardo Santos who left in order to begin a solo career.

She participated in the tribute show honoring Simone de Oliveira's 50-year career, Num País Chamado Simone (In a Country Called Simone), held at the Coliseu dos Recreios in Lisbon in 2008.

In 2009, Marisa left Donna Maria to continue her solo career.

In the first days of 2010 she appeared as the lead singer of a new electro-pop band, the "Catwalk", on the schedule of shows at Casino Estoril.

She thereafter introduced herself as Marisa Liz.

Marisa participated in Júlio Pereira's 2010 album Graffiti along with Sara Tavares, Dulce Pontes, Manuela Azevedo and Maria João.

In 2010, she appeared at the SIC (Sociedade Independente de Comunicação) Gala de Natal (Christmas Gala) with her group Amor Electro where they performed the single "A Máquina (Acordou)".

Marisa played the Portuguese adaptation to the music of the animated Italian film Winx Club 3D: Magica avventura. The film premiered on 31 March 2011. In November of that same year, the band Amor Electro reached platinum with their debut album.

From 2014 to 2023, she was a coach on The Voice Portugal. She won the show four times with competitors Tomás Adrião, Marvi, Luís Trigacheiro, and Gustavo Reinas. In 2021, she served as a coach on The Voice Kids. In 2025, Liz debuted as a coach on The Voice Gerações (the generations version of the show). In 2026, she was the winning coach when her group Os En'Canta Modas won the season.

In 2019 she formed, together with Áurea, the Elas project.

== Personal life ==
Marisa Liz had an 18-year-long relationship with Tiago Pais Dias with whom she had two children, Beatriz and João Tiago. The couple parted ways in January 2020. In the course of the same year, it was rumored that she had started a relationship with her co-host Áurea. Both Marisa and Áurea denied the rumours. In 2021, Marisa started dating actor Diogo Branco. She also announced that she was diagnosed with attention deficit hyperactivity disorder (ADHD).
