= Anselmo Ralph =

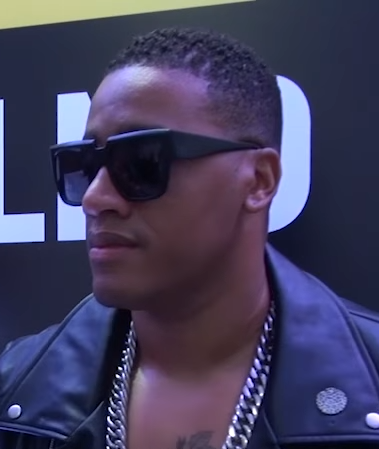
- Ralph in 2017

Background information
- Born: Anselmo Ralf Andrade Cordeiro; March 12, 1981 (age 45); Luanda, Angola
- Genres: R&B/Ghetto-Zouk
- Occupations: Singer
- Instruments: Vocals
- Years active: 2005–present

Anselmo Ralf Andrade Cordeiro (born March 12, 1981), better known as Anselmo Ralph, is an Angolan singer. He is one of the better internationally known Angolan singers and is commonly known for producing romantic songs.

== Biography ==
Anselmo Ralph was born in Luanda on March 12, 1981. He completed his elementary and high-school years in Angola then migrated to New York to finish college. He majored in Accounting at Borough of Manhattan Community College.

The singer is married to Madlice Castro since 2008, with whom he has two children, Alicia and Jason.

== Career ==
In 1991 and 1992, he resided in Madrid and was greatly influenced by Dominican singer Juan Luis Guerra. In 1995, he returned to Angola forming the hip hop group NGB (standing for Nova Geração Bantu). The group released the album Tá-se Bem the following year on EP Studios (EP standing for Eduardo Paím), although various financial difficulties hampered distribution which lagged until 1999.

In 2000, he returned to New York to try to make it in the States. He was part of a Latin rock band singing in Spanish for the American Latin market, but with limited success again because of disputes with record labels and promoters. In 2001, he also tried promoting songs in English, finding some appeal with universities and religious associations, but no commercial success.

Disappointed he returned to Angola in 2003, working on his Portuguese language album Histórias de Amor, destined for local Angolan and Portuguese markets. The album was mostly produced by Angolan R&B producer Aires Francisco aka Aires no Beat on the label Bom Som was an immediate success in 2006 in both markets. His concert tour attracted record numbers approaching 6–7 thousand. He was nominated by the Channel O Music Video Awards in the "Best R & B" and "Best Director" categories, and he won the MTV Europe Music Awards 2006 in the "Best African Artist" category. He received the award during a gala in Copenhagen.

After the critical and commercial success, he released the follow-up and equally successful album As Ultimas Historias de Amor in February 2007 on St. Valentine including the single "Um Dois". For the album, he won "Best Male Voice" by Rádio Luanda in 2007. Appearing with a great number of international artists from Europe and Africa, he was signed to the major Angolan label LS Produções for a three-album deal.

On February 14, 2009, he released his third album O Cupido (as a double CD and DVD), produced by Aires (Aires no Beat), recorded in Bom Som Studios as well as in South African Jazzworx and mastered by Mike Manitshana. Promotional concert on Pavilhão Da Cidadela attracted more than 40,000 in 2 days.

Anselmo Ralph pre-released his maxi single "A Dor do Cupido" in 2011 that was certified four time platinum in Portugal. The fourth album A Dor do Cupido was released in March 2011 in collaboration with the Swiss Klasszik label and producers Nellson Klasszik and Dji Tafinha. Hit singles from the album included "Não Me Toca","Animal", "Está Dificil", "Recuar" and "O Que é Que Andianta" Feat Bruno M. He gave more than 50 concerts to promote the album. It has reached number 2 on the Portuguese Albums Chart. The song Não Me Toca reached number 2 on the Portuguese singles chart.

In 2012, he participated in the collective musical project "Team De Sonho" (literally The Dream Team" in Portuguese), singing on 5 of the 17-track release. The collective gave two big concerts in Johannesburg and Maputo.

He also released his own compilation Best of Anselmo Ralph with one unpublished song as potential single titled "Sem Ti" engaging in a further tour in Angola. Best of Anselmo Ralph, reached number 5 position on the Portugal Albums Top 30 chart. In 2015, Ralph signed on with Sony Music to record three albums in Spanish with the first record set to be released in 2016.

From 2014 to 2018, Anselmo Ralph was a coach on The Voice Portugal, broadcast on RTP 1. In 2014, he was also a coach on The Voice Kids Portugal, the junior version of The Voice Portugal. He returned as a coach on The Voice Generations, serving on the panel for four seasons since 2022.

== In popular culture ==
In 2012, Coca-Cola announced a promotional campaign featuring Ralph, their first with an Angolan artist.

Anselmo Ralph and Anna Joyce interpreted the first Angolan Christmas music, in an initiative of the mobile operator Unitel.

== Awards and nominations ==
Ralph was nominated in the Best Male category and Best Lusophone category at the 2014 MTV Africa Music Awards and won the Best Lusophone category.

Anselmo Ralph gave the President of Angola, José Eduardo dos Santos, the first platinum record conquered by an Angolan in Portugal.

The latest singer's music album "O Melhor de Anselmo Ralph" (2014) reached the gold disc in Portugal, in just two weeks.

At the 2014 Angola Music Awards he won Album of the Year for "A Dor do Cupido", Best Male Artist, and Best R&B/Soul for "Única Mulher".

== Discography ==
=== Albums ===
- 2004: Anselmo (Demo)
- 2006: Historias de Amor
- 2007: As Ultimas Historias de Amor (Special edition)
- 2009: O Cupido
- 2011: A Dor do Cupido EP
- 2012: Best of Anselmo Ralph
- 2013: A Dor do Cupido
- 2016: Amor é Cego
- 2020: Momentos
- 2022: Viagens (EP)

=== Singles ===
- 2007: "Um Dois"
- 2011: "A Dor do Cupido"
- 2011: "Atira Água" (feat. Nelson Freitas & Eddy Parker)
- 2012: "Não Me Toca" (#2 in Portugal)
- 2013: "Única Mulher"
- 2015: " O Teu Crime é só Um"

=== Appearances ===
- 2012: Team De Sonho
  - "Tarde Demais" (with Lukeny Fortunato, Kennedy Ribeiro)
  - "Curtição" (Anselmo Ralph)
  - "Quero de Volta" (Anselmo Ralph)
  - "Amor Errado" (Anselmo Ralph feat. Pérola)
  - "Sou Sortudo" (Zona feat. Anselmo Ralph)

Various

- Lizha James feat. Anselmo Ralph – "Vais Rochar"
- David Carreira feat. Anselmo Ralph – "Baby Fica"
- Claudia Leitte feat. Anselmo Ralph – "Largadinho"
- Genesis feat. Anselmo Ralph – "Amor Novo"
- Kalibrados feat. Anselmo Ralph & Big Nelo – "Te Amo"
- Triofam feat. Anselmo Ralph – "Fazer Amor"
- Leo feat. Anselmo Ralph – "Coisa Rara" (2009)
- Ruben Shine feat. Anselmo Ralph – "Quero Te De Volta" (Remix)
- Dream Boyz feat. Anselmo Ralph – "Pop Champagne"
- Enciclopédia Negra feat. Anselmo Ralph – "Cansei De Ti"
- Big Nelo feat. Anselmo Ralph – "Me Conduz"
- Cage One feat. Anselmo Ralph – "Oh Oh Oh"
- Dani & Abdiel feat. Anselmo Ralph – "Dialogo"
- Alexandre Pires feat. Anselmo Ralph – "Yola Araujo – A Deus Eu Peço" (2008)
- Anselmo Ralph & Sandocan – "Whisky Cola" (2009)
- Caló Pascoal feat. Anselmo Ralph – "Será Sempre Minha" (2010)
- Banda Calypso feat. Anselmo Ralph – "Som Da África" (2011)
- JD & Anselmo Ralph – "Ela Dança" (2011)
- Os Vagabanda feat. Anselmo Ralph – "Não Fatiga Não" (2013)
- Zona 5 feat. Anselmo Ralph – "Sou Sortudo"
- Dji Tafinha feat. Anselmo Ralph – "O Próprio Uí"
- Nelson Freitas feat. Anselmo Ralph – "Drinks on Me" (2013)
- Paulo Gonzo feat. Anselmo Ralph – "Ela É" (2013)
- Mastiksoul feat. Anselmo Ralph – "In Love"
- Léo Santana feat. Anselmo Ralph – "Fenômeno"
- Zona 5 feat. Anselmo Ralph – "Encardir a Área" (2013)
- Kataleya feat. Anselmo Ralph – "Atrevimento" (2014)
- David Carreira feat. Anselmo Ralph – "Baby Fica"
- Nelson Freitas feat. Anselmo Ralph & Eddy Parker – "Atira Água"
- Dji Tafinha feat. Anselmo Ralph – "Na Lua"
- Supremos feat. Anselmo Ralph – "Fala Miúda"
- Lavilson feat. Anselmo - "Amizade" (Remix)
- Jello Swee feat. Anselmo Ralph - "Vitoria"
