= The Voice Portugal season 12 =

The Voice Portugal
- Season 12
- Hosted by: Catarina Furtado; Maria Petronilho (backstage)
- Coaches: Fernando Daniel; Sónia Tavares; Nininho Vaz Maia; Sara Correia
- No. of contestants: 68
- Winner: Rafael Ribeiro
- Winning coach: Fernando Daniel
- Runner-up: Ricardo Maia

Release
- Original network: RTP1
- Original release: 22 September 2024 – 5 January 2025

Season chronology
- ← Previous; Season 11 Next → Season 13

The twelfth season of The Voice Portugal is a talent show broadcast on RTP1, which premiered on 22 September 2024. Fernando Daniel, Sara Correia, and Sónia Tavares all returned as coaches from the previous season. Nininho Vaz Maia, who made his debut as a coach on the fifth season of The Voice Kids, joined the panel this season, replacing António Zambujo. Catarina Furtado returned as the main hostess, while Catarina Maia was replaced by Maria Petronilho as the backstage hostess.

Rafael Ribeiro from Team Fernando won the competition on 5 January 2025, marking Fernando Daniel's first win as a coach on the main version of the show. With Daniel winning three seasons on the kids version of the show, he became the second coach to win four seasons across all variations of the Portuguese version of The Voice, after Marisa Liz. For the first time in the show's history, the first artist in the Blind Auditions went on to win the entire season.

== Coaches ==
Coaches of The Voice Portugal season 12

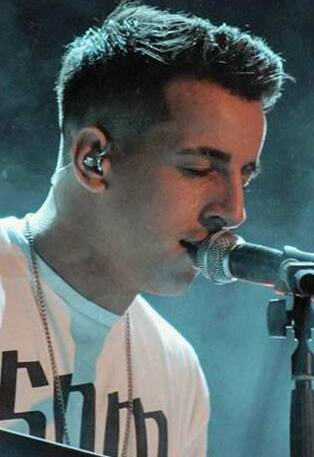
Fernando Daniel

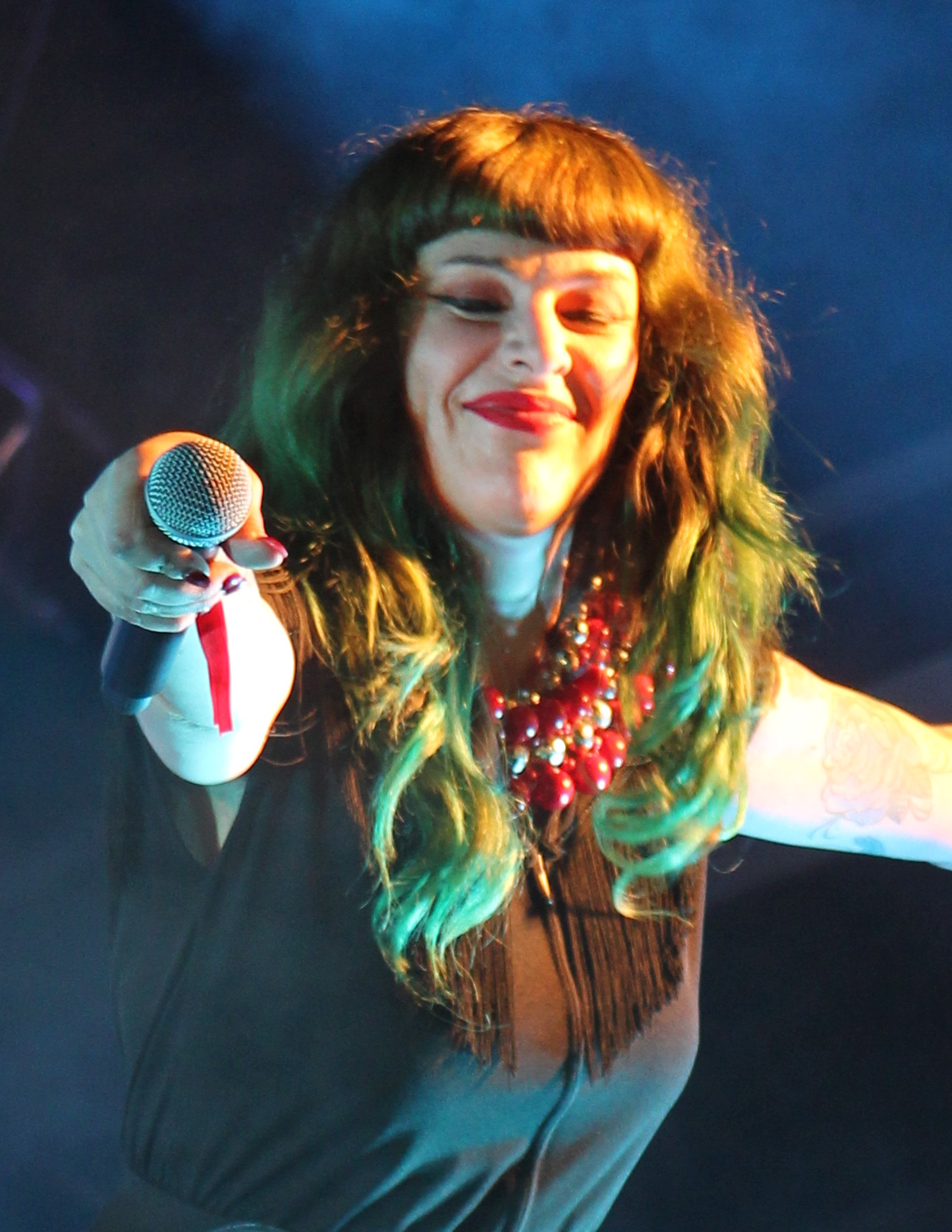
Sónia Tavares

Nininho Vaz Maia

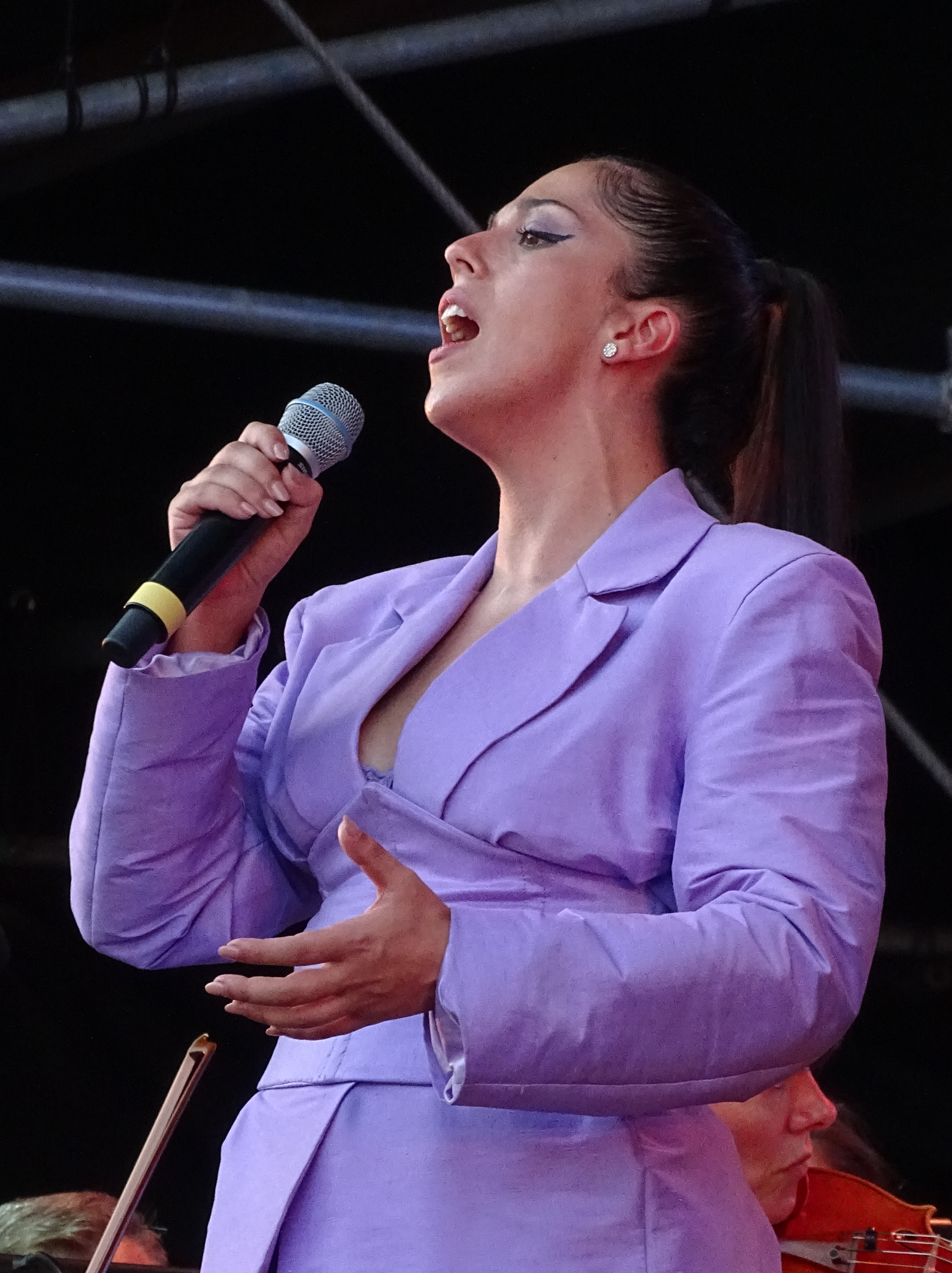
Sara Correia

=== Teams ===
Colour key

- Winner
- Runner-up
- Third place
- Fourth place
- Fifth place
- Eliminated in the Live shows
- Stolen in the Knockouts
- Eliminated in the Knockouts
- Eliminated in the Battles

Coaching teams
Coaches	Top 68 Artists				
Fernando Daniel					
Fernando Daniel	Rafael Ribeiro	Mafalda Ramos	Mariana Cunha	Diogo Videira	~~Neemias Silva~~
Fernando Daniel	André Louro	Francisca Coutinho	João Pedro Teixera	José Francisco	Carolina Ceia
Fernando Daniel	Diogo Fonseca	Joana & Carmo	Joana Costa	João Roças	Miguel Bernardino
Fernando Daniel	Pedro Cau	Rodrigo Marinho	Tânia Horta		
Sónia Tavares					
Sónia Tavares	Bruno Pereira	Beatriz Silva	Marisa Oliveira	Filipe Pires	~~Joana Horta~~
Sónia Tavares	Carolina Soares	João Pedro Oliveira	Pedro Silva	Rúben Fagundes	André Pereira
Sónia Tavares	Cristina Vieira	Fátima Neto	João Sousa	Joshua Santos	Marcelo de Moraes
Sónia Tavares	Pedro Gomes	Pedro Moreira	Rodrigo Seabra		
Nininho Vaz Maia					
Nininho Vaz Maia	Ricardo Maia	Rita Nunes	Catarina Faria	Neemias Silva	~~Beatriz Silva~~
Nininho Vaz Maia	Bruno Correia	Joana Sequeira	Luiza Stulli	Sofia Machado	Ana Maria Costa
Nininho Vaz Maia	Daniyyel de Jesus	Filipa Bidarra	Helena Mendes	Marta Lopes	Paulo Laranjeiro
Nininho Vaz Maia	Petra Gomes	Raquel Franco	Tiago Figueiredo		
Sara Correia					
Sara Correia	Maria João Duque	Gonçalo Lopes	Joana Horta	Hélia Bunga	~~Mafalda Ramos~~
Sara Correia	Joel Barbosa	Ana Alves	Carla Morato	Sofia Forte	Ângelo Barbosa
Sara Correia	Bernardo Dinis	Catarina Vaz	David Garcez	Diogo Fernandes	Gonçalo Enes
Sara Correia	Guilherme Pinheiro	Mafalda Fernandes	Rita Duarte		
Note: Italicized names are artists stolen from another team during the knockouts (names struck through within former teams). Bold names are recipients of the 'super pass'.

== Blind auditions ==
As in the previous season, in the blind auditions (provas cegas in Portuguese), each coach is given two "blocks" to use and prevent another coach from pitching for the artist. The "super block" buttons could be used at any time until the artist is asked which team they want to join. In addition to the blocks, each coach received a "super pass" to give to one artist. The super pass, which was introduced in the fifth season of The Voice Kids, defaults the recipient to that coach's team, blocking all other coaches that turned. Furthermore, each recipient bypasses the battles, going straight to the knockouts.

Blind auditions colour key
✔	Coach pressed the "EU QUERO" button
	Artist joined this coach's team
	Artist was eliminated with no coach pressing their button
	Artist received a 'super pass' and was defaulted to this coach's team
✘	Coach lost the chance to pitch for this artist after another coach's 'super pass'
✘	Coach pressed the "EU QUERO" button, but was:
	Blocked by Fernando; Blocked by Sónia; Blocked by Nininho; Blocked by Sara

=== Episode 1 (22 September 2024) ===
At the beginning of the episode, former coach Diogo Piçarra surprised the coaches singing "Arcade", receiving a four-chair-turn.

First episode's results
Order	Artist	Age	Song	Coach's and artist's choices			
Order	Artist	Age	Song	Fernando	Sónia	Nininho	Sara
1	Rafael Ribeiro	18	"Summertime Sadness"	✔	✔	✔	✔
2	Catarina Nascimento	21	"O Tempo Não Pára"	—	—	—	—
3	Mafalda Ramos	16	"High and Dry"	✘	—	✔	✔
4	João Sousa	27	"R U Mine?"	✔	✔	✔	✔
5	Joana Sequeira	25	"Foste Embora"	—	—	✔	✔
6	Mónica Fernandes	18	"All I Ask"	—	—	—	—
7	Ângelo Barbosa	20	"Tens Os Olhos De Deus"	✔	✔	✔	✔
8	Marcelo de Moraes	49	"Amor I Love You"	—	✔	—	—
9	Carolina Ceia	29	"Time to Say Goodbye"	✔	—	✔	✔
10	Ana Filipa Cunga	25	"Feeling Good"	—	—	—	—
11	Bruno Correia	20	"Como Antes"	✔	✔	✔	✔
12	Mariana Cunha	18	"I Surrender"	✔	✘	✘	✘

=== Episode 2 (29 September) ===
Second episode's results
Order	Artist	Age	Song	Coach's and artist's choices			
Order	Artist	Age	Song	Fernando	Sónia	Nininho	Sara
1	Benedita Calisto	18	"Cavalgada"	—	—	—	—
2	João Pedro Teixera	28	"Somebody To Love"	✔	—	✔	✔
3	Joana Horta	30	"Alone"	—	✔	—	✔
4	Mário Gomes	29	"Esta Balada Que Te Dou"	—	—	—	—
5	Rita Nunes	33	"I Kissed A Girl"	✘	✔	✔	✔
6	André Louro	26	"Loucos de Lisboa"	✔	—	—	—
7	Tânia Horta	17	"Back to Black"	✔	✔	—	—
8	André Lopes	21	"É o que É"	—	—	—	—
9	Fátima Neto	44	"La Llorona"	—	✔	—	—
10	Joel Barbosa	18	"The Greatest"	—	✔	—	✔
11	Sofia Igreja	15	"Vampire"	—	—	—	—
12	Tiago Figueiredo	17	"Nada Errado"	—	—	✔	—
13	Augusto Diogo	41	"Canção sem final"	—	—	—	—
14	Hélia Bunga	25	"Listen"	✘	✘	✘	✔

=== Episode 3 (6 October) ===
Third episode's results
Order	Artist	Age	Song	Coach's and artist's choices			
Order	Artist	Age	Song	Fernando	Sónia	Nininho	Sara
1	Carla Morato	36	"Antes Que Digas Adeus"	✔	✔	✔	✔
2	Ana Leonor Ramos	17	"Skyfall"	—	—	—	—
3	David Garcez	26	"Tata"	✔	—	—	✔
4	Raquel Franco	21	"Bohemian Rhapsody"	—	—	✔	—
5	José Francisco	20	"Casa"	✔	✔	—	✔
6	Sandra Coelho	47	"Não Queiras Saber de Mim"	—	—	—	—
7	Paulo Laranjeiro	59	"Dá-me Um Abraço"	—	—	✔	—
8	Catarina Martins	16	"Papel Principal"	—	—	—	—
9	Gonçalo Enes	22	"The Blower's Daughter"	✘	—	—	✔
10	João Gomes	22	"Guarda-me Esta Noite"	—	—	—	—
11	Sofia Machado	25	"Rise Up"	—	—	✔	—
12	Maks Rayvan	32	"River"	—	—	—	—
13	Filipe Pires	18	"Michelle"	✘	✔	✘	✘

=== Episode 4 (13 October) ===
Fourth episode's results
Order	Artist	Age	Song	Coach's and artist's choices			
Order	Artist	Age	Song	Fernando	Sónia	Nininho	Sara
1	Alessandra Samuel	16	"Os Búzios"	—	—	—	—
2	Francisca Coutinho	19	"Oceans (Where Feet May Fail)"	✔	✔	—	✔
3	Pedro Gomes	28	"Lua"	—	✔	—	—
4	João Roças	26	"Better Man"	✔	—	—	—
5	Miguel Rodrigues	32	"Mano a Mano"	—	—	—	—
6	Joana & Carmo	21	"Maria Do Mar"	✔	—	—	—
7	Daniyyel de Jesus	26	"First Time"	—	—	✔	—
8	Guilherme Santos	31	"Mundo"	—	—	—	—
9	Luiza Stulli	30	"Ain't Nobody"	—	—	✔	✔
10	Miguel Candeias	26	"Benvinda seijas Maria"	—	—	—	—
11	Marisa Oliveira	21	"You Say"	—	✔	✔	—
12	Jaqueline Carvaho	40	"Veio a Saudade"	—	—	—	—
13	André Pereira	20	"idontwannabeyouanymore"	—	✔	—	✔
14	Ricardo Maia	17	"Eterno"	✔	✔	✔	✔

=== Episode 5 (20 October) ===
Fifth episode's results
Order	Artist	Age	Song	Coach's and artist's choices			
Order	Artist	Age	Song	Fernando	Sónia	Nininho	Sara
1	Pedro Silva	29	"Wicked Game"	✔	✔	✔	✔
2	Filipa Bidarra	21	"She Used to Be Mine"	—	—	✔	—
3	Isabella Robinson	17	"Eu Sei"	—	—	—	—
4	Pedro Moreira	22	"All for You"	✔	✔	—	—
5	Carolina Soares	17	"Love in the Dark"	—	✔	—	—
6	Bento Carneiro	21	"When I Look at You"	—	—	—	—
7	Ana Maria Costa	21	"Counting My Blessings"	✔	—	✔	—
8	Miguel Rondão	27	"Um Dia Hei De Voltar"	—	—	—	—
9	Mafalda Fernandes	19	"Writing's on the Wall"	✔	—	✔	✔
10	Ana Alves	22	"Can't Catch Me Now"	—	—	—	✔
11	João Castro	45	"Dance Me to the End of Love"	—	—	—	—
12	Rita Duarte	26	"Les Chemins de l'amour""	—	—	✔	✔
13	Pedro Cau	25	"Versace on the Floor"	✔	—	—	—
14	Joana Costa	30	"My Immortal"	✔	✔	✔	✔

=== Episode 6 (27 October) ===
At the beginning of the episode, The Voice Kids season 5 coach Cuca Roseta surprised the coaches singing "Dis, Quand Reviendras-tu", receiving a four-chair-turn.

Sixth episode's results
Order	Artist	Age	Song	Coach's and artist's choices			
Order	Artist	Age	Song	Fernando	Sónia	Nininho	Sara
1	Mafalda Pinheiro	15	"Toxic"	—	—	—	—
2	Guilherme Pinheiro	24	"Fever"	—	—	—	✔
3	Carolina Leira	25	"Honey"	—	—	—	—
4	Rúben Fagundes	20	"Nessun dorma"	✔	✔	—	—
5	Marta Lopes	28	"Alright, Okay, You Win"	✔	—	✔	✔
6	Steffi Lima	28	"Jura"	—	—	—	—
7	Cristina Vieira	27	"Sweet Dreams (Are Made of This)"	✔	✔	✔	✔
8	Diogo Fonseca	22	"For the First Time"	✔	—	—	✔
9	Gonçalo Silva	22	"A House Is Not a Home"	—	—	—	—
10	Helena Mendes	23	"The House of the Rising Sun"	—	—	✔	✘
11	Lia Antunes	22	"Don't Stop Believin'"	—	—	—	—
12	Catarina Vaz	28	"Barco Negro"	—	—	—	✔
13	Gonçalo Lopes	29	"What Was I Made For?"	✘	✘	✘	✔

=== Episode 7 (3 November) ===
Seventh episode's results
Order	Artist	Age	Song	Coach's and artist's choices			
Order	Artist	Age	Song	Fernando	Sónia	Nininho	Sara
1	Luís Manhita	47	"Gaivota"	—	—	—	—
2	Catarina Faria	17	"Love on the Brain"	✘	✘	✔	✘
3	Bruno Pereira	24	"Someone You Loved"	—	✔	—	—
4	Nicolas Duarte	27	"Wicked Game"	—	—	—	—
5	Maria João Duque	21	"What's Up?"	✔	—	—	✔
6	Miguel Bernardino	18	"Cavalos de Corrida"	✔	—	—	—
7	Márcio Furtado	29	"Pray"	—	—	—	—
8	João Pedro Oliveira	19	"Falling Like the Stars"	✔	✔	—	✔
9	Laura Gonçalves	38	"Quelqu'un m'a dit"	—	—	—	—
10	Rodrigo Marinho	26	"Let Me Entertain You"	✔	—	—	✔
11	Bernardo Dinis	21	"What About Us"	—	—	—	✔
12	Tiago Ferraz	29	"Golden Hour"	—	—	—	—
13	Beatriz Silva	19	"One Night Only"	✔	✔	✔	✔

=== Episode 8 (10 November) ===
Eighth episode's results
Order	Artist	Age	Song	Coach's and artist's choices			
Order	Artist	Age	Song	Fernando	Sónia	Nininho	Sara
1	José Mendes	33	"Rosinha Dos Limões"	—	—	—	—
2	Neemias Silva	30	"Bless the Broken Road"	✔	✔	✘	✔
3	Petra Gomes	32	"Mon Amour"	✔	—	✔	—
4	Alan Rey	25	"Beauty and a Beat"	—	—	Team full	—
5	Diogo Fernandes	31	"Força"	—	✔	Team full	✔
6	Carolina Amorim	20	"Ceilings"	—	—	Team full	—
7	Diogo Videira	21	"Tennessee Whiskey"	✔	✔	Team full	✔
8	Joshua Santos	27	"All I Want"	Team full	✔	Team full	—
9	Joana Gomes	18	"Leaving My Love Behind"	Team full	—	Team full	—
10	Sofia Forte	27	"Dancing Queen"	Team full	✔	Team full	✔
11	Margarida Ezequiel	23	"Silêncio e Tanta Gente"	Team full	—	Team full	Team full
12	Rodrigo Seabra	15	"Come Fly with Me"	Team full	✔	Team full	Team full

== Battles ==
The battles (called batalhas in Portuguese) began on 17 November. In this round, each coach divides their artists into duos, trios, or quartets to perform a song. The coach then can pick one winner, multiple winners, or no winners from the battle. The four "super pass" artists from the blind auditions are exempt from this round. At the end of the round, each coach takes eight artists into the knockouts.

Battles colour key
Artist won the battle and advanced to the knockouts
Artist lost the battle and was eliminated

=== Episode 9 (17 November) ===
Ninth episode's results
Coach	Order	Winners	Song	Loser
Fernando	1	José Francisco	"The Scientist"	Diogo Fonseca
Fernando	1	Rafael Ribeiro	"The Scientist"	Diogo Fonseca
Fernando	2	André Louro	"Foi Assim Que Aconteceu"	Joana & Carmo
Fernando	2	André Louro	"Foi Assim Que Aconteceu"	Tânia Horta
Fernando	3	Francisca Coutinho	"You Say"	N/A
Fernando	3	Neemias Silva	"You Say"	N/A
Sara	4	Hélia Bunga	"Respect"	Mafalda Fernandes
Sara	4	Maria João Duque	"Respect"	Rita Duarte
Sara	5	Carla Morato	"Rosa Da Madragoa"	Ângelo Barbosa
Sara	6	Ana Alves	"Lovely"	Gonçalo Enes
Sara	6	Joel Barbosa	"Lovely"	Gonçalo Enes
Nininho	7	Luiza Stulli	"I Wanna Dance with Somebody"	Helena Mendes
Nininho	7	Rita Nunes	"I Wanna Dance with Somebody"	Helena Mendes
Nininho	8	Bruno Correia	"Meu Fado Meu"	N/A
Nininho	8	Joana Sequeira	"Meu Fado Meu"	N/A
Nininho	9	N/A	"Carro"	Ana Maria Costa
Nininho	9	N/A	"Carro"	Raquel Franco
Nininho	9	N/A	"Carro"	Tiago Figueiredo
Sónia	10	Bruno Pereira	"If the World Was Ending"	André Pereira
Sónia	10	João Pedro Oliveira	"If the World Was Ending"	Joshua Santos
Sónia	11	Rúben Fagundes	"My Way"	Rodrigo Seabra

=== Episode 10 (24 November) ===
Tenth episode's results
Coach	Order	Winners	Song	Loser
Fernando	1	João Pedro Teixera	"Beauty and the Beast"	Carolina Ceia
Fernando	2	N/A	"O Pastor"	Joana Costa
Fernando	2	N/A	"O Pastor"	Miguel Bernardino
Fernando	2	N/A	"O Pastor"	Rodrigo Marinho
Fernando	3	Diogo Videira	"In the Stars"	João Roças
Fernando	3	Diogo Videira	"In the Stars"	Pedro Cau
Sara	4	Mafalda Ramos	"Rolling in the Deep"	Bernardo Dinis
Sara	4	Sofia Forte	"Rolling in the Deep"	Guilherme Pinheiro
Sara	5	N/A	"Monarquia"	Catarina Vaz
Sara	5	N/A	"Monarquia"	David Garcez
Sara	5	N/A	"Monarquia"	Diogo Fernandes
Sónia	6	Pedro Silva	"Chaga"	João Sousa
Sónia	7	N/A	"Lua"	Fátima Neto
Sónia	7	N/A	"Lua"	Marcelo de Moraes
Sónia	7	N/A	"Lua"	Pedro Gomes
Sónia	7	N/A	"Lua"	Pedro Moreira
Sónia	8	Carolina Soares	"Die with a Smile"	Cristina Vieira
Sónia	8	Joana Horta	"Die with a Smile"	Cristina Vieira
Sónia	8	Marisa Oliveira	"Die with a Smile"	Cristina Vieira
Nininho	9	N/A	"Imagine"	Daniyyel de Jesus
Nininho	9	N/A	"Imagine"	Marta Lopes
Nininho	9	N/A	"Imagine"	Paulo Laranjeiro
Nininho	10	Ricardo Maia	"Por Mim"	Petra Gomes
Nininho	11	Beatriz Silva	"When You Believe"	Filipa Bidarra
Nininho	11	Sofia Machado	"When You Believe"	Filipa Bidarra

== Knockouts ==
The knockouts (called tira-teimas in Portuguese) began on 1 December. Four artists from each team performed on the first night, and the other four performed on the second night. A coach can steal an artist, but can steal another artist, knocking the originally stolen artist out of the competition. At the end of the round, each coach takes a total of four artists to the live shows; three of their own artists and one stolen artist.

Knockouts colour key
Artist was selected by their coach to advance to the live shows
Artist was stolen by another coach and advanced to the live shows
Artist was originally stolen by another coach, but was later switched with another artist
Artist lost and was eliminated

=== Episode 11 (1 December) ===
Eleventh episode's results
Order	Coach	Artist	Song	Result
1	Nininho	Bruno Correia	"Melodia da Saudade"	Stolen by Fernando
2	Nininho	Luiza Stulli	"Tough Lover"	Eliminated
3	Nininho	Catarina Faria	"Melhor de Mim"	Advanced
4	Nininho	Sofia Machado	"Right to Be Wrong"	Eliminated
5	Sónia	Rúben Fagundes	"Wind of Change"	Eliminated
6	Sónia	Marisa Oliveira	"Hurt"	Advanced
7	Sónia	Filipe Pires	"No Teu Poema"	Advanced
8	Sónia	Pedro Silva	"Supremacy"	Stolen by Sara
9	Fernando	Mariana Cunha	"Because of You"	Advanced
10	Fernando	Diogo Videira	"Lose Control"	Advanced
11	Fernando	José Francisco	"O Meu Verão Não Acabou"	Eliminated
12	Fernando	Neemias Silva	"You're Still the One"	Stolen by Nininho
13	Sara	Gonçalo Lopes	"Too Good at Goodbyes"	Advanced
14	Sara	Carla Morato	"Loucura"	Eliminated
15	Sara	Sofia Forte	"Who Knew"	Eliminated
16	Sara	Hélia Bunga	"No One"	Advanced

=== Episode 12 (8 December) ===
Twelfth episode's results
Order	Coach	Artist	Song	Result
1	Sónia	Joana Horta	"Eu Sei"	Stolen by Sara
2	Sónia	Bruno Pereira	"When I Was Your Man"	Advanced
3	Sónia	Carolina Soares	"Mar Salgado"	Eliminated
4	Sónia	João Pedro Oliveira	"Don't Stop Believin'"	Eliminated
5	Nininho	Ricardo Maia	"Chamar A Música"	Advanced
6	Nininho	Rita Nunes	"Beautiful Things"	Advanced
7	Nininho	Joana Sequeira	"Cancão Do Mar"	Eliminated
8	Nininho	Beatriz Silva	"I Have Nothing"	Stolen by Sónia
9	Sara	Mafalda Ramos	"Feeling Good"	Stolen by Fernando
10	Sara	Joel Barbosa	"She Used to Be Mine"	Eliminated
11	Sara	Ana Rita Alves	"Saída De Emergência"	Eliminated
12	Sara	Maria João Duque	"Proud Mary"	Advanced
13	Fernando	André Louro	"Caçador De Sóis"	Eliminated
14	Fernando	Rafael Ribeiro	"Everything I Wanted"	Advanced
15	Fernando	Francisca Coutinho	"Lusitana Paixão"	Eliminated
16	Fernando	João Pedro Teixeira	"Whataya Want from Me"	Eliminated

== Live shows ==
Live shows (Galas em direto) colour key
Artist saved by the public's vote
Artist received a "Wild card"
Artist was eliminated

=== Episode 13 (15 December) ===
The Live shows began airing on 15 December. In episodes 13 and 14, one artist per team was eliminated by the public vote.

Thirteenth episode's results
Order	Coach	Artist	Song	Result
1	Nininho	Catarina Faria	"Chandelier"	Advanced
2	Sónia	Bruno Pereira	"Que O Amor Te Salve Nesta Noite Escura"	Advanced
3	Fernando	Mariana Cunha	"All by Myself"	Advanced
4	Sara	Maria João Duque	"Disco Inferno"	Advanced
5	Nininho	Ricardo Maia	"Eu Estou Aqui"	Advanced
6	Sónia	Marisa Oliveira	"O Sopro Do Coração"	Advanced
7	Nininho	Rita Nunes	"Say Something"	Advanced
8	Fernando	Mafalda Ramos	"Passeio dos prodígios"	Advanced
9	Nininho	Neemias Silva	"Tudo Que Você Quisier"	Eliminated
10	Sara	Joana Horta	"Grito"	Advanced
11	Sónia	Filipe Pires	"I'll Never Love Again"	Eliminated
12	Fernando	Diogo Videira	"Let It Go"	Eliminated
13	Sónia	Beatriz Silva	"Telepatia"	Advanced
14	Sara	Gonçalo Lopes	"Who Wants To Live Forever"	Advanced
15	Fernando	Rafael Ribeiro	"Cancão De Engate"	Advanced
16	Sara	Hélia Bunga	"Única Mulher"	Eliminated

=== Episode 14 (22 December) ===
Fourteenth episode's results
Order	Coach	Artist	Song	Result
1	Sara	Maria João Duque	"Flor Sem Tempo"	Advanced
2	Fernando	Mariana Cunha	"Eu Não Sei Quem Te Perdeu"	Eliminated
3	Sónia	Beatriz Silva	"Halo"	Advanced
4	Nininho	Ricardo Maia	"A Puro Dolor"	Advanced
5	Sara	Joana Horta	"Circo De Feras"	Eliminated
6	Fernando	Rafael Ribeiro	"Primavera"	Advanced
7	Sónia	Marisa Oliveira	"Lady Marmalade"	Eliminated
8	Sara	Gonçalo Lopes	"Lagos"	Advanced
9	Nininho	Catarina Faria	"I See Red"	Eliminated
10	Fernando	Mafalda Ramos	"Drivers License"	Advanced
11	Nininho	Rita Nunes	"I Will Always Love You"	Advanced
12	Sónia	Bruno Pereira	"Foram Cardos, Foram Prosas"	Advanced

=== Episode 15: Semi-final (29 December) ===
The semi-final aired on 29 December. The Top 8 performed a solo performance and a trio performance with their coach and the other artist on their team. The artist with the most votes on each team automatically advanced to the final. At the end of the show, the four artists in the bottom (the artist the received the fewest votes on each team) could be saved by the public as a "wild card."

With the advancements of Ricardo Maia and Rita Nunes, Nininho Vaz Maia became the second coach in the history of the show, after António Zambujo in the seventh season, to bring two artists to the final on their first season.

Fifteenth episode's results
Order	Coach	Artist	Song	Result
1	Fernando	Rafael Ribeiro	"Another Love"	Advanced
2	Sónia	Beatriz Silva	"Talvez"	Eliminated
3	Nininho	Rita Nunes	"Somewhere Over The Rainbow"	Wild card
4	Sara	Gonçalo Lopes	"Somewhere Only We Know"	Eliminated
5	Fernando	Mafalda Ramos	"People Help the People"	Eliminated
6	Nininho	Ricardo Maia	"Perdóname"	Advanced
7	Sónia	Bruno Pereira	"High and Dry"	Advanced
8	Sara	Maria João Duque	"I Put a Spell on You"	Advanced

=== Episode 16: Final (5 January) ===
The final aired on 5 January 2025. At the start of the round, the finalists performed "A Nossa Vez" to kick off the final. After the group performance, each of the five finalists performed a solo song and a duet with a special guest. From there, the three artists with the most votes moved on to the second stage where they sang their blind audition song once more for final votes. The winner was announced following this stage.

At the end of the second stage, Rafael Ribeiro from Team Fernando won the competition, marking Fernando Daniel's first win as a coach on the main version of the show.

Sixteenth episode's results
Round	Coach	Artist	Order	Solo song	Order	Duet with guest	Result
Round one	Nininho Vaz Maia	Rita Nunes	1	"This Is Me"	7	"It's a Man's Man's Man's World" (with Matay)	Top 3
Round one	Fernando Daniel	Rafael Ribeiro	6	"Cantor de Sonhos"	2	"Mentira" (with João Pedro Pais)	Top 3
Round one	Sara Correia	Maria João Duque	3	"Something's Got a Hold on Me"	8	"Nada Mais" (with Marisa Liz)	Fourth place
Round one	Sónia Tavares	Bruno Pereira	9	"Just Us"	4	"Homem do Leme" (with Tim dos Xutos)	Fifth place
Round one	Nininho Vaz Maia	Ricardo Maia	5	"Gaivota"	10	"Roubei-te um beijo" (with Buba Espinho)	Top 3
Round two	Nininho Vaz Maia	Ricardo Maia	1	"Eterno"			Runner-up
Round two	Fernando Daniel	Rafael Ribeiro	2	"Summertime Sadness"			Winner
Round two	Nininho Vaz Maia	Rita Nunes	3	"I Kissed a Girl"			Third place

== Elimination chart ==
Teams colour key

- Team Fernando
- Team Sónia
- Team Nininho
- Team Sara

Results colour key

- Winner
- Runner-up
- Third place
- Fourth place
- Fifth place
- Saved by the "Wild card"
- Saved by public vote
- Eliminated

Results per week
Artist	Week 1	Week 2	Week 3	Week 4
Rafael Ribeiro	Safe	Safe	Safe	Winner
Ricardo Maia	Safe	Safe	Safe	Runner-up
Rita Nunes	Safe	Safe	Safe	Third place
Maria João Duque	Safe	Safe	Safe	Fourth place
Bruno Pereira	Safe	Safe	Safe	Fifth place
Beatriz Silva	Safe	Safe	Eliminated	
Gonçalo Lopes	Safe	Safe	Eliminated	
Mafalda Ramos	Safe	Safe	Eliminated	
Catarina Faria	Safe	Eliminated		
Joana Horta	Safe	Eliminated		
Mariana Cunha	Safe	Eliminated		
Marisa Oliveira	Safe	Eliminated		
Diogo Videira	Eliminated			
Filipe Pires	Eliminated			
Hélia Bunga	Eliminated			
Neemias Silva	Eliminated			
