= The Voice Portugal season 14 =

The Voice Portugal
- Season 14
- Promotional poster featuring coaches Daniel, Pascoal, Tavares, and David & Mickael Carreira
- Hosted by: Catarina Furtado; Maria Petronilho (backstage)
- Coaches: David & Mickael Carreira; Sónia Tavares; Fernando Daniel; Cláudia Pascoal; Luís Trigacheiro (Second Chance)

Release
- Original network: RTP1
- Original release: 11 October 2026 – present

Season chronology
- ← Previous; Season 13

The fourteenth season of The Voice Portugal is a talent show broadcast on RTP1, which premiered on 11 October 2026. Fernando Daniel and Sónia Tavares both returned as coaches from the previous season. Former coach Mickael Carreira formed a coaching duo with his brother, David Carreira, this season, replacing Calema. Additionally, season 5 contestant Cláudia Pascoal debuted as a coach this season, replacing Sara Correia. Catarina Furtado returned as the main hostess and Maria Petronilho returned as the backstage hostess.

This season introduced a fifth coach who mentors artists selected for a "Second Chance" stage. Season eight winner Luís Trigacheiro was featured as the coach in this role.

== Coaches ==
Coaches of The Voice Portugal season 14

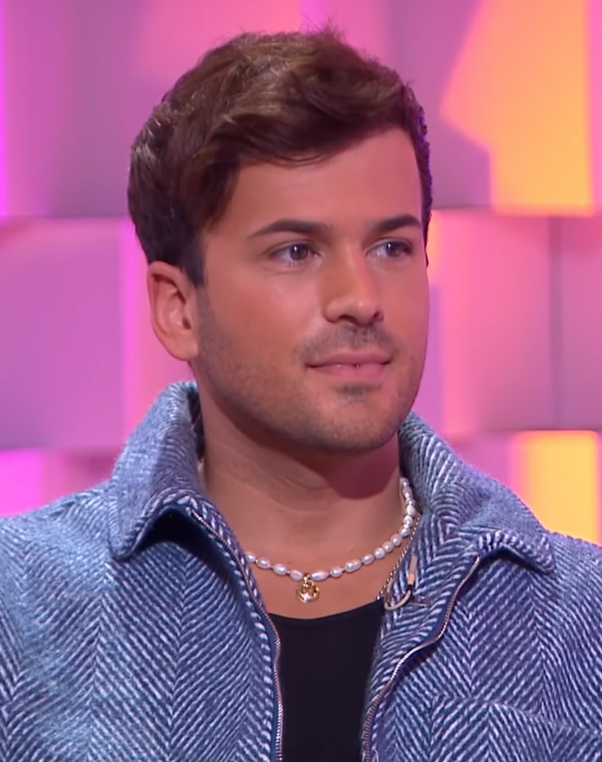
David Carreira (duo)

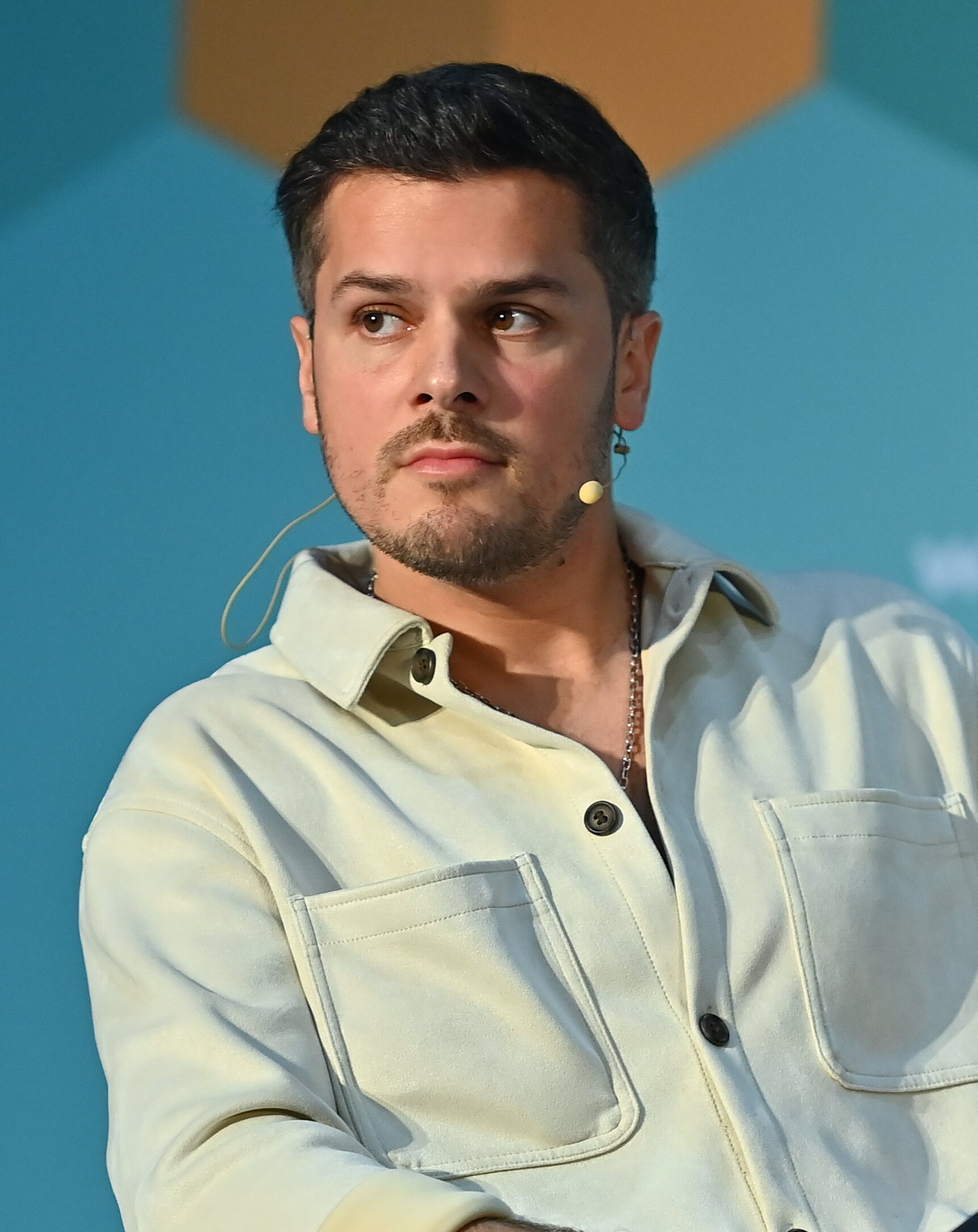
Mickael Carreira (duo)

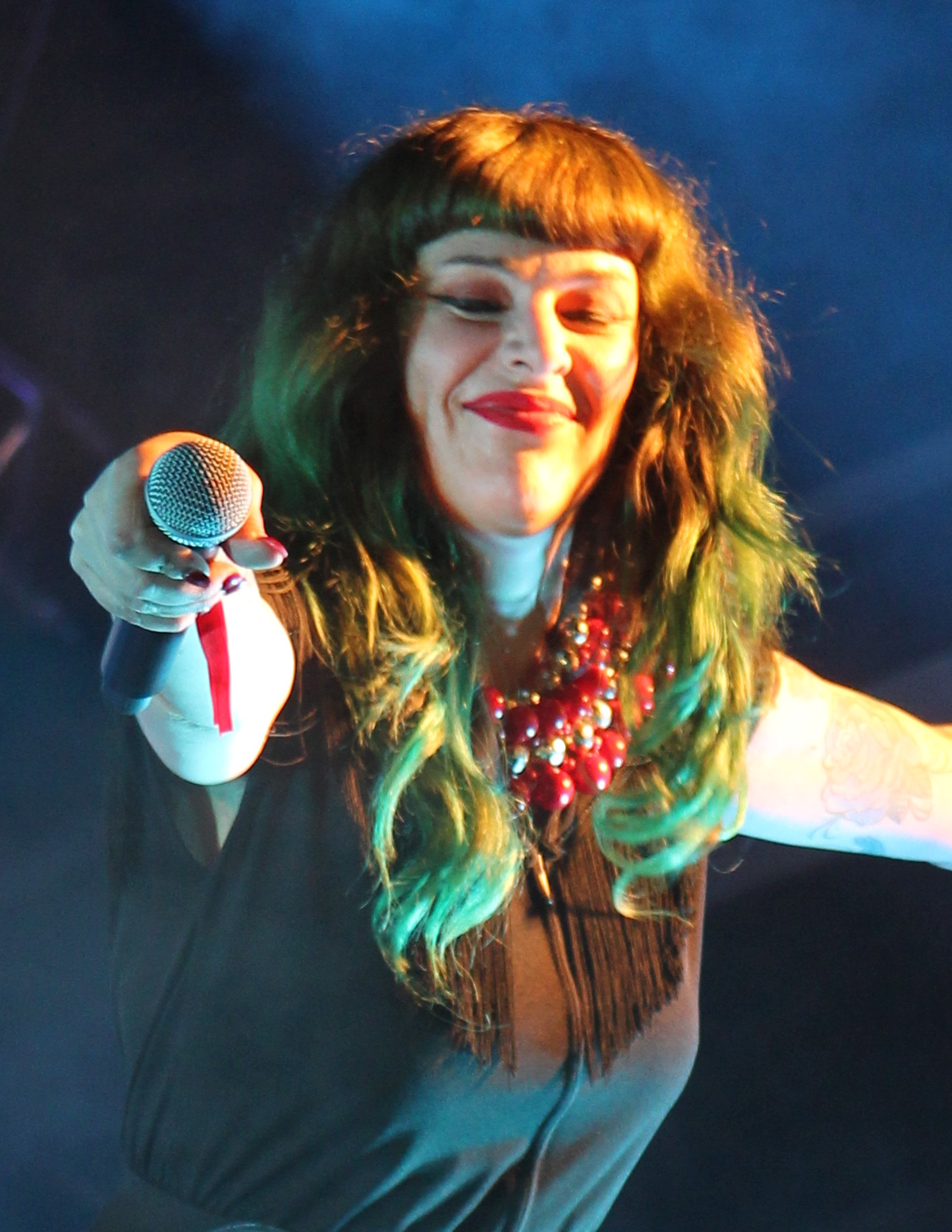
Sónia Tavares

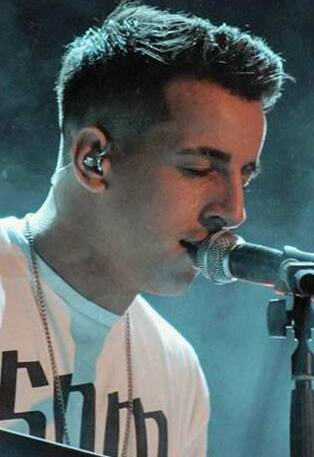
Fernando Daniel

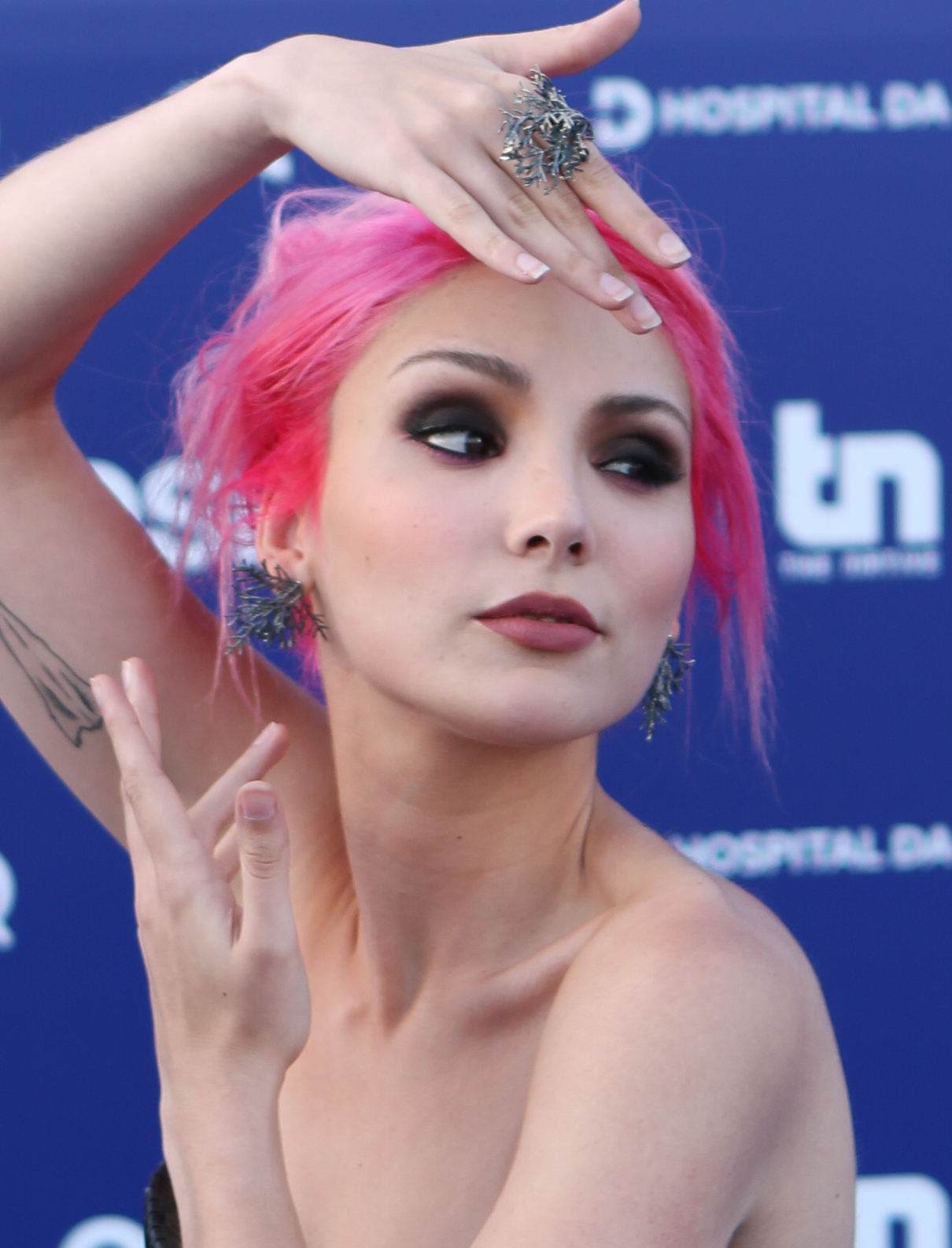
Cláudia Pascoal

Luís Trigacheiro (Second Chance)

=== Teams ===
Colour key

- Winner
- Runner-up
- Third place
- Fourth place
- Fifth place
- Eliminated in the Live shows
- Stolen in the Knockouts
- Eliminated in the Knockouts
- Eliminated in the Battles
- Joined another team
- Eliminated after Second Chance

Coaching teams
Coaches	Top 64 Artists				
David & Mickael Carreira					
David & Mickael Carreira	Patrícia Fier	Eva Borges	Afonso Ornelas	Roberto Roque	Elodie Rodrigues
David & Mickael Carreira	Rúdi Sousa	Catarina Silvério	Catarina Lima	Sara Pereira	Leonel Varela
David & Mickael Carreira	Leonor Martins	Madalena Fernandes			
Sónia Tavares					
Sónia Tavares	João Reiz	Daniela Simões	Ádrian del Rio	Beatrice Constantin	Bárbara Ferraz
Sónia Tavares	Amélia Pinto	Pedro Correia	Margarida Madureira	Tiago Fumiko	Leonor Gomes
Sónia Tavares	Constantino Sousa	Juliana Casado	Fabiana Ferreira		
Fernando Daniel					
Fernando Daniel	Jake Miagra	Lucía Vicente	Esmeralda Fernandez	Jeosafá Soares	Jéssica Freiria
Fernando Daniel	Mariana Simões	Maria Eduarda	Delfim Santos	Matilde Cepeda	Carolina Brandão
Fernando Daniel	Victoria Montiel	Carlos Vilas Boas	Isamara Alves		
Cláudia Pascoal					
Cláudia Pascoal	Duarte Figueiredo	Ashley Fortes	Mariana Guerra	Tiago Paralta	João Robalinho
Cláudia Pascoal	Tiago Leite	Chloe Silva	Gustavo Daniel	Maria Paulo	Catarina Correia
Cláudia Pascoal	Rita Luz	Margarida Prieto	Rita Serra		
Luís Trigacheiro					
Luís Trigacheiro	Diana Mendes	Rafael Matos	Bruna Leonor	Lara Rocha	Diogo Barbosa
Note: Italicized names are artists stolen from another team during the knockouts (names struck through within former teams). Bold names are recipients of the 'Segunda Oportunidade' button.

== Blind auditions ==
Like the previous season, in the blind auditions (provas cegas in Portuguese), each coach is given two "blocks" to use and prevent another coach from pitching for the artist. The "super block" buttons could be used at any time until the artist is asked which team they want to join.

New this season is the "boomerang" feature. This allows each coach to reverse a block back to the coach who originally blocked them. It can be used by each coach one time in the span of the blind auditions.

For the first time in the show's history, eliminated artists had the chance to be saved by the fifth coach, Luís Trigacheiro, adapted from the fifteenth season of The Voice Australia. He then mentored them on Team Luís. After each coach had sixteen artists on their team, the saved artists were sent back into the blind auditions for a second chance.

Blind auditions colour key
✔	Coach pressed the "EU QUERO" button
	Artist defaulted to this coach's team
	Artist selected to join this coach's team
	Artist was eliminated, but got a second chance to be mentored by Luís Trigacheiro
	Artist was eliminated with no coach pressing their button
✘	Coach used a boomerang block, reversing the block back to the coach who initiated it
✘	Coach pressed the "EU QUERO" button, but was:
	Blocked by David & Mickael; Blocked by Sónia; Blocked by Fernando; Blocked by Cláudia

=== Episode 1 (11 October 2026) ===
First episode's results
Order	Artist	Age	Hometown	Song	Coach's and artist's choices			
Order	Artist	Age	Hometown	Song	David & Mickael	Sónia	Fernando	Cláudia
1	João Reiz^{1}		Vitória	"Purple Rain"	✔	✔	✔	✔
2	Patrícia Fier		Braga	"A Voz"	✔	✔	✔	✔
3	Jake Miagra		Porto	"A.M.O.R."	✔	✘	✔	✔
4	Constança Carmesim	19		"Adeus Amor Adeus"	—	—	—	—
5	Daniela Simões			"Je suis malade"	✔	✔	✔	✔
6	Duarte Figueiredo			"Frágil"	—	—	—	✔
7	Lucía Vicente		Almada	"Who's Lovin' You"	✔	✔	✔	✔
8	Carlos Fructuosa			"Linda Noiva Tem Portel"	—	—	—	—
9	Eva Borges	18		"Summertime"	✔	—	—	✔
10	Francisco Catanho		Madeira	"Por Una Cabeza"	—	—	—	—
11	Ashley Fortes	35	Paris	"Voilà"	✘	✔	✔	✔
12	Diana Mendes			"Tempo"	—	—	—	—

- ^1 After his audition, producers made Reiz audition again later in the episode after originally performing and receiving a four-chair-turn; thus, he did not pick his coach after the first performance. When he auditioned again, his family surprised him in the chairs and he picked his coach after that.

=== Episode 2 (18 October) ===
Second episode's results
Order	Artist	Age	Hometown	Song	Coach's and artist's choices			
Order	Artist	Age	Hometown	Song	David & Mickael	Sónia	Fernando	Cláudia
1	Ádrian del Rio	27	Faro	"A Song for You"	✘	✔	—	✔
2	Mariana Guerra	22	Campo Maior	"O Meu Nome é Saudade"	—	—	—	✔
3	Luana Velasquez	20	Lagoa	"Tu Não Me Digas"	—	—	—	—
4	Afonso Ornelas	22	Madeira	"Amar pelos dois"	✔	✔	✔	✔
5	Beatrice Constantin	27	Marinha Grande	"Vida Tão Estranha"	✔	✔	—	✔
6	Rafael Matos	19	Porto	"Dancing on My Own"	—	—	—	—
7	Roberto Roque	25	Cape Verde	"Ponto de Luz"	✔	✔	✘	✔
8	Esmeralda Fernandez	36	Galicia	"La de la Mochila Azul"	—	—	✔	—
9	Luís Trigo	41	Porto	"New York, New York"	—	—	—	—
10	Elodie Rodrigues	23	Bragança	"Hymne à l'amour"	✔	✔	—	—
11	Beatriz Rasteiro	18	Lisbon	"Gosto de Ti"	—	—	—	—
12	Jeosafá Soares	30	Porto	"À Primeira Vista"	—	—	✔	✔
13	Jéssica Freiria	21	Viana do Castelo	"Hurt"	✘	✔	✔	✔

=== Episode 3 (25 October) ===
Third episode's results
Order	Artist	Age	Hometown	Song	Coach's and artist's choices			
Order	Artist	Age	Hometown	Song	David & Mickael	Sónia	Fernando	Cláudia
1	Beatriz Lima	22	Vila Real	"You Raise Me Up"	—	—	—	—
2	Mariana Simões	22	Braga	"Mon amour"	✔	✔	✔	—
3	Rúdi Sousa	35	Marinha Grande	"Por Quem Não Esqueci"	✔	—	—	—
4	Bárbara Ferraz	17	Sintra	"The Visitor"	—	✔	—	✔
5	Leandro Vieira	29	Leiria	"Carta"	—	—	—	—
6	Bruna Leonor	23	Setúbal	"On My Mind"	—	—	—	—
7	Tiago Paralta	24	Ovar	"Drivers License"	✔	✔	—	✔
8	Maria Eduarda	19	Madeira	"How Am I Supposed to Live Without You"	—	—	✔	—
9	Lyubov Panteleitchouk	28	Viseu	"Um Contra o Outro"	—	—	—	—
10	João Robalinho	32	Vila Nova de Gaia	"Sombras Na Madrugada"	—	—	—	✔
11	Catarina Silvério	29	Alpiarça	"Papel Principal"	✔	—	—	—
12	David Moreira	56	Braga	"Can't Help Falling in Love"	—	—	—	—
13	Tiago Leite	25	Madeira / Lisbon	"Como É Bom Esperar Alguém"	✔	✔	✔	✔

=== Episode 4 (1 November) ===
Fourth episode's results
Order	Artist	Age	Hometown	Song	Coach's and artist's choices			
Order	Artist	Age	Hometown	Song	David & Mickael	Sónia	Fernando	Cláudia
1	Catarina Lima	40	Cascais	"La Vie en Rose"	✔	✔	—	✔
2	Chloe Silva	19	Leiria	"Die on This Hill"	—	—	—	✔
3	Miguel Sousa	34	Amadora	"Chaga"	—	—	—	—
4	Amélia Pinto	26	Suica / Faro	"I Believe to My Soul"	✔	✔	—	✔
5	Pedro Henriqes	18	Viseu	"Anyone"	—	—	—	—
6	Gustavo Daniel	23	Faial / Porto	"Inquietação"	—	—	—	✔
7	Nadir da Costa	23	Lisbon	"A Paixão (Segundo Nicolau da Viola)"	—	—	—	—
8	Delfim Santos	26	Porto / Setúbal	"Monarquia"	—	—	✔	—
9	Catarina Silva	24	Vila Nova de Gaia	"(You Make Me Feel Like) A Natural Woman"	—	—	—	—
10	Maria Paulo	16	Pego	"Que O Amor Te Salve Nesta Noite Escura"	✔	—	—	✔
11	Clara Sampaio	28	Vila Real	"In the Stars"	—	—	—	—
12	Pedro Correia	—N/a	Barreiro	"Pink Pony Club"	—	✔	—	—
13	João Limpo	34	Moura	"Igreja de Santo Estevão"	—	—	—	—
14	Matilde Cepeda	22	Mirandela	"O mio babbino caro"	✘	✔	✔	✘

=== Episode 5 (8 November) ===
Fifth episode's results
Order	Artist	Age	Hometown	Song	Coach's and artist's choices			
Order	Artist	Age	Hometown	Song	David & Mickael	Sónia	Fernando	Cláudia
1	Margarida Madureira	27	Marco de Canaveses	"E Depois do Adeus"	—	✔	—	✔
2	Sara Pereira	17	Cabeceiras de Basto	"What's Up"	✔	—	—	—
3	Diogo Rocha	29	Ovar	"Saída de Emergência"	—	—	—	—
4	Catarina Correia	29	Vila Nova de Santo André	"Solta-se o Beijo"	✔	—	—	✔
5	Carolina Brandão	24	Porto	"Angel"	—	—	✔	—
6	Vasco Poupino	19	Alpalhão	"Montinho da Serra"	—	—	—	—
7	Tiago Fumiko	36	Vila Nova de Gaia	"Zombie"	✔	✔	—	✔
8	Rita Luz	23	Portimão	"Deste-me Um Beijo e Vivi"	—	—	—	✔
9	Lara Rocha	19	Aveiro	"Stand Up"	—	—	—	—
10	Leonel Varela	19	Coimbra	"Heather"	✔	✔	—	—
11	Emanuel Dias	25	Santo Tirso	"You Found Me"	—	—	—	—
12	Leonor Martins	18	Cascais	"Memória"	✔	✔	—	—
13	Victoria Montiel	30	Porto	"Jolene"	✔	✔	✔	✔

=== Episode 6 (15 November) ===
Sixth episode's results
Order	Artist	Age	Hometown	Song	Coach's and artist's choices			
Order	Artist	Age	Hometown	Song	David & Mickael	Sónia	Fernando	Cláudia
1	Margarida Prieto			"Misty"	✔	✔	—	✔
2	Carlos Vilas Boas			"Na Escola"	—	—	✔	—
3	Luciana Silva			"Teenage Fantasy"	—	—	—	—
4	Leonor Gomes			"Georgia on My Mind"	✔	✔	—	—
5	Milai Guimarães			"Superstition"	—	—	—	—
6	Rita Serra			"Desfolhada portuguesa"	—	✔	—	✔
7	Constantino Sousa			"Clássico"	—	✔	—	—
8	Diro			"Let Me Love You"	—	—	—	—
9	Juliana Casado			"Procura Vã"	—	✔	—	—
10	Juli			"No Meu Lugar"	—	—	—	—
11	Fabiana Ferreira			"Nuvem"	✔	✔	—	—
12	Isamara Alves			"A Nossa Vez"	—	—	✔	—
13	Madalena Fernandes			"Sans toi"	✔	—	✔	—
14	Diogo Barbosa			"Alfaiate"	—	—	—	—

=== Episode 7 (29 November) ===
Seventh episode's results
Order	Artist	Age	Hometown	Song	Coach's and artist's choices			
Order	Artist	Age	Hometown	Song	David & Mickael	Sónia	Fernando	Cláudia
1								
2								
3								
4								
5								
6								
7								
8								
9								
10								
11								
12								
13								
