= The Voice Portugal season 11 =

The Voice Portugal
- Season 11
- Hosted by: Catarina Furtado; Catarina Maia (backstage)
- Coaches: Fernando Daniel; Sónia Tavares; António Zambujo; Sara Correia
- No. of contestants: 56
- Winner: José Bacelar
- Winning coach: António Zambujo
- Runner-up: Maria João Soares

Release
- Original network: RTP1
- Original release: 17 September 2023 – 7 January 2024

Season chronology
- Next → Season 12

The eleventh season of The Voice Portugal is a talent show broadcast on RTP1, which premiered on 17 September 2023. Marisa Liz, Dino d'Santiago, Diogo Piçarra, and Carolina Deslandes all exited the coaching panel and were replaced by returning coach António Zambujo, The Voice Kids coach Fernando Daniel, The Voice Gerações coach Sara Correia, and debutant Sónia Tavares. Catarina Furtado and Catarina Maia returned as main and backstage hostesses, respectively, while Vasco Palmeirim left the program.

José Bacelar from Team Zambujo won the competition on 7 January 2024, marking António Zambujo's third win as a coach. Also, this was the second time in the history of the show that the Top 2 were from the same team, as both Bacelar and runner-up Maria João Soares were from Team Zambujo. The first time this occurred was in season six with Marvi and Diana Castro from Team Marisa. Zambujo also became the fourth coach to win three times, after Marisa Liz, Anselmo Ralph and Fernando Daniel.

== Coaches ==
Coaches of The Voice Portugal season 11

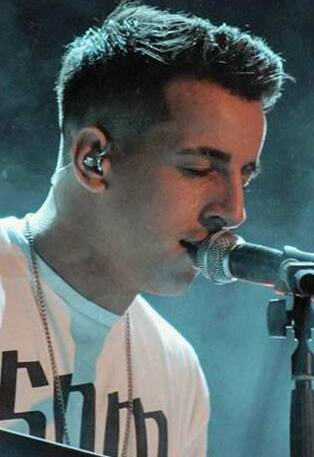
Fernando Daniel

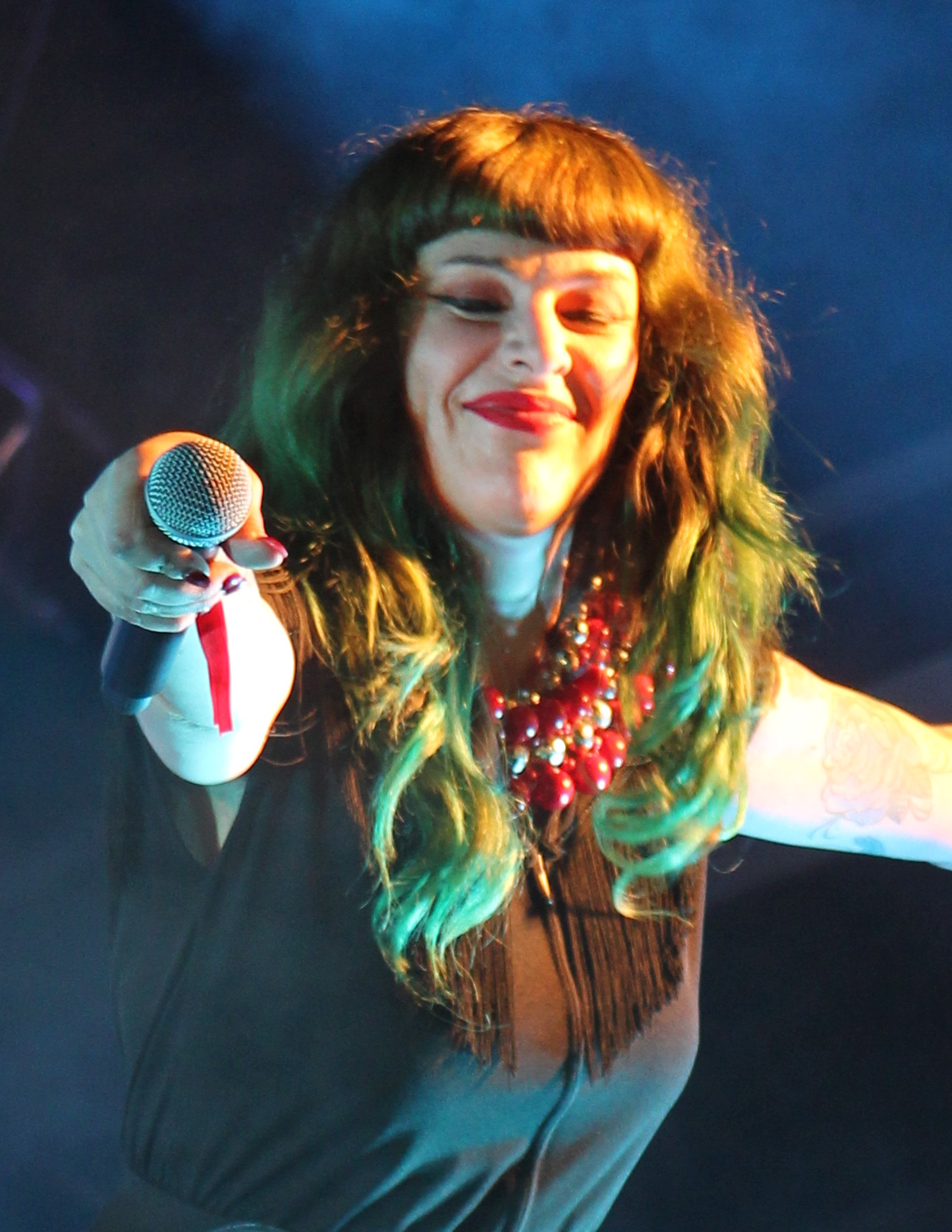
Sónia Tavares

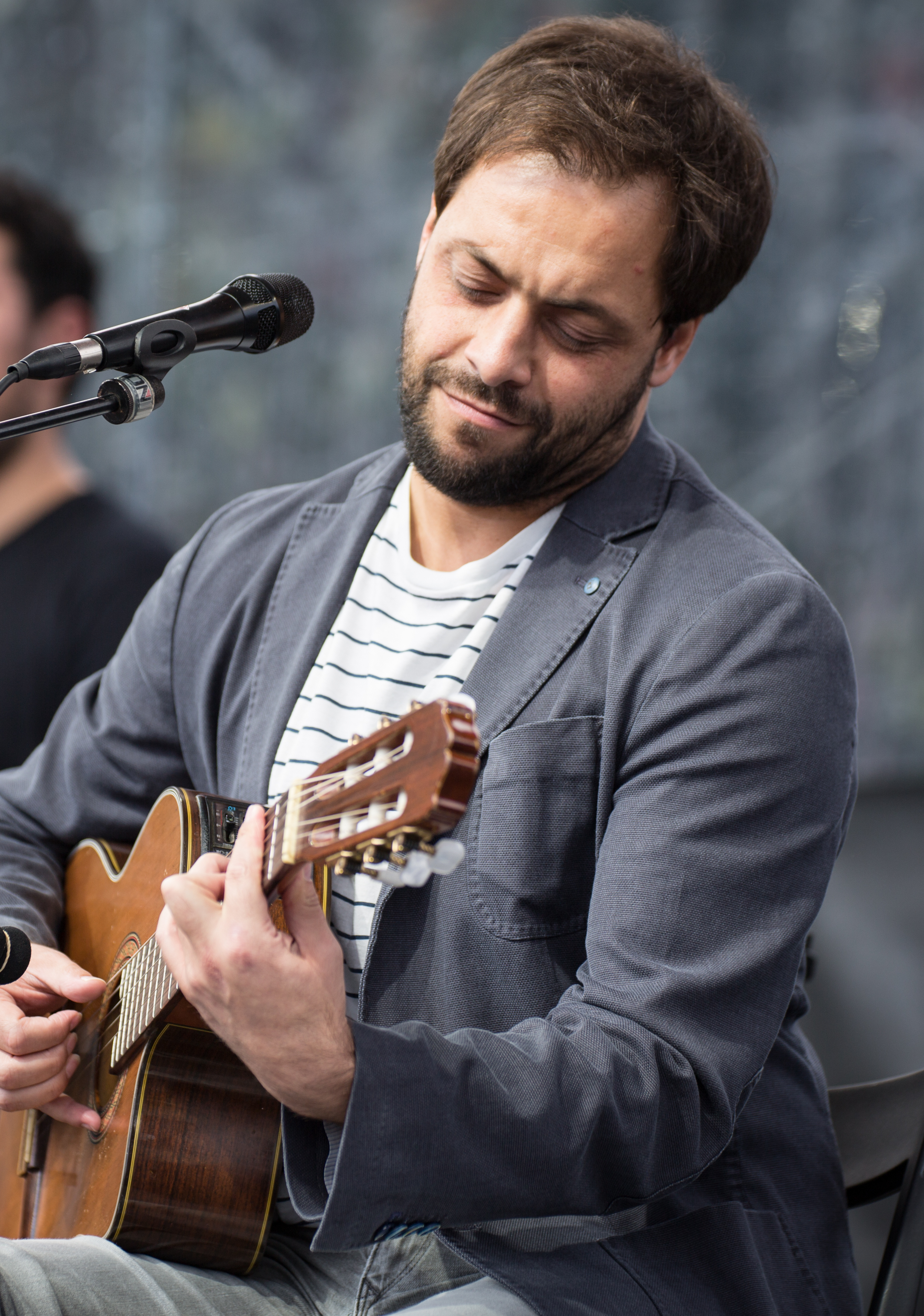
António Zambujo

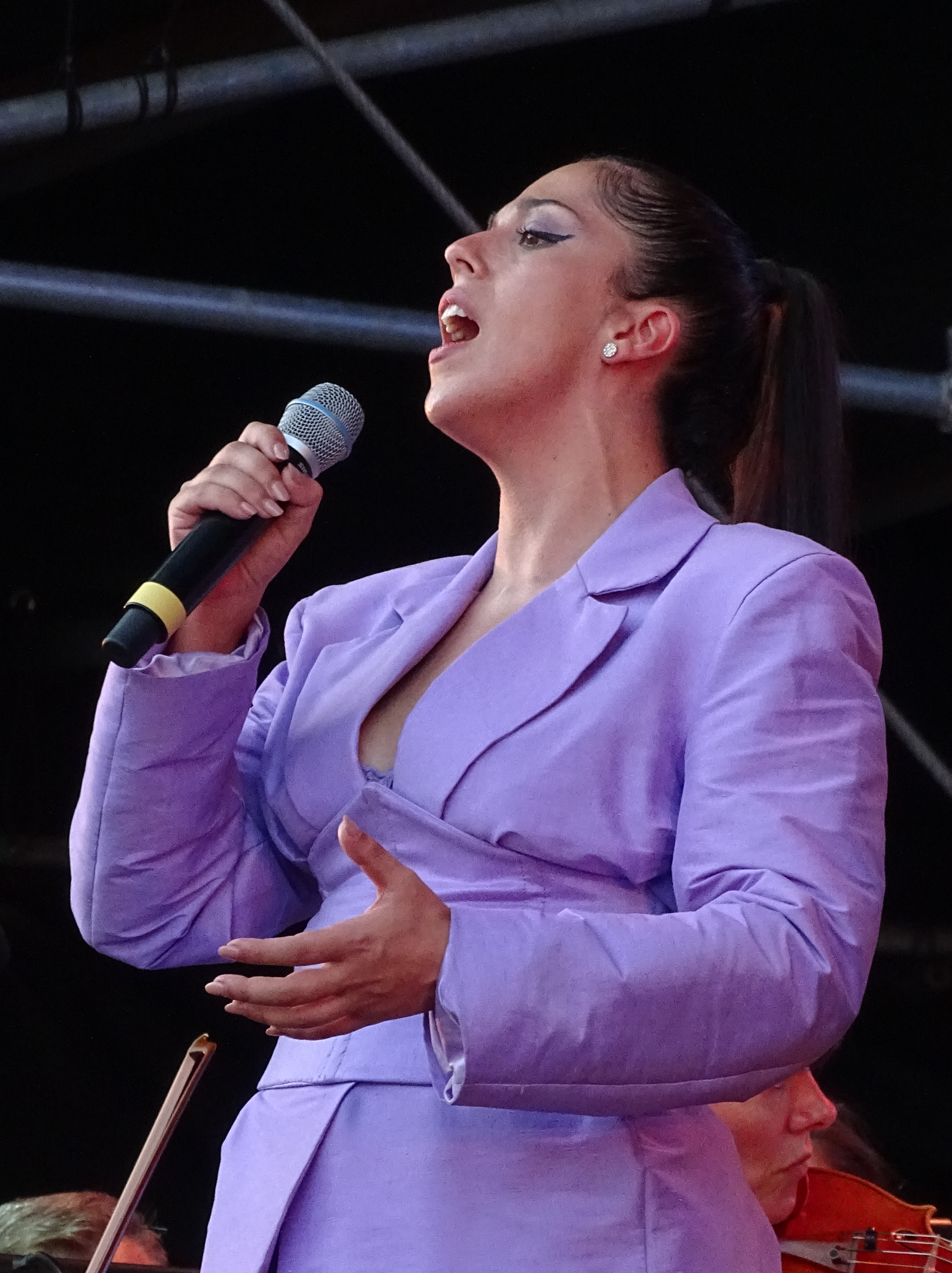
Sara Correia

=== Teams ===
Colour key

- Winner
- Runner-up
- Third place
- Fourth place
- Fifth place
- Eliminated in the Live shows
- Eliminated in the Knockouts
- Eliminated in the Battles
- Withdrew

Coaching teams
Coaches	Top 56 Artists				
Fernando Daniel					
Fernando Daniel	Guilherme Baptista	Herineu Prescindo	João Duarte	Cristiano Calisto	Miguel Correia
Fernando Daniel	San Oliver	Joana Graça	Beatriz, David & Miguel	Ana Catarina Henriques	Inês Henriques
Fernando Daniel	Francisco Ribeiro	João Alves	Luísa Chumbinho	João Maria Reis	
Sónia Tavares					
Sónia Tavares	Manuel Antunes	Daniel Pinto	Rafael Abrantes	Sofia Silva	Daniel Geadas
Sónia Tavares	Ariana Neves	Bruno de Sousa	Catarina Pereira	Zoe Eitner	Diogo Ramos
Sónia Tavares	Tiago Sousa	Ana Amorim	Inês Barros	Rui Serrinha	
António Zambujo					
António Zambujo	José Bacelar	Maria João Soares	Matilde Oliveira	Vânia Mussagy	Miguel Dias
António Zambujo	Rafael Magalhães	Renata Adegas	Elvira Brito e Faro	Beatriz Santos	Fabiana Sargaço
António Zambujo	Luís Fialho	Gonçalo Gomes	Rita Silva	Ana Paulo	
Sara Correia					
Sara Correia	Mafalda Vasques	Diogo Oliveira	Catarina Lima	Mariana Santana	Tiago Conceição
Sara Correia	Maria Branco	Pedro Oliveira	Maria Alice Faria	Jorge Belchior	Mário Bruno
Sara Correia	Tânia Esteves	Constaça Quinteiro	Gracinda Marques	Margarida Luz	
Note: underlined names are artists saved by the public in the live battles.

== Blind auditions ==
As in the previous season, in the blind auditions (provas cegas in Portuguese), each coach is given two "blocks" to use and prevent another coach from pitching for the artist. The "super block" buttons could be used at any time until the artist is asked which team they want to join. At the end of the blind auditions, Zambujo didn’t use his second super block.

Blind auditions colour key
✔	Coach pressed the "EU QUERO" button
	Artist joined this coach's team
	Artist was eliminated with no coach pressing their button
✘	Coach pressed the "EU QUERO" button, but was:
	Blocked by Fernando; Blocked by Sónia; Blocked by Zambujo; Blocked by Sara

=== Episode 1 (17 September 2023) ===
First episode's results
Order	Artist	Age	Song	Coach's and artist's choices			
Order	Artist	Age	Song	Fernando	Sónia	Zambujo	Sara
1	Ana Catarina Henriques	26	"Piece of My Heart"	✔	✘	✔	✔
2	Manuel Antunes	24	"Another Love"	✔	✔	✔	✔
3	Pedro Oliveira	29	"Anda Estragar-me os Planos"	✔	✔	✘	✔
4	Lauren Pinto	20	"All I Ask"	—	—	—	—
5	Miguel Dias	26	"I Don't Want to Set the World on Fire"	✔	✔	✔	✔
6	Bruno de Sousa	23	"Beggin'"	✔	✔	✔	✔
7	Susana Marques	29	"Silêncio e Tanta Gente"	—	—	—	—
8	João Maria Reis	22	"Gaivota"	✔	✔	✔	✔
9	Matilde Oliveira	15	"I Love You"	—	—	✔	✔
10	Gabriel Moreira	22	"Frágil"	—	—	—	—
11	Inês Barros	23	"Can't Hold Us"	—	✔	—	—
12	Rayane & Raquel Assis	22	"Shallow"	—	—	—	—
13	Gracinda Marques	77	"Rua dos Meus Ciúmes"	✔	✔	✔	✔
14	João Duarte	20	"Eu Sei que Vou-te Amar"	✔	✘	✔	✔

=== Episode 2 (24 September) ===
Second episode's results
Order	Artist	Age	Song	Coach's and artist's choices			
Order	Artist	Age	Song	Fernando	Sónia	Zambujo	Sara
1	Cristiano Calisto	18	"In the Name of Love"	✔	✔	✔	✔
2	Maria João Soares	19	"Os Meninos de Huambo"	—	—	✔	✔
3	Pedro Mendonça	20	"Best Part"	—	—	—	—
4	Catarina Pereira	18	"Maybe This Time"	—	✔	✔	✔
5	Mariana Santana	19	"Serenata"	—	—	✔	✔
6	Guilherme Baptista	16	"Nothing Compares 2 U"	✔	✔	✔	—
7	Rui Paulo	32	"Vocês Sabem Lá"	—	—	—	—
8	Catarina Lima	25	"I Don't Know My Name"	✔	✔	✘	✔
9	Rita Silva	31	"Fix You"	—	—	✔	—
10	Quintino Andrade	18	"A Nossa Vez"	—	—	—	—
11	Sofia Silva	17	"No Time to Die"	✔	✔	✔	✔
12	Joana Santos	40	"I Wanna Dance with Somebody"	—	—	—	—
13	Ana Paulo	33	"Lisboa à Noite"	—	—	✔	✔
14	Beatriz, David & Miguel	N/A	"E depois do adeus"	✔	—	✔	✔

=== Episode 3 (1 October) ===
Third episode's results
Order	Artist	Age	Song	Coach's and artist's choices			
Order	Artist	Age	Song	Fernando	Sónia	Zambujo	Sara
1	João Saraiva	23	"Meu Nome é Saudade"	—	—	—	—
2	Tânia Esteves	27	"Quando m'en vo'"	—	—	✔	✔
3	Herineu Prescindo	31	"Palace"	✔	✔	✔	✔
4	Elvira Brito e Faro	32	"Sonho Azul"	—	—	✔	✔
5	Inês Seco	25	"Ordinary People"	—	—	—	—
6	Diogo Ramos	33	"Cosmic Girl"	—	✔	—	—
7	Zoe Eitner	21	"People Help the People"	—	✔	✔	✔
8	Milu Afonso	28	"Part of Your World"	—	—	—	—
9	Francisco Ribeiro	23	"Perto de Mim"	✔	—	—	—
10	Mafalda Vasques	26	"Ao Sul"	—	—	✘	✔
11	Márcio Melo	33	"Todo o Tempo do Mundo"	—	—	—	—
12	Tiago Conceição	21	"Nem às Peredes Confesso"	—	—	✔	✔
13	Joana Graça	27	"Titanium"	✔	—	—	✔
14	Rafael Magalhães	26	"Ain't No Way"	✔	✔	✔	✔

=== Episode 4 (8 October) ===
Fourth episode's results
Order	Artist	Age	Song	Coach's and artist's choices			
Order	Artist	Age	Song	Fernando	Sónia	Zambujo	Sara
1	Renata Adegas	42	"Oceano"	✔	✔	✔	✔
2	Rui Serrinha	26	"Crazy in Love"	—	✔	—	✔
3	Francisco Matos	26	"In the Stars"	—	—	—	—
4	Luísa Chumbinho	24	"It Will Rain"	✔	—	—	✔
5	Mário Bruno	26	"Amor de Mel, Amor de Fel"	—	—	—	✔
6	Yara Rossi	19	"Onde Vais"	—	—	—	—
7	Tiago Sousa	23	"Kill Bill"	—	✔	✔	✔
8	Sofia Cardoso	21	"The Winner Takes It All"	—	—	—	—
9	San Oliver	31	"She Will Be Loved"	✔	—	—	—
10	Vânia Mussagy	32	"Meu Fado Meu"	—	—	✔	✔
11	Ayisha Iskandar	22	"I Will Always Love You"	—	—	—	—
12	Maria Branco	17	"Je Ne Regrette Rien"	—	—	—	✔
13	Rui Luís	33	"Autumn Leaves"	—	—	—	—
14	José Bacelar	18	"Can't Help Falling in Love"	✔	—	✔	✔

=== Episode 5 (15 October) ===
Fifth episode's results
Order	Artist	Age	Song	Coach's and artist's choices			
Order	Artist	Age	Song	Fernando	Sónia	Zambujo	Sara
1	Gonçalo Gomes	18	"Amar Pelos Dois"	—	—	✔	—
2	Miguel Correia	43	"Capitão Romance"	✔	—	✔	—
3	Maria João Durão	23	"Just the Two of Us"	—	—	—	—
4	João Ribeiro	23	"Como Antes"	—	—	—	—
5	Daniel Pinto	23	"Misty"	—	✔	✘	—
6	Constaça Quinteiro	23	"Como Seria"	—	—	—	✔
7	Afonso Pires	18	"Black"	—	—	—	—
8	João Alves	30	"Grow as We Go"	✔	—	✔	—
9	Mariana Pinheiro	17	"Wicked Game"	—	—	—	—
10	Daniel Geadas	19	"All I Want"	—	✔	—	—
11	Ana Cristina Santos	49	"La Llorona"	—	—	—	—
12	Adelaide Gradim	45	"Lágrima"	—	—	—	—
13	Ariana Neves	20	"Teenage Fantasy"	—	✔	—	—
14	Armine Khachykyan	23	"Future Lover"	—	—	—	—
15	Luís Fialho	20	"Quem Me Vê"	—	—	✔	✔
16	Ana Amorim	23	"Jolene"	✔	✔	✔	✔

=== Episode 6 (22 October) ===
Sixth episode's results
Order	Artist	Age	Song	Coach's and artist's choices			
Order	Artist	Age	Song	Fernando	Sónia	Zambujo	Sara
1	Isaac Krasmann	18	"O Primeiro Dia"	—	—	—	—
2	Inês Henriques	21	"Toxic"	✔	—	—	✘
3	Jorge Belchior	24	"Tenho de Abalar"	Team full	—	—	✔
4	David Eufrásio	23	"Bad Romance"	Team full	—	—	—
5	Beatriz Santos	22	"Sabor A Mi"	Team full	—	✔	—
6	Diogo Oliveira	15	"In Case You Didn't Know"	Team full	—	—	✔
7	Teresa Esteves	25	"Break My Heart Again"	Team full	—	—	—
8	Diogo Félix	22	"Canção de Engate"	Team full	—	—	—
9	Fabiana Sargaço	16	"As Regras da Sensatez"	Team full	—	✔	✔
10	Vitória Pacheco	30	"Problema de Expressão"	Team full	—	Team full	—
11	Margarida Luz	16	"I See Red"	Team full	—	Team full	✔
12	Manuel Madeiras	23	"Zorro"	Team full	—	Team full	—
13	Rafael Abrantes	23	"The Greatest Love of All"	Team full	✔	Team full	—
14	Filipe & Miguel	17	"River Deep Mountain High"	Team full	Team full	Team full	—
15	Andreia & Lara	N/A	"All I Want"	Team full	Team full	Team full	—
16	Maria Alice Faria	67	"Povo Que Lavas No Rio"	Team full	Team full	Team full	✔

== Battles ==
The battles (called batalhas in Portuguese) began on 29 October. For the first time in the history of The Voice globally, the battles' stage was broadcast live. Teams Fernando and Sara performed on the first night of battles, and Teams Sónia and Zambujo performed on the second night.

Battles colour key
Artist won the battle and advanced to the knockouts
Artist lost the battle but was saved by the public's vote
Artist lost the battle and was eliminated

=== Episode 7 (29 October) ===
Seventh episode's results
Order	Coach	Winner	Song	Loser
1	Fernando	Miguel Correia	"Na Escola"	João Maria Reis
2	Sara	Catarina Lima	"You've Got the Love"	Margarida Luz
3	Fernando	Beatriz, David & Miguel	"Talvez"	Luísa Chumbinho
4	Sara	Maria Alice Faria	"Ai Mouraria"	Gracinda Marques
5	Fernando	Herineu Prescindo	"Visiting Hours"	João Alves
6	Sara	Mariana Santana	"Não me Importo"	Constaça Quinteiro
7	Fernando	João Duarte	"What Was I Made For?"	Francisco Ribeiro
8	Sara	Maria Branco	"The Winner Takes It All"	Tânia Esteves
9	Fernando	Cristiano Calisto	"Foi Assim que Aconteceu"	Inês Henriques
10	Sara	Tiago Conceição	"Lisboa Menina e Moça"	Mário Bruno
11	Fernando	Joana Graça	"The Story"	Ana Catarina Henriques
12	Sara	Pedro Oliveira	"Amanhã"	Diogo Oliveira
13	Fernando	Guilherme Baptista	"One"	San Oliver
14	Sara	Mafalda Vasques	"Rio D'Água"	Jorge Belchior

=== Episode 8 (5 November) ===
Eighth episode's results
Order	Coach	Winner	Song	Loser
1	Sónia	Sofia Silva	"Lovely"	Rui Serrinha
2	Zambujo	Vânia Mussagy	"Melhor de Mim"	Ana Paulo
3	Sónia	Daniel Pinto	"Your Song"	Rafael Abrantes
4	Zambujo	Matilde Oliveira	"Vampire"	Rita Silva
5	Sónia	Ariana Neves	"Dilúvio"	Inês Barros
6	Zambujo	José Bacelar	"Georgia on My Mind"	Gonçalo Gomes
7	Sónia	Daniel Geadas	"Rolling in the Deep"	Ana Amorim
8	Zambujo	Miguel Dias	"Ao Teu Ouvido"	Luís Fialho
9	Sónia	Manuel Antunes	"Tattoo"	Tiago Sousa
10	Zambujo	Elvira Brito e Faro	"Adeus, Tristeza"	Maria João Soares
11	Zambujo	Renata Adegas	"Wave"	Fabiana Sargaço
12	Sónia	Bruno de Sousa	"Feel It Still"	Diogo Ramos
13	Sónia	Catarina Pereira	"Ouvi Dizer"	Zoe Eitner
14	Zambujo	Rafael Magalhães	"Stand by Me"	Beatriz Santos

== Knockouts ==
The knockouts (called tira-teimas in Portuguese) began on 12 November. Like the battles, the knockouts were broadcast live. Four artists from each team performed on the first night, and the other four performed on the second night. The artist, from each team, with the highest number of votes from the public moves on to the live shows, and then each coach saves one of the remaining three artists to move on as well.

Knockouts colour key
Artist won the public's vote and advanced to the live shows
Artist was saved by their coach and advanced to the live shows
Artist lost the public's vote and was eliminated

=== Episode 9 (12 November) ===
Ninth episode's results
Order	Coach	Artist	Song	Result
1	Fernando	Cristiano Calisto	"This City"	Fernando's choice
2	Fernando	Beatriz, David & Miguel	"Volta"	Eliminated
3	Fernando	Joana Graça	"Hurt"	Eliminated
4	Fernando	Herineu Prescindo	"All of Me"	Public's vote
5	Sara	Maria Alice Faria	"Canoas do Tejo"	Eliminated
6	Sara	Pedro Oliveira	"Jura"	Eliminated
7	Sara	Mariana Santana	"I'd Rather Go Blind"	Sara's choice
8	Sara	Mafalda Vasques	"Eu Sei"	Public's vote
9	Sónia	Manuel Antunes	"The Night We Met"	Sónia's choice
10	Sónia	Catarina Pereira	"Son of a Preacher Man"	Eliminated
11	Sónia	Bruno de Sousa	"Estou Além"	Eliminated
12	Sónia	Daniel Pinto	"Nem eu"	Public's vote
13	Zambujo	Elvira Brito e Faro	"Papel Principal"	Eliminated
14	Zambujo	Renata Adegas	"Make You Feel My Love"	Eliminated
15	Zambujo	José Bacelar	"Rosinha dos Limões"	Public's vote
16	Zambujo	Matilde Oliveira	"Take Me to Church"	Zambujo's choice

=== Episode 10 (19 November) ===
Tenth episode's results
Order	Coach	Artist	Song	Result
1	Sara	Diogo Oliveira	"Canção do Engate"	Public's vote
2	Sara	Catarina Lima	"Liability"	Sara's choice
3	Sara	Tiago Conceição	"Escrevi o Teu Nome no Vento"	Eliminated
4	Sara	Maria Branco	"Hallelujah"	Eliminated
5	Sónia	Rafael Abrantes	"Hero"	Public's vote
6	Sónia	Ariana Neves	"Desfolhada portuguesa"	Eliminated
7	Sónia	Daniel Geadas	"Heal"	Sónia's choice
8	Sónia	Sofia Silva	"Don't Watch Me Cry"	Eliminated
9	Zambujo	Rafael Magalhães	"As Rosas Não Falam"	Eliminated
10	Zambujo	Vânia Mussagy	"The Show Must Go On"	Zambujo's choice
11	Zambujo	Maria João Soares	"Canção de Embalar"	Public's vote
12	Zambujo	Miguel Dias	"She"	Eliminated
13	Fernando	Miguel Correia	"Sete Mares"	Eliminated
14	Fernando	San Oliver	"Free Fallin'"	Eliminated
15	Fernando	Guilherme Baptista	"Numb"	Public's vote
16	Fernando	João Duarte	"É Isso Aí"	Fernando's choice

== Live shows ==
Live shows (Galas em direto) colour key
Artist saved by the public's vote
Artist was saved by their coach
Artist received a "Wild card"
Artist was placed in the bottom group and competed for a save
Artist was eliminated

=== Episode 11 (26 November) ===
Prior to this episode, Daniel Geadas from Team Sónia withdrew from the competition for personal reasons. Because of this, the two eliminated artists on Team Sónia from episode nine – where Geadas was selected to advance – were up to public's vote to fill in for his spot. Sofia Silva received the most number of votes.

Eleventh episode's results
Order	Coach	Artist	Song	Result
1	Fernando	João Duarte	"Purple Rain"	Fernando's choice
2	Sara	Catarina Lima	"Cavalo À Solta"	Sara's choice
3	Sónia	Daniel Pinto	"Feeling Good"	Public's vote
4	Zambujo	Maria João Soares	"A Gente Vai Continuar"	Public's vote
5	Fernando	Guilherme Baptista	"Reason"	Public's vote
6	Sara	Mafalda Vasques	"Mãe Negra"	Public's vote
7	Fernando	Cristiano Calisto	"Iris"	Eliminated
8	Sónia	Rafael Abrantes	"Writing's on the Wall"	Public's vote
9	Fernando	Herineu Prescindo	"You Are the Reason"	Public's vote
10	Sara	Mariana Santana	"Eu Não se Quem te Perdeu"	Eliminated
11	Zambujo	José Bacelar	"Delilah"	Public's vote
12	Sónia	Sofia Silva	"Secret Love Song"	Eliminated
13	Sara	Diogo Oliveira	"Carta"	Public's vote
14	Zambujo	Matilde Oliveira	"I Didn't Mean It"	Zambujo's choice
15	Sónia	Manuel Antunes	"Guarda-me Esta Noite"	Sónia's choice
16	Zambujo	Vânia Mussagy	"Easy on Me"	Eliminated

=== Episode 12 (3 December) ===
Twelfth episode's results
Order	Coach	Artist	Song	Result
1	Sónia	Manuel Antunes	"Hometown Glory"	Sónia's choice
2	Zambujo	Maria João Soares	"Sol de Inverno"	Public's vote
3	Fernando	Guilherme Baptista	"It's My Life"	Public's vote
4	Sara	Catarina Lima	"Não És Homem Para Mim"	Eliminated
5	Sónia	Daniel Pinto	"Porto Sentido"	Public's vote
6	Zambujo	Matilde Oliveira	"Happier Than Ever"	Eliminated
7	Fernando	João Duarte	"Para Os Braços da Minha Mãe"	Eliminated
8	Sónia	Rafael Abrantes	"Endless Love"	Eliminated
9	Sara	Diogo Oliveira	"The Scientist"	Public's vote
10	Zambujo	José Bacelar	"Quero Que Vá Tudo Pro Inferno"	Zambujo's choice
11	Fernando	Herineu Prescindo	"Shallow"	Fernando's choice
12	Sara	Mafalda Vasques	"Canção do Mar"	Sara's choice

=== Episode 13 (10 December) ===
Thirteenth episode's results
Order	Coach	Artist	Song	Result
1	Zambujo	José Bacelar	"My Way"	Public's vote
2	Fernando	Guilherme Baptista	"Ouvi Dizer"	Public's vote
3	Sónia	Daniel Pinto	"Kiss from a Rose"	Public's vote
4	Sara	Diogo Oliveira	"Wish You the Best"	Eliminated
5	Zambujo	Maria João Soares	"Rancho Fundo"	Wild card
6	Sara	Mafalda Vasques	"Ó Gente da Minha Terra"	Public's vote
7	Sónia	Manuel Antunes	"Urgentemente"	Wild card
8	Fernando	Herineu Prescindo	"Rise Up"	Eliminated

=== Episode 14 (17 December) ===
Fourteenth episode's results
Round	Coach	Artist	Order	Solo song	Order	Duet with coach	Result
Round one	Sónia	Daniel Pinto	1	"Amar pelos dois"	7	"The Lady Is a Tramp"	Bottom three
Round one	Zambujo	José Bacelar	10	"Take Me Home, Country Roads"	2	"It's Now or Never"	Public's vote
Round one	Sara	Mafalda Vasques	3	"Luar do Sertão"	9	"Povo que lavas no rio"	Bottom three
Round one	Fernando	Guilherme Baptista	8	"Sweet Child o' Mine"	4	"Creep"	Public's vote
Round one	Sónia	Manuel Antunes	5	"Não Vás Já"	11	"Born to Die"	Bottom three
Round one	Zambujo	Maria João Soares	6	"O Pastor"	12	"Restolho"	Public's vote
Round two	Sara	Mafalda Vasques	1	"Ao Sul"			Wild card
Round two	Sónia	Daniel Pinto	2	"Misty"			Eliminated
Round two	Sónia	Manuel Antunes	3	"Another Love"			Wild card

=== Episode 15: Final (7 January) ===
Fifteenth episode's results
Round	Coach	Artist	Order	Solo song	Order	Duet with guest	Result
Round one	Sara	Mafalda Vasques	1	"Amor a Portugal"	6	"Emoções" (with Raquel Tavares)	Fourth place
Round one	Zambujo	José Bacelar	7	"Unchained Melody"	2	"A Cor do Teu Baton" (with Herman José)	Top 3
Round one	Fernando	Guilherme Baptista	3	"Use Somebody"	10	"Nada A Perder" (with Carlão)	Top 3
Round one	Zambujo	Maria João Soares	9	"Balada de Outono"	4	"Afinal Havia Outra" (with Diana Lucas)	Top 3
Round one	Sónia	Manuel Antunes	5	"What Was I Made For?"	8	"Eu Sei que Vou Te Amar" (with Maria João)	Fifth place
Round two	Fernando	Guilherme Baptista	1	"Numb"			Third place
Round two	Zambujo	José Bacelar	2	"My Way"			Winner
Round two	Zambujo	Maria João Soares	3	"Sol de Inverno"			Runner-up

== Elimination chart ==
Teams colour key

- Team Fernando
- Team Sónia
- Team Zambujo
- Team Sara

Results colour key

- Winner
- Runner-up
- Third place
- Fourth place
- Fifth place
- Saved by the "Wild card"
- Saved by public vote
- Saved by coach
- Eliminated

Results per week
Artist	Week 1	Week 2	Week 3	Week 4	Week 5
José Bacelar	Safe	Safe	Safe	Safe	Winner
Maria João Soares	Safe	Safe	Safe	Safe	Runner-up
Guilherme Baptista	Safe	Safe	Safe	Safe	3rd Place
Mafalda Vasques	Safe	Safe	Safe	Safe	4th Place
Manuel Antunes	Safe	Safe	Safe	Safe	5th Place
Daniel Pinto	Safe	Safe	Safe	Eliminated	
Diogo Oliveira	Safe	Safe	Eliminated		
Herineu Prescindo	Safe	Safe	Eliminated		
Catarina Lima	Safe	Eliminated			
João Duarte	Safe	Eliminated			
Matilde Oliveira	Safe	Eliminated			
Rafael Abrantes	Safe	Eliminated			
Cristiano Calisto	Eliminated				
Mariana Santana	Eliminated				
Sofia Silva	Eliminated				
Vânia Mussagy	Eliminated				
