= Maria da Nazaré =

Portuguese fado singer (1946–2025)

- Born: Maria da Nazaré Martins; 9 February 1946; Barreiro, Portugal
- Died: 4 July 2025 (aged 79); Corroios, Portugal
- Occupation: Fado singer

Maria da Nazaré Martins (1946–2025) was a Portuguese fado singer.

== Early life ==
Da Nazaré was born on 9 February 1946 in Barreiro in the Setúbal District to the south of the Portuguese capital, Lisbon. At that time Barreiro was one of the most prominent industrial areas in Portugal. As a young girl, she moved with her mother to the Campo de Ourique neighbourhood of Lisbon. It was there that she began to sing, first at nights with friends, and soon after as a contributor to shows for workers organized by the former Fundação Nacional para Alegria no Trabalho (National Foundation for Joy at Work – FNAT), a body set up by the Estado Novo dictatorship.

== Career ==
At 17, she joined the cast of artists working with the former Emissora Nacional, the state broadcaster. She travelled around Portugal singing at nights in shows for workers that were broadcast on the radio on a show called Evening for Workers. In 1964 she won the annual Grande Noite do Fado competition, using the pseudonym Celly Santos. She would repeat the victory using her own name in the following year.

These victories were the springboard for a career that lasted over 50 years. Da Nazaré performed in various fado houses in Lisbon, such as Lisboa à Noite, O Embuçado, Senhor Vinho, Clube do Fado, and Bacalhau de Molho. She also performed internationally, visiting Angola, Brazil, Mozambique, Belgium, Denmark, Finland, Sweden, Spain, and the United Kingdom, among others. She issued several solo albums, as well as collaborating with others, including Fernando Farinha and the bullfighter José Mestre Baptista. She was frequently asked to sing at private events and on television programmes. As well as her club performances, she made many appearances at the Belém Cultural Center, at the Aula Magna of the University of Lisbon, at the Lisbon City Festival and at the Communist Party of Portugal's annual Avante! festival.

In 2007, she was invited to participate in the film, Fados, directed by Carlos Saura, together with Vicente da Câmara, Ana Sofia Varela, Carminho, Pedro Moutinho and the Brazilian singer Chico Buarque. In 2017 she participated in the show Masters of Fado alongside António Rocha, Filipe Duarte, Maria Armanda, and others, jointly produced by the Fado Museum in Lisbon and the Belém Cultural Center. In 2019, she recorded the album Regressos (Returns) with António Passão, featuring duets and solo performances. In December 2024, she appeared on the Christmas gala of The Voice Portugal, where she performed the song Rosa Caída alongside the young fado singer Sara Correia.

== Recognitions and awards ==
In addition to her two victories in the Grande Noite do Fado, Da Nazaré was given the Casa da Imprensa Lifetime Achievement Award in 2003. In 2013 she received the Amália Award for Best Performer in that year.

== Death ==
Da Nazaré died on 4 July 2025 in Corroios in the municipality of Seixal. In sending a message of condolences, the Portuguese prime minister Luís Montenegro noted that she was the "owner of a unique voice".
