= Tiago Bettencourt =

Portuguese singer-songwriter

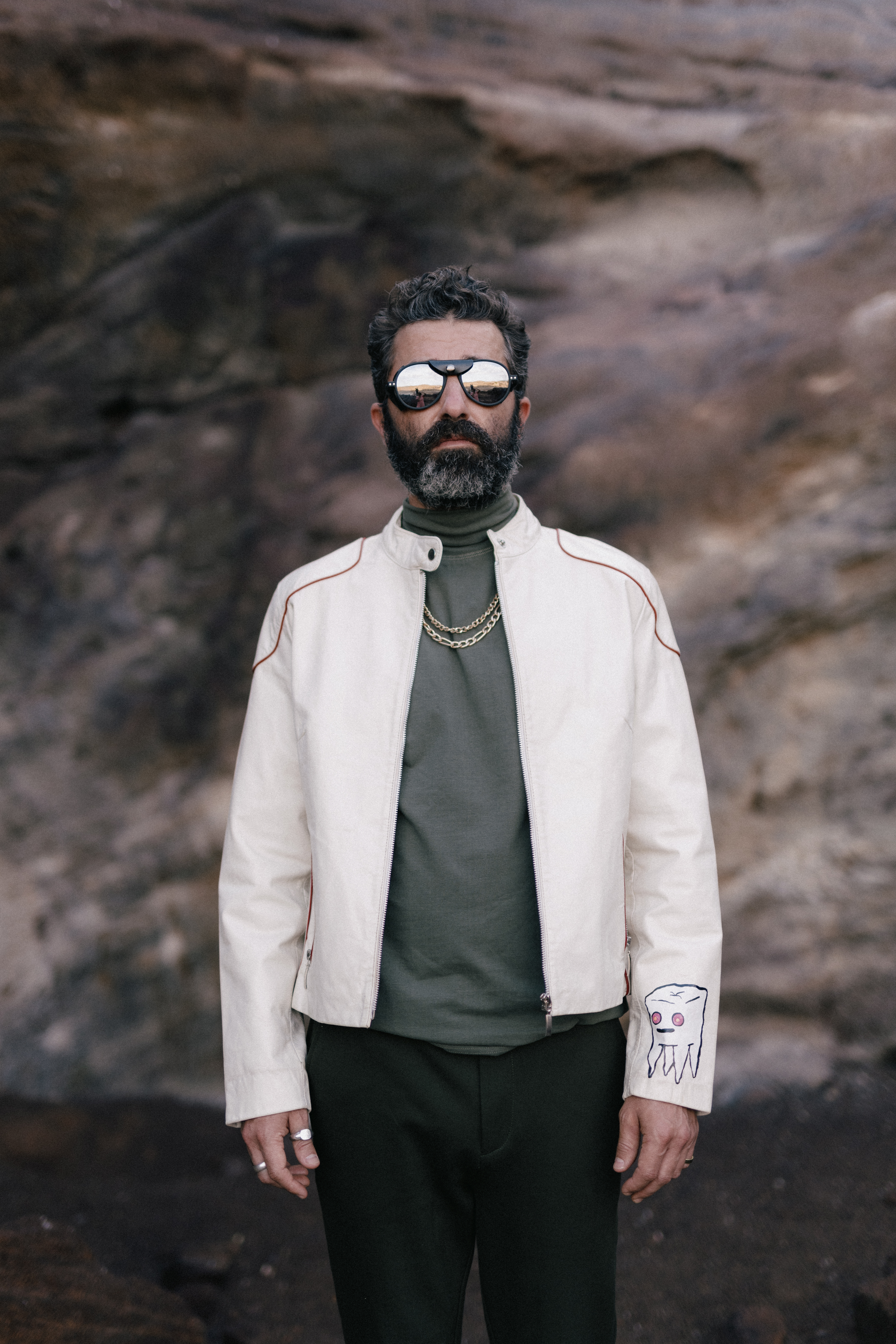
Tiago Bettencourt

Tiago de Albergaria Pinheiro Goulart de Bettencourt (born 16 September 1979) is a Portuguese singer-songwriter.

== Personal life ==
Tiago Bettencourt was born in Coimbra and later moved to Lisbon. His father was born in São Jorge Island, Azores; his mother is from Coimbra. Together with his brother, João, he attended the Colégio D. Luísa Sigea in Estoril. His mother was a teacher of Portuguese at the Salesian School in Estoril. Later he attended Liceu S. João and earned a degree in architecture from Universidade Lusiada.

== Toranja ==
Bettencourt was the lead singer of the band Toranja. In 2003, they released their debut album Esquissos, which sold over 60,000 copies. The band announced an indefinite hiatus in 2006.

== Solo career ==
After Toranja, Bettencourt left Portugal for Canada to record his first solo album at the Hotel2Tango studios in Montreal, the studio that produced the successful album Funeral by Arcade Fire. The producer was Howard Bilerman. Here, he worked with his backing band, Mantha, composed of Pedro Gonçalves and João Lencastre. The result of the recording sessions was released as O Jardim ("The Garden" in Portuguese) in 2007. The song "Canção Simples" (Simple Song) was a major hit. Their second album, Em Fuga, was released in 2010, followed by Tiago Na Toca & Os Poetas in 2011 and Acústico in 2012. The latter album contained "unplugged" versions of earlier songs, performed with guests including Concerto Moderno, Lura, and Jorge Palma.

In 2014 his album Do Principio was released, consisting of 12 songs including "Aquilo Que Eu Não Fiz", a song with a strong political message although Tiago said in an interview that it was based only on a childhood experience.

In 2020 he released Rumo ao Eclipse. He states that it talks about choices, struggles, hurt and indignation, detachment, relief, acceptance, home, and freedom. "Trégua", "Dança", "Viagem" and "Não Queiras Mais de Mim" were the singles that showcased the album.

In May 2026, he participated in a benefit concert to raise funds for the central region of Portugal, which was devastated in January 2026 by Storm Kristin.

== Other appearances ==
Bettencourt had a stint on the Portuguese television station TVI program Canta Por Mim (Sing For Me) as a celebrity where he sang alongside Dalila Carmo. They were together until the final, where he qualified for second position.

== Discography ==
- O Jardim (2007)
- Em Fuga (2010)
- Tiago Na Toca & Os Poetas (2011)
- Acústico (2012)
- Do Princípio (2014)
- A Procura (2017)
- Rumo ao Eclipse (2020)

== Ancestry ==
Ancestors of Tiago Bettencourt

16. Manuel Inácio da Silveira Bettencourt
8. João Euthymio de Bettencourt
17. Maria Jesuína da Silveira
4. João Goulart de Bettencourt
18. José da Silveira Goulart
9. Maria Laudolinda da Silveira Goulart
19. Maria Josefa de Bettencourt
2. João Amândio Teixeira Goulart de Bettencourt
5. Maria Dulce de Oliveira Teixeira
1. Tiago de Albergaria Pinheiro Goulart de Bettencourt
3. Maria José de Vasconcelos de Albergaria Pinheiro

=== Patrilineal descent ===
Patrilineal descent

Tiago's patriline is the line from which he is descended father to son.

1. Jorge Oliveira de Lemos, 1707–
2. Manuel Silveira de Oliveira, 1728–
3. José da Silveira, 1779–
4. António da Silveira, 1810–1875
5. Manuel Inácio da Silveira Bettencourt, 1838–1924
6. João Euthymio de Bettencourt, 1878–1948
7. João Goulart de Bettencourt, 1914–1987
8. João Amândio Teixeira Goulart de Bettencourt, b. 1945
9. Tiago de Albergaria Pinheiro Goulart de Bettencourt, b. 1979
