= Sónia Tavares (singer) =

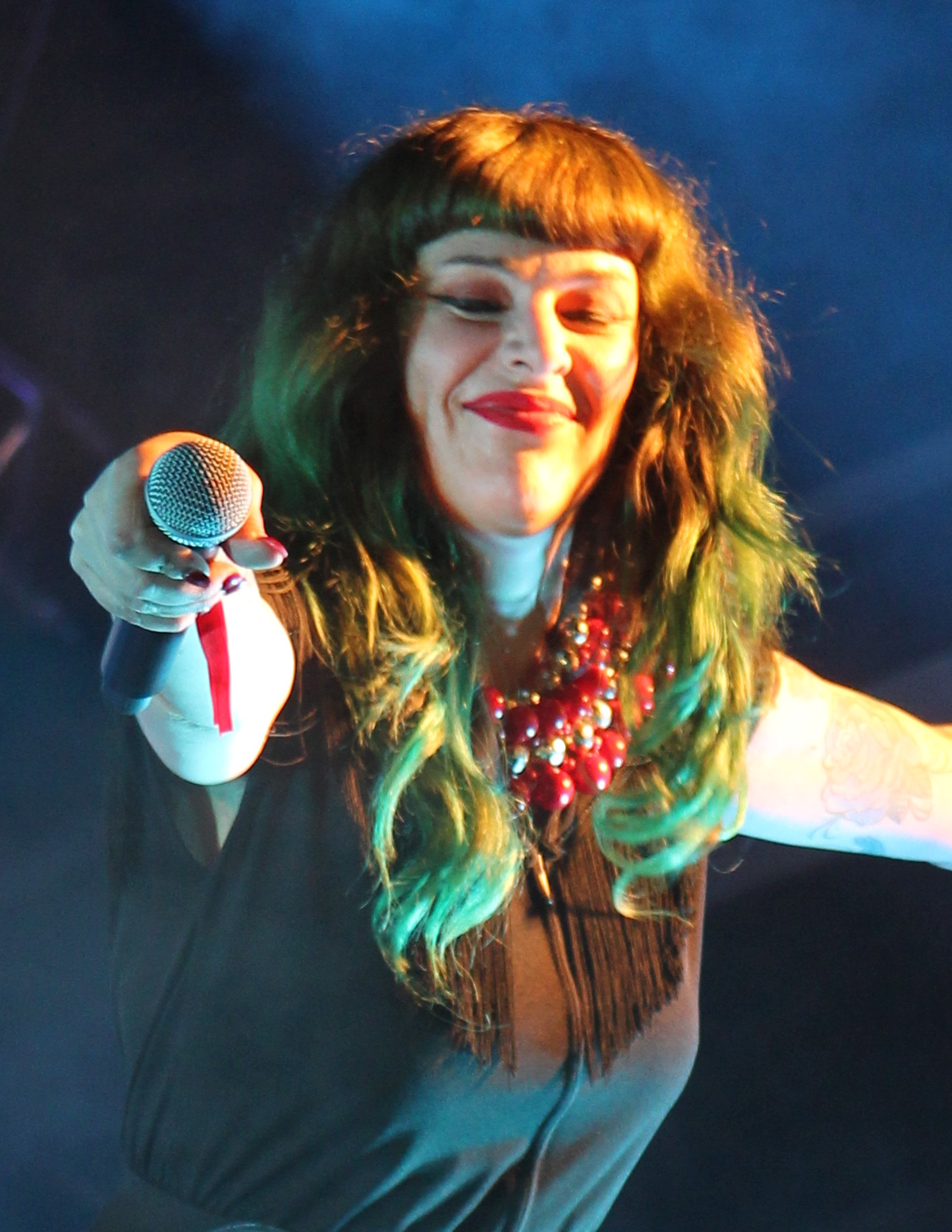
- Tavares in 2018

Background information
- Born: Sónia Cristina Pascoal Tavares; 11 March 1977 (age 49)
- Origin: Alcobaça, Portugal
- Genres: Pop, Alternative
- Occupation: Singer
- Instruments: Vocals
- Label: La Folie
- Spouse: Fernando Ribeiro

Sónia Cristina Pascoal Tavares (born 11 March 1977) is a Portuguese singer who is best known as the lead vocalist of The Gift. Beyond her work in The Gift, Tavares has collaborated with other musicians of various genres in the Portuguese music scene. She has also appeared as a television personality as a judge and mentor on the Portuguese shows Factor X (2013–2014) and The Voice Portugal (2023–present).

== Career ==
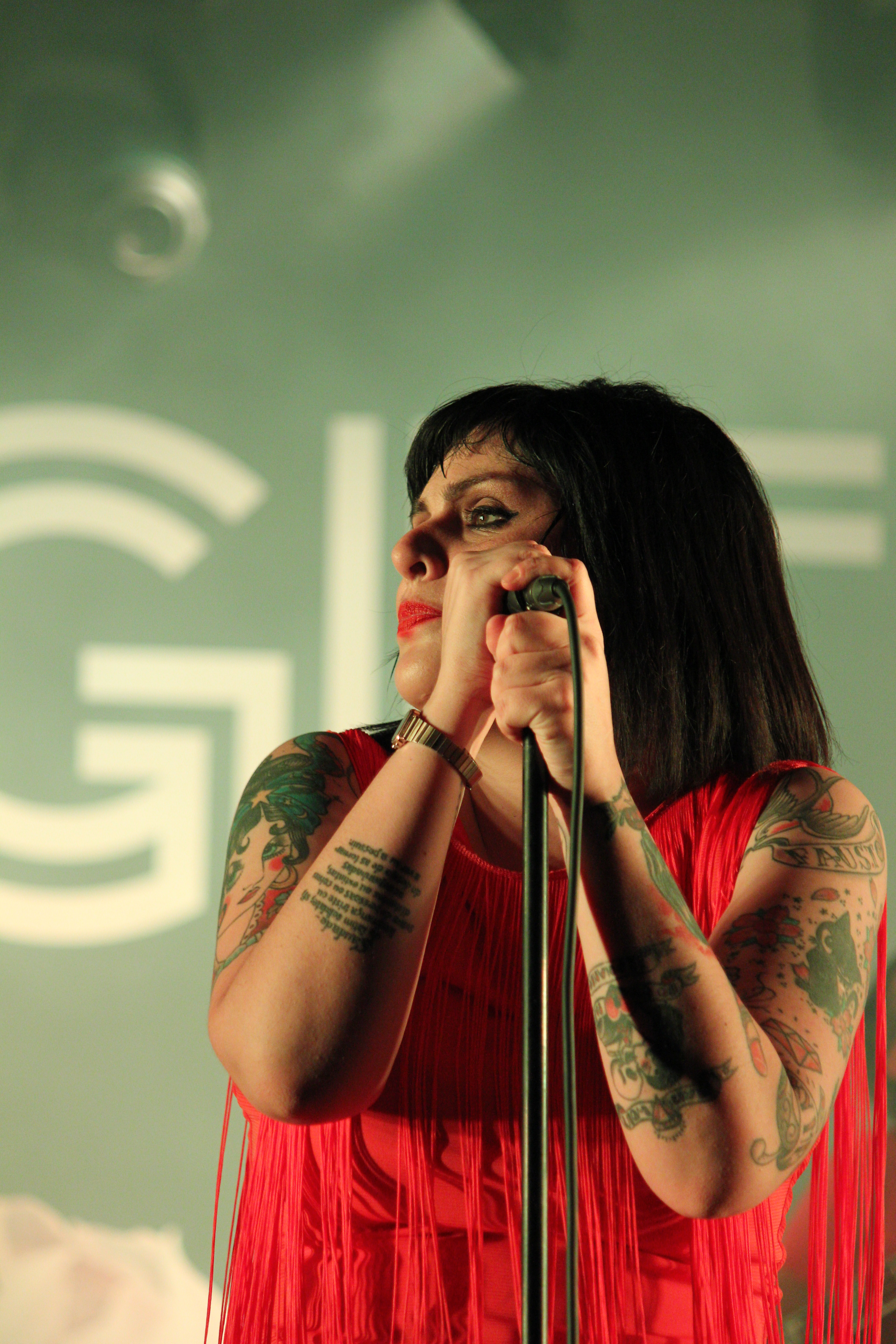
Tavares performing in Alcanena in 2016

In September 1994, Tavares, Nuno Gonçalves, Miguel Ribeiro, and Ricardo Braga registered for the Concurso de Música Moderna (Modern Music Contest) in Alcobaça. The band would end up in second place, and following this exposure, the band's popularity grew.

In 2000, Tavares and Gonçalves participated in several live performances of Rodrigo Leão's album, Alma Mater, where they interpret the song "A Casa", originally performed by Adriana Calcanhotto. She also, in the same year, participated in one of the versions of "Dama Dada" by Cool Hipnoise. Tavares also collaborated on three songs from Leão's album Cinema in 2004.

In 2005 Tavares, alongside The Gift, won the MTV Europe award for best Portuguese act.

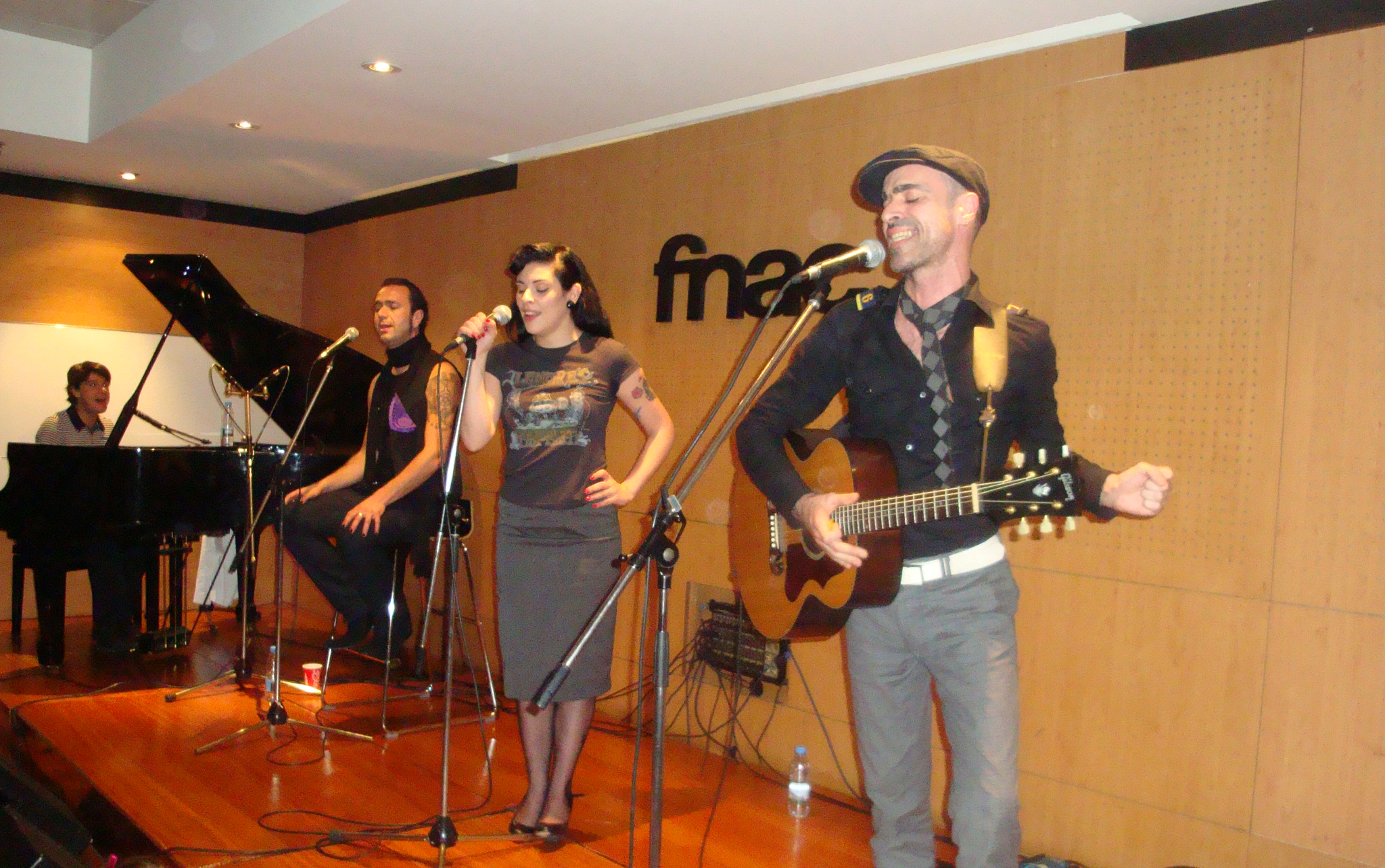
Tavares (center) performing with Hoje in 2009

In 2009 she became part of the Hoje project, with fellow band members from The Gift, in which she gives voice to Amália Rodrigues' fado songs.

In 2013, Tavares became a mentor on Factor X, mentoring the winning act, Berg. She returned for her second season in 2014.

In 2020 and 2021, she was an "investigator" in the two seasons of the program A Máscara.

Since 2023, Tavares has been featured as a coach on The Voice Portugal, for four of its seasons. At the conclusion of her third season, Tavares became the winning coach when her final artist, Rafael Alves, won the season.

== Personal life ==
In 2017, Tavares married Fernando Ribeiro, lead vocalist of the band Moonspell, after eight years together. They have a son, born in 2012, and live in Alcobaça.

== Discography ==
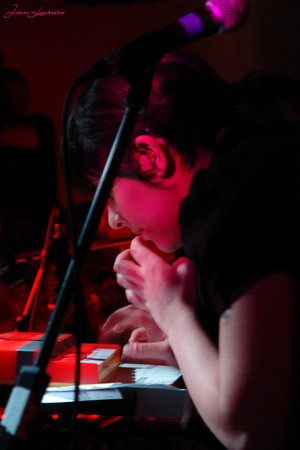
Tavares in 2006

=== Albums ===
==== With The Gift ====
- 1997 - Digital Atmosphere
- 1998 - Vinyl
- 2001 - Film
- 2004 - AM-FM
- 2006 - Fácil de Entender
- 2011 - Explode
- 2012 - Primavera
- 2015 - 20
- 2017 - Altar
- 2019 - Verão
- 2022 - Coral

==== Without The Gift ====
- 2000 - Cool Hipnoise - Música Exótica para filmes, rádio e televisão
- 2001 - Rodrigo Leão - Pasión
- 2004 - Rodrigo Leão - Cinema
- 2009 - Hoje - Amália Hoje

== Filmography ==
Year	Program	Notes
2013-2014	Factor X	Mentor, winning mentor 2013
2020-2021	A Máscara	Panelist
2023-present	The Voice Portugal	Coach, seasons 11, 12, and 13
