= Sara Correia =

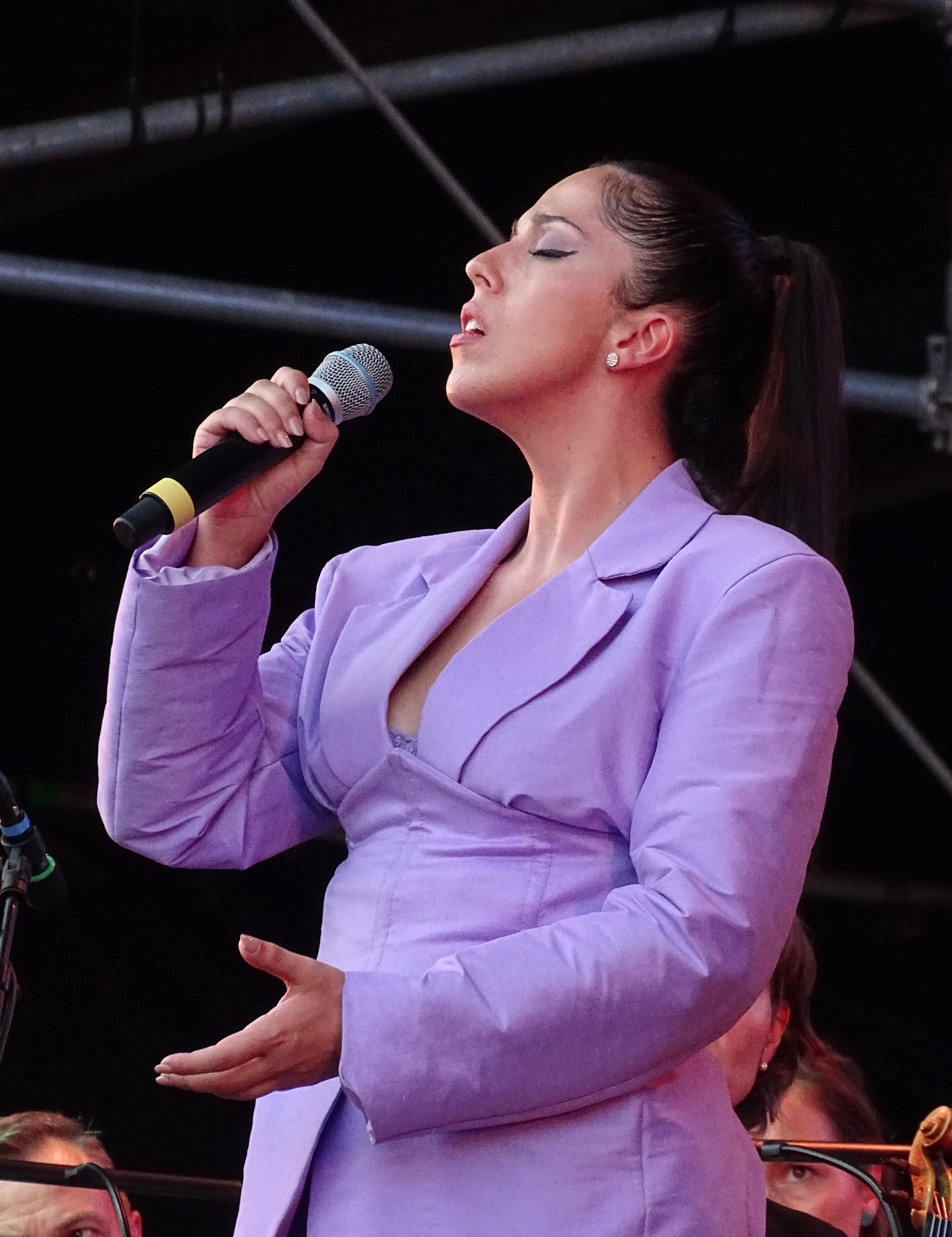
- Correia in 2023

Background information
- Born: 27 May 1993 (age 33)
- Origin: Marvila, Lisbon, Portugal
- Genres: Fado, Pop, World Music, Jazz
- Occupation: Singer
- Instruments: Vocals
- Label: Universal Music Portugal

Sara Sofia Correia (born 27 May 1993) is a Portuguese singer, specializing in the fado genre. She rose to fame in 2007 after winning the Portuguese singing competition, "Grande Noite do Fado" (Great Fado Night), at the age of 13.

== Early life ==
Sara Correia was born in the Marvila district of Lisbon on 27 May 1993. She grew up inspired by her aunt, Joana Correia, who was also a fado singer. Correia also listened to Amália Rodrigues in her youth, inspired by her interpretation of the fado genre. At age 13, she won the competition "Grande Noite do Fado" (Great Fado Night) and has since toured with other prominent fado singers, such as Celeste Rodrigues, and Jorge Fernando.

== Career ==
=== 2018–2019: Sara Correia ===
Correia released her eponymous debut album, Sara Correia, in 2018. The album was produced by Diogo Clemente and was released through Universal Music Portugal. Her debut album charted at number eight in the Portuguese charts after release. Post release of the album, Correia toured in countries such as South Korea, Italy, Chile, and India.

=== 2020–present: Do Coração, The Voice Portugal, and Liberdade ===
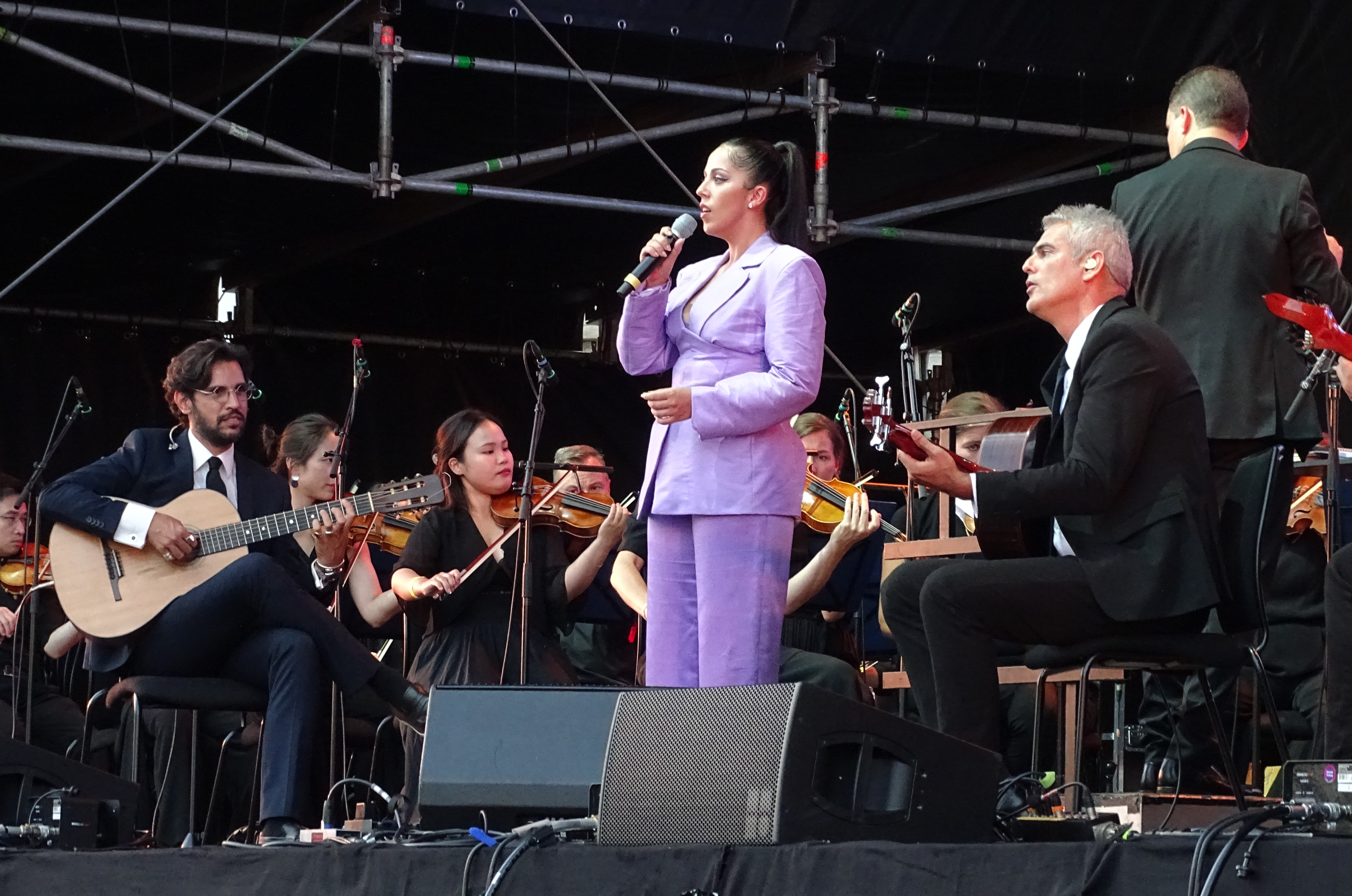
Correia (center) performing with Diogo Clemente (left) and Frederico Gato (right) in 2023

In 2020, Correia released her second album, Do Coração (From the Heart). The album was met with positive reviews and was nominated for a Latin Grammy in the category of "Best Portuguese Speaking Roots Music Album". However, the album lost to Ivete Sangalo's Arraía da Veveta.

In 2023, Correia was announced to be one of the coaches on the second season of The Voice Gerações, alongside Mickael Carreira, Simone de Oliveira, and Anselmo Ralph. The series aired in July 2023. Her final act, Grupo Pioneiros, finished in the Top 5 of the competition.

After appearing on The Voice Gerações, Correia was announced to be a coach on the eleventh season of the main version of the show, The Voice Portugal, with Fernando Daniel, Sónia Tavares, and António Zambujo. The series premiered in September 2023 and concluded in January 2024. Correia coached her final artist, Mafalda Vasques, to the finale where she finished in fourth place. In June 2024, it was announced that Correia would return as a coach for the twelfth season of the show, which premiered in September 2024 and concluded in January 2025, with Daniel, Tavares, and Nininho Vaz Maia. Her final artist, Maria João Duque, made it to the finale where she also received fourth place under Correia's coaching. In July 2025, Correia was announced to return for her third season in the fall of the same year where she again mentored her final artist, Bruno Sendas, to fourth place. In July 2026, it was announced that Correia had departed the show after three seasons as a coach.

On 13 October 2023, Correia released her third album, Liberdade (Freedom).

On 27 February 2026, Correia released Tempestade, her fourth album, which features eleven singles. Preceding the album's release, she released "Respirar" in 2025 with Calema, with whom Correia coached alongside on the thirteenth season of The Voice Portugal. Also in 2025, "Avisem Que Eu Cheguei" was released as the lead single of Tempestade.

== Artistry ==
In an interview with Songlines in 2022, Correia stated "whatever I sing it will always be fado. I believe a fado singer can sing any song with different instruments and can still sound like fado."

== Discography ==
=== Albums ===
List of studio albums, with selected details
| Title | Details |
|---|---|
| Sara Correia | Released: 14 September 2018 (POR); Label: Universal Music Portugal |
| Do Coração | Released: 25 September 2020 (POR); Label: Universal Music Portugal |
| Liberdade | Released: 13 October 2023 (POR); Label: Universal Music Portugal |
| Tempestade | Released: 27 February 2026 (POR); Label: Universal Music Portugal |

=== Singles ===
List of singles, showing year released, and the name of the album
| Title | Year | Album |
|---|---|---|
| "Fado Português" | 2018 | Sara Correia |
| "Quando O Fado Passa" | 2018 | Sara Correia |
| "Sou A Casa" | 2018 | Sara Correia |
| "O Meu Bom Ar" | 2018 | Sara Correia |
| "Agora O Tempo" | 2018 | Sara Correia |
| "Zé Maria" | 2018 | Sara Correia |
| "Hoje" | 2018 | Sara Correia |
| "Lisboa E O Tejo" | 2018 | Sara Correia |
| "Veio A Saudade" | 2018 | Sara Correia |
| "Corrido Dos Botões" | 2018 | Sara Correia |
| "Se O Mundo Dá Tantas Voltas" | 2018 | Sara Correia |
| "Chegou Tão Tarde" | 2020 | Do Coração |
| "Tu Ganhas Sempre" | 2020 | Do Coração |
| "Dizer Não" | 2020 | Do Coração |
| "Solidão" (with António Zambujo) | 2020 | Do Coração |
| "Por Passares" | 2020 | Do Coração |
| "Por Perto" | 2020 | Do Coração |
| "O Pórtico" | 2020 | Do Coração |
| "Os Teus Recados" | 2020 | Do Coração |
| "Porquê Do Fado" | 2020 | Do Coração |
| "Chegou Tão Tarde" | 2020 | Do Coração |
| "Chegou Tão Tarde" | 2020 | Do Coração |
| "Liberdade" | 2023 | Liberdade |
| "Madrugou" | 2023 | Liberdade |
| "Marcha Da Perdição" | 2023 | Liberdade |
| "Era O Adeus" | 2023 | Liberdade |
| "Que Da Voz Te Nasçam Pombas" | 2023 | Liberdade |
| "No Fim, Mentir Por Nós É Amar" | 2023 | Liberdade |
| "Tu Não Me Digas" (with Maria da Nazaré) | 2023 | Liberdade |
| "Roleta" | 2023 | Liberdade |
| "Marias Na Terra" | 2023 | Liberdade |
| "Balada Do Outono" | 2023 | Liberdade |
| "Chelas" | 2023 | Liberdade |
| "Esqueceste-Te De Nós" | 2023 | Liberdade |
| "Ser Rebelde" | 2023 | Liberdade |
| "Respirar" (with Calema) | 2025 | —N/a |
| "Avisem Que Eu Cheguei" | 2025 | Tempestade |
| "As Mãos Do Meu Carinho" | 2026 | Tempestade |
| "Canto" | 2026 | Tempestade |
| "Ódio" | 2026 | Tempestade |
| "Continuo À Tua Espera" | 2026 | Tempestade |
| "Roupa Ao Sol" | 2026 | Tempestade |
| "Nevoeiro" | 2026 | Tempestade |
| "O Marinheiro" | 2026 | Tempestade |
| "Eu Venho" | 2026 | Tempestade |
| "Para Um Outro Amor" | 2026 | Tempestade |
| "Fado Sara" | 2026 | Tempestade |

== Awards ==
| Year | Award | Nominee | Category | Result |
|---|---|---|---|---|
| 2021 | Latin Grammy Awards | Sara Correia | Best Portuguese Language Roots Album | Nominated |
