= Toranja =

Portuguese band

Toranja was a Portuguese rock band formed by Tiago Bettencourt, Ricardo Frutoso, Dodi and Rato. The band's name, "toranja", is the portuguese word for grapefruit.

They released their first album Esquissos in 2003, and followed it with Segundo (meaning "second" in Portuguese) in 2005. The band paused their activities in 2006, for an undetermined time.

At the beginning of her career, the faddist Cuca Roseta was a singer in Toranja, invited by her childhood friend Tiago Bettencourt.

== Members ==
- Tiago Bettencourt: vocals and guitar
- Ricardo Frutoso: guitar
- Dodi: bass
- Rato: drums
