= Raquel Tavares =

Portuguese former Fado singer (born 1985)

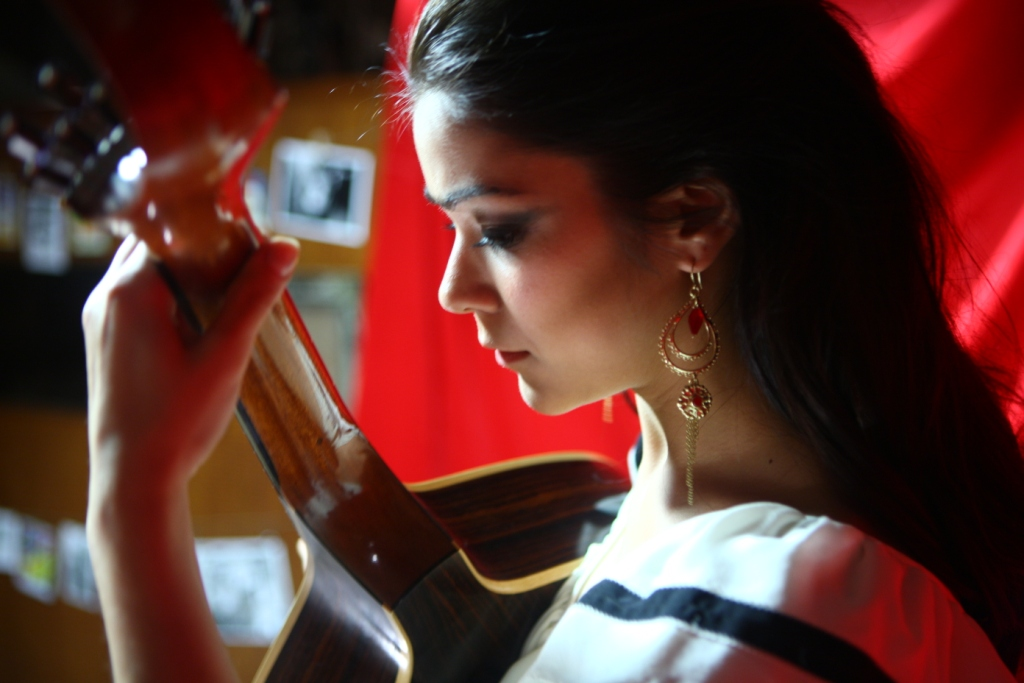
- Raquel Tavares, 2008

Background information
- Born: Raquel Filipa Tavares; 11 January 1985 (age 41)
- Origin: Lisbon (Portugal)
- Genre: Fado
- Years active: 1997–2020

Raquel Filipa Tavares (born January 11, 1985) is a Portuguese Fado singer.

== Career ==
Tavares has won a popular Fado song contest in Portugal, called "Grande Noite do Fado."

Tavares regularly sang at the "Bacalhau de Molho," one of Lisbon's most famous Fado houses. She has performed all over Europe, including Paris, Rome and Madrid.

Her first album was released in 2006, the same year she won the Amália Rodrigues Revelation Prize.

Her second album, Bairro, was released in May 2008.

In January 2020, she took a break from her professional career to pursue a life away from the stage.

== Curiosities ==
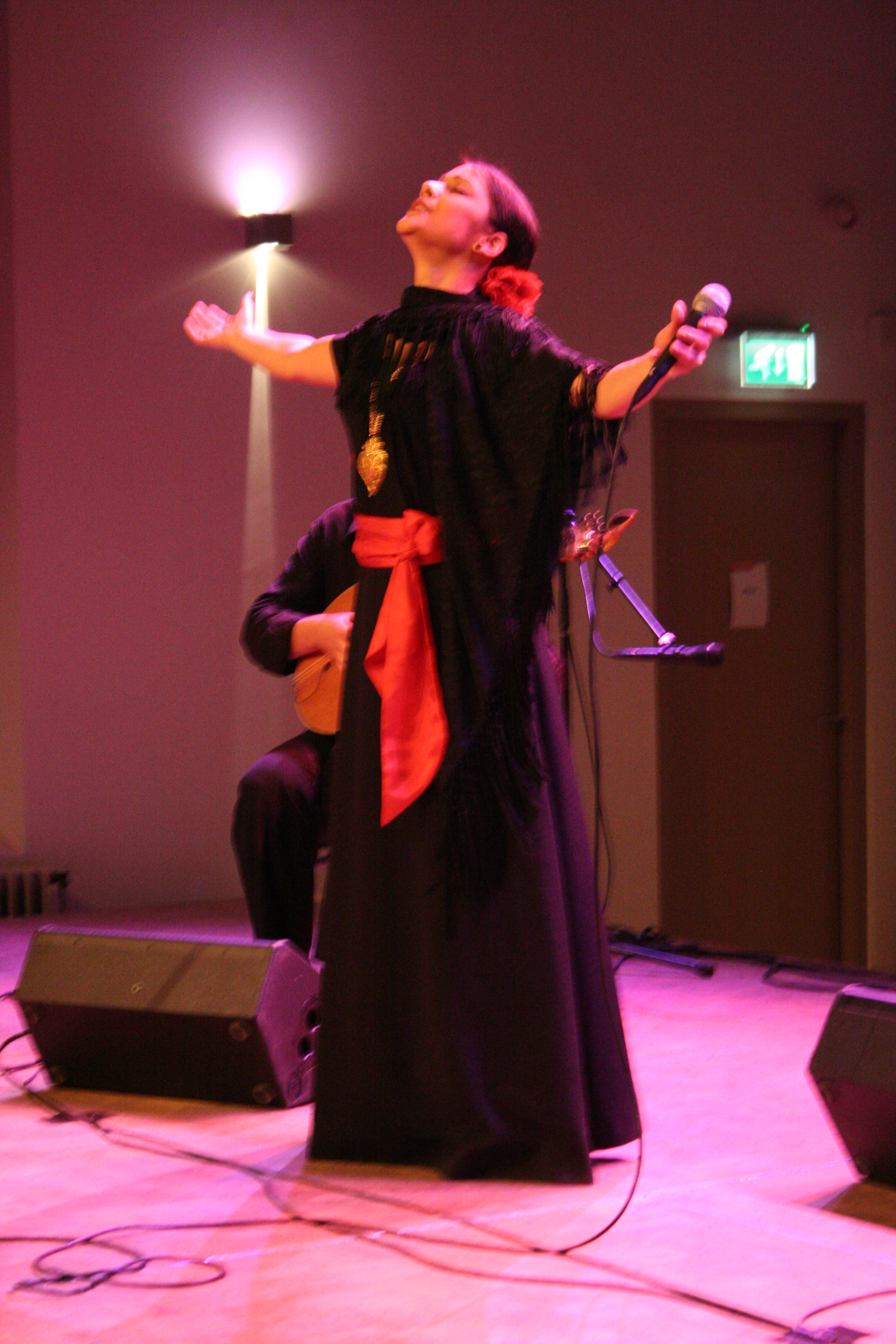
Tavares holding a concert in Utrecht c. 2008

In 2004, Raquel played a small part as a Fado singer in Mário Barroso's film "O Milagre Segundo Salomé" ("The Miracle According to Salomé").

She entered the ⁣Eurovision Dance Contest 2008 with João Tiago, placing 8th.

== Discography ==
=== Albums ===
- 1999: Porque Canto Fado (Metro-Som)
- 2006: Raquel Tavares (Movieplay)
- 2008: Bairro (Movieplay)
- 2016: Raquel (Sony Music)
