= António Zambujo =

Portuguese singer-songwriter (born 1975)

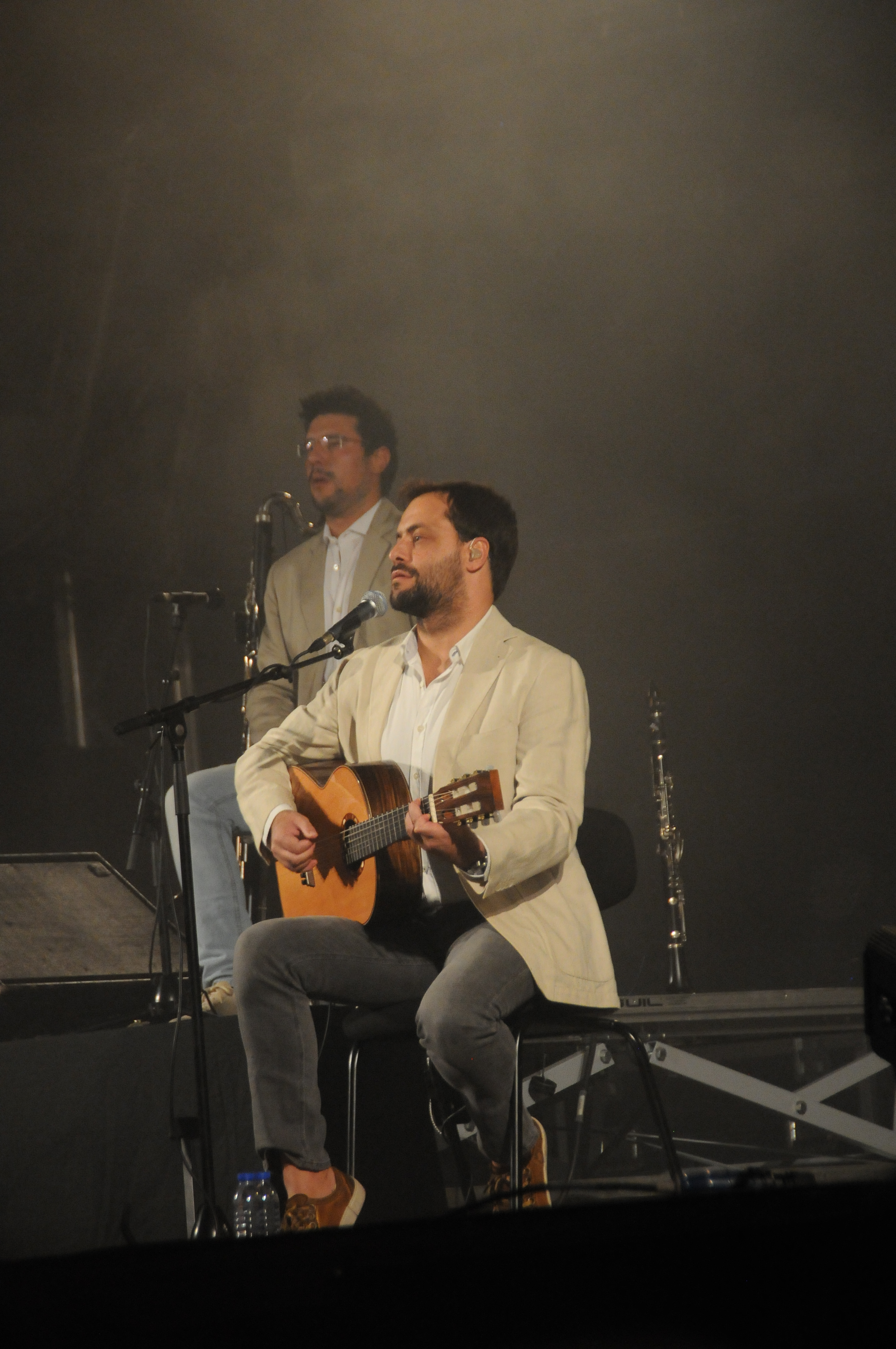
- António Zambujo in Braga, Portugal

Background information
- Born: António José Rodeia Zambujo; September 19, 1975 (age 50)
- Origin: Beja, Portugal
- Genres: Fado, Acoustic music
- Occupation: Musician
- Website: http://www.antoniozambujo.com/

António José Rodeia Zambujo ComIH (born September 1975) is a Portuguese singer and songwriter. One of the characteristic qualities of his music is the presence of Cante Alentejano, a regional genre that influenced him while growing up in Beja. Since 2004, António Zambujo has been performing worldwide. He has won the Amália Rodrigues Foundation prize as best male fado singer.

His album Até Pensei Que Fosse Minha was nominated for the 2017 Latin Grammy Award for Best MPB Album. In 2019, his song "Sem Palavras" was nominated in the same award, this time for the Best Portuguese Language Song category.

== Discography ==
- O mesmo Fado (2002) compilation
- Por meu Cante (2004) CD
- Outro Sentido (2007) CD
- Guia (2010) CD
- Quinto (2012) CD
- Lisboa 22:38 - Ao Vivo no Coliseu (2013) CD
- Rua Da Emenda (2014) CD
- Até Pensei Que Fosse Minha (2016) CD (interpreting songs by Chico Buarque)
- Do Avesso (2018) CD
- Voz e Violão (2021)
- Cidade (2023)
