= PLAY – Portuguese Music Awards =

Annual music awards

- Awarded for: Excellence in music
- Sponsored by: Vodafone
- Venue: Coliseu dos Recreios, Lisbon
- Country: Portugal
- Hosted by: Filomena Cautela; Inês Lopes Gonçalves
- First award: April 9, 2019

Highlights
- Most awards: Dino D'Santiago (8)
- Most nominations: Slow J (12)
- Website: playpremiosdamusicaportuguesa.pt

Television/radio coverage
- Network: RTP
- Produced by: PassMúsica

PLAY - Portuguese Music Awards (pt: PLAY - Prémios da Música Portuguesa) are annual awards for the Portuguese music scene, sponsored by Vodafone.

The first edition took place at Coliseu dos Recreios in Lisbon on 9 April 2019 and was broadcast by RTP, presented by Filomena Cautela and Inês Lopes Gonçalves.

== Editions ==
#	Date	Venue	Presenters	Broadcaster
1	April 9, 2019	Coliseu dos Recreios, Lisbon	Filomena Cautela; Inês Lopes Gonçalves	RTP
2	June 29, 2020	Coliseu dos Recreios, Lisbon	Filomena Cautela; Inês Lopes Gonçalves	RTP
3	July 8, 2021	Coliseu dos Recreios, Lisbon	Filomena Cautela; Inês Lopes Gonçalves	RTP
4	May 5, 2022	Coliseu dos Recreios, Lisbon	Filomena Cautela; Inês Lopes Gonçalves	RTP
5	April 27, 2023	Coliseu dos Recreios, Lisbon	Filomena Cautela; Inês Lopes Gonçalves	RTP
5	May 16, 2024	Coliseu dos Recreios, Lisbon	Filomena Cautela; Inês Lopes Gonçalves	RTP

== Categories ==
=== Active ===
- Vodafone Best Song (2019–)
- Best Female Artist (2020–)
- Best Male Artist (2020–)
- Best Group (2019–)
- Best Album (2019–)
- Best Fado Album (2019–)
- Best Jazz Album (2020–)
- Best Classical/Erudite Music Album (2020–)
- Best Music Video (2019–)
- Revelation of the Year (2019–)
- Lusophony Award (2019–)
- Lusophony Award (2019–)
- Best Popular Music Award (2019–)
- Career Award (2019–)

=== Extinct ===
- Best Solo Artist (2019)
- Best International Artist (2019)
- Best International Song (2019)

== Active categories winners ==
=== Vodafone Best Song ===
This award is voted by the public via internet and phonecalls.

Year	Winner		Nominees	
Year	Song title	Artist(s)	Song title	Artist(s)
2019	"Estradas no Céu"	Valas feat. Raquel Tavares	"Devia Ir"	Wet Bed Gang
2019	"Estradas no Céu"	Valas feat. Raquel Tavares	"Água de Coco"	ProfJam
2019	"Estradas no Céu"	Valas feat. Raquel Tavares	"Faz Gostoso"	Blaya
2020	"Amor, A Nossa Vida"	Capitão Fausto	"Bairro"	Wet Bed Gang
2020	"Amor, A Nossa Vida"	Capitão Fausto	"Bússola"	Nenny
2020	"Amor, A Nossa Vida"	Capitão Fausto	"Também Sonhar"	Slow J feat. Sara Tavares
2021	"Louco"	Piruka feat. Bluay	“Sei lá”	Bárbara Tinoco
2021	"Louco"	Piruka feat. Bluay	“Kriolu”	Dino D'Santiago feat. Julinho KSD
2021	"Louco"	Piruka feat. Bluay	“Assobia Para O Lado”	Carlão
2021	"Louco"	Piruka feat. Bluay	“A Noite”	Stereossauro X Marisa Liz X Carlão
2021	"Louco"	Piruka feat. Bluay	“Tribunal”	ProfJam, benji price
2022	“Onde Vais”	Bárbara Bandeira feat. Carminho	“Andorinhas”	Ana Moura
2022	“Onde Vais”	Bárbara Bandeira feat. Carminho	“Borboletas”	Gama
2022	“Onde Vais”	Bárbara Bandeira feat. Carminho	“Lote B”	António Zambujo
2022	“Onde Vais”	Bárbara Bandeira feat. Carminho	“Love is on my Side”	The Black Mamba
2022	“Onde Vais”	Bárbara Bandeira feat. Carminho	“Tequila”	Nenny
2023	“Lua”	Ivandro	“Agarra em Mim”	Ana Moura feat Pedro Mafama
2023	“Lua”	Ivandro	“A Maior Traição”	Carlão
2023	“Lua”	Ivandro	“Quero é Viver”	Sara Correia
2023	“Lua”	Ivandro	“Saudade, Saudade”	Maro
2023	“Lua”	Ivandro	“Sorriso”	Diogo Piçarra

=== Best Female Artist ===
Year	Winner	Nominees
2020	Lena D’Água	Aldina Duarte; Ana Bacalhau; Blaya
2021	Capicua	Bárbara Tinoco; Carolina Deslandes; Mariza
2022	Ana Moura	Bárbara Tinoco; Gisela João; Nenny
2023	Ana Moura	Aldina Duarte; Maro; Nena

=== Best Male Artist ===
Year	Winner	Nominees
2020	Slow J	Diogo Piçarra; Fernando Daniel; Salvador Sobral
2021	Dino D’Santiago	Carlão; Samuel Úria; Sérgio Godinho
2022	Dino D’Santiago	António Zambujo; Camané; Tony Carreira
2023	Ivandro	Carlão; Mário Laginha; T-Rex

=== Best Group ===
Year	Winner	Nominees
2019	Dead Combo	Wet Bed Gang; Linda Martini; Diabo na Cruz
2020	Capitão Fausto	The Gift; Expensive Soul; Mão Morta
2021	Clã	HMB; Os Quatro e Meia; Wet Bed Gang
2022	The Black Mamba	Moonspell; Os Quatro e Meia; Wet Bed Gang
2023	Calema	Capitão Fausto; Linda Martini; Wet Bed Gang

=== Best Album ===
Year	Winner		Nominees	
Year	Album title	Artist(s)	Album title	Artist(s)
2019	"Mundu Nôbu"	Dino D'Santiago	"Mariza"	Mariza
2019	"Mundu Nôbu"	Dino D'Santiago	"Do avesso"	António Zambujo
2019	"Mundu Nôbu"	Dino D'Santiago	"Odeon Hotel"	Dead Combo
2020	"Aqui Está-se Sossegado"	Camané & Mário Laginha	"#FFFFFF"	Profjam
2020	"Aqui Está-se Sossegado"	Camané & Mário Laginha	"You are forgiven"	Slow J
2020	"Aqui Está-se Sossegado"	Camané & Mário Laginha	"A Invenção do Dia Claro"	Capitão Fausto
2021	"Kriola"	Dino D'Santiago	"Madrepérola"	Capicua
2021	"Kriola"	Dino D'Santiago	"Mais Antigo"	Bispo
2021	"Kriola"	Dino D'Santiago	"Véspera"	Clã
2022	"70 Voltas ao Sol"	Jorge Palma	"Aurora"	Gisela João
2022	"70 Voltas ao Sol"	Jorge Palma	"Badiu"	Dino D'Santiago
2022	"70 Voltas ao Sol"	Jorge Palma	"Recomeçar"	Tony Carreira

=== Best Fado Album ===
Year	Winner		Nominees	
Year	Album title	Artist(s)	Album title	Artist(s)
2019	"Maria"	Carminho	"Sempre"	Katia Guerreiro
2019	"Maria"	Carminho	"Sara"	Sara Correia
2019	"Maria"	Carminho	"Branco"	Cristina Branco
2020	"Aqui Está-se Sossegado"	Camané & Mário Laginha		
2020	"Aqui Está-se Sossegado"	Camané & Mário Laginha	"Roubados"	Aldina Duarte
2020	"Aqui Está-se Sossegado"	Camané & Mário Laginha	"Um Fado ao Contrário"	Pedro Moutinho
2020	"Aqui Está-se Sossegado"	Camané & Mário Laginha	"Puro"	Matilde Cid

=== Best Jazz Album ===
Year	Winner		Nominees	
Year	Album title	Artist(s)	Album title	Artist(s)
2020	TBD	TBD		

=== Best Classical/Erudite Music Album ===
Year	Winner		Nominees	
Year	Album title	Artist(s)	Album title	Artist(s)
2020	TBD	TBD		

=== Best Music Video ===
Year	Winner		Nominees	
Year	Artist	Song title	Artist	Song title
2019	Pedro Abrunhosa	"Amor em tempo de muros"	ProfJam	"Água de Coco"
2019	Pedro Abrunhosa	"Amor em tempo de muros"	Boss AC	"Queque foi"
2019	Pedro Abrunhosa	"Amor em tempo de muros"	Blaya	"Eu avisei"
2020	Branko, Sango, Cosima, ProfJam	"Hear from You"	The Gift	"Verão"
2020	Branko, Sango, Cosima, ProfJam	"Hear from You"	António Zambujo	"Catavento da Sé"
2020	Branko, Sango, Cosima, ProfJam	"Hear from You"	Lena D’Água	"Grande Festa"

=== Revelation of the Year ===
Year	Winner	Nominees
2019	Conan Osíris	Papillon; Sara Correia; (Mozambique) Selma Uamusse
2020	Bárbara Tinoco	Nenny; Murta; Tiago Nacarato

=== Lusophony Award ===
Year	Winner		Nominees	
Year	Artist	Song title	Artist	Song title
2019	(Angola) Matias Damásio	"Nada Mudou"	(Angola) C4 Pedro	"Se Eu Soubesse"
2019	(Angola) Matias Damásio	"Nada Mudou"	(Brazil) Ludmilla	“Din Din Din”
2019	(Angola) Matias Damásio	"Nada Mudou"	(Cape Verde) Nelson Freitas	"Nubian Queen"
2020	(Brazil) Tainá	"Sonhos"	(Brazil) Anitta & Kevinho	"Terremoto"
2020	(Brazil) Tainá	"Sonhos"	(Brazil) Giulia Be	"Menina Solta"
2020	(Brazil) Tainá	"Sonhos"	(Brazil) Silva e Ludmilla	"Um Pôr do Sol na Praia"
2021	(Brazil) Emicida part. Gilberto Gil	“É Tudo pra ontem”	(Brazil) MC Kevinho	“Te gusta”
2021	(Brazil) Emicida part. Gilberto Gil	“É Tudo pra ontem”	(Brazil) Giulia Be, Luan Santana	“Inesquecível”
2021	(Brazil) Emicida part. Gilberto Gil	“É Tudo pra ontem”	(Angola) Esperança (Paulo Flores & Prodígio)	“Nzambi”
2022	(Angola) Paulo Flores	“Jeito Alegre de Chorar”	(Cape Verde) Mario Lucio	“Hino à Gratidão”
2022	(Angola) Paulo Flores	“Jeito Alegre de Chorar”	(Brazil) Luísa Sonza, Anitta & Pabllo Vittar	“Modo Turbo”
2022	(Angola) Paulo Flores	“Jeito Alegre de Chorar”	(Angola) C4 Pedro	“Nossas Coisas”
2023	(Brazil) Pedro Sampaio & MC Pedrinho	“Dançarina”	(Brazil) Anitta & Pedro Sampaio	“No Chão Novinha”
2023	(Brazil) Pedro Sampaio & MC Pedrinho	“Dançarina”	(Angola) Matias Damásio	“Como Antes”
2023	(Brazil) Pedro Sampaio & MC Pedrinho	“Dançarina”	(Cape Verde) Batida & Mayra Andrade	“Bom Bom”

=== Critics Award ===
Year	Winner
2019	Dino d'Santiago
2020	Lena D'Água
2021	Dino d'Santiago
2022	Dino d'Santiago
2023	Ana Moura

=== Career Award ===
Year	Winner
2019	Carlos do Carmo
2020	Xutos & Pontapés
2022	Simone de Oliveira
2023	Sérgio Godinho
2024	António Victorino de Almeida
2025	José Cid

== Extinct categories winners ==
=== Best Solo Artist ===
Year	Winner	Nominees
2019	Dino d'Santiago	Diogo Piçarra; Blaya; António Zambujo

=== Best International Artist ===
Year	Winner	Nominees
2019	(United States) Kendrick Lamar	(United States) Ariana Grande; (Canada) Drake; (United States) Cardi B

=== Best International Song ===
Year	Winner (Song title)	Nominees (Song title)
2019	(United States) Kendrick Lamar - "All The Stars"	(Canada) Drake - "God's Plan"; (United States) Ariana Grande - "No Tears Left To Cry"; (Canada) Shawn Mendes - "In My Blood"
