= List of number-one albums of 2018 (Portugal) =

The Portuguese Albums Chart ranks the best-performing albums in Portugal, as compiled by the Associação Fonográfica Portuguesa.

Number-one albums in Portugal
← 2017 • 2018 • 2019 →

| Week | Album | Artist | Reference |
|---|---|---|---|
| 1/2018 | Roberto Carlos por Raquel Tavares | Raquel Tavares | |
| 2/2018 | Roberto Carlos por Raquel Tavares | Raquel Tavares | |
| 3/2018 | Camila | Camila Cabello | |
| 4/2018 | Roberto Carlos por Raquel Tavares | Raquel Tavares | |
| 5/2018 | Nação Valente | Sérgio Godinho | |
| 6/2018 | Teu | Paulo Sousa | |
| 7/2018 | Nação Valente | Sérgio Godinho | |
| 8/2018 | Linda Martini | Linda Martini | |
| 9/2018 | Roberto Carlos por Raquel Tavares | Raquel Tavares | |
| 10/2018 | Roberto Carlos por Raquel Tavares | Raquel Tavares | |
| 11/2018 | Roberto Carlos por Raquel Tavares | Raquel Tavares | |
| 12/2018 | Salto | Fernando Daniel | |
| 13/2018 | Salto | Fernando Daniel | |
| 14/2018 | Roberto Carlos por Raquel Tavares | Raquel Tavares | |
| 15/2018 | Madeira | PAUS | |
| 16/2018 | Odeon Hotel | Dead Combo | |
| 17/2018 | Casa | Carolina Deslandes | |
| 18/2018 | Casa | Carolina Deslandes | |
| 19/2018 | Confessions | Aurea | |
| 20/2018 | Tranquility Base Hotel & Casino | Arctic Monkeys | |
| 21/2018 | Casa | Carolina Deslandes | |
| 22/2018 | Mariza | Mariza | |
| 23/2018 | Mariza | Mariza | |
| 24/2018 | 28 Noites Ao Vivo nos Coliseus | António Zambujo & Miguel Araújo | |
| 25/2018 | 28 Noites Ao Vivo nos Coliseus | António Zambujo & Miguel Araújo | |
| 26/2018 | 28 Noites Ao Vivo nos Coliseus | António Zambujo & Miguel Araújo | |
| 27/2018 | 28 Noites Ao Vivo nos Coliseus | António Zambujo & Miguel Araújo | |
| 28/2018 | 28 Noites Ao Vivo nos Coliseus | António Zambujo & Miguel Araújo | |
| 29/2018 | 28 Noites Ao Vivo nos Coliseus | António Zambujo & Miguel Araújo | |
| 30/2018 | 28 Noites Ao Vivo nos Coliseus | António Zambujo & Miguel Araújo | |
| 31/2018 | Cartas | Bárbara Bandeira | |
| 32/2018 | Mariza | Mariza | |
| 33/2018 | Mariza | Mariza | |
| 34/2018 | Sweetener | Ariana Grande | |
| 35/2018 | Mariza | Mariza | |
| 36/2018 | Mariza | Mariza | |
| 37/2018 | Mariza | Mariza | |
| 38/2018 | Love Is Here to Stay | Tony Bennett and Diana Krall | |
| 39/2018 | Love Is Here to Stay | Tony Bennett and Diana Krall | |
| 40/2018 | Mariza | Mariza | |
| 41/2018 | Trench | Twenty One Pilots | |
| 42/2018 | Lebre | Diabo na Cruz | |
| 43/2018 | Mundu Nôbu | Dino d'Santiago | |
| 44/2018 | Augusta | Matias Damásio | |
| 45/2018 | As Canções das Nossas Vidas | Tony Carreira | |
| 46/2018 | As Canções das Nossas Vidas | Tony Carreira | |
| 47/2018 | As Canções das Nossas Vidas | Tony Carreira | |
| 48/2018 | 7 | David Carreira | |
| 49/2018 | Espiritual | Pedro Abrunhosa and Comité Caviar | |
| 50/2018 | Espiritual | Pedro Abrunhosa and Comité Caviar | |
| 51/2018 | Espiritual | Pedro Abrunhosa and Comité Caviar | |
| 52/2018 | Do Avesso | António Zambujo | |

== See also ==
- List of number-one singles of 2018 (Portugal)
