= List of number-one albums of 2020 (Portugal) =

The Portuguese Albums Chart ranks the best-performing albums in Portugal, as compiled by the Associação Fonográfica Portuguesa.

Number-one albums in Portugal
← 2019 • 2020 • 2021 →

Week	Album	Artist	Reference
1/2020	40 Anos a Dar no Duro	Xutos & Pontapés	
2/2020	40 Anos a Dar no Duro	Xutos & Pontapés	
3/2020	Rare	Selena Gomez	
4/2020	Aqui Está-se Sossegado	Camané and Mário Laginha	
5/2020	Honey	Noble	
6/2020	Walls	Louis Tomlinson	
7/2020	Yellow	Calema	
8/2020	The Slow Rush	Tame Impala	
9/2020	O Método	Rodrigo Leão	
10/2020	O Método	Rodrigo Leão	
11/2020	Map of the Soul: 7	BTS	
12/2020	Mais Antigo	Bispo	
13/2020	Mais Antigo	Bispo	
14/2020	Gigaton	Pearl Jam	
15/2020	Gigaton	Pearl Jam	
16/2020	Gigaton	Pearl Jam	
17/2020	Gigaton	Pearl Jam	
18/2020	Map of the Soul: 7	BTS	
19/2020	Map of the Soul: 7	BTS	
20/2020	Map of the Soul: 7	BTS	
21/2020	Map of the Soul: 7	BTS	
22/2020	Véspera	Clã	
23/2020	Chromatica	Lady Gaga	
24/2020	Zeca	Pedro Jóia	
25/2020	Zeca	Pedro Jóia	
26/2020	Rough and Rowdy Ways	Bob Dylan	
27/2020	Rough and Rowdy Ways	Bob Dylan	
28/2020	Map of the Soul: 7	BTS	
29/2020	Presente	Fernando Daniel	
30/2020	Presente	Fernando Daniel	
31/2020	Amália em Paris	Amália Rodrigues	
32/2020	Presente	Fernando Daniel	
33/2020	Map of the Soul: 7 – The Journey	BTS	
34/2020	Presente	Fernando Daniel	
35/2020	Fine Line	Harry Styles	
36/2020	S&M2	Metallica and the San Francisco Symphony	
37/2020	S&M2	Metallica and the San Francisco Symphony	
38/2020	We Are Chaos	Marilyn Manson	
39/2020	Canções do Pós-Guerra	Samuel Úria	
40/2020	O Tempo Vai Esperar	Os Quatro e Meia	
41/2020	Roger Waters: Us + Them	Roger Waters	
42/2020	Na Quinta	Panda e os Caricas	
43/2020	Serpentine Prison	Matt Berninger	
44/2020	Letter to You	Bruce Springsteen	
45/2020	Letter to You	Bruce Springsteen	
46/2020	Letter to You	Bruce Springsteen	
47/2020	Power Up	AC/DC	
48/2020	Be	BTS	
49/2020	Mariza Canta Amália	Mariza	
50/2020	Mariza Canta Amália	Mariza	
51/2020	Mariza Canta Amália	Mariza	
52/2020	Mariza Canta Amália	Mariza	
53/2020	Evermore	Taylor Swift	

== See also ==
- List of number-one singles of 2020 (Portugal)
