= List of number-one Billboard Regional Mexican Songs of 2015 =

The Billboard Regional Mexican Songs is a subchart of the Latin Airplay chart that ranks the best-performing songs on Regional Mexican radio stations in the United States. Published weekly by Billboard magazine, it ranks the "most popular regional Mexican songs, ranked by radio airplay audience impressions as measured by Nielsen Music".

== Chart history ==
Issue date	Song	Artist(s)	Ref.
January 3	"Eres Una Nina"	Gerardo Ortíz	
January 10	"Levantando Polvadera"	Voz de Mando	
January 17	"Eres Una Nina"	Gerardo Ortiz	
January 24	"Eres Una Nina"	Gerardo Ortiz	
January 31	"Eres Una Nina"	Gerardo Ortiz	
February 7	"Eres Una Nina"	Gerardo Ortiz	
February 14	"Levantando Polvadera"	Voz de Mando	
February 21	"Levantando Polvadera"	Voz de Mando	
February 28	"Levantando Polvadera"	Voz de Mando	
March 7	"Levantando Polvadera"	Voz de Mando	
March 14	"Levantando Polvadera"	Voz de Mando	
March 21	"Contigo"	Calibre 50	
March 28	"Contigo"	Calibre 50	
April 4	"Contigo"	Calibre 50	
April 11	"Contigo"	Calibre 50	
April 18	"Contigo"	Calibre 50	
April 25	"Contigo"	Calibre 50	
May 2	"Contigo"	Calibre 50	
May 9	"Contigo"	Calibre 50	
May 16	"Contigo"	Calibre 50	
May 23	"Contigo"	Calibre 50	
May 30	"El Amor de Su Vida"	Julion Alvarez y Su Norteño Banda	
June 6	"El Amor de Su Vida"	Julion Alvarez y Su Norteño Banda	
June 13	"El Amor de Su Vida"	Julion Alvarez y Su Norteño Banda	
June 20	"El Amor de Su Vida"	Julion Alvarez y Su Norteño Banda	
June 27	"El Amor de Su Vida"	Julion Alvarez y Su Norteño Banda	
July 4	"Malditas Ganas"	El Komander	
July 11	"El Amor de Su Vida"	Julion Alvarez y Su Norteño Banda	
July 18	"El Amor de Su Vida"	Julion Alvarez y Su Norteño Banda	
July 25	"Mi Vicio Mas Grande"	Banda El Recodo de Cruz Lizarraga	
August 1	"Mi Vicio Mas Grande"	Banda El Recodo de Cruz Lizarraga	
August 8	"Te Metiste"	Ariel Camacho y Los Plebes del Rancho	
August 15	"Te Metiste"	Ariel Camacho y Los Plebes del Rancho	
August 22	"Aunque Ahora Estes Con El"	Calibre 50	
August 29	"Aunque Ahora Estes Con El"	Calibre 50	
September 5	"Aunque Ahora Estes Con El"	Calibre 50	
September 12	"Aunque Ahora Estes Con El"	Calibre 50	
September 19	"Cual Adios"	Banda Clave Nueva de Max Peraza	
September 26	"Cual Adios"	Banda Clave Nueva de Max Peraza	
October 3	"Piensalo"	Banda Sinaloense MS de Sergio Lizarraga	
October 10	"Piensalo"	Banda Sinaloense MS de Sergio Lizarraga	
October 17	"Piensalo"	Banda Sinaloense MS de Sergio Lizarraga	
October 24	"Cual Adios"	Banda Clave Nueva de Max Peraza	
October 31	"Cual Adios"	Banda Clave Nueva de Max Peraza	
November 7	"Cual Adios"	Banda Clave Nueva de Max Peraza	
November 14	"Cual Adios"	Banda Clave Nueva de Max Peraza	
November 21	"Despues de Ti Quien"	La Adictiva Banda San Jose de Mesillas	
November 28	"Despues de Ti Quien"	La Adictiva Banda San Jose de Mesillas	
December 5	"Despues de Ti Quien"	La Adictiva Banda San Jose de Mesillas	
December 12	"Te Cambio El Domicilio"	Banda Carnaval	
December 19	"Te Cambio El Domicilio"	Banda Carnaval	
December 26	"Despues de Ti Quien"	La Addictiva Banda San Jose de Mesillas	
