= List of number-one albums of 2017 (Portugal) =

The Portuguese Albums Chart ranks the best-performing albums in Portugal, as compiled by the Associação Fonográfica Portuguesa.

Number-one albums in Portugal
← 2016 • 2017 • 2018 →

Week	Album	Artist	Reference
1/2017	Moura	Ana Moura	
2/2017	Carminho canta Tom Jobim	Carminho	
3/2017	I See You	The xx	
4/2017	I See You	The xx	
5/2017	I See You	The xx	
6/2017	Carminho canta Tom Jobim	Carminho	
7/2017	Sempre Mais	Tony Carreira	
8/2017	Bowie 70	David Fonseca	
9/2017	Sempre Mais	Tony Carreira	
10/2017	÷	Ed Sheeran	
11/2017	Sempre Mais	Tony Carreira	
12/2017	Spirit	Depeche Mode	
13/2017	Diz-me	Paulo Gonzo	
14/2017	do=s	Diogo Piçarra	
15/2017	Altar	The Gift	
16/2017	Sempre Mais	Tony Carreira	
17/2017	Altar	The Gift	
18/2017	Altar	The Gift	
19/2017	Turn Up the Quiet	Diana Krall	
20/2017	Excuse Me	Salvador Sobral	
21/2017	Excuse Me	Salvador Sobral	
22/2017	Excuse Me	Salvador Sobral	
23/2017	Excuse Me	Salvador Sobral	
24/2017	Excuse Me	Salvador Sobral	
25/2017	Excuse Me	Salvador Sobral	
26/2017	Excuse Me	Salvador Sobral	
27/2017	Pontos nos Is	Os Quatro e Meia	
28/2017	Duetos	Paulo de Carvalho	
29/2017	Excuse Me	Salvador Sobral	
30/2017	Lust for Life	Lana Del Rey	
31/2017	Everything Now	Arcade Fire	
32/2017	Sempre Mais	Tony Carreira	
33/2017	Sempre Mais	Tony Carreira	
34/2017	Moura	Ana Moura	
35/2017	Villains	Queens of the Stone Age	
36/2017	American Dream	LCD Soundsystem	
37/2017	Sleep Well Beast	The National	
38/2017	Orelha Negra	Orelha Negra	
39/2017	Orelha Negra	Orelha Negra	
40/2017	A Procura	Tiago Bettencourt	
41/2017	Camané Canta Marceneiro	Camané	
42/2017	Camané Canta Marceneiro	Camané	
43/2017	Camané Canta Marceneiro	Camané	
44/2017	Longe	Anjos	
45/2017	As Canções da Maria – Especial História de Portugal	Maria Vasconcelos	
46/2017	Reputation	Taylor Swift	
47/2017	As Canções da Maria – Especial História de Portugal	Maria Vasconcelos	
48/2017	Roberto Carlos por Raquel Tavares	Raquel Tavares	
49/2017	Songs of Experience	U2	
50/2017	Roberto Carlos por Raquel Tavares	Raquel Tavares	
51/2017	Roberto Carlos por Raquel Tavares	Raquel Tavares	
52/2017	Roberto Carlos por Raquel Tavares	Raquel Tavares	

== See also ==
- List of number-one singles of 2017 (Portugal)
