= Nenny =

Portuguese singer-songwriter and rapper

- Born: Marlene Fernanda Cardoso Tavares; 19 November 2002 (age 23); Vialonga, Vila Franca de Xira, Portugal
- Genres: Hip hop tuga, Afro, R&B
- Occupation: Singer-songwriter
- Instrument: Voice
- Years active: 2019—present
- Label: i.M

Marlene Fernanda Cardoso Tavares (born 19 November 2002), known by her stage name Nenny, is a Portuguese singer-songwriter and rapper.

== Early life ==
She was born in Vialonga, Portugal to Cape verdean parents.

At 9 years old she started writing her own songs.

At 11 she went to live in Creil, France and later on Drancy where she lived with her mother, which later on she would write a song about. In September 2019 she moved to Luxembourg with her mother searching for better life conditions.

== Career ==
She started taking her music career more seriously in 2018, after receiving positive feedback for her covers posted on her Instagram account. After a successful cover of "Devia Ir" from Wet Bed Gang, the Portuguese hip-hop group decided to help Nenny grow in the music industry and got her a chance to record her work in a studio. The group are also from Vialonga and saw this as an opportunity to share some local talent. With their help, Nenny released two times Platinum single "Sushi".

In 2021 she performed at COLORS, presenting her new songs, "Tequila", in A COLORS SHOW, and "Wave", in A COLORS ENCORE.

On 3 July 2021, she performed in Sumol Summer Fest in Ericeira, Portugal.

== Discography ==
=== Extended plays (EP's) ===
Title	Details
Aura	Released: 1 March 2020 (POR); Label: i.M; Format: Digital

=== Singles ===
==== As lead artist ====
List of singles, with selected details and chart positions
Title	Year	Peak chart positions	Certifications	Album
Title	Year	POR	Certifications	Album
"Sushi"	2019	84	AFP: 2× Platinum	Aura
"On You"	2019	160		Aura
"Bússola"	2019	17	AFP: 2× Platinum	Aura
"21"	2019	—		Aura
"Dona Maria"	2019	—		Aura
"+351 (Call Me)"	2020	64		Aura
"Tequila"	2021	30		Non-album single(s)
"Wave"	2021	128		Non-album single(s)
"—" denotes a recording that did not chart or was not released in that territory.

== Awards ==
Year	Award	Nominee	Category	Result
2020	PLAY - Portuguese Music Awards	"Bússola"	Vodafone Best Song	Nominated
2020	PLAY - Portuguese Music Awards	Nenny	Revelation of the Year	Nominated
2021	Golden Globes (Portugal)	Nenny	Best Newcomer	Nominated
2021	MTV Europe Music Awards	Nenny	Best Portuguese Act	Nominated
