= List of number-one albums of 2019 (Portugal) =

The Portuguese Albums Chart ranks the best-performing albums in Portugal, as compiled by the Associação Fonográfica Portuguesa.

Number-one albums in Portugal
← 2018 • 2019 • 2020 →

Week	Album	Artist	Reference
1/2019	As Canções das Nossas Vidas	Tony Carreira	
2/2019	Do Avesso	António Zambujo	
3/2019	The Platinum Collection	Queen	
4/2019	The Platinum Collection	Queen	
5/2019	Duro	Xutos & Pontapés	
6/2019	Duro	Xutos & Pontapés	
7/2019	Duro	Xutos & Pontapés	
8/2019	A Star Is Born	Lady Gaga and Bradley Cooper	
9/2019	A Star Is Born	Lady Gaga and Bradley Cooper	
10/2019	A Star Is Born	Lady Gaga and Bradley Cooper	
11/2019	#FFFFFF	ProfJam	
12/2019	A Invenção do Dia Claro	Capitão Fausto	
13/2019	Canções de Roda	Ana Bacalhau, Jorge Benvinda, Sérgio Godinho and Vitorino	
14/2019	Paris, Lisboa	Salvador Sobral	
15/2019	When We All Fall Asleep, Where Do We Go?	Billie Eilish	
16/2019	José Afonso Ao Vivo	José Afonso	
17/2019	José Afonso Ao Vivo	José Afonso	
18/2019	José Afonso Ao Vivo	José Afonso	
19/2019	Paris, Lisboa	Salvador Sobral	
20/2019	Marco Paulo	Marco Paulo	
21/2019	Rammstein	Rammstein	
22/2019	Rammstein	Rammstein	
23/2019	÷	Ed Sheeran	
24/2019	÷	Ed Sheeran	
25/2019	Madame X	Madonna	
26/2019	Madame X	Madonna	
27/2019	Madame X	Madonna	
28/2019	Western Stars	Bruce Springsteen	
29/2019	No.6 Collaborations Project	Ed Sheeran	
30/2019	No.6 Collaborations Project	Ed Sheeran	
31/2019	Era uma vez... Panda e Os Caricas	Panda e os Caricas	
32/2019	Era uma vez... Panda e Os Caricas	Panda e os Caricas	
33/2019	We Are Not Your Kind	Slipknot	
34/2019	Mariza	Mariza	
35/2019	Lover	Taylor Swift	
36/2019	Fear Inoculum	Tool	
37/2019	Norman Fucking Rockwell!	Lana Del Rey	
38/2019	Solo	Bernardo Sassetti	
39/2019	O Melhor de António Variações	António Variações	
40/2019	Abbey Road	The Beatles	
41/2019	7	David Carreira	
42/2019	Abbey Road	The Beatles	
43/2019	Confidências (de Um Homem Vulgar)	João Pedro Pais	
44/2019	Cry	Cigarettes After Sex	
45/2019	Roubados	Aldina Duarte	
46/2019	Ghosteen	Nick Cave & the Bad Seeds	
47/2019	40 Anos a Dar no Duro	Xutos & Pontapés	
48/2019	Thanks for the Dance	Leonard Cohen	
49/2019	South Side Boy	Diogo Piçarra	
50/2019	40 Anos a Dar no Duro	Xutos & Pontapés	
51/2019	Fine Line	Harry Styles	
52/2019	Thanks for the Dance	Leonard Cohen	

== See also ==
- List of number-one singles of 2019 (Portugal)
