= La Factoría (bar) =

Bar in Old San Juan, Puerto Rico

La Factoría is a bar located in Old San Juan, Puerto Rico, established in 2013 by Leslie Cofresí, Roberto Berdecía, and Pablo Rodríguez. The bar features a network of seven interconnected spaces offering craft cocktails, tapas, and a variety of music and atmospheres.

== Description ==
La Factoría is a bar located at the intersection of Calle San Sebastián and Calle San José in Old San Juan, Puerto Rico. The venue is unmarked and appears inconspicuous during the day. It features a series of interconnected spaces with different themes, decor, and atmospheres. The interior includes rustic walls, vintage records, bicycles as decorations, string lights, and open windows facing the cobblestone streets.

La Factoría contains seven distinct areas, each offering a combination of music and beverages. Some sections are designed for intimate gatherings, while others include larger rooms with dance floors. It has a smaller wine-focused bar and speakeasy accessible through a concealed orange door.

=== Menu ===
La Factoría offers a cocktail menu emphasizing house-made ingredients and reinterpretations of traditional drinks. Examples include the Lavender mule, which incorporates homemade ginger beer and lavender syrup, and the Spiced old fashioned, which uses aged rum and spiced bitters. Additional offerings include El Peligroso, prepared with citrus, Campari, and Barrilito rum.

The bar also provides a selection of tapas curated by chef Franco Busó, such as pizzettas, sliders, and tacos. A wine-based cocktail menu is available in one of the venue's specialized bars.

== History ==
La Factoría was founded in 2013 by Leslie Cofresí, Roberto Berdecía, and Pablo Rodríguez. The bar occupies the location of a former establishment, Hijos del Borinquen, which was part of the local nightlife during the 1980s and 1990s. Cofresí and Berdecía, both bartenders, selected the site for its historical significance and potential as a venue for cocktails and nightlife.

The bar's concept included cocktails and an adaptable interior that allowed for different experiences in its various sections. La Factoría gained international recognition after its inclusion on the World’s 50 Best Bars list in 2014, shortly after being named a "Bar to Watch." Over the years, the venue expanded to include additional spaces within the original location.

The bar received further attention in 2017 when it appeared in the music video for "Despacito" by Luis Fonsi and Daddy Yankee, filmed partially within the establishment.

== Reception ==
La Factoría has been included on the World’s 50 Best Bars list multiple times, ranking 32nd in 2019. The bar has been recognized for its combination of cocktails, ambiance, and representation of Puerto Rican culture. It attracts both local patrons and international visitors.

La Factoría has influenced the cocktail industry through Licorería Miramar, a supply business established by Cofresí to provide ingredients and materials to other bars.
