= Karyna Gomes =

Bissau-Guinean singer and journalist

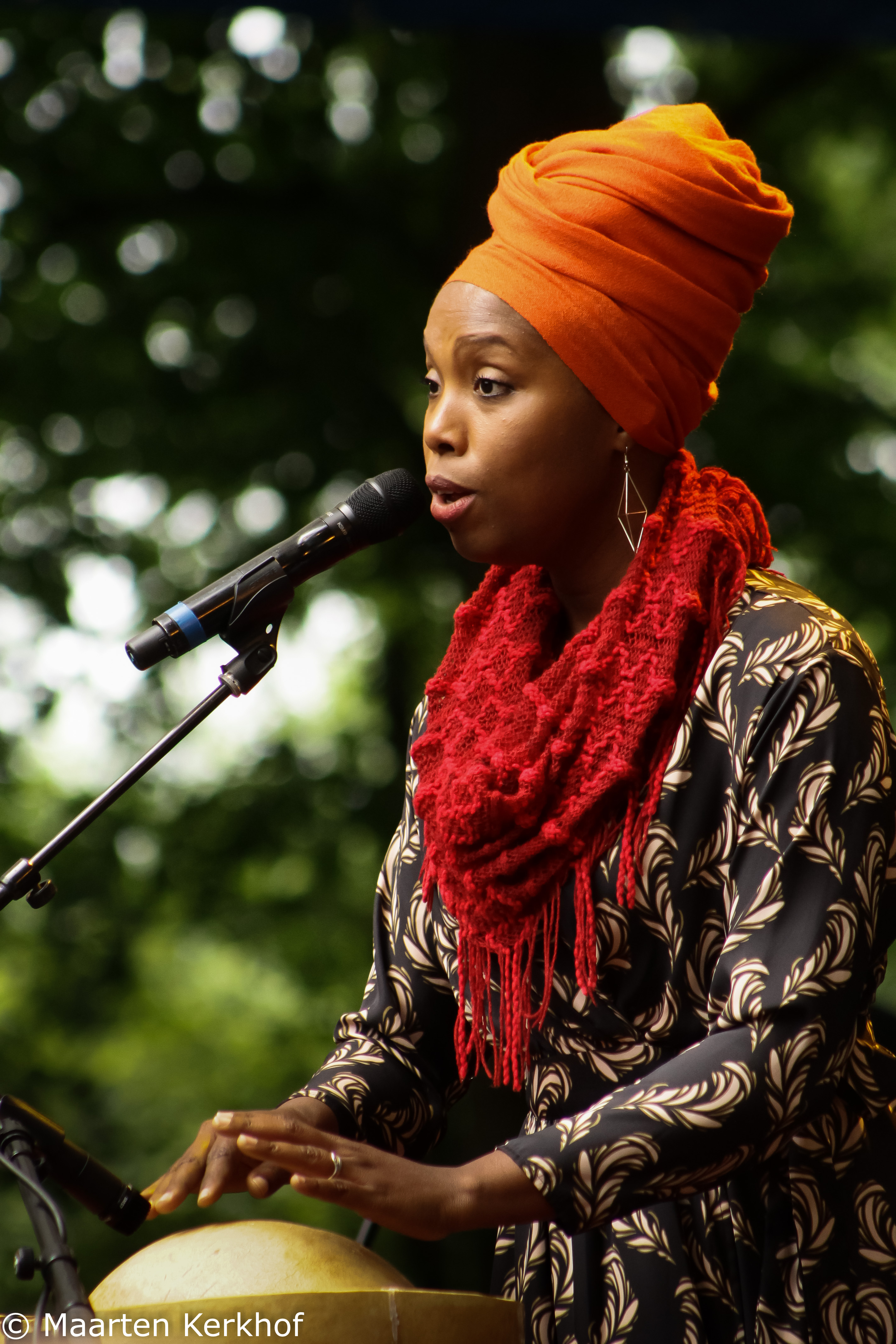
- Born: 13 February 1976 (age 50); Bissau, Guinea-Bissau
- Occupations: journalist; singer; model
- Years active: 1997–present

Karyna Gomes (born 13 February 1976) is a Bissau-Guinean singer and journalist of Cape-Verdean descent. She was the co-founder of the peace movement Miguilan or Minjderis di Guiné No Lanta (English: Women of Guinea-Bissau, Let's rise up). In 2021, she led the coordination of the first journalism projects in various types of Creole languages (in particular Cape Verdean and Guinean), which was developed with the help of the Portuguese online journal Mensagem de Lisboa. As a journalist, she has worked with organizations such as the Associated Press and RTP. She has released two musical albums since the start of her music career in the late 1990s.

== Early life ==
Born in Bissau on 13 February 1976, the daughter of Bissau-Guinean father and a Cape-Verdean mother, Gomes began her musical career in 1997 with the Brazilian gospel choir Rejoicing Mass in São Paulo. While in São Paulo, she studied journalism.

== Career in journalism and activism ==
In 2001, she returned to Guinea-Bissau, where she worked as a journalist for the country's branch of RTP, and also worked in the area of communication for development.

In 2015, going against the then president of Guinea-Bissau, José Mário Vaz, due to dismissal from the elected government, Gomes cofounded Miguilan or Minjderis di Guiné No Lanta (English: Women of Guinea-Bissau, Let's rise up), a civil society organization made up exclusively by women. Their work focuses on issues of peace, stability and legal issues in Guinea-Bissau, bringing to the national debate messages of good governance, democracy, human and women's rights. The organization also denounces currently established decisions and practices in the country that are an affront to democracy and the rule of law.

In 2021, she led the coordination of the first journalism projects in various types of Creole languages (in particular Cape Verdean and Guinean), which was developed with the help of the Portuguese online news organization Mensagem de Lisboa. The online project has been created in partnership with the website Lisboa Criola, ran by Dino D'Santiago. This project was one of 12 projects selected by the New Spectrum Fellowships program to receive a grant.

Gomes has worked with news organizations such as RTP, various local radio stations in Guinea-Bissau, A Semana in Cape Verde, and the Associated Press.

== Artistic career ==
Gomes restarted her musical career in 2005, where she had joined the Orquestra Super Mama Djombo. In Portugal, she launched her first album, titled Mindjer. She then moved to Portugal in 2011, where she released her first track Mindjer. After the launching of her disc, she had made various international incursions, among them the Atlantic Music Expo in 2015 and the Mercado de Visa for Music.

In 2015, she participated in the MED festival in Loulé, and later participated in the Festival Músicas do Mundo in Sines in 2016. In 2015 as well, she became a godmother to the Observatório Nacional dos Direitos da Criança, where she sang in the middle of Bissau in a free event to signal the International Day Against Child Labour. On 22 November 2018, she gave a concert at the Institut Français in Abidjan, the proceeds of which were sent to the Npili project from the Atena Foundation, with the objective of financing the construction of a school building for Bissau-Guinean girls.

In 2018 as well, she participated in the Festas do Mar, promoted by the Municipal Council of Cascais. In 2021, she launched her second album, N'Na, which was presented in festivales such as the Marés de Agosto, Avante! Festival, and at the Cultural Center of Malaposta, during the cycle of the Sons de África no Feminino.

In 2019, Gomes was one of the opening stars for the Over the Border music festival in Bonn, Germany.

The head of a gourd, often called a tina, is one of the main instruments of Gomes, a traditional instrument that came to being among women during the 17th century in the cities of modern-day Guinea-Bissau.

== Recognition and awards ==
- In 2014, she received the Highlight Interpretation Award from the government of Guinea-Bissau, during the first Guineendadi Gala.
- In 2019, she won the award for best PALOP Female Artist during the 2019 African Entertainment Awards USA in Newark, New Jersey, USA.
