= List of number-one singles of 2018 (Portugal) =

The Portuguese Singles Chart ranks the best-performing singles in Portugal, as compiled by the Associação Fonográfica Portuguesa.

Number-one singles of 2018 in Portugal
Week	Song	Artist	Reference
1	"Rockstar"	Post Malone featuring 21 Savage	
2	"Rockstar"	Post Malone featuring 21 Savage	
3	"Havana"	Camila Cabello featuring Young Thug	
4	"Havana"	Camila Cabello featuring Young Thug	
5	"God's Plan"	Drake	
6	"God's Plan"	Drake	
7	"God's Plan"	Drake	
8	"God's Plan"	Drake	
9	"God's Plan"	Drake	
10	"God's Plan"	Drake	
11	"God's Plan"	Drake	
12	"God's Plan"	Drake	
13	"God's Plan"	Drake	
14	"God's Plan"	Drake	
15	"God's Plan"	Drake	
16	"Faz Gostoso"	Blaya	
17	"No Tears Left to Cry"	Ariana Grande	
18	"Faz Gostoso"	Blaya	
19	"Faz Gostoso"	Blaya	
20	"Faz Gostoso"	Blaya	
21	"Faz Gostoso"	Blaya	
22	"One Kiss"	Calvin Harris and Dua Lipa	
23	"One Kiss"	Calvin Harris and Dua Lipa	
24	"One Kiss"	Calvin Harris and Dua Lipa	
25	"One Kiss"	Calvin Harris and Dua Lipa	
26	"Sad!"	XXXTentacion	
27	"Sad!"	XXXTentacion	
28	"X"	Nicky Jam and J Balvin	
29	"In My Feelings"	Drake	
30	"In My Feelings"	Drake	
31	"In My Feelings"	Drake	
32	"In My Feelings"	Drake	
33	"In My Feelings"	Drake	
34	"In My Feelings"	Drake	
35	"In My Feelings"	Drake	
36	"In My Feelings"	Drake	
37	"In My Feelings"	Drake	
38	"Mafiosa"	Lartiste featuring Caroliina	
39	"Cafeína"	DJ Dadda featuring Plutónio	
40	"Cafeína"	DJ Dadda featuring Plutónio	
41	"Cafeína"	DJ Dadda featuring Plutónio	
42	"Taki Taki"	DJ Snake featuring Selena Gomez, Ozuna and Cardi B	
43	"Taki Taki"	DJ Snake featuring Selena Gomez, Ozuna and Cardi B	
44	"Taki Taki"	DJ Snake featuring Selena Gomez, Ozuna and Cardi B	
45	"Taki Taki"	DJ Snake featuring Selena Gomez, Ozuna and Cardi B	
46	"Thank U, Next"	Ariana Grande	
47	"Shallow"	Lady Gaga and Bradley Cooper	
48	"Shallow"	Lady Gaga and Bradley Cooper	
49	"Thank U, Next"	Ariana Grande	
50	"Thank U, Next"	Ariana Grande	
51	"Thank U, Next"	Ariana Grande	
52	"All I Want for Christmas Is You"	Mariah Carey	

== See also ==
- List of number-one albums of 2018 (Portugal)
