= List of number-one singles of 2017 (Portugal) =

The Portuguese Singles Chart ranks the best-performing singles in Portugal, as compiled by the Associação Fonográfica Portuguesa.

Number-one singles of 2017 in Portugal
Week	Song	Artist	Reference
1	"Starboy"	The Weeknd featuring Daft Punk	
2	"Shape of You"	Ed Sheeran	
3	"Shape of You"	Ed Sheeran	
4	"Shape of You"	Ed Sheeran	
5	"Shape of You"	Ed Sheeran	
6	"Shape of You"	Ed Sheeran	
7	"Shape of You"	Ed Sheeran	
8	"Shape of You"	Ed Sheeran	
9	"Shape of You"	Ed Sheeran	
10	"Shape of You"	Ed Sheeran	
11	"Shape of You"	Ed Sheeran	
12	"Shape of You"	Ed Sheeran	
13	"Despacito"	Luis Fonsi featuring Daddy Yankee	
14	"Shape of You"	Ed Sheeran	
15	"Despacito"	Luis Fonsi featuring Daddy Yankee	
16	"Despacito"	Luis Fonsi featuring Daddy Yankee	
17	"Despacito"	Luis Fonsi featuring Daddy Yankee	
18	"Despacito"	Luis Fonsi featuring Daddy Yankee	
19	"Despacito"	Luis Fonsi featuring Daddy Yankee	
20	"Amar pelos dois"	Salvador Sobral	
21	"Despacito"	Luis Fonsi featuring Daddy Yankee	
22	"Despacito"	Luis Fonsi featuring Daddy Yankee	
23	"Despacito"	Luis Fonsi featuring Daddy Yankee	
24	"Despacito"	Luis Fonsi featuring Daddy Yankee	
25	"Despacito"	Luis Fonsi featuring Daddy Yankee	
26	"Despacito"	Luis Fonsi featuring Daddy Yankee	
27	"Despacito"	Luis Fonsi featuring Daddy Yankee	
28	"Despacito"	Luis Fonsi featuring Daddy Yankee	
29	"Despacito"	Luis Fonsi featuring Daddy Yankee	
30	"Despacito"	Luis Fonsi featuring Daddy Yankee	
31	"Despacito"	Luis Fonsi featuring Daddy Yankee	
32	"Despacito"	Luis Fonsi featuring Daddy Yankee	
33	"Despacito"	Luis Fonsi featuring Daddy Yankee	
34	"Mi Gente"	J Balvin and Willy William	
35	"Felices los 4"	Maluma	
36	"Mi Gente"	J Balvin and Willy William	
37	"Mi Gente"	J Balvin and Willy William	
38	"Mi Gente"	J Balvin and Willy William	
39	"Rockstar"	Post Malone featuring 21 Savage	
40	"Mi Gente"	J Balvin and Willy William	
41	"Rockstar"	Post Malone featuring 21 Savage	
42	"Rockstar"	Post Malone featuring 21 Savage	
43	"Rockstar"	Post Malone featuring 21 Savage	
44	"Rockstar"	Post Malone featuring 21 Savage	
45	"Rockstar"	Post Malone featuring 21 Savage	
46	"Rockstar"	Post Malone featuring 21 Savage	
47	"Rockstar"	Post Malone featuring 21 Savage	
48	"Rockstar"	Post Malone featuring 21 Savage	
49	"Rockstar"	Post Malone featuring 21 Savage	
50	"Rockstar"	Post Malone featuring 21 Savage	
51	"Rockstar"	Post Malone featuring 21 Savage	
52	"Rockstar"	Post Malone featuring 21 Savage	

== See also ==
- List of number-one albums of 2017 (Portugal)
