= Despacito =

2017 single by Luis Fonsi featuring Daddy Yankee

Single by Luis Fonsi featuring Daddy Yankee

from the album Vida
- Language: Spanish
- Released: January 13, 2017
- Recorded: 2016
- Studio: Noisematch (Miami, US)
- Genre: Reggaeton; Latin pop
- Length: 3:47
- Label: Universal Latin
- Songwriters: Luis Fonsi; Erika Ender; Daddy Yankee
- Producers: Mauricio Rengifo; Andrés Torres

Luis Fonsi singles chronology
| "Tentación" (2015) | "Despacito" (2017) | "Wave Your Flag" (2017) |

Daddy Yankee singles chronology
| "La Rompe Corazones" (2017) | "Despacito" (2017) | "Despacito" (remix) (2017) |

Music video
- "Despacito" on YouTube

"Despacito" (Latin American Spanish: [despaˈsito]; transl. "Slowly") is a Spanish-language song recorded by Puerto Rican singer Luis Fonsi, featuring Puerto Rican rapper Daddy Yankee. On January 13, 2017, it was released as the lead single from Vida, Fonsi's tenth studio album. Written by Fonsi and Panamanian-American and Brazilian singer-songwriter Erika Ender in collaboration with Yankee between 2015 and 2016, it was produced by Colombian record producers Mauricio Rengifo and Andrés Torres in 2016. An English-language remix featuring Canadian pop singer Justin Bieber was released on April 17, 2017, with added lyrics by Bieber, and American singer-songwriters Poo Bear and Marty James.

Topping the charts in 47 countries, including the United States, the United Kingdom, Canada, Australia, Germany, France, Italy and Spain, and reaching the top 10 of six others, "Despacito" has been listed among the best Latin songs ever by various publications, with some referring to it as one of the most successful Spanish-language tracks in pop music history. It has been credited by music journalists as being the most instrumental song in spreading the popularity of Spanish-language music in the mainstream global market since "La Bamba" by Los Lobos in 1987 and "Macarena" by Los Del Rio featuring the Bayside Boys in 1995.

In the United States, it became the first Spanish-language song to top the Billboard Hot 100 since "Macarena" in 1996, subsequently tying as the longest-reigning number one on the Billboard Hot 100 at the time with 16 weeks, as well as becoming the longest-running number one on the Hot Latin Songs chart with 56 weeks from 2017 to 2026. It became the second Spanish-language song to be nominated for the Grammy Awards, earning nominations for Song of the Year, Record of the Year, and Best Pop Duo/Group Performance, and surpassing the first Spanish-language song nominated for the awards, "La Bamba," which received a nomination in the first two categories in 1988. It was the first Latin song to receive a digital Diamond certification by the Recording Industry Association of America, selling over 13 million units, while also earning more than 141 digital Latin Platinum certifications with over 8 millions units sold, becoming the best-selling and highest certified Latin single in U.S. history. In 2025, Billboard magazine named it the most successful Latin song of the 21st century.

The music video shows both Luis Fonsi and Daddy Yankee performing the song in the La Perla neighborhood of Old San Juan, Puerto Rico, and local bar La Factoría. It held the record for most-viewed YouTube video between August 2017 and November 2020, when it was overtaken by Pinkfong's Baby Shark. It became the first video on the site to reach the milestones of three, four, five, six, seven, and eight billion views. It also held the record for most-liked YouTube video between July 2017 and January 2025, when it was overtaken by MrBeast's Would You Fly to Paris for a Baguette? It became the first video on the site to reach 15, 20, 30, 40, 50, and 55 million likes.

== Background ==
=== Original version ===
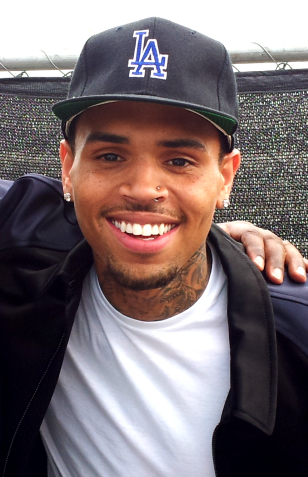
According to the song's producers, singer and songwriter Chris Brown (pictured) served as the inspiration for the track's sound.

The lyrics of "Despacito" were written in late 2015 in Luis Fonsi's house in Miami because he wanted to record a "swinging song" for his new album after two years without releasing new music. He said that he woke up mulling about "a song called 'Despacito'", and invited Brazilian-Panamanian singer and songwriter Erika Ender to a songwriting session. Fonsi co-wrote the song on a Gibson Emmylou Harris guitar. He originally composed it as a cumbia and pop song with lyrics written as a ballad, but decided to give it an "urban injection" and sent a demo to reggaeton artist Daddy Yankee. They recorded the song at Noisematch Studios in Miami in late 2016. Daddy Yankee improvised his verse in a corner of the studio's control room, later saying that he was thinking about his father playing bongos, and also wrote the post-chorus. It was produced by Mauricio Rengifo and Andrés Torres; the former is known as a member of Colombian pop duo Cali y El Dandee and the latter is known for previously working with David Bisbal, Thalía, and Ricky Martin. It was mixed by American engineer Jaycen Joshua at Larrabee Sound Studios in North Hollywood, Los Angeles. Mixing engineer Jaycen Joshua has cited Chris Brown's influence on the record, recalling that the Colombian producers studied his recordings and sought to emulate their low-end sound for the track.

Luis Fonsi says that he does not consider it a reggaeton song, but that "it does have a reggaeton energy and an subtle urban beat". Ender stated that the track "went through several arrangements" until Fonsi got "exactly the arrangement he wanted". Fonsi described "Despacito" as a very melodic song that can adapt well to many other music genres. Due to the sensual nature of the song, they "needed to be responsible with a good lyric" and Ender's approach to writing for Fonsi was "to take care of how to say things with a good taste [sic]". American singer and songwriter Nicky Jam has recorded the original version of "Despacito" rather Daddy Yankee, but had to withdraw from the song due to its release conflicting with an album of his own.

=== Justin Bieber remix ===
"Despacito" (remix)

Single by Luis Fonsi and Daddy Yankee featuring Justin Bieber

from the album Vida
- Language: Spanish; English
- Released: April 17, 2017
- Recorded: April 13, 2017
- Studio: Noisematch (Miami, U.S.); Audiovisión (Bogotá, Colombia)
- Genre: Reggaeton; Latin pop
- Length: 3:48
- Label: Republic; RBMG; Def Jam; School Boy
- Songwriters: Rodríguez; Ender; Ayala; Justin Bieber; Jason Boyd; Marty James
- Producers: Rengifo; Torres; Josh Gudwin

Luis Fonsi singles chronology
| "Wave Your Flag" (2017) | "Despacito" (remix) (2017) | "Kissing Strangers" (remix) (2017) |

Daddy Yankee singles chronology
| "Despacito" (2017) | "Despacito" (remix) (2017) | "Vuelve" (2017) |

Justin Bieber singles chronology
| "Deja Vu" (2016) | "Despacito" (remix) (2017) | "I'm the One" (2017) |

Audio video
- "Despacito" (remix) on YouTube

Three months after the release of "Despacito", Canadian singer Justin Bieber wanted to record a remix version after hearing the song in a Colombian nightclub during a tour in South America. The following day, Fonsi received a phone call from Universal Latin about the intentions for a remix and authorized the label to send the track to Bieber. Bieber's manager, Scooter Braun, contacted his vocal producer Josh Gudwin to work on the song, who flew to Bogotá and recorded Justin Bieber's vocals at Estudios Audiovisión.

Bieber sang in Spanish for the first time in his career with the help of Colombian musician Juan Felipe Samper, who noted that what was most difficult for Justin Bieber was the 'ere' (ɾ) sound in words like "laberinto" (labyrinth), "paredes" (walls) and "manuscrito" (manuscript). Samper wrote the Spanish-language lyrics phonetically to ease Bieber's pronunciation, which was "perfectly" achieved in two hours. After a four-hour recording session, Gudwin sent Bieber's vocal tracks to Australian sound engineer Chris O'Ryan for vocal tuning. Gudwin concluded the remix's production in Parrot Cay, Turks and Caicos Islands with the mixing of Luis Fonsi's English-language vocals, whose lyrics were written by American songwriter Marty James. The entire process until the release date took six days. In June 2017, English musician Ed Sheeran revealed that he wanted to record a remix version of the song, but lost out to Justin Bieber.

== Composition ==
"Despacito" is a reggaeton and Latin pop song composed in common time (4/4 time), with a length of three minutes and forty-seven seconds, and written in the key of B minor with a tempo of 89 beats per minute and a common chord progression of Bm—G—D—A. The vocals span from F♯_{3} to B_{4}. Its implicit lyrics are about having a sexual relationship in a smooth and romantic way, making heavy use of allegories. However, Luis Fonsi expressed that some lines are free for interpretation.

"Despacito" (original version) sample
Partial bridge and partial chorus of "Despacito"

Mauricio Rengifo and Andrés Torres produced "Despacito" using Pro Tools and the final mix consisted of 47 tracks. The song begins with a Puerto Rican cuatro played by Christian Nieves, which is accompanied by an acoustic guitar played by Torres when Luis Fonsi starts performing. Rengifo stated that the guitar "was actually played, but then [they] chopped it and made it really digital." The producers decided to record a cuatro because they wanted "to feel very Puerto Rican and ethnic" and that it "gives the song a really unique character". Nieves played salsa-influenced melodies during the chorus and the hook, which contains "old school pop" effects based on American producer Dr. Luke. Percussion instruments guache and güira were synchronized with a hi hat in order to highlight the track's cumbia influences.

The song uses the side-chaining production technique in order to make the chorus "more prominent", silencing the music as the kick drum hits. It also makes heavy use of text painting when the music is slowed down as the word "despacito" (slowly) is performed at the beginning of every chorus. Its percussion consists of guache, cowbell, timbales, güira, and sequenced drum patterns. The remix featuring Justin Bieber maintained the original rhythms, and Luis Fonsi translated some lines to English, singing a verse in Spanglish, while Daddy Yankee's verses were kept from the original version.

== Release and reception ==
"Despacito" was made available for digital download on January 13, 2017, by Universal Music Latin. Some music publications believed the single's success was influenced by a trend of combining Latin pop and urban music. Fonsi referred to it as "the new pop" and Ender said that "everyone is making this type of fusions [sic]". Luis Fonsi also stated that two weeks after the release of the song and its music video, he started receiving calls from "people who normally don't call, people who only call when something different is going on." He says that he got calls from Ricky Martin, Juan Luis Guerra, Marc Anthony and other artists telling him that the track was a "home run".

Sebastian Wernke-Schmiesing of Dance-Charts journal stated that "a simple 4/4 time, Spanish guitar sounds, a crisp bass, and the excellent vocals by Luis Fonsi and [Daddy Yankee] were enough to get a hit single from the start." Leila Cobo of Billboard praised its "undeniable immediate catchiness", and wrote that the song "is a clever blend of romantic Latin pop with a reggaeton beat and subtly naughty lyrics". Robert Joffred of Medium's culture blog That Good You Need highlighted the use of a steel-string guitar to play flamenco-style melodies instead of a nylon-string guitar, as well as the presence of "swung rhythms" when the word "Despacito" is sung at the beginning of the chorus. He referred to the text painting as "pretty genius". Raisa Bruner of Time magazine described the single as "an infectious Latin melody amped up with reggaeton grooves and an irresistible dance tune".

Spanish record producer Nahúm García stated that "the way the rhythm breaks before the chorus is genius", and that this "trick" in particular is not common in pop music. Joshua Barrie of Irish Mirror gave a negative opinion about the lyrics, referring to them as "quite rude and a bit creepy". On the other hand, an editor of Spanish music website Jenesaispop stated that "the melody is very good, the lyrics are sexy without being vulgar and above all its structure is interesting." Felix Contreras of National Public Radio praised the writing, arrangement and performances.

The remix version featuring Justin Bieber was released on April 17, 2017, by Universal Music Latin, Republic Records, Def Jam Recordings, RBMG and Schoolboy Records. Its official audio video garnered 20 million views on YouTube in its first 24 hours, the third most for a music-related video in between January and September 2017. Caroline Soriano of Ernstars magazine stated that Bieber's voice "sounds appealing with the song", whose remix version make it sound "a little bit better". Mike Senior of Sound on Sound gave a negative review of the remix's mixing by criticizing its polarity inversion regarding the original version, and Justin Bieber's louder vocal track than Daddy Yankee's. As to the original version, Senior referred to the first appearance of the "Despacito" hook line as a "masterstroke".

In July 2017, officials from the Government of Malaysia reported that "Despacito" was being banned from airing on government-owned broadcast stations as a result of public complaints. Government ministers said that the song was considered un-Islamic and that its lyrics were "not suitable to be heard".

=== Accolades ===
"Despacito" has received various awards and nominations following its commercial success. In 2017, the original version won three awards at the 18th Latin Grammy Awards including Record of the Year, Song of the Year and Best Short Form Music Video, while the remix version won Best Urban Fusion/Performance. It also won Collaboration of the Year and was nominated for Video of the Year at the 45th American Music Awards. In 2018, the remix version received three nominations for Record of the Year, Song of the Year, and Best Pop Duo/Group Performance at the 60th Grammy Awards. The remix also received six Billboard Latin Music Awards and five Billboard Music Awards. Erika Ender became the youngest person to be inducted into the Latin Songwriters Hall of Fame and the first female Latin artist to garner a Grammy Award for Song of the Year nomination.

Billboard's critics ranked the original version the fourth best song of 2017 and the fifth best Latin song of all time, referring to it as "one of the biggest hits in Latin music history" and "one of the biggest singles of all time." Rolling Stone and Time selected it as the seventh and third best song of 2017, respectively; the latter stating that "in a year where xenophobia reared its head worldwide, it inspires hope that the charts were dominated by such a universal, multicultural hit." Spin magazine ranked the remix version the 38th best song of the year, stating that "it managed to transcend genre, time, space, and even personal taste in a way that was unprecedented." It was also included among the 100 best singles of 2017 by PopSugar, The New York Times, National Public Radio, The Village Voice, and The Guardian. Luis Fonsi and Daddy Yankee were selected as the "Stars of the Year" by People en Español.

Rolling Stone's critics ranked the track 91st in its "100 Greatest Songs of the Century So Far" list and included it among the 50 greatest Latin pop songs of all time, describing it as "one of the most successful hits in pop music history". Billboard selected it among the best Latin summer songs of all-time and included it among the 100 songs that defined the 2010s decade. The song was inducted to the 2019 edition of the Guinness World Records for achieving seven milestones.

== Commercial performance ==
=== United States ===
In the United States, the single debuted at number two on Billboard's multi-metric Hot Latin Songs chart on February 4, 2017, becoming Fonsi's highest-charting single since "Aquí Estoy Yo" on June 13, 2009. "Despacito" reached number one on the US Hot Latin Songs chart on February 18, 2017, where it remained there for 35 consecutive weeks until October 14, 2017, when it was dethroned by "Mi Gente" by J Balvin and Willy William featuring Beyoncé the following issue. In 2018, it returned to number one in three different runs for 21 non-consecutive weeks. It is the longest-reigning number-one on Hot Latin Songs and surpassed the 41 weeks of 2014's "Bailando" by Enrique Iglesias featuring Descemer Bueno and Gente de Zona on February 17, 2018. "Despacito" became the list's second longest-charting title and was removed from the chart on March 9, 2019, after 110 weeks due to a recurrent rule.

On the US Billboard Hot 100 chart, the single debuted at number 88 on February 4, 2017, becoming Fonsi's third entry and Daddy Yankee's seventh. It subsequently peaked at number 44 on April 15, 2017, before the release of the remix version featuring Justin Bieber. "Despacito" reached number one on the Hot 100 on the week ending May 27, 2017, becoming both Fonsi and Daddy Yankee's first number one on the chart and Bieber's fifth. It topped the Hot 100 for 16 consecutive weeks, tying with "One Sweet Day" by Mariah Carey and Boyz II Men as the longest-leading number-one single in the chart's history at the time, before being surpassed by "Old Town Road" by Lil Nas X featuring Billy Ray Cyrus on August 3, 2019. It also became the first mostly-Spanish-language song to lead the all-genre US Digital Songs chart, as well as the first non-primarily-English-language song to top the all-format Radio Songs and Mainstream Top 40 charts. On October 21, 2017, "Despacito" and "Mi Gente" by J Balvin and Willy William featuring Beyoncé marked the first time ever that two non-primarily-English-language songs ranked within the top 10 of the Hot 100 simultaneously. The song spent 52 weeks on the Hot 100 and was removed through a recurrent rule.

"Despacito" was the best-selling and most-streamed single of 2017 in the United States, with 2,692,000 downloads sold and 1,322,799,000 streams. It was also the sixth most-played song of 2017, with 608,000 spins across US radio stations and an audience of 3,076,935,000. It ranked at number two on the Hot 100 year-end chart and was the best-performing single on Hot Latin Songs for two years in a row in 2017 and 2018. In the United States, the single sold 2,983,000 downloads as of June 20, 2019 (Note: Nielsen SoundScan reported that "Despacito" sold 2,692,000 downloads in the tracking period of December 30, 2016 through December 28, 2017, 246,000 downloads in the tracking period of December 29, 2017 through June 28, 2018, and 45,000 downloads in the tracking period of January 4, 2019 through June 20, 2019, adding up a total of 2,983,000 downloads sold. Nielsen SoundScan did not provide data from June 29, 2018 to January 3, 2019.) and received a 13× platinum certification by the Recording Industry Association of America (RIAA) on January 6, 2020, for units of over 13 million sales plus track-equivalent streams, making it the 14th highest-certified single of all time in the United States. It became the first Latin and 18th overall single to receive a diamond certification by the RIAA. It was the ninth best-performing single of the 2010s decade on the Hot 100 and was ranked at number one on the Hot Latin Songs chart. It is the best-performing track of all-time on Hot Latin Songs and the 33rd best-performing on the Hot 100.

=== International ===
Internationally, "Despacito" has topped the charts of 47 countries, including the original version alone and combined chart entries with the remix version featuring Justin Bieber. The song spent 26 weeks at number one in Spain, 20 in Switzerland, 18 in France, 17 Germany, 16 in Canada, 14 in Italy, 13 in Australia and 11 in the United Kingdom, among others. Across Europe, the song was certified 13× platinum in Sweden and Spain, diamond in France and Italy and 4× platinum in the United Kingdom and Germany, among others. It also received a diamond certification in Canada and a 5× platinum certification in Australia. In Latin America, it was certified 6× diamond in Brazil and 5× diamond and 4× platinum in Mexico. The remix version alone topped the charts of five countries and was certified platinum in New Zealand and Brazil and gold in Germany.

In the United Kingdom, "Despacito" was the second best-selling and most-streamed song of the year, with 2.3 million combined sales. It was also the best-selling single of 2017 in Canada, with more than 300,000 digital sales. It topped the 2017 year-end charts of 16 countries and was the second best-performing song in 15 others. In Latin America, it was the most-played radio song of 2017, with 580,450 spins, as well as the best-performing foreign song of the year in Brazil. "Despacito" was the second best-selling single of 2017 across the world, with 24.3 million sales plus track-equivalent streams. In 2018, it was the sixth best-selling song of the year, with 11.8 million sales plus track-equivalent streams, and was the 72nd most-played song in Latin America, with 107,980 spins. "Despacito" also peaked at number 114 on the recently inducted Billboard Global 200 chart on the issue date August 7, 2021.

"Despacito" became the world's most-streamed song of all time in July 2017, with 4.6 billion streams between the original and remix version. By this time, Universal Music Group awarded Luis Fonsi with a "Plutonium Disc" in recognition of global sales of "Despacito". It was streamed 7.5 billion times as of April 2018. The remix version became the first primarily-Spanish-language song to surpass one billion streams on Spotify in February 2018, while the original became the first non-English single to reach the milestone in June 2019. In the United Kingdom, it became the longest-reigning foreign language number-one and is the 30th best-selling single in the country with 1,900,599 combined sales as of September 19, 2017. It also became the song with the most weeks at number one in Switzerland and Germany.

== Impact ==
The success of the song and its remix version led Daddy Yankee to become the most listened-to artist worldwide on streaming service Spotify on July 9, 2017, being the first Latin artist to do so. He later became the sixth most listened-to artist of 2017 on Spotify. "Despacito" was cited by Billboard's Leila Cobo as the song that renewed interest in the Latin music market from recording labels in the United States. Xander Zellner of Billboard credited the influence of the single's success for the Latin music domination in the US mainstream market during 2017, as 11 primarily-Spanish-language songs debuted on the Hot 100. American songwriter Desmond Child and Cuban musician Rudy Pérez expressed that "not since Ricky Martin's 'Livin' La Vida Loca' has there been a song in any genre that has had the global impact of 'Despacito', changing the course of pop music forever." In 2017, six out of the 10 most-viewed YouTube music videos were for songs performed in Spanish by Latin artists and Billboard's Lars Brandle referred to it as "the 'Despacito' effect."

British Official Charts Company recognized it as the song that "helped Latin pop crossover to the mainstream once again." Nielsen's Erin Crawford stated that the track had "a halo effect on several other Latin hits ripe for crossover success", most notably on J Balvin and Willy William's "Mi Gente" Rolling Stone stated that the song "hastened a massive historical turn in American music, demonstrating the mainstream viability of Spanish-language pop." John Ochoa of Rolling Stone stated that "the resulting so-called 'Despacito effect' has advanced a wave of subsequent Spanish-language hits and mainstream crossovers."

The Recording Industry Association of America reported that Latin music revenues grew 37% in 2017, mostly due to music streaming. Latin music's consumption in the United States increased 15% between the first half of 2016 and the first half of 2018. The International Federation of the Phonographic Industry (IFPI) reported that revenue in Latin America grew 17.7% in 2017 and described "Despacito" as a "game-changing hit." In 2018, eight out of the 10 most-viewed YouTube music videos of the year were for songs performed in Spanish and the Canadian Broadcasting Corporation referred to it as "the 'Despacito' effect."

Sony/ATV Music Publishing President Jorge Mejia stated that the song marked a "before and after" in the global consumption of Latin music. Before its success, Sony "had a big Latin single roughly every two years," a situation that reverted into an "avalanche of Latin songs around the world." Andrew Unterberger of Billboard stated that "2017 was the year that Latin pop took over the United States" due to the song and its quick impact on "Mi Gente", Camila Cabello's "Havana", and the chart performance of acts including Maluma, Ozuna and Bad Bunny, who achieved their biggest hits in the country.

In July 2017, it was reported that tourist interest in Puerto Rico increased by 45% since the worldwide success of the song. Tour operators cite the song's music video for increasing interest in locations such as La Factoría and La Perla district in Old San Juan, which were featured in the video.

== Music video ==
=== Background ===
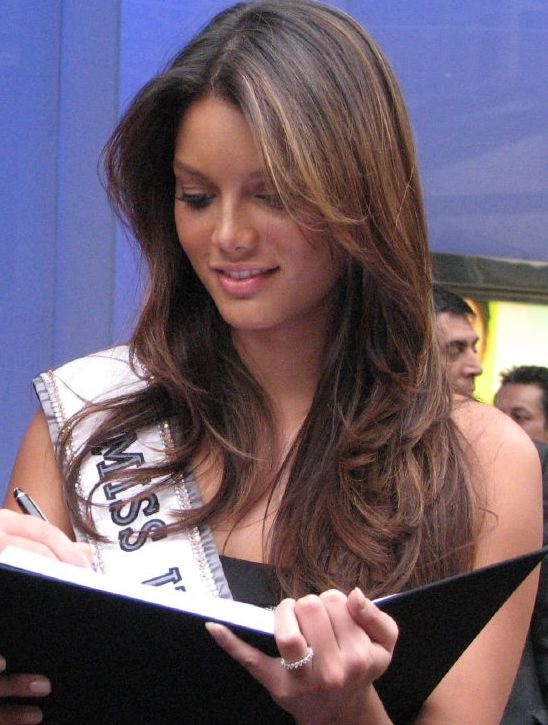
2006 Miss Universe Zuleyka Rivera also starred in the music video.

The music video for "Despacito" was directed by Puerto Rican director Carlos Pérez and produced by Joanna Egozcue and Roxy Quiñones. Filming took place in December 2016 in La Perla neighborhood and the bar La Factoría in San Juan, Puerto Rico. Carlos Pérez had previously worked with Luis Fonsi on "Corazón en la Maleta" (2014) and with Daddy Yankee on clips including "Gasolina" (2004), "Rompe" (2005), "Descontrol" (2010), and "Ven Conmigo" (2011), among others. 2006 Miss Universe Zuleyka Rivera co-starred in the video and was contacted by Fonsi to represent "the powerful Latina woman."

Jorge Muñíz Ortíz of EFE stated that the music video "highlights some of the main cultural and folkloric symbols of Puerto Rico" by showing its "splendid beaches, the colorful landscape of La Perla, the rattle of the Puerto Rican cuatro and the barrels of the autochthonous genre of bomba, Zuleyka Rivera's hips movement and a pair of men enjoying a game of dominoes."

=== Synopsis ===
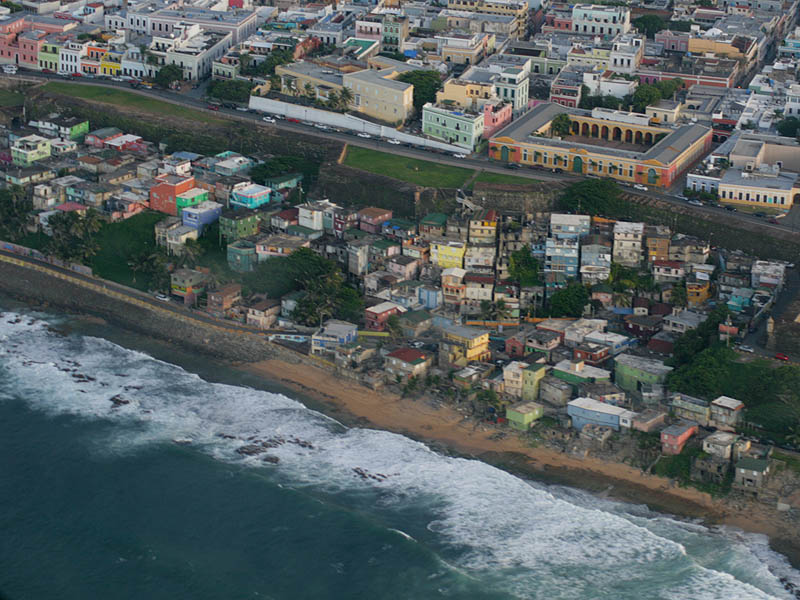
An aerial view of colorful La Perla in San Juan.

The video shows both artists performing the song while participating on different parties on the island, featuring model Zuleyka Rivera. The clip starts with shots of La Perla's coast during daylight while showing Zuleyka Rivera arriving at the shanty town on foot. Luis Fonsi and Daddy Yankee perform the song in a street while elders are playing dominos, a child is getting his hair cut, two people are talking while listening to the radio, and couples are dancing in the background. The video intercalates with shots of Fonsi and Daddy Yankee singing in front of a car with people sitting on it and dancing next to it. As Daddy Yankee is finishing his verse, Zuleyka Rivera enters La Factoría bar while the artists are performing and dancing alongside other people, and men are playing bomba drums. Fonsi proceeds to dance with Rivera as the song ends. The outro consists of Luis Fonsi and Daddy Yankee singing the hook a cappella with the people at the bar.

=== Release and reception ===
The official music video on YouTube was released on Fonsi's channel on January 12, 2017, and amassed one billion views in 97 days, becoming the second-fastest video on the site to reach the milestone. It also became the fastest video on YouTube to surpass two billion views, with 154 days. The clip became the first on YouTube to receive three, four, five, and six billion views on August 4, 2017; October 11, 2017; April 5, 2018; and February 24, 2019, respectively (dates are based on UTC). It has received over 8.4 billion views as of June, 2024, and was the most-viewed video on the site from August 4, 2017, until November 2, 2020, when Pinkfong's video for "Baby Shark" surpassed it, dethroning it to second place, where it has remained since. It has also received over 54 million likes as of January 2025, and was the site's most-liked video from July 25, 2017, to January 27, 2025, when MrBeast's "Would You Fly to Paris for a Baguette?" Shorts surpassed it. It remains the site's second most-liked video and most-liked non-Shorts video. On Vevo, the music video received 5.14 million views in its first 24 hours of release, which the website reported as being the most for a Spanish-language video's first day on its platform.

The music video received a Latin Grammy Award for Best Short Form Music Video at the 18th Latin Grammy Awards and a Billboard Music Award for Top Streaming Song (Video) at the 25th Billboard Music Awards, and was nominated for an American Music Award for Video of the Year at the 45th American Music Awards.

== Live performances ==
Luis Fonsi and Daddy Yankee performed "Despacito" live together for the first time at the 2017 Billboard Latin Music Awards on April 27, 2017, and later on The Voice season 12 finals on May 23, 2017. The only live performance by Justin Bieber and Luis Fonsi was at the José Miguel Agrelot Coliseum in Puerto Rico on April 18, 2017, during the former's Purpose World Tour. Bieber was not able to sing the song during live performances and was caught replacing portions of the lyrics with the word "blah" and nonsensical ramblings during one performance in a much publicized incident. Fonsi has defended him for not knowing the lyrics, saying that he has to be given "a little bit of a pass" because Spanish is not Bieber's main language.

Luis Fonsi performed "Despacito" on American talk show Conan on June 12, 2017 -his first late-night television appearance in the United States- and on The Ellen DeGeneres Show on September 14, 2017. He also performed the song with random lyrics alongside American television host Jimmy Fallon on The Tonight Show Starring Jimmy Fallon on January 30, 2019.

Both Luis Fonsi and Daddy Yankee included the song on their setlists for the 2017–18 Love + Dance World Tour and the 2017 Tamo En Vivo Europe Tour, respectively. On November 16, 2017, Luis Fonsi sang "Despacito" featuring Puerto Rican singer Victor Manuelle, Colombian band Bomba Estéreo and American disc jockey Diplo at the 18th Latin Grammy Awards. On January 28, 2018, Luis Fonsi and Daddy Yankee performed the song at the 60th Grammy Awards on the Madison Square Garden, becoming the 12th and 13th Latin artists ever to perform at the Grammy Awards. Fonsi also participated on United States President Joe Biden's inauguration by performing "Despacito" at the Celebrating America special on January 20, 2021.

== Other remixes and cover versions ==
The first two official remixes for "Despacito" were released on March 17, 2017: a solo pop version by Fonsi and a salsa version featuring vocals by Puerto Rican musician Víctor Manuelle. Two other remixes were released on May 5, 2017: an electronic dance version produced by American trio Major Lazer and Colombian DJ MOSKA and an urban version remixed by Colombian producer Sky. A Portuguese-language version written by Erika Ender and performed by Luis Fonsi featuring Brazilian singer Israel Novaes was released on July 14, 2017. A banda version by Luis Fonsi with Mexican group La Bandononona Clave Nueva De Max Peraza was released on September 1, 2017. A Spanish/Mandarin version by Luis Fonsi and Singaporean singer-songwriter JJ Lin was released on January 26, 2018. A Norwegian version was released by Carina Dahl and Adrian Jørgensen in February 2018. This version was certified Gold by IFPI Norway in 2019 and Platinum in 2021.

The song has been covered by a wide range of artists around the world, including Korean singer J.Fla, a classical crossover by Croatian-based duo 2Cellos, a metal version by Norwegian musician Leo Moracchioli, a piano version by Hungarian pianist and world record-holder Peter Bence, an acoustic version by American band Boyce Avenue and a Broadway-style cover by American musical collective group Postmodern Jukebox. These covers garnered between seven and 47 million views on YouTube except for J.Fla's video, which has 217 million views. Leo Moracchioli's version peaked at number 35 on the Hungarian Single Top 40 chart on August 10, 2017. In 2017, American-Greek parody artist So Tiri released a viral Greek-language parody titled "Thes pastitsio" on his YouTube channel. "Weird Al" Yankovic covered the song as a part of his 2024 polka medley "Polkamania!".

=== Political uses ===
The song has been used, with altered lyrics, for political purposes. In Argentina, the melody was used by various politicians for their respective TV advertisements for the 2017 midterm elections, by scientists to protest against President Mauricio Macri and by feminists as an initiative to convoke people to a concentration about violence against women. Venezuelan President Nicolás Maduro used it to call for voting in the controversial Constituent Assembly election. Luis Fonsi, Daddy Yankee and Erika Ender showed their displeasure with the unauthorized use of the song for political purposes in Venezuela, criticizing Maduro's government use of the song as propaganda. On August 16, 2017, English television host James Corden remixed the song to comment on American President Donald Trump during his talk show The Late Late Show with James Corden. On September 15, 2020, Democratic presidential nominee Joe Biden played a few bars from the song at a campaign event headlined by Luis Fonsi. In response, Trump tweeted an edited video showing Biden instead playing N.W.A's "Fuck tha Police". In addition, the song was used by delegates from Puerto Rico at the 2024 Democratic National Convention to represent the territory.

Десь по світу ("Somewhere in the world") was a Ukrainian version of the song, produced featuring children in Drohobych Raion, to encourage the return of Ukrainians working abroad.

== Credits and personnel ==
Original version

Credits adapted from Tidal and The Latin Recording Academy.

- Erika Ender – songwriting
- Luis Fonsi – songwriting, vocals
- Jaycen Joshua – mixing
- Dave Kutch – mastering
- Christian Nieves – Puerto Rican cuatro
- Mauricio Rengifo – production, engineering
- Gaby Music – engineering
- Luis Saldarriaga – engineering
- Andrés Torres – production, engineering, acoustic guitar
- Daddy Yankee – songwriting, vocals

Justin Bieber remix

Credits adapted from Tidal and The Recording Academy.

- Justin Bieber – songwriting, vocals
- Jason Boyd – songwriting
- Josh Gudwin – production, engineering, remixing, mixing
- Marty James – songwriting
- Chris O'Ryan – engineering
- Juan Felipe Samper – vocal coach

== Charts ==
=== Weekly charts ===
Weekly chart performance for "Despacito"
| Chart (2017–2020) (Note: Chart peaks in Australia, Canada, Denmark, Ireland, Japan, Luxembourg, the Netherlands, the Philippines, Scotland, Sweden, the United Kingdom, the US Hot 100, US Digital Songs, US Hot Latin Songs and US Streaming Songs measure combined data between the original and the Justin Bieber remix version.) | Peak position |
|---|---|
| Argentina Airplay (Monitor Latino) | 1 |
| Australia (ARIA) | 1 |
| Austria (Ö3 Austria Top 40) | 1 |
| Belarus Airplay (Eurofest) | 1 |
| Belgium (Ultratop 50 Flanders) | 1 |
| Belgium (Ultratop 50 Wallonia) | 1 |
| Bolivia Airplay (Monitor Latino) | 1 |
| Brazil Hot 100 Airplay (Billboard) | 1 |
| Canada (Canadian Hot 100) | 1 |
| Canada AC (Billboard) | 3 |
| Canada CHR/Top 40 (Billboard) | 1 |
| Canada Hot AC (Billboard) | 1 |
| Chile Airplay (Monitor Latino) | 1 |
| CIS Airplay (TopHit) | 1 |
| Colombia Airplay (National-Report) | 1 |
| Costa Rica Airplay (Monitor Latino) | 1 |
| Croatia International Airplay (Top lista) | 1 |
| Czech Republic Airplay (ČNS IFPI) | 2 |
| Czech Republic Singles Digital (ČNS IFPI) | 1 |
| Denmark (Tracklisten) | 1 |
| Costa Rica Airplay (Monitor Latino) | 1 |
| Dominican Republic Airplay (Monitor Latino) | 2 |
| Ecuador Airplay (National-Report) | 1 |
| El Salvador Airplay (Monitor Latino) | 7 |
| Finland (Suomen virallinen lista) | 20 |
| France (SNEP) | 1 |
| Germany (GfK) | 1 |
| Greece Digital (Billboard) | 1 |
| Guatemala Airplay (Monitor Latino) | 1 |
| Hungary (Dance Top 40) | 2 |
| Hungary (Rádiós Top 40) | 1 |
| Hungary (Single Top 40) | 1 |
| Iceland (RÚV) | 9 |
| Ireland (IRMA) | 1 |
| Israel International Airplay (Media Forest) | 1 |
| Italy (FIMI) | 1 |
| Japan (Japan Hot 100) | 48 |
| Lebanon (Lebanese Top 20) | 1 |
| Luxembourg Digital Song Sales (Billboard) | 1 |
| Malaysia (RIM) | 8 |
| Mexico Airplay (Billboard) | 1 |
| Mexico Streaming (AMPROFON) | 1 |
| Netherlands (Dutch Top 40) | 1 |
| Netherlands (Single Top 100) | 1 |
| Norway (VG-lista) | 22 |
| Panama Airplay (Monitor Latino) | 1 |
| Paraguay Airplay (Monitor Latino) | 1 |
| Peru Airplay (Monitor Latino) | 1 |
| Philippines (Philippine Hot 100) | 1 |
| Poland Airplay (ZPAV) | 1 |
| Portugal (AFP) | 1 |
| Romania (Airplay 100) | 5 |
| Russia Airplay (TopHit) | 1 |
| Scotland (Official Charts Company) | 1 |
| Slovakia Airplay (ČNS IFPI) | 1 |
| Slovakia Singles Digital (ČNS IFPI) | 1 |
| Slovenia Airplay (SloTop50) | 1 |
| Spain (Promusicae) | 1 |
| Sweden (Sverigetopplistan) | 1 |
| Switzerland (Schweizer Hitparade) | 1 |
| Ukraine Airplay (TopHit) | 1 |
| UK Singles (Official Charts Company) | 1 |
| Uruguay Airplay (Monitor Latino) | 1 |
| US Billboard Hot 100 | 1 |
| US Hot Latin Songs | 1 |
| Venezuela Airplay (Record Report) | 1 |

2025 weekly chart performance for "Despacito"
| Chart (2025) | Peak position |
|---|---|
| Ukraine Airplay (TopHit) | 68 |

Weekly chart performance for "Despacito (Justin Bieber remix)"
| Chart (2017–2021) | Peak position |
|---|---|
| Argentina Hot 100 (Billboard) | 21 |
| Australia (ARIA) | 1 |
| Brazil Hot 100 Airplay (Billboard) | 16 |
| Canada Hot 100 (Billboard) | 1 |
| Denmark (Tracklisten) | 1 |
| Finland (Suomen virallinen lista) | 1 |
| Global 200 (Billboard) | 114 |
| Ireland (IRMA) | 1 |
| Italy (Musica e Dischi) | 9 |
| Japan (Japan Hot 100) | 28 |
| Latvia Streaming (DigiTop100) | 56 |
| Luxembourg Digital Songs (Billboard) | 1 |
| Malaysia Streaming (RIM) | 1 |
| Mexico Streaming (AMPROFON) | 2 |
| Netherlands (Dutch Top 40) | 1 |
| Netherlands (Single Top 100) | 1 |
| New Zealand (Recorded Music NZ) | 1 |
| Norway (VG-lista) | 1 |
| Philippines (Philippine Hot 100) | 1 |
| Poland Dance (ZPAV) | 1 |
| Scotland (Official Charts Company) | 1 |
| South Korea Foreign (Gaon) | 7 |
| Spain (Promusicae) | 14 |
| Sweden (Sverigetopplistan) | 1 |
| UK Singles (OCC) | 1 |
| Uruguay Airplay (Monitor Latino) | 1 |
| US Adult Contemporary (Billboard) | 24 |
| US Adult Pop Airplay (Billboard) | 9 |
| US Dance Club Songs (Billboard) | 8 |
| US Billboard Hot 100 | 1 |
| US Hot Latin Songs (Billboard) | 1 |
| US Pop Airplay (Billboard) | 1 |
| US Rhythmic Airplay (Billboard) | 3 |

=== Year-end charts ===
Year-end chart performance for "Despacito"
| Chart (2017) (Note: Year-end chart peaks in Australia, Canada, Denmark, the Netherlands, Sweden, the United Kingdom, the US Hot 100, US Digital Songs, US Hot Latin Songs and US Streaming Songs measure combined data between the original and the Justin Bieber remix version.) | Position |
|---|---|
| Argentina (Monitor Latino) | 1 |
| Australia (ARIA) | 2 |
| Austria (Ö3 Austria Top 40) | 1 |
| Belgium (Ultratop Flanders) | 2 |
| Belgium (Ultratop Wallonia) | 2 |
| Bolivia (Monitor Latino) | 1 |
| Canada (Canadian Hot 100) | 2 |
| Chile (Monitor Latino) | 1 |
| Colombia (Monitor Latino) | 1 |
| Denmark (Tracklisten) | 2 |
| Dominican Republic (Monitor Latino) | 2 |
| Ecuador (Monitor Latino) | 1 |
| El Salvador (Monitor Latino) | 11 |
| France (SNEP) | 2 |
| Germany (Official German Charts) | 2 |
| Guatemala (Monitor Latino) | 1 |
| Honduras (Monitor Latino) | 31 |
| Hungary (Dance Top 40) | 8 |
| Hungary (Rádiós Top 40) | 9 |
| Hungary (Single Top 40) | 2 |
| Israel International Airplay (Media Forest) | 2 |
| Italy (FIMI) | 1 |
| Latvia Airplay (LaIPA) | 3 |
| Mexico (Monitor Latino) | 1 |
| Netherlands (Dutch Top 40) | 2 |
| Netherlands (Single Top 100) | 2 |
| Nicaragua (Monitor Latino) | 30 |
| Panama (Monitor Latino) | 1 |
| Paraguay (Monitor Latino) | 1 |
| Peru (Monitor Latino) | 1 |
| Poland (ZPAV) | 8 |
| Portugal (AFP) | 1 |
| Romania (Airplay 100) | 24 |
| Russia (Tophit) | 3 |
| Slovenia (SloTop50) | 10 |
| Spain (PROMUSICAE) | 1 |
| Sweden (Sverigetopplistan) | 2 |
| Switzerland (Schweizer Hitparade) | 2 |
| UK Singles (Official Charts Company) | 2 |
| Ukraine (Tophit) | 20 |
| Uruguay (Monitor Latino) | 1 |
| US Billboard Hot 100 | 2 |
| US Hot Latin Songs (Billboard) | 1 |
| Venezuela (Monitor Latino) | 1 |

| Chart (2018) | Position |
|---|---|
| Argentina (Monitor Latino) | 56 |
| Bolivia (Monitor Latino) | 30 |
| Canada (Canadian Hot 100) | 25 |
| Chile (Monitor Latino) | 18 |
| Denmark (Tracklisten) | 34 |
| Ecuador (Monitor Latino) | 77 |
| El Salvador (Monitor Latino) | 42 |
| France (SNEP) | 57 |
| Germany (Official German Charts) | 47 |
| Guatemala (Monitor Latino) | 44 |
| Honduras (Monitor Latino) | 84 |
| Hungary (Dance Top 40) | 77 |
| Hungary (Rádiós Top 40) | 91 |
| Hungary (Single Top 40) | 17 |
| Nicaragua (Monitor Latino) | 88 |
| Panama (Monitor Latino) | 17 |
| Portugal (AFP) | 87 |
| Russia (Tophit) | 138 |
| South Korea Foreign Songs (Gaon) | 44 |
| Spain (PROMUSICAE) | 92 |
| Sweden (Sverigetopplistan) | 41 |
| Switzerland (Schweizer Hitparade) | 25 |
| Uruguay (Monitor Latino) | 36 |
| UK Singles (Official Charts Company) | 61 |
| Ukraine (Tophit) | 33 |
| US Digital Songs (Billboard) | 61 |
| US Hot Latin Songs (Billboard) | 1 |
| US Streaming Songs (Billboard) | 14 |

| Chart (2019) | Position |
|---|---|
| Bolivia (Monitor Latino) | 64 |
| Chile (Monitor Latino) | 44 |
| Panama (Monitor Latino) | 97 |
| US Hot Latin Songs (Billboard) | 14 |

| Chart (2020) | Position |
|---|---|
| Bolivia (Monitor Latino) | 42 |
| US Latin Digital Songs (Billboard) | 3 |
| US Latin Streaming Songs (Billboard) | 7 |

| Chart (2022) | Position |
|---|---|
| Ukraine Airplay (TopHit) | 184 |

| Chart (2025) | Position |
|---|---|
| Belarus Airplay (TopHit) | 141 |

Year-end chart performance for "Despacito (Justin Bieber remix)"
| Chart (2017) | Position |
|---|---|
| Australia (ARIA) | 2 |
| Brazil (Billboard) | 23 |
| Canada (Canadian Hot 100) | 2 |
| Denmark (Tracklisten) | 2 |
| Iceland (Tónlistinn) | 2 |
| Netherlands (Dutch Top 40) | 2 |
| Netherlands (Single Top 100) | 2 |
| New Zealand (Recorded Music NZ) | 2 |
| Norway (VG Lista) | 1 |
| South Korea Foreign Songs (Gaon) | 30 |
| Sweden (Sverigetopplistan) | 2 |
| Switzerland (Schweizer Hitparade) | 2 |
| UK Singles (Official Charts Company) | 2 |
| US Adult Top 40 (Billboard) | 33 |
| US Billboard Hot 100 | 2 |
| US Dance/Mix Show Airplay (Billboard) | 4 |
| US Hot Latin Songs (Billboard) | 1 |
| US Mainstream Top 40 (Billboard) | 7 |
| US Rhythmic (Billboard) | 15 |

| Chart (2018) | Position |
|---|---|
| Canada (Canadian Hot 100) | 25 |
| Denmark (Tracklisten) | 34 |
| South Korea Foreign Songs (Gaon) | 18 |
| Sweden (Sverigetopplistan) | 41 |
| UK Singles (Official Charts Company) | 61 |
| US Digital Songs (Billboard) | 61 |
| US Hot Latin Songs (Billboard) | 1 |
| US Streaming Songs (Billboard) | 14 |

| Chart (2019) | Position |
|---|---|
| US Hot Latin Songs (Billboard) | 14 |

| Chart (2021) | Position |
|---|---|
| Global 200 (Billboard) | 94 |

| Chart (2022) | Position |
|---|---|
| Global 200 (Billboard) | 153 |

=== Decade-end charts ===
| Chart (2010–2019) | Position |
|---|---|
| Australia (ARIA) | 29 |
| Germany (Official German Charts) | 2 |
| UK Singles (Official Charts Company) | 4 |
| US Billboard Hot 100 | 9 |
| US Hot Latin Songs (Billboard) | 1 |

=== All-time charts ===
| Chart | Position |
|---|---|
| US Billboard Hot 100 | 37 |
| US Hot Latin Songs (Billboard) | 1 |

== Certifications ==
=== For original version ===
| Region | Certification | Certified units/sales |
|---|---|---|
| Argentina (CAPIF) | 2× Platinum | 40,000^{*} |
| Austria (IFPI Austria) | 2× Platinum | 60,000^{‡} |
| Belgium (BRMA) | 5× Platinum | 100,000^{‡} |
| Brazil (Pro-Música Brasil) | 16× Diamond | 4,000,000^{‡} |
| France (SNEP) | Diamond | 233,333^{‡} |
| Germany (BVMI) | 9× Gold | 1,800,000^{‡} |
| Italy (FIMI) | Diamond | 500,000^{‡} |
| New Zealand (RMNZ) | Platinum | 30,000^{‡} |
| Norway (IFPI Norway) | 4× Platinum | 240,000^{‡} |
| Poland (ZPAV) | 2× Diamond | 200,000^{‡} |
| Portugal (AFP) | 5× Platinum | 50,000^{‡} |
| Spain (Promusicae) | 13× Platinum | 520,000^{‡} |
| Spain (Promusicae) Pop version | 10× Platinum | 400,000^{‡} |
| Switzerland (IFPI Switzerland) | Platinum | 20,000^{‡} |
| United States (RIAA) | 141× Platinum (Latin) | 8,460,000^{‡} |
^{*} Sales figures based on certification alone.^{‡} Sales+streaming figures based on certification alone.

=== For remix version ===
| Region | Certification | Certified units/sales |
|---|---|---|
| Australia (ARIA) | 11× Platinum | 770,000^{‡} |
| Brazil (Pro-Música Brasil) | Platinum | 60,000^{‡} |
| Canada (Music Canada) | Diamond | 800,000^{‡} |
| Denmark (IFPI Danmark) | 7× Platinum | 630,000^{‡} |
| Germany (BVMI) | Gold | 200,000^{‡} |
| Mexico (AMPROFON) | 5× Diamond+4× Platinum+Gold | 1,770,000^{‡} |
| New Zealand (RMNZ) | 4× Platinum | 120,000^{‡} |
| Norway (IFPI Norway) | 8× Platinum | 480,000^{‡} |
| Spain (Promusicae) | 12× Platinum | 480,000^{‡} |
| United Kingdom (BPI) | 7× Platinum | 4,200,000^{‡} |
| United States (RIAA) | 13× Platinum | 13,000,000^{‡} |
Streaming
| Japan (RIAJ) | Gold | 50,000,000^{†} |
| Sweden (GLF) | 13× Platinum | 104,000,000^{†} |
^{‡} Sales+streaming figures based on certification alone.^{†} Streaming-only figures based on certification alone.

== See also ==
- List of best-selling Latin singles
- List of best-selling singles
- List of best-selling singles in Australia
- List of best-selling singles in Germany
- List of best-selling singles in Italy
- List of best-selling singles in Spain
- List of best-selling singles in the United Kingdom
- List of best-selling singles in the United States
- List of Billboard Hot 100 chart achievements and milestones
- List of Billboard Hot Latin Songs chart achievements and milestones
- List of number-one singles of 2017 (Australia)
- List of number-one hits of 2017 (Austria)
- List of Ultratop 50 number-one singles of 2017
- List of Canadian Hot 100 number-one singles of 2017
- List of number-one hits of 2017 (Denmark)
- List of number-one singles of 2017 (Finland)
- List of number-one hits of 2017 (France)
- List of number-one hits of 2017 (Germany)
- List of number-one singles of the 2010s (Hungary)
- List of number-one singles of 2017 (Ireland)
- List of number-one hits of 2017 (Italy)
- List of number-one songs of 2017 (Malaysia)
- List of Billboard Mexico Airplay number ones
- List of Dutch Top 40 number-one singles of 2017
- List of number-one singles from the 2010s (New Zealand)
- List of number-one songs in Norway
- List of number-one singles of 2017 (Portugal)
- List of Scottish Singles number ones of 2017
- List of number-one singles of 2017 (Slovenia)
- List of number-one singles of 2017 (Spain)
- List of number-one singles of the 2010s (Sweden)
- List of number-one hits of 2017 (Switzerland)
- List of UK Singles Chart number ones of the 2010s
- List of Billboard Hot 100 number ones of 2017
- List of Billboard Hot 100 top-ten singles in 2017
- Billboard Year-End Hot 100 singles of 2017
- List of number-one digital songs of 2017 (U.S.)
- List of Billboard Hot Latin Songs and Latin Airplay number ones of 2017
- List of Billboard Hot Latin Songs and Latin Airplay number ones of 2018
- List of number-one dance airplay hits of 2017 (U.S.)
- List of Billboard Mainstream Top 40 number-one songs of 2017
- List of Radio Songs number ones of the 2010s
- List of number-one Billboard Streaming Songs of 2017
- List of most-streamed songs on Spotify
- List of most-liked YouTube videos
- List of most-viewed YouTube videos
