= La Bandononona Clave Nueva De Max Peraza =

Mexican banda group

La Bandononona Clave Nueva De Max Peraza is a Mexican banda group, formed in 2013, consisting of lead vocalist and founder Max Peraza and many other members.

== History ==
"Vida de Perros", was released as their debut single. It was followed by the second single "Al Estilo Mafia" which is a collaboration with singer Saúl "El Jaguar" Alarcon. In 2018, they released a banda version of the hit single "Despacito", together with the original artist, Luis Fonsi. The collaboration was first the idea of executives of Universal Music and the manager of the band. The song arrangement of the version was done by Joel Oliva.

Speaking about how the band was received in popular culture, Peraza stated "I never thought about this response from people, we have come to different public places and they recognize us, they ask us for photos and that for us is the best reward, really thank you very much."

In 2016, the single "Dime Como" was released as a single.

In December 2017, the band's bus was involved in an accident near the México-La Marquesa highway.

== Members ==
- Max Peraza (vocals)
- Alejandro Gastélum (vocals)
- Saúl López Tejada (harmony)
- Daniel Beltrán (harmony)
- Joel Ángulo Barranca (tuba)
- Orlando Velarde (drums)
- Eric Rodríguez Souza (percussion)

Additional members include three trumpeters, four clarinet players and three trombones players.
