= Dino D'Santiago =

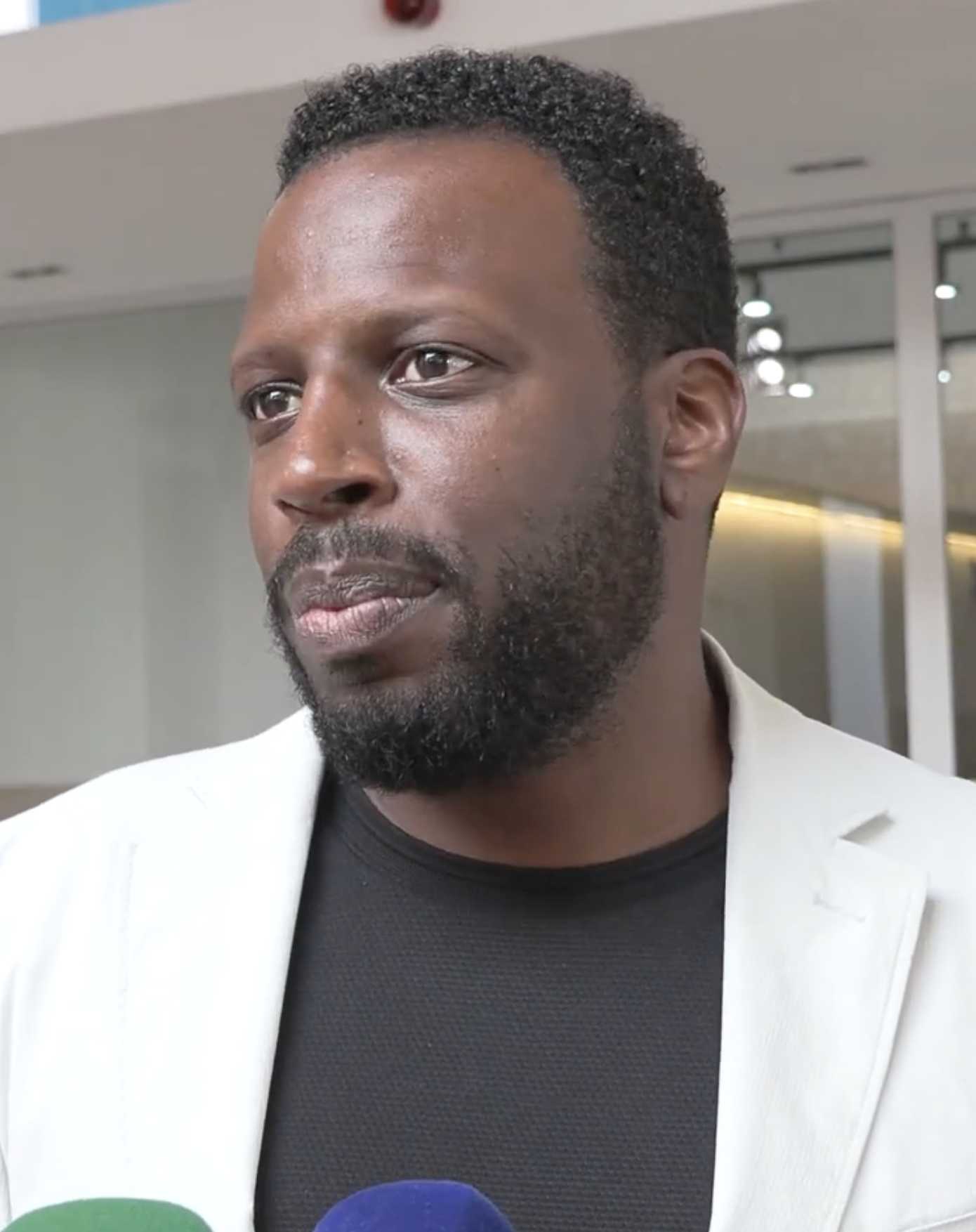
- D'Santiago in 2025

Background information
- Born: Claudino Jesus Borges Pereira; 13 December 1982 (age 43); Quarteira, Faro, Portugal
- Occupations: Singer, activist, composer
- Instrument: vocals
- Years active: 1990s–present

Claudino Jesus Borges Pereira, better known by his stage name Dino D'Santiago (born 13 December 1982), is a Portuguese activist, composer, and musician of Cape Verdean descent. First appearing in Operação Triunfo, he has released several albums, both with groups such as Expensive Soul and his project Nu Soul Family, as well as solo projects. He has won various awards from organizations such as Cabo Verde Music Awards and the MTV Europe Music Awards. He has also been featured on magazines such as GQ and the Rolling Stone.

== Early life ==
D’Santiago was born on 13 December 1982 in the freguesia of Quarteira, in the Algarve. The son of immigrants from the island of Santiago in Cape Verde, he was raised in Bairro dos Pescadores, an older bairro de lata in Quarteira, where his parents had moved to after arriving in Portugal. The neighborhood, which after the Carnation Revolution became the residence of various immigrants who came from the former Portuguese colonies, namely places such as Angola, Cape Verde, Guinea-Bissau, Mozambique, and São Tomé and Príncipe, began to be demolished in 1997. During this time, D'Santiago, at 15, moved to Bairro da Abelheira with his parents and siblings. At 21, he moved to Porto, where he stayed for 11 years, followed by a move to Lisbon, where he has been a resident of since then, while also visiting Santiago at various points.

== Career ==
D'Santiago's musical career began when he sang in the church choir while still a child, following the example of his parents, whom sang in choirs and whose rehearsals he helped write. In the 1990s, with the popularization of rap and hip-hop in Portugal, he was invited by local rappers in Bairro dos Pescadores to make hooks for their music. It was during this time period that he began to compose music.

D'Santiago became more well known in 2003 when he accompanied his friend Carla de Sousa to the casting session for the second edition of Operação Triunfo, and was recorded singing to one of the cameras. He was later asked by his friend at the time, rapper Virgul of Da Weasel fame, as to why he had not signed up for the session. He went to participate in the show, where he reached the final. As part of the session, he began singing music for the rap group Black Company and recorded some of his own original music. During his time on the set of Operação Triunfo, D'Santiago met Ludgero Rosas, who convinced him to change his artistic name. Afterwards, he became part of Jaguar Band. In 2008, he launched his first solo album under the name "Dino SoulMotion". He came to be known as Dino D'Santiago, the name he went by in Cape Verde. He made the name change as a homage to his parents' home country. After his participation on the show, D'Santiago dedicated himself to various hip-hop, R&B, and soul projects. He collaborated with groups such as Expensive Soul, for who he made choruses. At the end of the 2000s, he formed his own group, named "Dino & The SoulMotion", and integrated that with his project Nu Soul Family, which he had been a part of for 11 years to that point. With the project, he had collaborated with names such as Virgul.

While living in Lisbon, Madonna met D'Santiago, who introduced her to many local musicians playing fado, morna, and samba music. They regularly invited her to their "living room sessions", thus she was inspired to make her 14th studio album, Madame X.

He was part of the interval act for the final of Eurovision Song Contest 2018, held in Lisbon. He was joined by on stage with artists such as Branko, Sara Tavares, and Mayra Andrade, the other interval act featuring Caetano Veloso and 2017 winner Salvador Sobral. In 2019, he appeared at both NOS Primavera Sound 2019 and Super Bock Super Rock.

D'Santiago performed at The Jazz Cafe in London, United Kingdom in January 2020. In 2020, he participated as a composer at Festival da Canção 2020, composing the song Diz só, performed by Kady. The entry ultimately reached 5th place. During the George Floyd protests in 2020, he gave a performance at Campo Pequeno in Lisbon in solidarity with the Black Lives Matter movement.

In addition to his work, D'Santiago has also created the website Lisboa Criola, which, led by Bissau-Guinean activist and singer Karyna Gomes and in conjunction with the Portuguese online news organization Mensagem de Lisboa, created one of the first journalism projects to report in various types of Creole languages (in particular Cape Verdean and Guinean) in 2021. This project was one of 12 projects selected by the New Spectrum Fellowships program to receive a grant.

On the 50th anniversary of the beginning of the Carnation Revolution, D'Santiago gave a performance at São Bento Mansion to commemorate the occasion. In season 10, broadcast in 2022, he was a mentor on The Voice Portugal. He appeared at NOS Alive in 2022.

== Awards and distinctions ==
His project Nu Soul Family was awarded the Best Portuguese Artist award at the 2010 MTV Europe Music Awards. In 2011, with the song "O Amor É Mágico", Expensive Soul (which D'Santiago is a part of) won a Golden Globe for Best Song. In 2013, Expensive Soul won another Golden Globe for Best Group with Symphonic Experience. D'Santiago's 2013 debut solo album Eva was rated by the jury from the Europe World Music Charts as one of the best in the world in 2013. He won two prizes during the Cabo Verde Music Awards in 2014: Best Acoustic album for Eva and Best Batuko/Kola San Jon with the song Ka bu Tchora.

D'Santiago was the most awarded artist at the inaugural Portuguese Music Awards in 2019, winning the following awards: Best Solo Artist, Best Album, and Critics' Award. He was nominated for the same category again in 2020, this time for his solo projects. That same year, he was nominated Personality of the Year in the music category for the 5th edition of the Somos Cabo Verde awards. He was also declared one of the Men of The Year by GQ Portugal, and was also highlighted by Rolling Stone, becoming the first Portuguese artist to do so. In 2019, he was nominated for PALOP Male Artist during the 2019 African Entertainment Awards USA in Newark, New Jersey, USA. D'Santiago's album Eva is considered by the jury from the Europe World Music Charts as one of the best in the world.

In 2020, Portuguese magazine Blitz chose D'Santiago's album Kriola as the best of the year. He was awarded the Gold Medal of Honour by the Municipal Chamber of Loulé that year. He again became the most awarded artist during the Portuguese Music Awards, being awarded for: Best Male Artist, Best Album with Kriola and the Critics' Award. He was again nominated by the Golden Globes that year as well for Best Interpreter and Best Music, as well as being named as one of the most influential Black personalities in Portuguese-speaking countries on the PowerList100, created by Bantumen with support by various entities.

In 2022, he received the Best Interpreter award during the Globos de Ouro. He was named among the Most Influential People of African Descent in 2021 by MIPAD, with the support of the United Nations.

== Controversies ==
In October 2020, the magazine Sábado reported that a concert titled "Juntos Pelo Iémen" was held on 12 September 2020 at the Capitólio in Lisbon, which was meant to be a fundraising event to raise money for Doctors Without Borders in Yemen during the civil war. One of the organizers was Cláudia Semedo. In regards to the concert, the costs for hosting the concert had been five times more than the total amount of money raised. The Municipal Chamber of Lisbon, led by mayor Fernando Medina during this time period, awarded Semedo 10,000 Euros that were distributed to renowned artists, among them D'Santiago, who received a thousand Euros for the concert.

In September 2021, Sábado then revealed another case which involved members of the Lisbon municipal chamber and D'Santiago, where the singer was one of the artists that later would take part in the Honors' Commission of Medina's reelection campaign. While the campaign was underway, D'Santiago had been contracted to provide artistic services, including a performance which took place on 11 October 2018, taking place during ModaLisboa and which had a cost of 6,000 euros. This was during Medina's time in office, between 2015 and 2021.

However, the controversy for which D'Santiago and other artists had been the target of national discussion would arise in 2022 as the D'Santiago accepted to perform at that year's Avante! Festival. The event is associated with the Portuguese Communist Party (PCP), which was the only party in the Portuguese Parliament to not condemn the Russian invasion of Ukraine that year. As a response to criticism and pressure to not perform at the festival, D'Santiago defended his performance, which ultimately happened, criticizing what he pointed to as a trend on the part of Western countries to ignore wars and humanitarian crises that occur outside of Europe, such as that of Yemen's civil war and the subsequent humanitarian crisis.

== Select Discography ==
Among his discography are albums and songs such as:

=== Solo ===
- 2013 - Eva
- 2016 - Unplugged (live)
- 2019 - Mundu Nôbu
- 2019 - Sotavento
- 2020 - Kriola

=== As group member ===
- 2008 - Eu e os Meus, Dino & The Soul Motion, which included the participation of names such as Sam The Kid, Tito Paris, Valete, Pacman and Virgul of Da Weasel, among others.
- 2010 - Never Too Late to Dance, Nu Soul Family
- 2012 - Unconditional Love, Nu Soul Family

=== Producer and artistic director ===
- 2020 - À Moda Quarteirense

=== Participation in ===
- 2012 - Chamam-lhe Fado, Jorge Fernando album
- 2019 - Nosso, Branko album
- 2020 - Melodramático, HMB album
