= Os Quatro e Meia =

Portuguese musical group

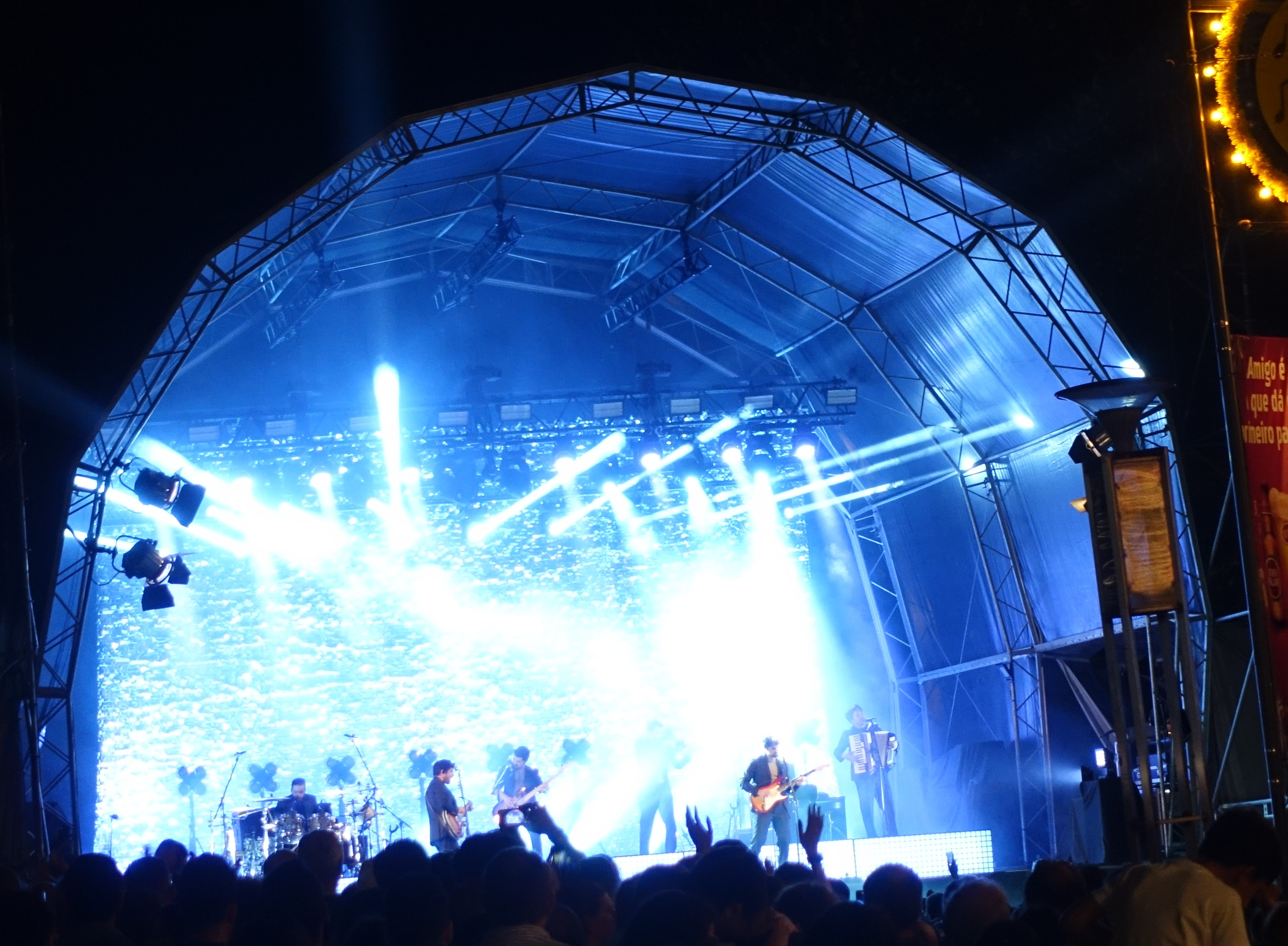
Concert in Braga

Os Quatro e Meia (loose translation: "The Four and a Half") are a band from Coimbra, Portugal. The band emerged in 2013, after a successful performance by a group of university students from Coimbra in a show to raise funds for a dance academy.

The group is currently composed of six elements: João Cristóvão (violin and mandolin), Mário Ferreira (accordion and voice), Pedro Figueiredo (percussion), Ricardo Almeida (voice and guitar), Rui Marques (double bass) and Tiago Nogueira (voice and guitar). All of them have, besides music, another profession: there are three doctors (Pedro, Ricardo and Tiago), a computer engineer (Mário), a civil engineer (Rui) and a music teacher (João). In 2017, the sextet started to achieve nationwide recognition and became one of the most famous bands in Portugal.

In 2023, they won a Golden Globe for Best Song of the Year.

== See also ==
- List of number-one albums of 2017 (Portugal)
- List of number-one albums of 2020 (Portugal)
