= Wet Bed Gang =

Portuguese hip hop group

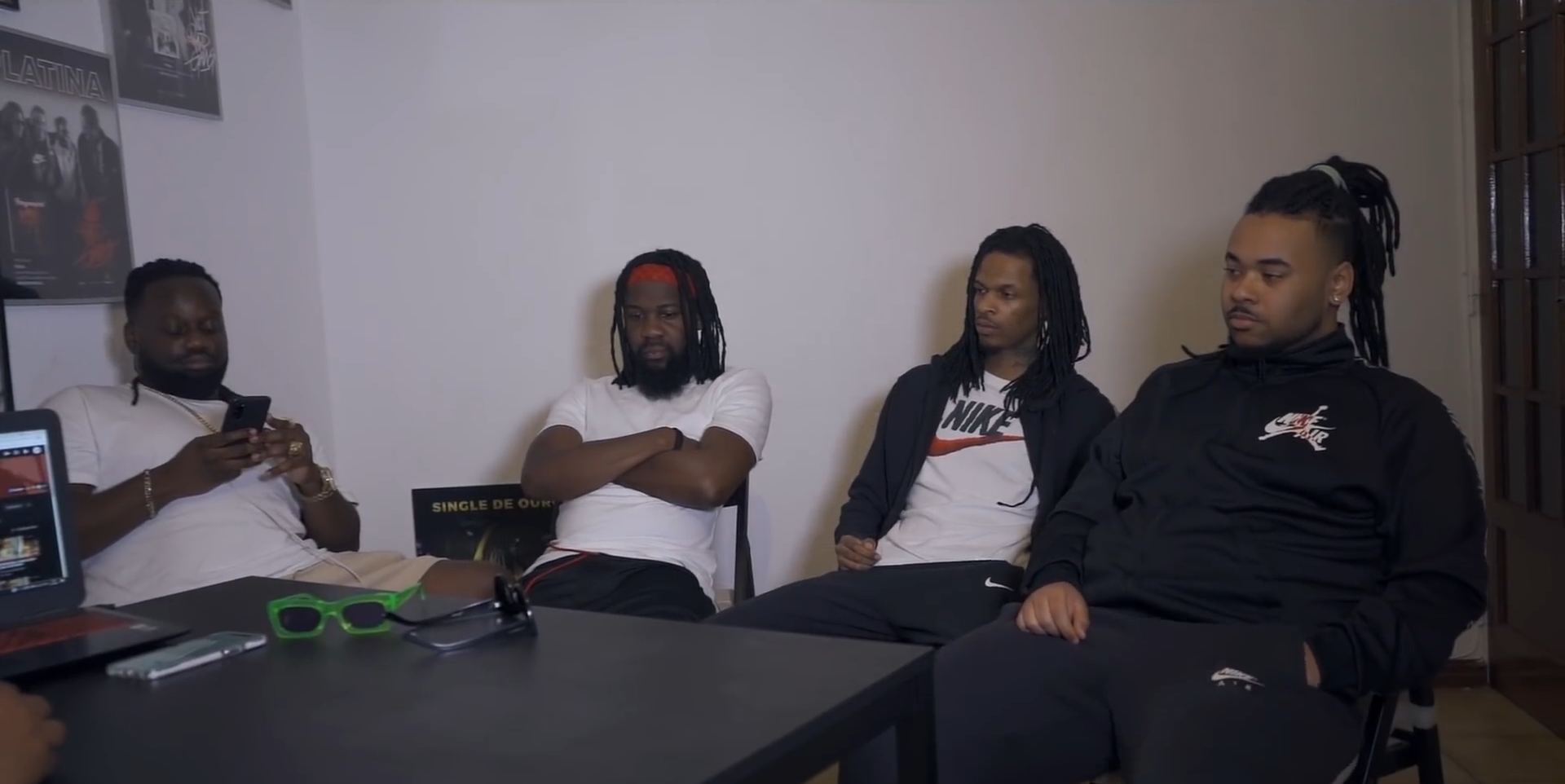
- Wet Bed Gang in 2021

Background information
- Origin: Portugal
- Genres: Rap, Hip Hop Tuga
- Years active: 2014–present
- Label: WBG Records
- Members: Gerson "Gson" Costa (2014–present); Lizandro "Zara G" Silva (2014–present); Tomás "Kroa" David (2014–present); Pedro "Zizzy Jr" Júnior (2014–present)

Wet Bed Gang is a Portuguese rap and hip hop tuga group from Vialonga. The group was formed in 2014 by João "La Bella Mafia" Rossi and Pizzy. The group consists of four Portuguese singers and rappers with the stage names Gson, Zara G, Kroa and Zizzy Jr. The group received national recognition after their songs gained millions of plays on YouTube and Spotify.

== Career ==
The group was co-founded by João "La Bella Mafia" Rossi and Pizzy in 2014. Following Rossi's death, the remaining members chose to continue with the development of the musical group. Their first extended play, called "Filhos do Rossi", or "Sons of Rossi" in English, was a tribute to the group's co-founder.

In August 2019, they performed at the Meo Sudoeste music festival.

=== É Tuga Ou Nada ===
One of the members of Wet Bed Gang, Gson was summoned by Sam The Kid to participate in the song "É Tuga Ou Nada", a wordplay twist from the Portuguese classical expression "é tudo ou nada" as a football anthem for the Portuguese national football men squad to support their campaign at the FIFA World Cup 2026. On 19 May 2026 the song is released alongside rappers Bispo, Sir Scratch and Papillon.

== Members ==
- Gerson "Gson" Costa
- Tomás "Kroa" David
- Lizandro "Zara G" Silva
- Pedro "Zizzy Jr" Júnior

== Awards ==
Year	Award	Nominee	Category	Result
2019	PLAY - Prémios da Música Portuguesa	Wet Bed Gang	Best Group	Nominated
2019	PLAY - Prémios da Música Portuguesa	"Devia Ir"	Vodafone Best Song	Nominated

== Discography ==
=== EPs ===
Title	Details
Filhos do Rossi	Released: 28 June 2017 (POR); Label: WBG Records
IV	Released: 21 February 2018 (POR); Label: WBG Records

=== Singles ===
List of singles, with selected details and chart positions
Title	Year	Peak chart positions	Certifications	Album
Title	Year	POR	Certifications	Album
"Já Passa"	2017	87		Filhos do Rossi
"Não Sinto"	2017	33	AFP: Platinum	Filhos do Rossi
"Aleluia"	2017	21		Non-album singles
"Mesa 8"	2018	—		Non-album singles
"Devia Ir"	2018	31	AFP: Diamond	Non-album singles
"23 de Maio"	2018	—		Non-album singles
"Bairro"	2019	1	AFP: 3× Platinum	Non-album singles
"Mais Caro"	2019	4	AFP: Platinum	Non-album singles
"Irresponsável"	2019	2	AFP: Platinum	Non-album singles
"Head na Glock"	2019	32		Non-album singles
"Depois da Chuva"	2019	15		Non-album singles
"La Bella Mafia"	2020	1	AFP: Platinum	Non-album singles
"Estrela Maior"	2023	37		Non-album singles
"—" denotes a recording that did not chart or was not released in that territory.

==== As featured artists ====
List of singles, with selected details and chart positions
Title	Year	Peak chart positions	Certifications	Album
Title	Year	POR	Certifications	Album
"Maluco" (Karetus featuring Wet Bed Gang)	2017	—		FDS
"Young Forever" (Jimmy P featuring Wet Bed Gang & Suaveyouknow)	2018	—		Alcateia
"—" denotes a recording that did not chart or was not released in that territory.

==== With Zara G as lead artist ====
List of singles, with selected details and chart positions
Title	Year	Peak chart positions	Certifications	Album
Title	Year	POR	Certifications	Album
"Não Tens Visto" (with Gson)	2016	57	AFP: Platinum	Filhos do Rossi
"Chaminé"	2018	31		IV
"—" denotes a recording that did not chart or was not released in that territory.

==== With Gson as lead artist ====
List of singles, with selected details and chart positions
Title	Year	Peak chart positions	Certifications	Album
Title	Year	POR	Certifications	Album
"Voar"	2018	58		IV
"—" denotes a recording that did not chart or was not released in that territory.
