= Expensive Soul =

Portuguese musical duo

- Origin: Leça da Palmeira, Portugal
- Genres: Hip hop; soul; R&B
- Years active: 1999-present
- Labels: New Max Records
- Members: Demo; New Max

Expensive Soul is a Portuguese soul and hip-hop duo formed in Leça da Palmeira in 1999, consisting of Demo (António Conde) as the group's MC and New Max (Tiago Novo) as its singer, MC and producer. Expensive Soul's musical style incorporates various genres, ranging from reggae to R&B. From their second album, named Alma Cara (2006), to these days, their music possesses a highly organic component. They were specially popular in Portugal from 2004 to 2014.

The group released their debut album, B.I., in 2004, with which they rose to mainstream prominence. Some of their most famous songs have been featured in Portuguese telenovelas, such as the track "O Amor É Mágico" (which samples The Impressions' 1974 song I'll Always Be Here) from their third album, 2010's Utopia. Other famous tracks include "Dou-te Nada" (2010) and "Cúpido" (2013). So far, Expensive Soul has released five studio albums, one live album and one live DVD, with a show that was part of the Guimarães 2012 - European Capital of Culture programming.

== Formation and early years ==
Tiago Novo and António Conde attended the same class in high school in Leça da Palmeira, Matosinhos. The duo started their project Expensive Soul in 1999, adopting, in the process, the artistic names New Max and Demo. Their debut album B.I., released in 2004, features the singles "Eu Não Sei" - the band's breakthrough hit - and "Falas Disso", which were included in the popular teen telenovela Morangos com Açúcar. "Eu Não Sei"'s success made the group known to the general public.

In their live performances, the duo is accompanied by the instrumental ensemble Jaguar Band; New Max has been described as the most reserved half of the duo, whereas Demo has been noted to exude a "natural magnetism" and a more energetic approach to their shows.

Acclaimed singer Dino d'Santiago was part of Jaguar Band. He was one of the back vocalists of the band. He also appeared in Expensive Soul's first music video ever, for the hit "Eu Não Sei", before he became famous.

== Discography ==
=== Albums ===
- B.I. (CD, 2004)
- Alma Cara (CD, 2006)
- Utopia (CD, 2010)
- Sonhador (CD, 2014)
- A Arte das Musas (CD, 2019)

=== Live albums ===
- Ao Vivo Nos Coliseus (2016)

=== DVDs ===
- Expensive Soul Symphonic Experience (DVD, 2012)
