= Aldina Duarte =

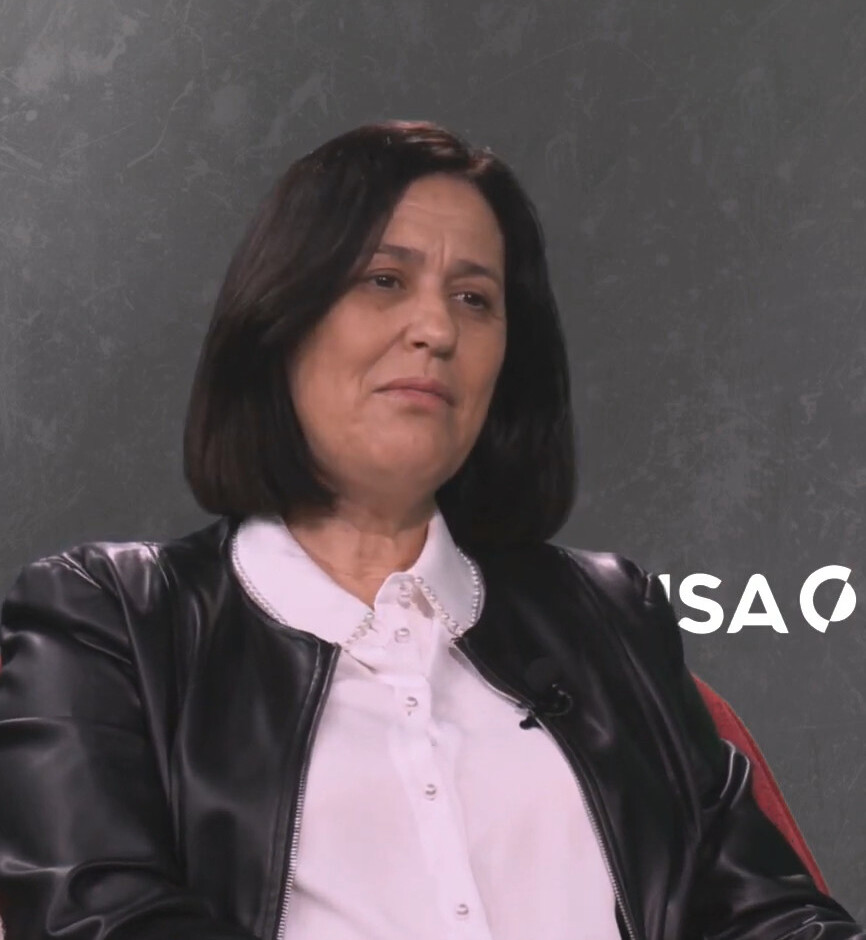
- Aldina Duarte in 2024

Background information
- Born: Aldina Maria Miguel Duarte; July 22, 1967 (age 58); Lisbon, Portugal
- Genres: Fado
- Occupations: singer; lyricist; researcher
- Spouse: Camané (divorced)

Aldina Maria Miguel Duarte (born 22 July 1967) is a Portuguese fado singer, lyricist, and researcher. She has dedicated herself to the traditional Fado repertoire, having been described as a "hardcore fadista". Many fadistas have sung her lyrics, including Camané, Joana Amendoeira, António Zambujo, Pedro Moutinho, and Mariza.

== Life and work ==
Duarte was born in Lisbon, where she grew up in the social housing projects at Chelas, during the Estado Novo dictatorship. Her father left to fight in the colonial war, and died when she was 3 years old, never having returned home. Her mother raised her as a single mother with great privations. In an interview, Duarte described her childhood as "having no space for joy": "Fascism was the great event of my early childhood. My childhood was sad, cruel, because where there is no food to eat, there is no comfort, there is no respect. That determines everything".

Fado did not play a part in her young adult life. She worked in different jobs, including at a newspaper and at a radio station. At some point, she was an instructor on a professional training program at a cerebral palsy centre. She sang on a pop music group called Valdez e as Piranhas Douradas but didn't pursue singing professionally. She also collaborated with the Comuna — Teatro de Pesquisa theatre troupe where she was responsible for organizing their Fado Nights.

"Antes de quê?" (0:50)
Aldina Duarte singing "Antes de quê?" at the Folio Festival 2017

When Aldina Duarte was 24 years old, she entered a traditional Lisbon fado house in Bairro Alto intending to interview Beatriz da Conceição, which she was asked to do by Jorge Silva Melo, who was working on a documentary. Conceição's singing deeply impressed her and was the reason for her sudden and overwhelming interest in fado. She later said: "I fell in love with everything I heard. I asked her for advice. She talked to me about all the important things in fado. I wanted to be a fadista. I spent many days listening to fado records, many nights listening to many fadistas, many months reading and memorising poems". She dedicated herself entirely to fado, listening to dozens of recordings, memorizing dozens of lyrics, working on research, talking to fadistas, and formming her own repertoire.

Duarte married fadista Camané, and worked by his side, selecting a great part of his repertoire and writing lyrics for him to sing. She also worked on the same kind of repertoire-building research for fadista Joana Amendoeira. In addition to working with these fadistas, she worked for record label EMI-Valentim de Carvalho on research, organizing compilations dedicated to Raul Ferrão and Alfredo Marceneiro, among others.

Aldina Duarte sang fado publicly for the first time at the cerebral palsy centre at which she worked; and, in 1992, she sang the fado Rua do Capelão on the film Xavier, directed by Manuel Mozos. The performance was recorded in a street in the traditional neighbourhood of Mouraria, and the local residents applauded so intensely she had to sing an encore.

From 1995 to 1996 she sang at the fado house Clube de Fado, at guitarist Mário Pacheco's invitation. From 1997, she started singing at Sr. Vinho, a fado house owned by fadista Maria da Fé.

She recorded her first album, Apenas o amor, at the age of 37. She wrote the lyrics for most of the tracks herself. The album was well received by the critics, who celebrated both her singing and her poetry.

In 2006 she released her second album, Crua. In this album, all tracks were traditional fados with lyrics by João Monge.

Duarte was the subject of a documentary released in 2009, Aldina Duarte: Princesa Prometida, directed by Manuel Mozos.

== Personal life ==
For 10 years she was married to fellow fadista Camané.

== Discography ==
- Apenas o amor (2004)
- Crua (2006)
- Contos de fados (2011)
- Romance(s) (2015)
- Quando se ama loucamente (2017)
- Roubados (2019)
- Mulheres ao espelho
- Metade metade

== Filmography ==
- Aldina Duarte: Princesa Prometida (2009)
