= Camané =

Portuguese fado singer (born 1966)

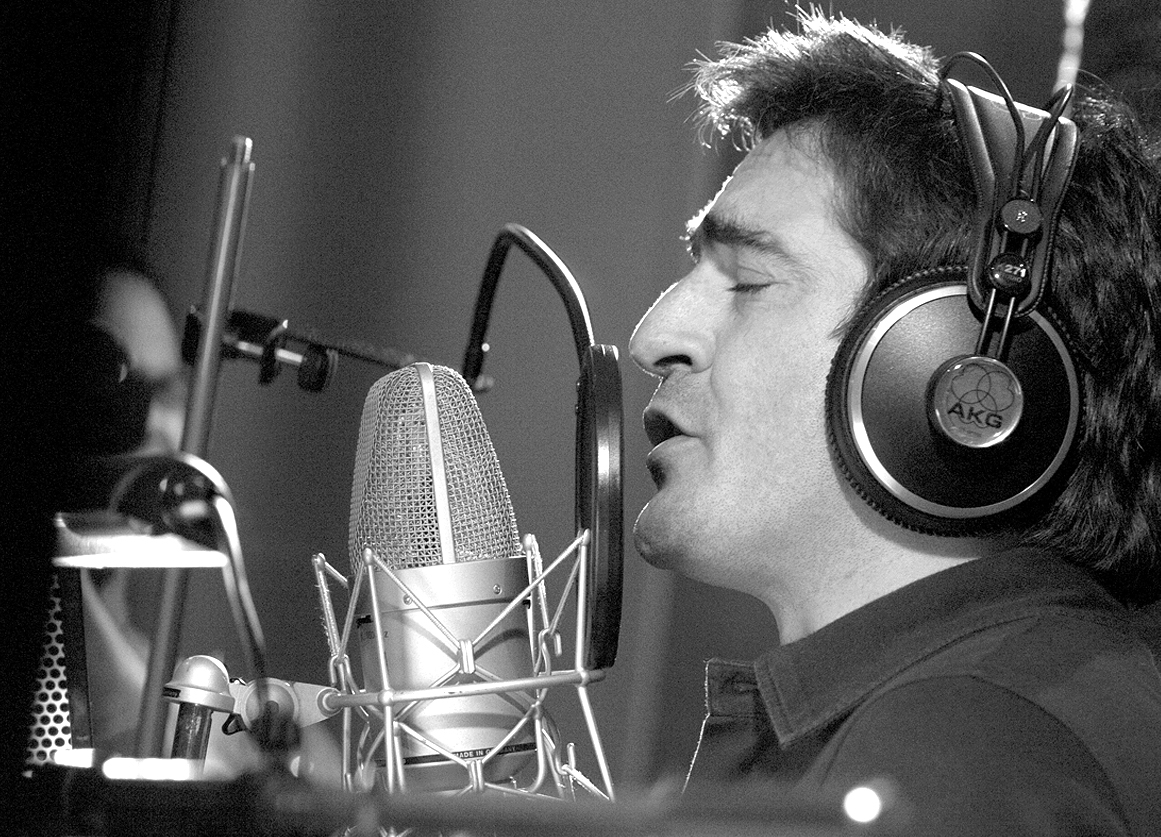
- Camané in 2014

Background information
- Birth name: Carlos Manuel Moutinho Paiva dos Santos Duarte
- Born: 20 December 1966 (age 58); Oeiras, Portugal
- Genres: Fado
- Occupation: Musician
- Instrument: Vocals
- Website: camane.com

Carlos Manuel Moutinho Paiva dos Santos Duarte (born 20 December 1966), known professionally as Camané, is a Portuguese fado singer.

== Career ==
He started gaining recognition in Portugal in 1979 after winning the 'Grande Noite do Fado' (Great Fado Night). After this first step, he continued to consistently work toward commercial success with critically well-received albums and a concert tour that touched upon both large and small venues, including 'Casas de Fado' (fado clubs) in Lisbon.

He has released six million-selling albums: Uma Noite de Fados (1995), Na Linha da Vida (1998) marking the beginning of three records produced by José Mário Branco, Esta Coisa da Alma (2000), Pelo Dia Dentro (2001), Como sempre... Como dantes (live in 2003), and Sempre De Mim (2008). These have been released in several European and Asian countries.

== Personal life ==
Camané was married to Aldina Duarte, also a fado singer.

== Discography ==
=== Albums ===
- Uma Noite de Fados (1995)
- Na Linha da Vida (1998)
- Esta Coisa da Alma (2000)
- Pelo Dia Dentro (2001)
- Como sempre... Como dantes (live) (2003)
- DVD – Ao vivo no São Luíz (2006)
- Sempre de Mim (Edição Especial Limitada CD+DVD) (2008)
- Do Amor e dos Dias (2010)
- O Melhor 1995–2013 (Compilation, Double CD) (2013)
- Infinito Presente (2015)
- Canta Marceneiro (2017)

=== Collaborations ===
- Camané & Mário Laginha – Aqui Está-Se Sossegado (2019)
