= The Voice Kids (Portuguese TV series) season 4 =

The Voice Kids
- Season 4
- Hosted by: Catarina Furtado; Catarina Maia (backstage)
- Coaches: Aurea; Carlão; Bárbara Tinoco; Fernando Daniel
- No. of contestants: 60
- Winner: Júlia Machado
- Winning coach: Fernando Daniel
- Runners-up: Francisco Horta; Francisco Santos

Release
- Original network: RTP1
- Original release: 9 April – 25 June 2023

Season chronology
- ← Previous; Season 3 Next → Season 5

The fourth season of Portuguese The Voice Kids is a talent show broadcast on RTP1, which premiered on 9 April 2023. Carlão and Fernando Daniel returned for their third seasons as coaches, while Bárbara Tinoco returned for her second. In the meantime, Carolina Deslandes was replaced by former The Voice Portugal coach, Aurea. Catarina Furtado continues to host the show, however, Fábio Lopes was replaced by Catarina Maia as the backstage presenter.

Júlia Machado won the competition, marking Fernando Daniel's third consecutive win as a coach. Machado's victory makes Daniel the only coach in all versions of the Portuguese show to win three consecutive seasons. Additionally, her victory marks the second time a stolen artist has won The Voice Kids. The first time this occurred was with Simão Oliveira's victory, who was also from Team Fernando, in the second season. Just like in the previous two seasons, The Voice Kids was the program used to select the Portuguese artist that would represent the country in the Junior Eurovision Song Contest 2023.

== Coaches ==
Coaches of The Voice Kids season 4

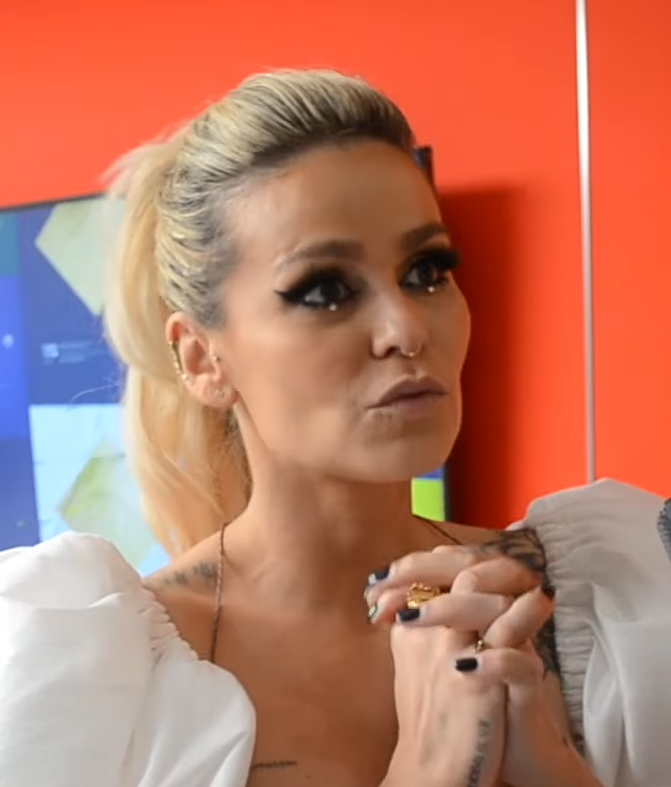
Aurea

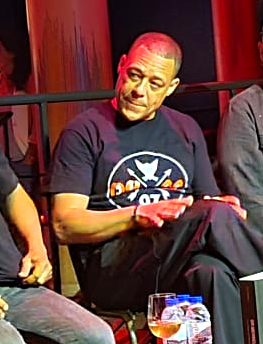
Carlão

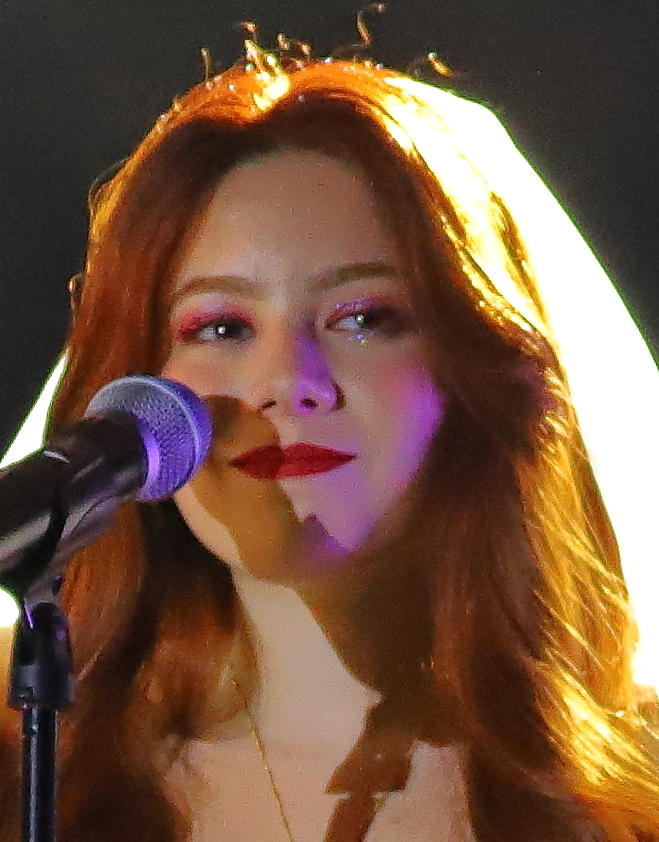
Bárbara Tinoco

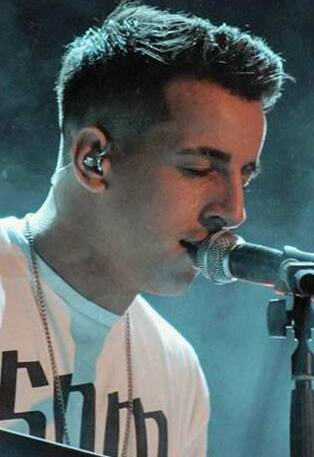
Fernando Daniel

Fernando Daniel, Carlão and Bárbara Tinoco returned from last season, with The Voice of Portugal coach, Aurea, replacing Carolina Deslandes.

== Teams ==
Colour key

- Winner
- Runner-up
- Third place
- Eliminated in the Live shows
- Stolen by another coach in the Battles
- Eliminated in Battles

Coaching teams
| Coaches | Top 60 Artists | | | | | |
|---|---|---|---|---|---|---|
| Aurea | | | | | | |
| Aurea | Maria Pedro | Carolina Quintas | Francisco Bessa | Yasmin Alicia | Santiago Hassam | Vicente Oliveira |
| Aurea | ~~Isabel Silva~~ | ~~Júlia Machado~~ | Érica Bernardo | Francisca Carvalho | Íris Bispo | Joana Almeida |
| Aurea | Laura Rodrigues | Maria Carolina | Mariana Baquero | Rita Torres | | |
| Carlão | | | | | | |
| Carlão | Francisco Horta | Francisco Santos | Isabel Silva | Luísa Mascarenhas | Lucas Machado | Tatiana Francisco |
| Carlão | ~~Sofia Silva~~ | Alícia Espírito Santo | Beatriz Sá | Costa Bernardo | Diogo Lopes | Gustavo Carvalho |
| Carlão | Leandro Soares | Marco Costa | Sara Pereira | Vicente Pé Neves | | |
| Bárbara Tinoco | | | | | | |
| Bárbara Tinoco | Rodrigo Oliveira | Martim d'Aires | Rodrigo Rosa | Sofia Silva | Lavínia Guimarães | Maria Leonor Pereira |
| Bárbara Tinoco | Alice Santos | Ana Mar Silva | Bárbara Gonçalves | Beatriz Dias | Daniela Coutinho | Maria Rocchi |
| Bárbara Tinoco | Mariana Maia | Matilde Batista | Sara Fernandes | Violeta Cunha | | |
| Fernando Daniel | | | | | | |
| Fernando Daniel | Júlia Machado | Matilde Abreu | Francisca Rodrigues | Valéria Guba | Eva Alves | Miguel Abreu |
| Fernando Daniel | ~~Santiago Hassam~~ | Alexandra Costa | Bruna Oliveira | Catarina Nogueira | Diego Lopes | Dinis Vieira |
| Fernando Daniel | Laura Bandeira | Lourenço Marques | Madalena Teixeira | Marlene Novais | | |
Note: Italicized names are stolen artists (names scratched through within former teams).

== Blind auditions ==
Same as the previous season, in the blind auditions (Provas Cegas), each coach was given two blocks to use and prevent another coach from pitching for the artist. The block buttons could be used at any time. At the end of the blind auditions, Carlão did not use his second block.

Blind auditions colour key
| ✔ | Coach pressed the "EU QUERO" button |
| | Artist joined this coach's team |
| | Artist was eliminated with no coach pressing their button |
| ✘ | Coach presed the button "EU QUERO", but was blocked: |
| | Blocked by Aurea; Blocked by Carlão; Blocked by Bárbara; Blocked by Fernando |

=== Episode 1 (9 April) ===
First episode's results
| Order | Artist | Age | Song | Coach's and artist's choices | | | |
| Order | Artist | Age | Song | Aurea | Carlão | Bárbara | Fernando |
|---|---|---|---|---|---|---|---|
| 1 | Mariana Maia | 9 | "Por um Triz" | ✔ | ✔ | ✔ | ✔ |
| 2 | Miguel Abreu | 12 | "Desfolhada portuguesa" | ✔ | ✔ | — | ✔ |
| 3 | Júlia Machado | 12 | "Part of Your World" | ✔ | ✔ | — | ✔ |
| 4 | Mafalda Portelada | 10 | "Nem às Paredes Confesso" | — | — | — | — |
| 5 | Sara Pereira | 13 | "Seven Nation Army" | ✔ | ✔ | ✔ | ✔ |
| 6 | Francisco Bessa | 13 | "All of Me" | ✔ | ✔ | — | — |
| 7 | Matilde André | 10 | "Easy on Me" | — | — | — | — |
| 8 | Maria Pedro | 14 | "Não Faz Mal Não Estar Bem" | ✔ | ✔ | ✘ | ✔ |
| 9 | Vicente Pé Neves | 12 | "Love in the Dark" | — | ✔ | — | ✔ |
| 10 | Diego Lopes | 10 | "Bella ciao" | — | — | ✔ | ✔ |
| 11 | Rodrigo Jordão | 11 | "Que o Amor te Salve nesta Noite Escura" | — | — | — | — |
| 12 | Maria Rocchi | 11 | "Castle on the Cloud" | ✔ | ✔ | ✔ | ✔ |
| 13 | Lucas Machado | 12 | "Rise Up" | ✔ | ✔ | ✔ | ✘ |

=== Episode 2 (16 April) ===
Second episode's results
| Order | Artist | Age | Song | Coach's and artist's choices | | | |
| Order | Artist | Age | Song | Aurea | Carlão | Bárbara | Fernando |
|---|---|---|---|---|---|---|---|
| 1 | Beatriz Jota | 11 | "Arcade" | — | — | — | — |
| 2 | Vicente Oliveira | 12 | "Andorinhas" | ✔ | ✔ | ✔ | — |
| 3 | Tatiana Francisco | 14 | "Wicked Game" | ✔ | ✔ | ✔ | ✔ |
| 4 | Gustavo Reis | 13 | "Canoas do Tejo" | — | — | — | — |
| 5 | Eva Alves | 14 | "Voilà" | ✔ | ✔ | ✔ | ✔ |
| 6 | Bruna Oliveira | 14 | "Stay" | — | — | — | ✔ |
| 7 | Martim d'Aires | 14 | "Zorro" | ✔ | ✔ | ✔ | — |
| 8 | Inês Silva | 9 | "Eu Sei" | — | — | — | — |
| 9 | Sofia Silva | 14 | "Fly Me to the Moon" | ✔ | ✔ | — | — |
| 10 | Lavínia Guimarães | 13 | "Creep" | ✘ | ✔ | ✔ | ✔ |
| 11 | Francisca Bastos | 8 | "Não me Importo" | — | — | — | — |
| 12 | Santiago Hassam | 12 | "Lua" | — | ✔ | — | ✔ |
| 13 | Matilde Abreu | 10 | "Canção do Mar" | — | ✔ | — | ✔ |
| 14 | Diogo Serrano | 10 | "Ele e Ela" | — | — | — | — |
| 15 | Joana Almeida | 13 | "Never Enough" | ✔ | ✔ | ✔ | ✔ |

=== Episode 3 (23 April) ===
Third episode's results
| Order | Artist | Age | Song | Coach's and artist's choices | | | |
| Order | Artist | Age | Song | Aurea | Carlão | Bárbara | Fernando |
|---|---|---|---|---|---|---|---|
| 1 | Carolina Quintas | 14 | "Liability" | ✔ | ✔ | ✔ | ✔ |
| 2 | Francisca Rodrigues | 14 | "Ficamos por Aqui" | ✔ | ✔ | — | ✔ |
| 3 | Leonor Pires | 12 | "Menina Estás à Janela" | — | — | — | — |
| 4 | Isabel Silva | 14 | "Drivers License" | ✔ | ✔ | ✔ | ✘ |
| 5 | Leandro Soares | 11 | "Eu Gosto de Ti" | ✔ | ✔ | — | — |
| 6 | Cora & Nara | 10 / 8 | "Trevo (Tu)" | — | — | — | — |
| 7 | Bárbara Gonçalves | 13 | "abcdefu" | ✔ | ✔ | ✔ | ✔ |
| 8 | Marco Costa | 13 | "Chuva" | — | ✔ | — | — |
| 9 | Matilde Martins | 8 | "Cidade" | — | — | — | — |
| 10 | Sara Fernandes | 13 | "Nothing Breaks Like a Heart" | ✔ | — | ✔ | — |
| 11 | Lourenço Marques | 14 | "Dezembro" | ✔ | ✔ | — | ✔ |
| 12 | Rita Oliveira | 13 | "Rosa Sangue" | — | — | — | — |
| 13 | Valéria Guba | 13 | "Idontwannabeyouanymore" | ✔ | ✔ | ✘ | ✔ |
| 14 | Francisco Horta | 14 | "A Roupa do Marinheiro" | ✔ | ✔ | ✔ | ✔ |

=== Episode 4 (30 April) ===
Fourth episode's results
| Order | Artist | Age | Song | Coach's and artist's choices | | | |
| Order | Artist | Age | Song | Aurea | Carlão | Bárbara | Fernando |
|---|---|---|---|---|---|---|---|
| 1 | Violeta Cunha | 9 | "Lusitana Paixão" | ✔ | — | ✔ | — |
| 2 | Mariana Baquero | 14 | "Tuyo" | ✔ | ✔ | — | — |
| 3 | Laura Rodrigues | 14 | "People Help the People" | ✔ | ✔ | ✔ | ✔ |
| 4 | Bianca Fonseca | 11 | "Portas do Sol" | — | — | — | — |
| 5 | Costa Bernardo | 13 | "Et Bam" | — | ✔ | — | — |
| 6 | Alícia Espírito Santo | 13 | "Chamar a Música" | — | ✔ | — | ✔ |
| 7 | Beatriz Nascimento | 10 | "Olá Solidão" | — | — | — | — |
| 8 | Ana Mar Silva | 13 | "As It Was" | — | — | ✔ | — |
| 9 | Guilherme Nunes | 13 | "Times Like These" | — | — | — | — |
| 10 | Marlene Novais | 13 | "Halo" | ✔ | ✔ | ✔ | ✔ |
| 11 | Rita Torres | 10 | "I Didn't Mean It" | ✔ | — | — | — |
| 12 | Mariana Inácio | 14 | "City of Stars" | — | — | — | — |
| 13 | Dinis Vieira | 13 | "Someone like You" | — | ✔ | — | ✔ |
| 14 | Sarah Pacheco | 10 | "Mais ou Menos Isto" | — | — | — | — |
| 15 | Yasmin Alicia | 14 | "Writing's on the Wall" | ✔ | ✔ | ✔ | ✘ |

=== Episode 5 (7 May) ===
Fifth episode's results
| Order | Artist | Age | Song | Coach's and artist's choices | | | |
| Order | Artist | Age | Song | Aurea | Carlão | Bárbara | Fernando |
|---|---|---|---|---|---|---|---|
| 1 | Érica Bernardo | 12 | "When I Was Your Man" | ✔ | ✔ | — | — |
| 2 | Francisca Carvalho | 13 | "Traitor" | ✔ | — | — | — |
| 3 | María Leonor Melo | 11 | "Onde Vais" | — | — | — | — |
| 4 | Gustavo Carvalho | 14 | "Another Love" | — | ✔ | — | ✔ |
| 5 | Beatriz Dias | 10 | "All I Want" | — | ✔ | ✔ | — |
| 6 | Catarina Lopes | 13 | "In The Stars" | — | — | — | — |
| 7 | Alice Santos | 11 | "Nuvem" | ✔ | ✔ | ✔ | ✔ |
| 8 | Beatriz Sá | 13 | "Hallelujah" | — | ✔ | — | — |
| 9 | Inês Carvalho | 12 | "You Are the Reason" | — | — | — | — |
| 10 | Alexandra Costa | 13 | "Lovely" | — | ✔ | ✔ | ✔ |
| 11 | Francisco Santos | 13 | "Leva-me a Viajar" | — | ✔ | — | — |
| 12 | Helena Borges | 13 | "Satellite" | — | — | — | — |
| 13 | Beatriz Trindade | 12 | "Everything I Wanted" | — | — | — | — |
| 14 | Luísa Mascarenhas | 13 | "I Love You" | ✔ | ✔ | ✘ | ✔ |

=== Episode 6 (14 May) ===
Sixth episode's results
| Order | Artist | Age | Song | Coach's and artist's choices | | | |
| Order | Artist | Age | Song | Aurea | Carlão | Bárbara | Fernando |
|---|---|---|---|---|---|---|---|
| 1 | Francisca Xavier | 9 | "Não me Importo" | — | — | — | — |
| 2 | Rodrigo Oliveira | 13 | "Before You Go" | — | ✔ | ✔ | ✔ |
| 3 | Madalena Teixeira | 12 | "Mar Salgado" | — | ✔ | — | ✔ |
| 4 | Lara Henriques | 13 | "Sei Lá" | — | — | — | — |
| 5 | Íris Bispo | 13 | "Antes Dela Dizer que Sim" | ✔ | — | — | — |
| 6 | Daniela Coutinho | 11 | "Chamada Não Atendida" | — | — | ✔ | — |
| 7 | Maria Leonor Pereira | 10 | "Para os Braços da Minha Mãe" | — | — | ✔ | — |
| 8 | Maria Carolina | 11 | "Glimpse of Us" | ✔ | ✔ | — | — |
| 9 | Sofia Cardoso | 14 | "Always Remember Us This Way" | Team full | — | — | — |
| 10 | Rodrigo Rosa | 12 | "All I Want" | Team full | ✔ | ✔ | ✔ |
| 11 | Matilde Campos | 9 | "Se Eu" | Team full | — | — | — |
| 12 | Laura Bandeira | 12 | "Talvez" | Team full | ✔ | — | ✔ |
| 13 | Matilde Batista | 13 | "Naked" | Team full | — | ✔ | — |
| 14 | Margarida Cardoso | 14 | "Melhor de Mim" | Team full | — | Team full | — |
| 15 | Catarina Nogueira | 11 | "Melodia da Saudade" | Team full | — | Team full | ✔ |
| 16 | Diogo Lopes | 9 | "Nesta Noite Branca" | Team full | ✔ | Team full | Team full |

== Battles ==
In the battles (Batalhas), each coach can steal one losing artist from another team battle.

Battles colour key
| Artist won the battle and advanced to the live shows |
| Artist lost the battle, but was stolen by another coach and advanced to the live shows |
| Artist lost the battle and was eliminated |

=== Episode 7 (21 May) ===
Seventh episode's results
| Order | Coach | Winner | Songs | Losers | 'Steal' results | | | |
| Order | Coach | Winner | Songs | Losers | Aurea | Carlão | Bárbara | Fernando |
|---|---|---|---|---|---|---|---|---|
| 1 | Aurea | Carolina Quintas | "Bloody Mary" | Laura Rodrigues | N/A | — | — | — |
| 1 | Aurea | Carolina Quintas | "Bloody Mary" | Isabel Silva | N/A | ✔ | — | — |
| 2 | Carlão | Francisco Santos | "Para mim Tanto me Faz" | Vicente Pé Neves | — | Steal used | — | — |
| 2 | Carlão | Francisco Santos | "Para mim Tanto me Faz" | Diogo Lopes | — | Steal used | — | — |
| 3 | Fernando | Francisca Rodrigues | "Because You Loved Me" | Madalena Teixeira | — | Steal used | — | N/A |
| 3 | Fernando | Francisca Rodrigues | "Because You Loved Me" | Marlene Novaes | — | Steal used | — | N/A |
| 4 | Bárbara | Martim d'Aires | "Não Há Estrelas no Céu" | Alice Santos | — | Steal used | N/A | — |
| 4 | Bárbara | Martim d'Aires | "Não Há Estrelas no Céu" | Violeta Cunha | — | Steal used | N/A | — |
| 5 | Carlão | Tatiana Francisco | "You Are the Reason" | Costa Bernardo | — | Steal used | — | — |
| 5 | Carlão | Tatiana Francisco | "You Are the Reason" | Gustavo Carvalho | — | Steal used | — | — |
| 6 | Aurea | Vicente Oliveira | "Mamma Mia" | Rita Torres | N/A | Steal used | — | — |
| 6 | Aurea | Vicente Oliveira | "Mamma Mia" | Maria Carolina | N/A | Steal used | — | — |
| 7 | Fernando | Miguel Abreu | "Foi Feitiço" | Diego Lopes | — | Steal used | — | N/A |
| 7 | Fernando | Miguel Abreu | "Foi Feitiço" | Lourenço Marques | — | Steal used | — | N/A |
| 8 | Bárbara | Rodrigo Oliveira | "Anti-Hero" | Bárbara Gonçalves | — | Steal used | N/A | — |
| 8 | Bárbara | Rodrigo Oliveira | "Anti-Hero" | Ana Mar Silva | — | Steal used | N/A | — |
| 9 | Aurea | Yasmin Alicia | "Beautiful" | Joana Almeida | N/A | Steal used | — | — |
| 9 | Aurea | Yasmin Alicia | "Beautiful" | Júlia Machado | N/A | Steal used | — | ✔ |

=== Episode 8 (28 May) ===
Eighth episode's results
| Order | Coach | Winner | Songs | Losers | 'Steal' results | | | |
| Order | Coach | Winner | Songs | Losers | Aurea | Carlão | Bárbara | Fernando |
|---|---|---|---|---|---|---|---|---|
| 1 | Carlão | Francisco Horta | "Casa" | Marco Costa | — | Steal used | — | Steal used |
| 1 | Carlão | Francisco Horta | "Casa" | Leandro Soares | — | Steal used | — | Steal used |
| 2 | Fernando | Eva Alves | "Somewhere Only We Know" | Catarina Nogueira | — | Steal used | — | Steal used |
| 2 | Fernando | Eva Alves | "Somewhere Only We Know" | Santiago Hassam | ✔ | Steal used | — | Steal used |
| 3 | Bárbara | Maria Leonor Pereira | "Saia da Carolina" | Daniela Coutinho | Steal used | Steal used | N/A | Steal used |
| 3 | Bárbara | Maria Leonor Pereira | "Saia da Carolina" | Mariana Maia | Steal used | Steal used | N/A | Steal used |
| 4 | Aurea | Maria Pedro | "Fix You" | Francisca Carvalho | Steal used | Steal used | — | Steal used |
| 4 | Aurea | Maria Pedro | "Fix You" | Mariana Baquero | Steal used | Steal used | — | Steal used |
| 5 | Fernando | Matilde Abreu | "The Climb" | Bruna Oliveira | Steal used | Steal used | — | Steal used |
| 5 | Fernando | Matilde Abreu | "The Climb" | Dinis Vieira | Steal used | Steal used | — | Steal used |
| 6 | Carlão | Luísa Mascarenhas | "Runnin' (Lose It All)" | Beatriz Sá | Steal used | Steal used | — | Steal used |
| 6 | Carlão | Luísa Mascarenhas | "Runnin' (Lose It All)" | Sofia Silva | Steal used | Steal used | ✔ | Steal used |
| 7 | Fernando | Valéria Guba | "Antes da Noite Acabar" | Laura Bandeira | Steal used | Steal used | Steal used | Steal used |
| 7 | Fernando | Valéria Guba | "Antes da Noite Acabar" | Alexandra Costa | Steal used | Steal used | Steal used | Steal used |
| 8 | Bárbara | Lavínia Guimarães | "Flowers" | Sara Fernandes | Steal used | Steal used | Steal used | Steal used |
| 8 | Bárbara | Lavínia Guimarães | "Flowers" | Matilde Batista | Steal used | Steal used | Steal used | Steal used |
| 9 | Carlão | Lucas Machado | "Cúpido" | Sara Pereira | Steal used | Steal used | Steal used | Steal used |
| 9 | Carlão | Lucas Machado | "Cúpido" | Alícia Espírito Santo | Steal used | Steal used | Steal used | Steal used |
| 10 | Bárbara | Rodrigo Rosa | "Billie Jean" | Beatriz Dias | Steal used | Steal used | Steal used | Steal used |
| 10 | Bárbara | Rodrigo Rosa | "Billie Jean" | Maria Rocchi | Steal used | Steal used | Steal used | Steal used |
| 11 | Aurea | Francisco Bessa | "Guerra Nuclear" | Érica Bernardo | Steal used | Steal used | Steal used | Steal used |
| 11 | Aurea | Francisco Bessa | "Guerra Nuclear" | Íris Bispo | Steal used | Steal used | Steal used | Steal used |

== Live shows ==
Live shows (Galas em direto) colour key
| Artist saved by the public's vote |
| Artist received a "Wild card" and advanced to the final |
| Artist was eliminated |

=== Episode 9 (4 June) ===
Ninth episode's results
| Order | Coach | Artist | Song | Result |
|---|---|---|---|---|
| 1 | Bárbara | Lavínia Guimarães | "You Say" | Eliminated |
| 2 | Aurea | Vicente Oliveira | "Foi Deus" | Eliminated |
| 3 | Carlão | Lucas Machado | "Stand Up" | Eliminated |
| 4 | Fernando | Júlia Machado | "Rolling in the Deep" | Public's vote |
| 5 | Bárbara | Martim d'Aires | "Passo a Passo" | Public's vote |
| 6 | Aurea | Maria Pedro | "Back to Black" | Public's vote |
| 7 | Carlão | Francisco Santos | "Amor a Portugal" | Public's vote |
| 8 | Bárbara | Maria Leonor Pereira | "Outros Planos" | Eliminated |
| 9 | Fernando | Miguel Abreu | "Quero é Viver" | Eliminated |
| 10 | Carlão | Tatiana Francisco | "Still Loving You" | Eliminated |
| 11 | Aurea | Santiago Hassam | "Monarquia" | Eliminated |
| 12 | Fernando | Eva Alves | "Who's Lovin' You" | Eliminated |

=== Episode 10 (11 June) ===
Tenth episode's results
| Order | Coach | Artist | Song | Result |
|---|---|---|---|---|
| 1 | Fernando | Francisca Rodrigues | "Because of You" | Eliminated |
| 2 | Aurea | Yasmin Alicia | "I Have Nothing" | Eliminated |
| 3 | Carlão | Francisco Horta | "Canção de Embalar" | Public's vote |
| 4 | Bárbara | Sofia Silva | "I Will Survive" | Eliminated |
| 5 | Aurea | Francisco Bessa | "Fight Song" | Eliminated |
| 6 | Fernando | Matilde Abreu | "Ó Gente da Minha Terra" | Public's vote |
| 7 | Carlão | Isabel Silva | "Mercy" | Eliminated |
| 8 | Fernando | Valéria Guba | "Love on the Brain" | Eliminated |
| 9 | Bárbara | Rodrigo Rosa | "Cry Me a River" | Eliminated |
| 10 | Aurea | Carolina Quintas | "Foi Assim que Aconteceu" | Public's vote |
| 11 | Carlão | Luísa Mascarenhas | "Skinny Love" | Eliminated |
| 12 | Bárbara | Rodrigo Oliveira | "Someone You Loved" | Public's vote |

=== Episode 11: Semifinal (18 June) ===
Eleventh episode's results
| Order | Coach | Artist | Song | Result |
|---|---|---|---|---|
| 1 | Fernando | Matilde Abreu | "Lusitana Paixão" | Eliminated |
| 2 | Carlão | Francisco Horta | "Ó Rama, Ó que Linda Rama" | Public's vote |
| 3 | Fernando | Júlia Machado | "A Million Dreams" | Public's vote |
| 4 | Aurea | Carolina Quintas | "Quem Me Dera" | Eliminated |
| 5 | Bárbara | Rodrigo Oliveira | "A Paixão (Segundo Nicolau da Viola)" | Public's vote |
| 6 | Aurea | Maria Pedro | "Só Um Beijo" | Public's vote |
| 7 | Bárbara | Martim d'Aires | "Rosa Sangue" | Eliminated |
| 8 | Carlão | Francisco Santos | "Papel Principal" | Wild card |

=== Episode 12: Final (25 June) ===
Final results
| Round | Coach | Artist | Order | Solo song | Order | Duet with coach | Result |
|---|---|---|---|---|---|---|---|
| First (Top 5) | Bárbara | Rodrigo Oliveira | 1 | "Jealous" | 6 | "Querido Ex Namorado" | Third place |
| First (Top 5) | Fernando | Júlia Machado | 7 | "Hello" | 2 | "Casa" | Top 3 |
| First (Top 5) | Carlão | Francisco Santos | 3 | "No Teu Poema" | 8 | "Dúia" | Top 3 |
| First (Top 5) | Aurea | Maria Pedro | 9 | "Amar pelos dois" | 4 | "Busy for Me" | Third place |
| First (Top 5) | Carlão | Francisco Horta | 5 | "As Mondadeiras" | 8 | "Dúia" | Top 3 |
| Second (Top 3) | Fernando | Júlia Machado | 1 | "Part of Your World" | | | Winner |
| Second (Top 3) | Carlão | Francisco Santos | 2 | "Leva-me a Viajar" | | | Runner-up |
| Second (Top 3) | Carlão | Francisco Horta | 3 | "A Roupa do Marinheiro" | | | Runner-up |

== Elimination chart ==
Teams colour key

- Team Aurea
- Team Carlão
- Team Bárbara
- Team Fernando

Results colour key

- Winner
- Runner-up
- Third place
- Saved by the "Wild card"
- Saved by public vote
- Eliminated

Results per week
| Artist | Week 1 | Week 2 | Week 3 | Week 4 |
|---|---|---|---|---|
| Júlia Machado | Safe | —N/a | Safe | Winner |
| Francisco Horta | —N/a | Safe | Safe | Runner-up |
| Francisco Santos | Safe | —N/a | Safe | Runner-up |
| Maria Pedro | Safe | —N/a | Safe | Third place |
| Rodrigo Oliveira | —N/a | Safe | Safe | Third place |
| Carolina Quintas | —N/a | Safe | Eliminated | |
| Martim d'Aires | Safe | —N/a | Eliminated | |
| Matilde Abreu | —N/a | Safe | Eliminated | |
| Francisco Bessa | —N/a | Eliminated | | |
| Yasmin Alicia | —N/a | Eliminated | | |
| Isabel Silva | —N/a | Eliminated | | |
| Luísa Mascarenhas | —N/a | Eliminated | | |
| Rodrigo Rosa | —N/a | Eliminated | | |
| Sofia Silva | —N/a | Eliminated | | |
| Francisca Rodrigues | —N/a | Eliminated | | |
| Valéria Guba | —N/a | Eliminated | | |
| Santiago Hassam | Eliminated | | | |
| Vicente Oliveira | Eliminated | | | |
| Lucas Machado | Eliminated | | | |
| Tatiana Francisco | Eliminated | | | |
| Lavínia Guimarães | Eliminated | | | |
| Maria Leonor Pereira | Eliminated | | | |
| Eva Alves | Eliminated | | | |
| Miguel Abreu | Eliminated | | | |
