= The Voice Kids (Portuguese TV series) season 3 =

The Voice Kids
- Season 3
- Hosted by: Catarina Furtado; Fábio Lopes (backstage)
- Coaches: Fernando Daniel; Bárbara Tinoco; Carlão; Carolina Deslandes
- No. of contestants: 62 artists
- Winner: Maria Gil
- Winning coach: Fernando Daniel
- Runner-up: Nicolas Alves

Release
- Original network: RTP1
- Original release: 8 May – 31 July 2022

Season chronology
- Next → Season 4

The third season of Portuguese The Voice Kids is a talent show broadcast on RTP1, which premiered on 8 May 2022. Carlão, Carolina Deslandes and Fernando Daniel returned for their second seasons as coaches and in the meantime, Marisa Liz was replaced by young sensation Bárbara Tinoco. Presenter Catarina Furtado continues to host the show, and Fábio Lopes also returns as the backstage presenter.

Maria Gil won the season, marking Fernando Daniel's second consecutive win as a coach. Just like in 2021, The Voice Kids was the program used to select the Portuguese artist that would represent the country in the Junior Eurovision Song Contest 2022. However, this time the winner (Gil) could not represent Portugal due to being above the age eligible for participants in the contest. On 10 August, RTP confirmed that one of the runners-up, Nicolas Alves, was selected to represent Portugal in the Junior Eurovision Song Contest 2022, as he received the second biggest number of votes to win The Voice Kids season three. Contrary to the final episode, as only the winner placement was announced, this implies that Margarida Rodrigues and Martim Helena finished in third place.

== Coaches ==
Coaches of The Voice Kids season 3

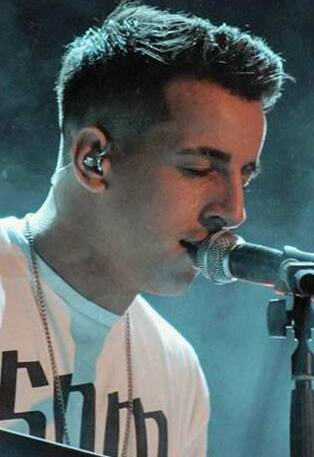
Fernando Daniel

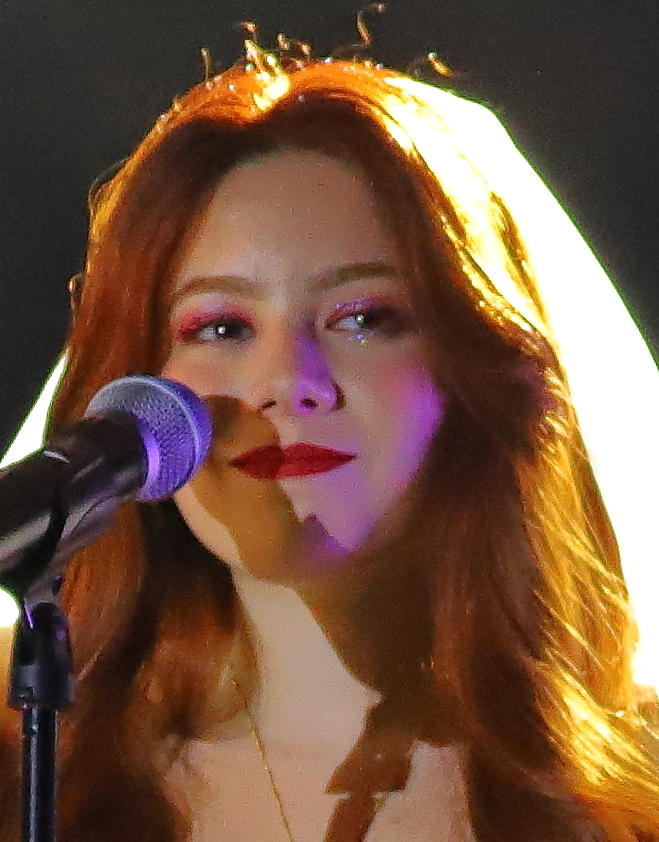
Bárbara Tinoco

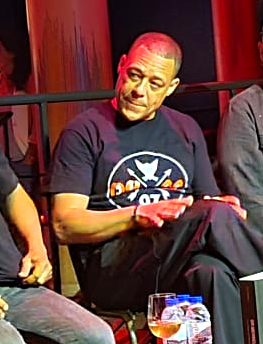
Carlão

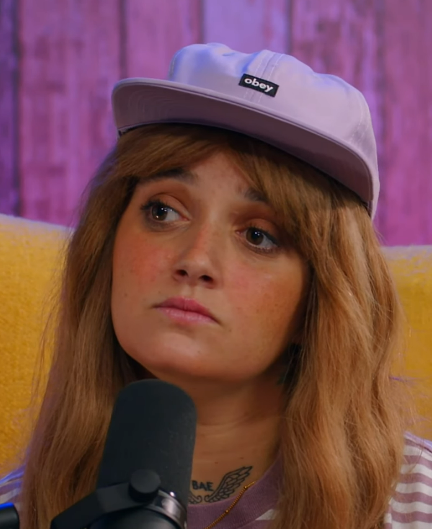
Carolina Deslandes

Fernando Daniel, Carlão and Carolina Deslandes returned from last season, with Bárbara Tinoco replacing Marisa Liz.

== Teams ==
Colour key

- Winner
- Runner-up
- Third place
- Eliminated in the Live final
- Eliminated in the Live semifinals
- Saved by another coach in the Battles
- Eliminated in Battles

Coaches	Top 61 Artists					
Fernando Daniel						
Fernando Daniel	Maria Gil	Madalena Dias	Lúcia Vicente	Noa Rangel	Dinis Reis	Íris Fernandes
Fernando Daniel	~~Beatriz Silva~~	~~Bia Antunes~~	Catarina Costa	Concha & Carolina	Madalena Oliveira	Maria Adele
Fernando Daniel	Matilde Azevedo	Miguel Fernandes	Pilar de Sousa	Salvador Botas	Sanne Chaveiro	
Bárbara Tinoco						
Bárbara Tinoco	Margarida Rodrigues	Rita Serrano	Juliana Matado	Rúben Antunes	Alice Fonseca	Joana Santos
Bárbara Tinoco	Beatriz Faria	Constança Nobre	Daniela Saraiva	Leonor Santos	Letícia Silva	Mafalda Silva
Bárbara Tinoco	Maria Lunet	Maria do Mar	Sara Gouveia	Sara Portugal		
Carlão						
Carlão	Martim Helena	Bia Antunes	Laura Pereira	Margarida Oliveira	Maria Correia	Maria R. Andrade
Carlão	Clara Soares	Francisco Moniz	Leonor Duarte	Mafalda Pinto	Margarida Castro	Mariana Martins
Carlão	Rafaela Silva	Santana	Sofia Costa Campos	Tomás Barateiro	Vitória Monteiro	
Carolina Deslandes						
Carolina Deslandes	Nicolas Alves	Beatriz Silva	Andreia Santos	Salvador Palmela	Clara Gonzalez	Rita Sales
Carolina Deslandes	~~Juliana Matado~~	~~Noa Rangel~~	Afonso Albuquerque	Carolina Grillo	Carolina Jorge	Lara Fernandes
Carolina Deslandes	Mel Monteiro	Rafael Ascenso	Rita Schreck	Rodrigo Neves		
Note: Italicized names are stolen artists (names scratched through within former teams).

== Blind auditions ==
Same as the previous season, in the Provas Cegas (Blind auditions), each coach was given two blocks to use and prevent another coach from pitching for the artist. The block buttons could be used at any time until the artist has finished their audition.

Provas Cegas colour key
✔	Coach pressed the "EU QUERO" button
	Artist joined this coach's team
	Artist was eliminated with no coach pressing their button
✘	Coach pressed the button "EU QUERO", but was blocked:
	Blocked by Fernando; Blocked by Bárbara; Blocked by Carlão; Blocked by Carolina

=== Episode 1 (8 May) ===
First episode results
Order	Artist	Age	Song	Coach's and artist's choices			
Order	Artist	Age	Song	Fernando	Bárbara	Carlão	Carolina
1	Francisco Canudo	10	"Se Eu"	—	—	—	—
2	Margarida Rodrigues	12	"I Have Nothing"	✔	✔	✔	✔
3	Nicolas Alves	12	"Beggin'"	✔	✔	✘	✔
4	Leonor Frutuoso	13	"Never Enough"	—	—	—	—
5	Dinis Reis	9	"Senhora do Alívio"	✔	✔	✔	—
6	Joana Santos	13	"Popular"	—	✔	✔	✔
7	Afonso Albuquerque	11	"That's What Friends Are For"	✔	—	✔	✔
8	Nancy Sousa	8	"Leva-me a Viajar"	—	—	—	—
9	Daniela Saraiva	14	"Jar of Hearts"	✔	✔	✔	✔
10	Santana	11	"Lote B"	—	—	✔	—
11	Sanne Chaveiro	13	"Amazing Grace"	✔	✔	✔	✘
12	Martim Lima	8	"Love Is on My Side"	—	—	—	—
13	Íris Fernandes	14	"Anyone"	✔	✔	✔	✔
14	Noa Rangel	13	"And I Am Telling You I'm Not Going"	✘	✔	✔	✔

=== Episode 2 (15 May) ===
Second episode results
Order	Artist	Age	Song	Coach's and artist's choices			
Order	Artist	Age	Song	Fernando	Bárbara	Carlão	Carolina
1	Alice Fonseca	10	"Sei Lá"	✔	✔	✔	✔
2	Rafael Ascenso	9	"Lenda da Fonte"	—	✔	—	✔
3	Sebastião Montes	9	"Sonhos de Menino"	—	—	—	—
4	Lúcia Vicente	11	"Rise Up"	✔	✔	✔	✔
5	Carolina Santos	12	"Voi Che Sapete"	—	—	—	—
6	Rita Sales	14	"Estou Além"	✔	✔	✔	✔
7	Maria Rebelo de Andrade	13	"Traitor"	✔	✔	✔	✔
8	Maria Correia	14	"Gravity"	✔	—	✔	—
9	Francisco Nunes	14	"Bohemian Rhapsody"	—	—	—	—
10	Rita Schreck	13	"Happier Than Ever"	✔	✔	✔	✔
11	Salvador Botas	13	"Imagine"	✔	✔	✔	✔
12	Beatriz Faria	10	"Quantas Cores O Vento Tem"	—	✔	—	—
13	Alice Santos	10	"Não Me Importo"	—	—	—	—
14	Andreia Santos	14	"Habits"	✘	✔	✔	✔

=== Episode 3 (22 May) ===
Third episode results
Order	Artist	Age	Song	Coach's and artist's choices			
Order	Artist	Age	Song	Fernando	Bárbara	Carlão	Carolina
1	Clara Gonzalez	12	"Por Um Triz"	✔	—	✔	✔
2	Juliana Matado	14	"If I Ain't Got You"	✘	✔	✔	✔
3	Rúben Correia	10	"Foi Feitiço"	—	—	—	—
4	Letícia Silva	14	"I Dreamed a Dream"	—	✔	✔	—
5	Vitória Monteiro	13	"João"	—	—	✔	—
6	Matilde Azevedo	9	"Sem Ti"	✔	✔	✔	—
7	Rúben Antunes	12	"drivers license"	—	✔	✔	—
8	Maria Gomes	14	"Rolling in the Deep"	—	—	—	—
9	Sara Gouveia	11	"All by Myself"	✔	✔	✔	✔
10	Simão Dias	12	"Dia de Folga"	—	—	—	—
11	Leonor Duarte	14	"Memory"	—	✔	✔	—
12	Salvador Palmela	12	"O Jogo"	—	✔	—	✔
13	Carolina Jorge	11	"Desfolhada portuguesa"	—	—	—	✔
14	Gonçalo Silva	9	"Melodia da Saudade"	—	—	—	—
15	Maria Gil	14	"Easy on Me"	✔	✔	✔	✘

=== Episode 4 (29 May) ===
Fourth episode results
Order	Artist	Age	Song	Coach's and artist's choices			
Order	Artist	Age	Song	Fernando	Bárbara	Carlão	Carolina
1	Martim Cabral	8	"Para os Braços da Minha Mãe"	—	—	—	—
2	Pilar de Sousa	13	"All I Ask"	✔	—	✔	✔
3	Clara Soares	14	"Perto de Mim"	✔	—	✔	—
4	Beatriz Silva	8	"Demagogia"	✔	—	—	—
5	Helena Cordeiro	13	"On My Own"	—	—	—	—
6	Rodrigo Neves	9	"Gosto de Ti"	—	✔	✔	✔
7	Rita Serrano	14	"I'm Not the Only One"	—	✔	—	—
8	Filipa Coelho	12	"Amor Ladrão"	—	—	—	—
9	Margarida Oliveira	14	"When I Look at You"	✔	—	✔	—
10	Maria Lunet	13	"Portas do Sol"	—	✔	—	—
11	Maria Leonor Castanheira	9	"Cidade"	—	—	—	—
12	Lara Fernandes	14	"O Namorico da Rita"	✘	✔	✔	✔
13	Tomás Barateiro	10	"Paraíso"	—	—	✔	—
14	Maria do Mar Machado	14	"i love you"	—	✔	✔	✔

=== Episode 5 (5 June) ===
Fifth episode results
Order	Artist	Age	Song	Coach's and artist's choices			
Order	Artist	Age	Song	Fernando	Bárbara	Carlão	Carolina
1	Leonor Santos	11	"Olá, Solidão"	—	✔	✔	—
2	Clara Murillo	14	"Juramento Eterno de Sal"	—	—	—	—
3	Laura Pereira	14	"Don't Watch Me Cry"	—	✔	✔	✔
4	Maria Adele	7	"Chamar a Música"	✔	—	—	—
5	Margarida Castro	14	"No Time to Die"	—	—	✔	—
6	Leonor Pereira	9	"A Thousand Years"	—	—	—	—
7	Miguel Fernandes	14	"Perfect"	✔	✔	✔	—
8	Mafalda Silva	14	"Valerie"	—	✔	—	—
9	Mariana Martins	14	"Maria do Mar"	—	—	✔	—
10	Camila Costa	14	"Flashlight"	—	—	—	—
11	Catarina Costa	10	"Girl on Fire"	✔	✔	✔	✔
12	Sara Portugal	14	"Speechless"	—	✔	—	—
13	Antónia Kalil	9	"Always Remember Us This Way"	—	—	—	—
14	Francisco Moniz	10	"Onde Vais"	—	—	✔	—
15	Íris Cardoso	12	"Não me Importo"	—	—	—	—
16	Mel Monteiro	13	"Cups (When I'm Gone)"	✔	✔	✔	✔

=== Episode 6 (19 June) ===
Sixth episode results
Order	Artist	Age	Song	Coach's and artist's choices			
Order	Artist	Age	Song	Fernando	Bárbara	Carlão	Carolina
1	Madalena Oliveira	14	"Talking to the Moon"	✔	✔	✔	—
2	Fabiana Candeias	14	"Chuva"	—	—	—	—
3	Rafaela Silva	13	"A Máquina"	—	—	✔	—
4	Manuel Lopes	11	"Runaway"	—	—	—	—
5	Bia Antunes	13	"Fallin'"	✔	✔	✔	✔
6	Mafalda Pinto	13	"Someone Like You"	—	—	✔	—
7	Maria Fernandes	9	"Telepatia"	—	—	—	—
8	Constança Nobre	13	"1 Step Forward, 3 Steps Back"	—	✔	✔	✔
9	Sofia Costa Campos	13	"idontwannabeyouanymore"	—	Team full	✔	—
10	Maria do Mar	10	"Lovely"	—	Team full	Team full	—
11	Carolina Grillo	13	"Say Something"	—	Team full	Team full	✔
12	Tiago Antunes	12	"A Million Dreams"	—	Team full	Team full	Team full
13	Madalena Dias	14	"People Help the People"	✔	Team full	Team full	Team full
14	Concha & Carolina	14	"When We Were Young"	✔	✔	✔	✔

==== Postponed auditions ====
During the blind auditions recording day, four participants tested positive for COVID-19 and were unable to perform. Their auditions were postponed and, after a draw, Carlão was the coach chosen to listen to these participants and choose only one of them to be on his team.

Sixth episode results
Order	Artist	Age	Song	Carlão's choice
1	Mariana & Beatriz	14	"Eu Gosto de Ti"	—
2	Marta Neves	13	"Sober"	—
3	João Fevereiro	13	"Sonhos de Menino"	—
4	Martim Helena	13	"Zorro"	✔

== Battles ==
For the Batalhas (Battles), each coach invited an advisor to help in the rehearsals with their teams: Agir for Team Fernando, Os Quatro e Meia for Team Bárbara, Dino D'Santiago for Team Carlão, and Miguel Cristovinho for Team Carolina.

After each battle, each coach can steal one losing artist from another team battle.

Batalhas colour key
Artist won the battle and advanced to the live shows
Artist lost the battle, but was stolen by another coach and advanced to the live shows
Artist lost the battle and was eliminated

=== Episode 7 (26 June) ===
Seventh episode results
Order	Coach	Winner	Songs	Losers	'Steal' results			
Order	Coach	Winner	Songs	Losers	Fernando	Bárbara	Carlão	Carolina
1	Carolina	Nicolas Alves	"Human"	Carolina Grillo	—	—	—	N/A
1	Carolina	Nicolas Alves	"Human"	Rita Schreck	—	—	—	N/A
2	Carlão	Laura Pereira	"Gosto de Ti"	Francisco Moniz	—	—	N/A	—
2	Carlão	Laura Pereira	"Gosto de Ti"	Rafaela Silva	—	—	N/A	—
3	Fernando	Dinis Reis	"Menina Estás à Janela"	Beatriz Silva	N/A	—	—	✔
3	Fernando	Dinis Reis	"Menina Estás à Janela"	Maria Adele	N/A	—	—	—
4	Bárbara	Joana Santos	"Defying Gravity"	Letícia Silva	—	N/A	—	Steal used
4	Bárbara	Joana Santos	"Defying Gravity"	Sara Portugal	—	N/A	—	Steal used
5	Carlão	Maria Correia	"Bad Guy"	Clara Soares	—	—	N/A	Steal used
5	Carlão	Maria Correia	"Bad Guy"	Leonor Duarte	—	—	N/A	Steal used
6	Fernando	Lúcia Vicente	"Do Meu ao Teu Correio"	Catarina Costa	N/A	—	—	Steal used
6	Fernando	Lúcia Vicente	"Do Meu ao Teu Correio"	Matilde Azevedo	N/A	—	—	Steal used
7	Carolina	Andreia Santos	"Who's Loving You"	Juliana Matado	—	✔	—	Steal used
7	Carolina	Andreia Santos	"Who's Loving You"	Noa Rangel	✔	—	✔	Steal used

=== Episode 8 (3 July) ===
Eighth episode results
Order	Coach	Winner	Songs	Losers	'Steal' results			
Order	Coach	Winner	Songs	Losers	Fernando	Bárbara	Carlão	Carolina
1	Bárbara	Alice Fonseca	"Mais ou Menos Isto"	Beatriz Faria	Steal used	Steal used	—	Steal used
1	Bárbara	Alice Fonseca	"Mais ou Menos Isto"	Leonor Santos	Steal used	Steal used	—	Steal used
2	Fernando	Madalena Dias	"If the World Was Ending"	Salvador Botas	Steal used	Steal used	—	Steal used
2	Fernando	Madalena Dias	"If the World Was Ending"	Sanne Chaveiro	Steal used	Steal used	—	Steal used
3	Carlão	Martim Helena	"A Paixão (Segundo Nicolau da Viola)"	Margarida Castro	Steal used	Steal used	N/A	Steal used
3	Carlão	Martim Helena	"A Paixão (Segundo Nicolau da Viola)"	Santana	Steal used	Steal used	N/A	Steal used
3	Carlão	Martim Helena	"A Paixão (Segundo Nicolau da Viola)"	Tomás Barateiro	Steal used	Steal used	N/A	Steal used
4	Bárbara	Rúben Antunes	"Lose You to Love Me"	Constança Nobre	Steal used	Steal used	—	Steal used
4	Bárbara	Rúben Antunes	"Lose You to Love Me"	Daniela Saraiva	Steal used	Steal used	—	Steal used
5	Carolina	Clara Gonzalez	"Meu Amor de Longe"	Carolina Jorge	Steal used	Steal used	—	Steal used
5	Carolina	Clara Gonzalez	"Meu Amor de Longe"	Rodrigo Neves	Steal used	Steal used	—	Steal used
6	Fernando	Maria Gil	"You Are the Reason"	Concha & Carolina	Steal used	Steal used	—	Steal used
6	Fernando	Maria Gil	"You Are the Reason"	Miguel Fernandes	Steal used	Steal used	—	Steal used
7	Carolina	Rita Sales	"Outras Línguas"	Afonso Albuquerque	Steal used	Steal used	—	Steal used
7	Carolina	Rita Sales	"Outras Línguas"	Mel Monteiro	Steal used	Steal used	—	Steal used

=== Episode 9 (10 July) ===
Ninth episode results
Order	Coach	Winner	Songs	Losers	'Steal' results			
Order	Coach	Winner	Songs	Losers	Fernando	Bárbara	Carlão	Carolina
1	Carlão	Margarida Oliveira	"Feeling Good"	Mafalda Pinto	Steal used	Steal used	N/A	Steal used
1	Carlão	Margarida Oliveira	"Feeling Good"	Sofia Costa Campos	Steal used	Steal used	N/A	Steal used
2	Bárbara	Rita Serrano	"Só Um Beijo"	Maria Lunet	Steal used	Steal used	—	Steal used
2	Bárbara	Rita Serrano	"Só Um Beijo"	Maria do Mar	Steal used	Steal used	—	Steal used
3	Carolina	Salvador Palmela	"Maria Albertina"	Lara Fernandes	Steal used	Steal used	—	Steal used
3	Carolina	Salvador Palmela	"Maria Albertina"	Rafael Ascenso	Steal used	Steal used	—	Steal used
4	Fernando	Íris Fernandes	"Titanium"	Bia Antunes	Steal used	Steal used	✔	Steal used
4	Fernando	Íris Fernandes	"Titanium"	Madalena Oliveira	Steal used	Steal used	—	Steal used
4	Fernando	Íris Fernandes	"Titanium"	Pilar de Sousa	Steal used	Steal used	—	Steal used
5	Carlão	Maria Rebelo de Andrade	"All I Want"	Mariana Martins	Steal used	Steal used	Steal used	Steal used
5	Carlão	Maria Rebelo de Andrade	"All I Want"	Vitória Monteiro	Steal used	Steal used	Steal used	Steal used
6	Bárbara	Margarida Rodrigues	"Symphony"	Mafalda Silva	Steal used	Steal used	Steal used	Steal used
6	Bárbara	Margarida Rodrigues	"Symphony"	Sara Gouveia	Steal used	Steal used	Steal used	Steal used

== Live shows ==
Galas em direto colour key
Artist saved by the public's vote
Artist was eliminated

=== Episode 10: Semifinal 1 (17 July) ===
Semifinal 1 results
Order	Coach	Artist	Song	Result
1	Fernando	Íris Fernandes	"You Raise Me Up"	Eliminated
2	Carlão	Martim Helena	"Meu Nome é Saudade"	Saved by public
3	Bárbara	Alice Fonseca	"Talvez"	Eliminated
4	Carolina	Rita Sales	"The Show Must Go On"	Eliminated
5	Fernando	Dinis Reis	"Chora, Carolina"	Eliminated
6	Carlão	Maria Correia	"Jealous"	Eliminated
7	Carolina	Clara Gonzalez	"Perdidamente"	Eliminated
8	Fernando	Maria Gil	"Unfaithful"	Saved by public
9	Bárbara	Rita Serrano	"Bruises"	Saved by public
10	Carolina	Nicolas Alves	"They Don't Care About Us"	Saved by public
11	Carlão	Maria Rebelo de Andrade	"As Rosas"	Eliminated
12	Bárbara	Joana Santos	"Longe do Mundo"	Eliminated

=== Episode 11: Semifinal 2 (24 July) ===
Semifinal 2 results
Order	Coach	Artist	Song	Result
1	Bárbara	Juliana Matado	"Scars to Your Beautiful"	Eliminated
2	Carolina	Salvador Palmela	"Zorro"	Eliminated
3	Fernando	Noa Rangel	"Beautiful"	Eliminated
4	Carlão	Bia Antunes	"Andorinhas"	Saved by public
5	Bárbara	Rúben Antunes	"Mais Perto de Mim"	Eliminated
6	Carolina	Andreia Santos	"Creep"	Eliminated
7	Fernando	Lúcia Vicente	"Can't Help Falling in Love"	Eliminated
8	Bárbara	Margarida Rodrigues	"Stone Cold"	Saved by public
9	Carlão	Laura Pereira	"Be the One"	Eliminated
10	Carolina	Beatriz Silva	"Quero é Viver"	Saved by public
11	Fernando	Madalena Dias	"Read All About It"	Saved by public
12	Carlão	Margarida Oliveira	"Listen"	Eliminated

=== Episode 12: Final (31 July) ===
Final results
Round	Coach	Artist	Order	Solo song	Order	Duet with coach	Result
First (Top 8)	Fernando	Madalena Dias	1	"Let It Go"	4	"Unstoppable"	Eliminated
First (Top 8)	Carlão	Bia Antunes	2	"Gaivota"	9	"Bom Rapaz"	Eliminated
First (Top 8)	Carolina	Beatriz Silva	3	"Cinderela"	11	"Eu Sei Que Vou Te Amar"	Eliminated
First (Top 8)	Fernando	Maria Gil	6	"One and Only"	4	"Unstoppable"	Finalist
First (Top 8)	Bárbara	Margarida Rodrigues	5	"Run to You"	12	"Anda Comigo Ver os Aviões"	Finalist
First (Top 8)	Carlão	Martim Helena	7	"O Homem do Leme"	9	"Bom Rapaz"	Finalist
First (Top 8)	Carolina	Nicolas Alves	8	"Somebody to Love"	11	"Eu Sei Que Vou Te Amar"	Finalist
First (Top 8)	Bárbara	Rita Serrano	10	"Bam Bam"	12	"Anda Comigo Ver os Aviões"	Eliminated
Second (Top 4)	Carlão	Martim Helena	1	"Zorro"			Third place
Second (Top 4)	Fernando	Maria Gil	2	"Easy on Me"			Winner
Second (Top 4)	Carolina	Nicolas Alves	3	"Beggin'"			Runner-up
Second (Top 4)	Bárbara	Margarida Rodrigues	4	"I Have Nothing"			Third place

== Elimination chart ==
Teams colour key

- Team Fernando
- Team Bárbara
- Team Carlão
- Team Carolina

Results colour key

- Winner
- Runner-up
- Third place
- Saved by public vote
- Eliminated

Results per week
Artist	Week 1	Week 2	Week 3	
Artist	Week 1	Week 2	Round 1	Round 2
Maria Gil	Safe	—N/a	Safe	Winner
Nicolas Alves	Safe	—N/a	Safe	Runner-up
Margarida Rodrigues	—N/a	Safe	Safe	Third place
Martim Helena	Safe	—N/a	Safe	Third place
Madalena Dias	—N/a	Safe	Eliminated	
Rita Serrano	Safe	—N/a	Eliminated	
Bia Antunes	—N/a	Safe	Eliminated	
Beatriz Silva	—N/a	Safe	Eliminated	
Lúcia Vicente	—N/a	Eliminated		
Noa Rangel	—N/a	Eliminated		
Juliana Matado	—N/a	Eliminated		
Rúben Antunes	—N/a	Eliminated		
Laura Pereira	—N/a	Eliminated		
Margarida Oliveira	—N/a	Eliminated		
Andreia Santos	—N/a	Eliminated		
Salvador Palmela	—N/a	Eliminated		
Dinis Reis	Eliminated			
Íris Fernandes	Eliminated			
Alice Fonseca	Eliminated			
Joana Santos	Eliminated			
Maria Correia	Eliminated			
Maria R. Andrade	Eliminated			
Clara Gonzalez	Eliminated			
Rita Sales	Eliminated			
