= The Voice Kids (Portuguese TV series) season 5 =

The Voice Kids
- Season 5
- Hosted by: Catarina Furtado; Catarina Maia (backstage)
- Coaches: Bárbara Tinoco; Nininho Vaz Maia; Cuca Roseta; Carlão
- No. of contestants: 64
- Winners: Victoria Nicole
- Winning coach: Nininho Vaz Maia
- Runners-up: Francisco Dias; Leonor Quinteiro; Maria Benedita

Release
- Original network: RTP1
- Original release: 14 April – 7 July 2024

Season chronology
- ← Previous; Season 4 Next → Season 6

The fifth season of Portuguese The Voice Kids is a talent show broadcast on RTP1, which premiered on 14 April 2024. Carlão and Bárbara Tinoco returned for their fourth and third seasons as coaches, respectively. In the meantime, Fernando Daniel and Aurea were replaced by Nininho Vaz Maia and Got Talent Portugal judge Cuca Roseta. Catarina Furtado and Catarina Maia both returned as the host and backstage presenter, respectively.

Victoria Nicole won the competition on 7 July 2024, marking Nininho Vaz Maia's first and only win as a coach and the first artist to receive a "superpass" in the blind auditions to go on and win an entire season. Just like in the previous three seasons, The Voice Kids was the program used to select the Portuguese artist that would represent the country in the Junior Eurovision Song Contest 2024.

== Coaches ==
Coaches of The Voice Kids season 5

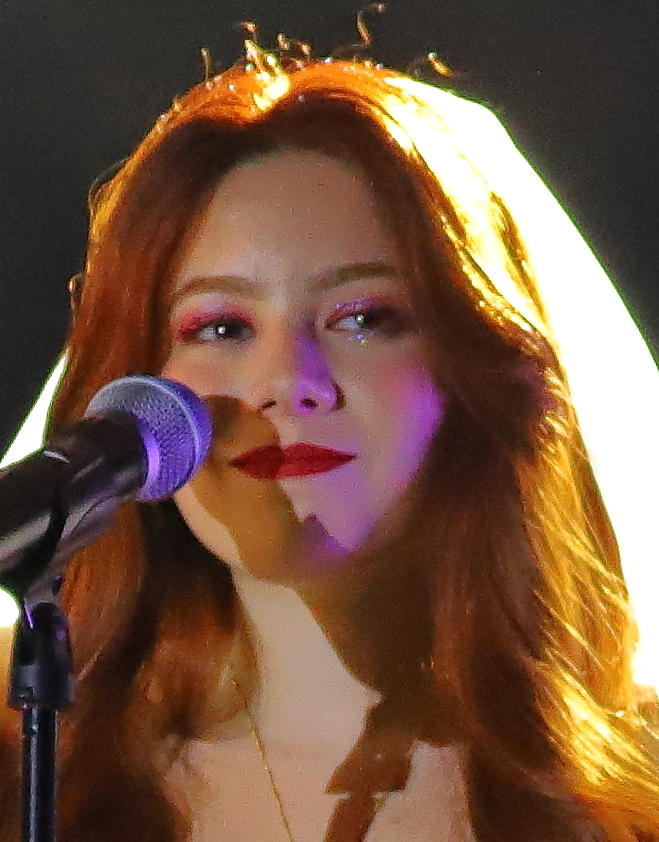
Bárbara Tinoco

Nininho Vaz Maia

Cuca Roseta

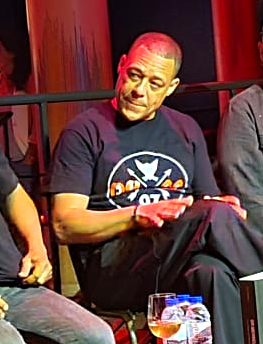
Carlão

Fernando Daniel and Aurea departed the series while Carlão and Bárbara Tinoco returned. Nininho Vaz Maia and Got Talent Portugal judge Cuca Roseta were announced as the two new coaches of this season.

== Teams ==
Colour key

- Winner
- Runner-up
- Eliminated in the Live final
- Eliminated in the Live shows
- Eliminated in Battles

Coaching teams
Coaches	Top 64 Artists					
Bárbara Tinoco						
Bárbara Tinoco	Maria Benedita	Simão Romão	Constança Santos	Diogo Serrano	Gonçalo Quintela	Victória Almeida
Bárbara Tinoco	Carlota Santos	Duarte Jordão	Estrela do Vale	Maria Caneto	Maria Carvalhas	Maria Paulo
Bárbara Tinoco	Maria Rita Neves	Matilde Rodrigues	Rodrigo Cardeal	Sofia Fonseca		
Nininho Vaz Maia						
Nininho Vaz Maia	Victoria Nicole	Alícia Espírito Santo	Maria Verne	Martim Costa	Dinis Oliveira	Maria Carolina Pinto
Nininho Vaz Maia	Beatriz Duarte	Francisca Grenha	Francisco Moniz	Henrique Conceição	Leonor Pacheco	Maria Francisca
Nininho Vaz Maia	Mariana Caldeira	Matilde Machado	Matilde Salvador	Victória Mendoza		
Cuca Roseta						
Cuca Roseta	Leonor Quinteiro	Leonor Vaz Dias	Samuel Sousa	Sofia Figueiredo	Diogo Gante	Sofia Salgado
Cuca Roseta	Adéle Kuhn	Beatriz Quintela	Carolina Mota	Diana Arrais	Lara Oliveira	Mariana Pacheco
Cuca Roseta	Miriam Andrade	Sofia Chaves	Sofia Ferreira	Teresa de Lima		
Carlão						
Carlão	Francisco Dias	Duarte Antunes	Eva Rocha	Pedro Ribeiro	Constança Soares	Tiago Freitas
Carlão	Alice Cruz	Carlota Gregório	Catarina Martins	Francisca Prayce	Inês Mendes	Laura Araújo
Carlão	Laura Franco	Leonor Silva	Ricardo Sousa	Rodrigo Nunes		
Note: Bold names are recipients of the 'super pass'.

== Blind auditions ==
Same as the previous season, in the blind auditions (Provas Cegas), each coach was given two superblocks to use and prevent another coach from pitching for the artist. The superblock buttons could be used at any time until the artist has finished their audition. Additionally, each coach could use one 'super pass', which defaults the artist to their team and sends the artist directly to the live shows (Galas em Direto). At the end of the round, Nininho and Cuca did not use either of their two superblocks.

Blind auditions colour key
✔	Coach pressed the "EU QUERO" button
	Artist joined this coach's team
	Artist was eliminated with no coach pressing their button
	Artist received a 'super pass' and was defaulted to this coach's team
✘	Coach lost the chance to pitch for this artist after another coach's 'super pass'
✘	Coach presed the button "EU QUERO", but was:
	Blocked by Bárbara; Blocked by Nininho; Blocked by Cuca; Blocked by Carlão

=== Episode 1 (14 April) ===
First episode's results
Order	Artist	Age	Song	Coach's and artist's choices			
Order	Artist	Age	Song	Bárbara	Nininho	Cuca	Carlão
1	Tiago Freitas	11	"Dance Monkey"	✔	✔	✔	✔
2	Martim Costa	11	"The Best"	–	✔	✔	✔
3	Estrela do Vale	10	"Part of Your World"	✔	✔	✔	✔
4	Leonor Jesuíno	13	"Loucamente"	–	–	–	–
5	Maria Benedita	13	"Drivers License"	✔	✔	✔	✔
6	Samuel Sousa	13	"Madrugou"	–	✔	✔	–
7	Joana Cavaco	12	"Pastor Alentejano"	–	–	–	–
8	Pedro Ribeiro	11	"O Primeiro Dia"	✔	–	✔	✔
9	Constança Soares	11	"And I Am Telling You I'm Not Going"	✘	✘	–	✔
10	Maria Almeida	11	"E Agora?"	–	–	–	–
11	Miriam Andrade	12	"Canção do Mar"	✔	✔	✔	✔
12	Henrique Conceição	11	"Where I Belong"	–	✔	✔	–
13	Francisco Dias	13	"Believe"	✔	✔	✘	✔

=== Episode 2 (21 April) ===
Second episode's results
Order	Artist	Age	Song	Coach's and artist's choices			
Order	Artist	Age	Song	Bárbara	Nininho	Cuca	Carlão
1	Duarte Jordão	8	"A Minha Casinha"	✔	✔	✔	✔
2	Matilde Machado	14	"Ai Coração"	✔	✔	–	–
3	Núria Botelho	14	"Tattoo"	–	–	–	–
4	Alícia Espírito Santo	13	"If I Ain't Got You"	✔	✔	✔	✔
5	Emanuel Gonçalves	12	"Ai Como eu Gosto de Voltar"	–	–	–	–
6	Francisca Prayce	9	"Dona Maria"	✔	–	–	✔
7	Eva Rocha	10	"Writing's on the Wall"	✔	✔	✔	✔
8	Kyara Saraiva	11	"Love in the Dark"	–	–	–	–
9	Gonçalo Quintela	9	"Love of My Life"	✔	–	✔	–
10	Beatriz Quintela	11	"Outros Planos"	–	–	✔	–
11	Maria Rita Neves	11	"Shallow"	✔	✔	✔	✔
12	Madalena Corte-Real	10	"Que Sera, Sera"	–	–	–	–
13	Sofia Figueiredo	14	"I See Red"	–	✔	✔	✔
14	Victoria Nicole	13	"Voilà"	✘	✔	✘	✘

=== Episode 3 (28 April) ===
Third episode's results
Order	Artist	Age	Song	Coach's and artist's choices			
Order	Artist	Age	Song	Bárbara	Nininho	Cuca	Carlão
1	Margarida & Leonor	8-12	"Cidade"	–	–	–	–
2	Francisco Moniz	12	"Olá Solidão"	–	✔	–	✔
3	Carolina Mota	14	"Creep"	–	✔	✔	✔
4	Maria João Santos	9	"Chamar a Música"	–	–	–	–
5	Dinis Oliveira	11	"Casa"	–	✔	–	–
6	Laura Araújo	14	"I Could Have Danced All Night"	✔	✔	✔	✔
7	Verónica Piçarro	11	"Mar Salgado"	–	–	–	–
8	Maria Caneto	9	"Quero é Viver"	✔	–	✔	–
9	Mariana Pacheco	14	"Back to Black"	–	–	✔	–
10	Beatriz da Silva	12	"Speechless"	–	–	–	–
11	Inês Mendes	12	"Brincos para Brincar"	✔	✔	✘	✔
12	Leonardo Esperanço	9	"Nuvem"	–	–	–	–
13	Adéle Kuhn	11	"Premier Amour"	–	✔	✔	–
14	Simão Romão	13	"The House of the Rising Sun"	✔	✔	✔	✘

=== Episode 4 (5 May) ===
Fourth episode's results
Order	Artist	Age	Song	Coach's and artist's choices			
Order	Artist	Age	Song	Bárbara	Nininho	Cuca	Carlão
1	Matilde Pinheiro	14	"Edelweiss"	–	–	–	–
2	Duarte Antunes	13	"The Loneliest"	✔	–	–	✔
3	Mariana Caldeira	13	"When I Was Your Man"	–	✔	–	–
4	Carlota Gomes	8	"Querido Ex Namorado"	–	–	–	–
5	Maria Paulo	14	"Skyfall"	✔	✔	✔	✔
6	Diogo Gante	13	"Limoeiro"	–	–	✔	–
7	Joana Marques	13	"Desfolhada portuguesa"	–	–	–	–
8	Leonor Vaz Dias	14	"Skinny Love"	✔	✔	✔	✔
9	Carlota Santos	10	"All I Want"	✔	–	–	✔
10	Beatriz Simões	14	"Talvez…"	–	–	–	–
11	Leonor Pacheco	12	"Viagem ao Passado"	–	✔	✔	–
12	Nuno Barros	10	"Ao Teu Ouvido"	–	–	–	–
13	Matilde Rodrigues	11	"Amanhã"	✔	–	✔	–
14	Leonor Quinteiro	13	"Eu Sei"	✘	✘	✔	✘

=== Episode 5 (12 May) ===
Fifth episode's results
Order	Artist	Age	Song	Coach's and artist's choices			
Order	Artist	Age	Song	Bárbara	Nininho	Cuca	Carlão
1	Henrique Feio	14	"Yellow"	–	–	–	–
2	Laura Franco	14	"Angel by the Wings"	–	–	✔	✔
3	Francisca Grenha	12	"idontwannabeyouanymore"	–	✔	–	–
4	Teresa Calais-Pedro	10	"Na Ilha"	–	–	–	–
5	Rodrigo Nunes	12	"Flor Sem Tempo"	–	✔	–	✔
6	Mariana Jesus	13	"In the Stars"	–	–	–	–
7	Sofia Salgado	12	"Train Wreck"	–	–	✔	✔
8	Matilde Salvador	11	"Por Mim"	–	✔	✔	✔
9	Gabriel Valdez	11	"When I Was Your Man"	–	–	–	–
10	Constança Santos	13	"Set Fire to the Rain"	✔	✔	–	–
11	Maria Luiza Pinheiro	9	"Melodia da Saudade"	–	–	–	–
12	Ricardo Sousa	13	"Until I Found You"	✔	–	–	✔
13	Sofia Fonseca	14	"Foi Deus"	✔	✔	–	✔
14	Mafalda Rosa	14	"Gravity"	–	–	–	–
15	Victória Almeida	14	"Can't Catch Me Now"	✔	✘	✘	✘

=== Episode 6 (19 May) ===
Sixth episode's results
Order	Artist	Age	Song	Coach's and artist's choices			
Order	Artist	Age	Song	Bárbara	Nininho	Cuca	Carlão
1	Maria Carvalhas	12	"Lips Are Movin"	✔	✔	✔	✔
2	Maria do Carmo	11	"Roubei-te um Beijo"	–	–	–	–
3	Diogo Serrano	11	"I Still Haven't Found..."	✔	✔	–	–
4	Leonor Matos	13	"Juro"	–	–	–	–
5	Leonor Silva	14	"When We Were Young"	✘	–	–	✔
6	Diana Arrais	9	"Diamonds"	–	–	✔	–
7	Lucas Costa	13	"Love Is Gone"	–	–	–	–
8	Maria Carolina Pinto	14	"Primavera"	–	✔	–	✔
9	Sofia Ferreira	11	"Amanhã"	–	–	✔	–
10	Sara Fernandes	11	"Despedida de Solteira"	–	–	–	–
11	Maria Francisca Ribeiro	13	"Set Fire to the Rain"	–	✔	–	–
12	Rodrigo Pereira	14	"Gosto de Ti"	–	–	–	–
13	Maria Verne	13	"Sr. Extraterrestre"	–	✔	–	✔
14	Alice Conceição	11	"Eu Sei, Tu És..."	–	–	–	–
15	Carlota Gregório	14	"Love in the Dark"	✔	✔	✔	✔

=== Episode 7 (26 May) ===
Seventh episode's results
Order	Artist	Age	Song	Coach's and artist's choices			
Order	Artist	Age	Song	Bárbara	Nininho	Cuca	Carlão
1	Rodrigo Costa	12	"Sarà perché ti amo"	–	–	–	–
2	Sofia Chaves	14	"Don't Rain on My Parade"	–	–	✔	✔
3	Victória Mendoza	13	"Te Lo Agradezco"	–	✔	–	–
4	Ema Neuparth	11	"Raiva"	–	–	–	–
5	Teresa de Lima	14	"Amor Ladrão"	–	–	✔	–
6	Beatriz Barradas	12	"Tiro ao Alvo"	–	–	–	–
7	Alice Cruz	14	"Love on the Brain"	–	–	–	✔
8	Rihana Pegado	14	"Onde Vais"	–	–	–	–
9	Rodrigo Cardeal	12	"CASA"	✔	–	–	✔
10	Madalena Marques	8	"Saia da Carolina"	Team full	–	–	–
11	Lara Oliveira	11	"Há Dias Assim"	Team full	–	✔	–
12	Maria Vinagre	12	"Runaway"	Team full	–	Team full	–
13	Joana Oliveira	13	"Desfado"	Team full	–	Team full	–
14	Beatriz Duarte	12	"Um Mundo Ideal"	Team full	✔	Team full	–
15	Catarina Martins	11	"I Have Nothing"	Team full	Team full	Team full	✔

== Battles ==
In the battles (Batalhas), each coach pairs three of their artists up with only one winner to move on to the live shows. Contrary to previous seasons, there are no steals this season.

Battles colour key
Artist won the battle and advanced to the live shows
Artist lost the battle and was eliminated

=== Episode 8 (2 June) ===
Eighth episode's results
Order	Coach	Winner	Songs	Losers
1	Bárbara	Gonçalo Quintela	"Longe do Mundo"	Estrela do Vale
1	Bárbara	Gonçalo Quintela	"Longe do Mundo"	Maria Caneto
2	Nininho	Alícia Espírito Santo	"Rise Up"	Matilde Machado
2	Nininho	Alícia Espírito Santo	"Rise Up"	Maria Francisca
3	Carlão	Francisco Dias	"Somewhere Over the Rainbow"	Laura Araújo
3	Carlão	Francisco Dias	"Somewhere Over the Rainbow"	Laura Franco
4	Cuca	Diogo Gante	"Queda do Império"	Beatriz Quintela
4	Cuca	Diogo Gante	"Queda do Império"	Lara Oliveira
5	Bárbara	Constança Santos	"Pica Do 7"	Rodrigo Cardeal
5	Bárbara	Constança Santos	"Pica Do 7"	Carlota Santos
6	Nininho	Martim Costa	"Maria Joana"	Francisca Grenha
6	Nininho	Martim Costa	"Maria Joana"	Henrique Conceição
7	Carlão	Duarte Antunes	"Sweet Child o' Mine"	Alice Cruz
7	Carlão	Duarte Antunes	"Sweet Child o' Mine"	Ricardo Sousa
8	Cuca	Samuel Sousa	"Tiro-liro-liro"	Miriam Andrade
8	Cuca	Samuel Sousa	"Tiro-liro-liro"	Teresa de Lima
9	Bárbara	Diogo Serrano	"Pó de Arroz"	Duarte Jordão
9	Bárbara	Diogo Serrano	"Pó de Arroz"	Matilde Rodrigues
10	Carlão	Eva Rocha	"Halo"	Leonor Silva
10	Carlão	Eva Rocha	"Halo"	Carlota Gregório

=== Episode 9 (16 June) ===
Ninth episode's results
Order	Coach	Winner	Songs	Losers
1	Nininho	Maria Carolina Pinto	"Andorinhas"	Beatriz Duarte
1	Nininho	Maria Carolina Pinto	"Andorinhas"	Leonor Pacheco
2	Cuca	Leonor Vaz Dias	"Perfect"	Adéle Kuhn
2	Cuca	Leonor Vaz Dias	"Perfect"	Carolina Mota
3	Carlão	Tiago Freitas	"Eco"	Francisca Prayce
3	Carlão	Tiago Freitas	"Eco"	Catarina Martins
4	Bárbara	Maria Benedita	"All I Want"	Maria Rita Neves
4	Bárbara	Maria Benedita	"All I Want"	Maria Carvalhas
5	Nininho	Dinis Oliveira	"Mãe"	Francisco Moniz
5	Nininho	Dinis Oliveira	"Mãe"	Matilde Salvador
6	Cuca	Sofia Figueiredo	"Flowers"	Sofia Chaves
6	Cuca	Sofia Figueiredo	"Flowers"	Mariana Pacheco
7	Carlão	Pedro Ribeiro	"Na Escola"	Inês Mendes
7	Carlão	Pedro Ribeiro	"Na Escola"	Rodrigo Nunes
8	Nininho	Maria Verne	"Havana"	Victória Mendoza
8	Nininho	Maria Verne	"Havana"	Mariana Caldeira
9	Cuca	Sofia Salgado	"Maria Albertina"	Sofia Ferreira
9	Cuca	Sofia Salgado	"Maria Albertina"	Diana Arrais
10	Bárbara	Simão Romão	"Sign of the Times"	Sofia Fonseca
10	Bárbara	Simão Romão	"Sign of the Times"	Maria Paulo

== Live shows ==
Live shows (Galas em direto) colour key
Artist saved by the public's vote
Artist was eliminated

=== Episode 10: Semifinal 1 (23 June) ===
Due to Bárbara Tinoco having pre-commitments, Aurea, who was a coach in the previous season, filled in as a coach in her place for this episode.

Tenth episode's results
Order	Coach	Artist	Song	Result
1	Carlão	Francisco Dias	"Never Enough"	Public's vote
2	Bárbara	Maria Benedita	"Por um Triz"	Public's vote
3	Cuca	Diogo Gante	"Quero é Viver"	Eliminated
4	Nininho	Victoria Nicole	"I Surrender"	Public's vote
5	Carlão	Tiago Freitas	"Desfolhada portuguesa"	Eliminated
6	Bárbara	Victória Almeida	"The Winner Takes It All"	Eliminated
7	Cuca	Leonor Quinteiro	"Ó Gente da Minha Terra"	Public's vote
8	Bárbara	Gonçalo Quintela	"Eu Não Sei Quem Te Perdeu"	Eliminated
9	Carlão	Constança Soares	"I Dreamed a Dream"	Eliminated
10	Nininho	Dinis Oliveira	"Não Vás Embora, Rapaz!"	Eliminated
11	Cuca	Sofia Salgado	"Ghost Town"	Eliminated
12	Nininho	Maria Carolina Pinto	"Rosa Sangue"	Eliminated

=== Episode 11: Semifinal 2 (30 June) ===
Eleventh episode's results
Order	Coach	Artist	Song	Result
1	Bárbara	Simão Romão	"Beautiful Things"	Public's vote
2	Nininho	Alícia Espírito Santo	"Natural Woman"	Public's vote
3	Cuca	Samuel Sousa	"Maldição"	Eliminated
4	Carlão	Eva Rocha	"Listen"	Eliminated
5	Bárbara	Diogo Serrano	"Longe Do Mundo"	Eliminated
6	Cuca	Leonor Vaz Dias	"Thank You for the Music"	Public's vote
7	Nininho	Martim Costa	"Always Remember Us This Way"	Eliminated
8	Carlão	Pedro Ribeiro	"Silêncio e Tanta Gente"	Eliminated
9	Bárbara	Constança Santos	"Chico"	Eliminated
10	Cuca	Sofia Figueiredo	"Hello"	Eliminated
11	Nininho	Maria Verne	"Que O Amor Te Salve Nesta Noite Escura"	Eliminated
12	Carlão	Duarte Antunes	"Smells Like Teen Spirit"	Public's vote

=== Episode 12: Final (7 July) ===
Final results
Round	Order	Coach	Artist	Song	Result
First (Top 8)	1	Nininho	Victoria Nicole	"My Heart Will Go On"	Finalist
First (Top 8)	2	Carlão	Duarte Antunes	"Ouvi Dizer"	Eliminated
First (Top 8)	3	Bárbara	Maria Benedita	"This Is Me"	Finalist
First (Top 8)	4	Carlão	Francisco Dias	"I Will Always Love You"	Finalist
First (Top 8)	5	Cuca	Leonor Vaz Dias	"I Still Haven't Found…"	Eliminated
First (Top 8)	6	Nininho	Alícia Espírito Santo	"Foste Embora"	Eliminated
First (Top 8)	7	Cuca	Leonor Quinteiro	"Hurt"	Finalist
First (Top 8)	8	Bárbara	Simão Romão	"A Máquina"	Eliminated
Second (Top 4)	1	Carlão	Francisco Dias	"Believe"	Runner-up
Second (Top 4)	2	Bárbara	Maria Benedita	"Drivers License"	Runner-up
Second (Top 4)	3	Nininho	Victoria Nicole	"Voilà"	Winner
Second (Top 4)	4	Cuca	Leonor Quinteiro	"Eu Sei"	Runner-up

== Elimination chart ==
Teams colour key

- Team Bárbara
- Team Nininho
- Team Cuca
- Team Carlão

Results colour key

- Winner
- Runner-up
- Saved by public vote
- Eliminated

Results per week
Artist	Week 1	Week 2	Week 3	
Artist	Week 1	Week 2	Round 1	Round 2
Victoria Nicole	Safe	—N/a	Safe	Winner
Francisco Dias	Safe	—N/a	Safe	Runner-up
Leonor Quinteiro	Safe	—N/a	Safe	Runner-up
Maria Benedita	Safe	—N/a	Safe	Runner-up
Simão Romão	—N/a	Safe	Eliminated	
Alícia Espírito Santo	—N/a	Safe	Eliminated	
Leonor Vaz Dias	—N/a	Safe	Eliminated	
Duarte Antunes	—N/a	Safe	Eliminated	
Constança Santos	—N/a	Eliminated		
Diogo Serrano	—N/a	Eliminated		
Maria Verne	—N/a	Eliminated		
Martim Costa	—N/a	Eliminated		
Samuel Sousa	—N/a	Eliminated		
Sofia Figueiredo	—N/a	Eliminated		
Eva Rocha	—N/a	Eliminated		
Pedro Ribeiro	—N/a	Eliminated		
Gonçalo Quintela	Eliminated			
Victória Almeida	Eliminated			
Dinis Oliveira	Eliminated			
Maria Carolina Pinto	Eliminated			
Diogo Gante	Eliminated			
Sofia Salgado	Eliminated			
Constança Soares	Eliminated			
Tiago Freitas	Eliminated			
