= Okay Alright =

Single by Aurea
- Released: August 2008
- Recorded: 2008
- Genre: Soul, pop, reggae
- Length: 4:00
- Label: Blim Records
- Songwriter(s): Aurea
- Producer(s): Rui Ribeiro

Aurea singles chronology
"Okay Alright" (2008)	"Busy for Me" (2010)

"Okay Alright" is a pop, reggae song performed by Portuguese pop, blue-eyed soul singer Aurea. It was Aurea's debut single and it was released in August 2008. Its music video premiered on September 24, 2008. The song was used in the soundtrack for the Portuguese soap opera "Morangos com Açúcar.

== Background and composition ==
The song was written by Aurea and produced by Rui Ribeiro. The song is a pop-reggae ballad influenced by well-known music artists such as Bob Marley. Lyrically, the song talks about general love, Aurea compares love with a tiny sparrow, as she says in the line "You can't hold it on a cage no no you can't, it flies free through the morning breeze, only guided by a wild warm heart".

== Critical reception ==
The song met with positive reviews. "Memórias Futuras" said: "It is impossible to not like this voice! People can say whatever they want, but this is pure talent, it doesn't need arrangements! Everything we need is there!".

== Music video ==
The music video for the song was shot in August 2008 and premiered on September 24, 2008 on Blim Records official YouTube channel. The concept for the video is really simple, it features simple images of Aurea with different and contrasting outfits and hair styles walking and singing around in a theater. In the video, we can also see images of Aurea singing in front of a microphone.

The video gained popularity, because Aurea could express her feelings according to the song's theme. To date, the video has been seen more than 2 000 000 times on YouTube.

== Live performances ==
Aurea performed the song live in the Morangomania show, a concert created by Portuguese soap opera "Morangos com Açúcar". The song was also used in the soundtrack for that same soap opera.

== Track listings ==
Digital download

1. "Okay Alright"

== Credits and personnel ==
- Aurea: Vocals, writing.
- Rui Ribeiro: Producer, mixer, recorder, programmer, guitar, bass, keyboard, writing.

== Release history ==
Region	Date	Format
Portugal	August 2008	Digital download

== Charts ==
Chart (2008) ^{1}	Peak position
Portugal Singles Chart	11
