= Busy for Me =

Single by Aurea

from the album Aurea
- Released: August 6, 2010
- Recorded: February 2009
- Genre: Blue-eyed soul, jazz, soul
- Length: 4:01
- Label: Blim Records
- Songwriters: Rui Ribeiro, Aurea
- Producers: Ricardo Ferreira, Rui Ribeiro, Aurea

Aurea singles chronology
"Okay Alright" (2008)	"Busy for Me" (2010)	"No No No No (I Don't Want Fall In Love With You Baby)" (2011)

"Busy for Me" is a soul song performed by Portuguese blue-eyed soul singer Aurea, released as the first single from her debut album, Aurea (2010). Co-written by Rui Ribeiro and Aurea and produced by Ricardo Reis and Carlos Silva, it was released in 2010 in Portugal to favourable reviews and moderate success. As Aurea's first national release, the song is credited with firmly establishing the singer's career and is now considered her signature song. "Busy for Me" received comparisons to Aurea's previous single, "Okay Alright". Critical reviewers of "Busy for Me" noted similarities between the song and releases by Aretha Franklin, Dusty Springfield and The Supremes, as well as contemporaries such as British singer Amy Winehouse or Duffy.

Aurea performed the song on her special TV broadcast transmitted by RTP2 in December 2010. The song was also performed on TV shows, such as the "Diário da Manhã" or "Boa Tarde".

A music video for the single, which was directed by Rui Afonso, was released on August 6, 2010. It was inspired by Aurea's ex-boyfriend, as well by her past relationships. The music video portrays Aurea with a group of musicians in a club, playing to the song. It is interspersed with scenes of Aurea at her home crying.

== Background and composition ==
"Busy for Me"
Co-written by Aurea and produced by Rui Ribeiro, the jazz styled ballad became Aurea's first number one single in Portugal.

The song was released in 2010 as the lead single of her debut album "Aurea". Aurea started singing while studying in the University of Évora, where she met Rui Ribeiro, who heard her singing a song and playing piano. Rui Ribeiro composed a song for Aurea and asked if she would like to sing it. They recorded a demo for it and Ribeiro sent it to Blim Records, her future record label. They enjoyed her voice and decided to "go far with it!", by recording an album. She said to "Expressões Lusitanas" during and interview: "I think singing in English is better than singing in Portuguese (...) because Soul music was "born" in England" she also said she feels influenced by Soul artists such as Aretha Franklin and Amy Winehouse.

"Busy for Me" is set in common time, with a tempo of 100 beats per minute and is written in the key of A Major. Aurea's vocal range spans from C♯_{4} to C♯_{6}. Lyrically, "Busy for Me" talks about a woman who's depressed because of her boyfriend, who rejected her, as she says in the line "I Try Everyday / I Cry Every Night / For a Second Of Your Time / But You´re So Busy for Me / You Don´t Care For My Plea / So I Cry, Cry, Cry, Cry...".

== Reception ==
=== Critical reaction ===
"Busy for Me" garnered almost unanimously positive reviews from critics, often being praised for its catchy baseline and "summery", jazzy themes. Nuno Costa from "O Melhor e o Pior" gave the song a favourable review and said: "What a great voice! Our country [Portugal] might be small but it is full of talent! Congratulations, great voice!" "Vida com Chocolate" also gave a favourable review and said: "This girl is from Santiago de Cacém! Great national voice we have here!". "Blim Records" said: "good to listen whenever we want... so good and intense". "Seven Foot Sounds" said: "Her debut single "Okay Alright" didn’t do much, but Busy (For Me) sounds a lot better and it is able to get the buzz around her starting. She at least has the potential!"

== Music video ==
=== Background and synopsis ===
The music video for the song was produced by Ricardo Reis and Carlos Silva, directed by Rui Afonso and was shot in July 2010. The video premiered on August 6, 2010, on Blim Records' official YouTube account. As of May 2018, the video had more than four million views on Blim Records' official YouTube account. The concept for the music video is really simple and Aurea said she wanted to go simple with it.

The video begins with Aurea looking depressed and locked in her own home, drinking coffee and thinking about her boyfriend. Then, we can see Aurea singing in a night club, while her voice is softly driven by a piano. While this is happening, the video shows images of Aurea at her home at the same time. Then, when she sings the line "I tried to pick you up", Aurea is seen in front of her boyfriend's apartment, trying to talk to him. After this, she goes to a disco, where she finds her boyfriend and starts arguing with him. He suddenly leaves the disco and Aurea follows him to the door, where she tries to convince him he's wrong and he needs to come back to her. In the end of the second chorus, we can see Aurea trying to kill herself, by drowning herself in a tub. After this, Aurea is seen in the middle of the street crying all alone. The video ends with images of Aurea in the club.

== Live performances ==
Aurea performed the song live a lot of times. She performed the song in September 2010, while giving an interview to Portuguese journalist Conceição Lino. The song was also performed in the following week on the TVI's program "Diário da Manhã". She performed an acoustic version of the song at the Radio FM station in October 2010. This version of the song was played a lot of times in Portugal on most Portuguese radio stations. Aurea made an especial broadcast, which was transmitted on RTP2 in December 2010. During the show, Aurea performed a lot of songs from her first album, including "Busy for Me", accompanied by a comment made by Aurea. The artist performed the song at the RTP2 TV show "5 Para a Meia-Noite" on February 3, 2011.

The song was also used on TVI's show "Deluxe" a lot of times during the summer. The song also appears on a Rádio Comercial TV ad, as well as on a Portugal Telecom's Sapo Music Box TV ad.

== Track listings ==
Digital download

1. "Busy for Me"

== Credits and personnel ==
- Aurea: Vocals, writing.
- Rui Ribeiro: Producer, mixer, recorder, programmer, guitar, bass, keyboard, writing.

== Release history ==
Region	Date	Format
Portugal	6 August 2010	Digital download

== Charts ==
Chart (2010) ^{1}	Peak position
Hungary (Rádiós Top 40)	30
Portugal Singles Chart	1
