= Carlão (rapper) =

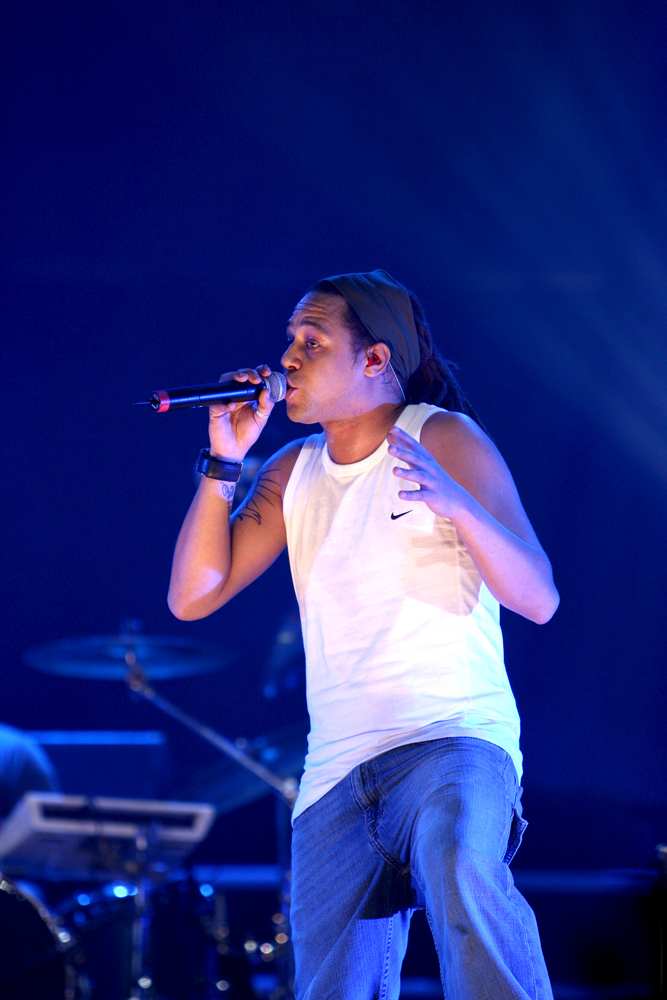
- Carlão in 2007

Background information
- Also known as: Carlão, Pacman
- Born: 20 July 1975 (age 50); Huambo, Angola
- Genres: Hip hop, Rap rock, Hip hop tuga
- Instruments: Vocals
- Years active: 1993–present
- Member of: Da Weasel

Carlos Nobre (born 20 July 1975), known professionally as Carlão and formerly Pacman, is an Angolan-born Portuguese rapper and songwriter. He is known for being a founding member in the Portuguese hip-hop band Da Weasel.

== Early life ==
Carlos Nobre was born in Huambo, Angola in 1975 to Cape Verdean parents. Shortly after being born, Nobre moved to the freguesia of Cacilhas, in Almada, Portugal. After garnering an interest in music in his early teenage years, Nobre founded Da Weasel in 1993.

== Career ==
=== Da Weasel ===
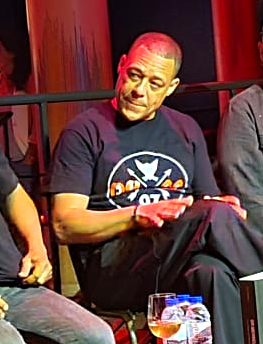
Carlão in 2023

In 1993, Nobre founded the band Da Weasel. Upon its founding, Nobre took on the stage name of Pacman, and later Carlão. The band incorporates elements of hip-hop and rap. Additionally, it is known for being one of the founding Portuguese bands in the genre. The band's debut work is the EP More Than 30 Motherfuckers, featuring only six songs, all in English. Since this release, the band has released six albums and one live album. The band broke up in 2010, before being reunited again in 2020.

With Carlão as the frontman, Da Weasel won the MTV Europe Music Award for Best Portuguese Act twice: in 2004 and 2007.

=== Solo career and The Voice Kids ===
Following Da Weasel's disbanding in 2010, Carlão has released numerous solo singles. Many songs feature other prominent Portuguese artists, such as Fernando Daniel and Carolina Deslandes.

From 2021 to 2024, Carlão was featured as a coach on the talent show The Voice Kids.

In May 2026, Carlão participated in a benefit concert in Lisbon to raise funds for the central region of Portugal, which was devastated by Storm Kristin in January 2026.

== Discography ==
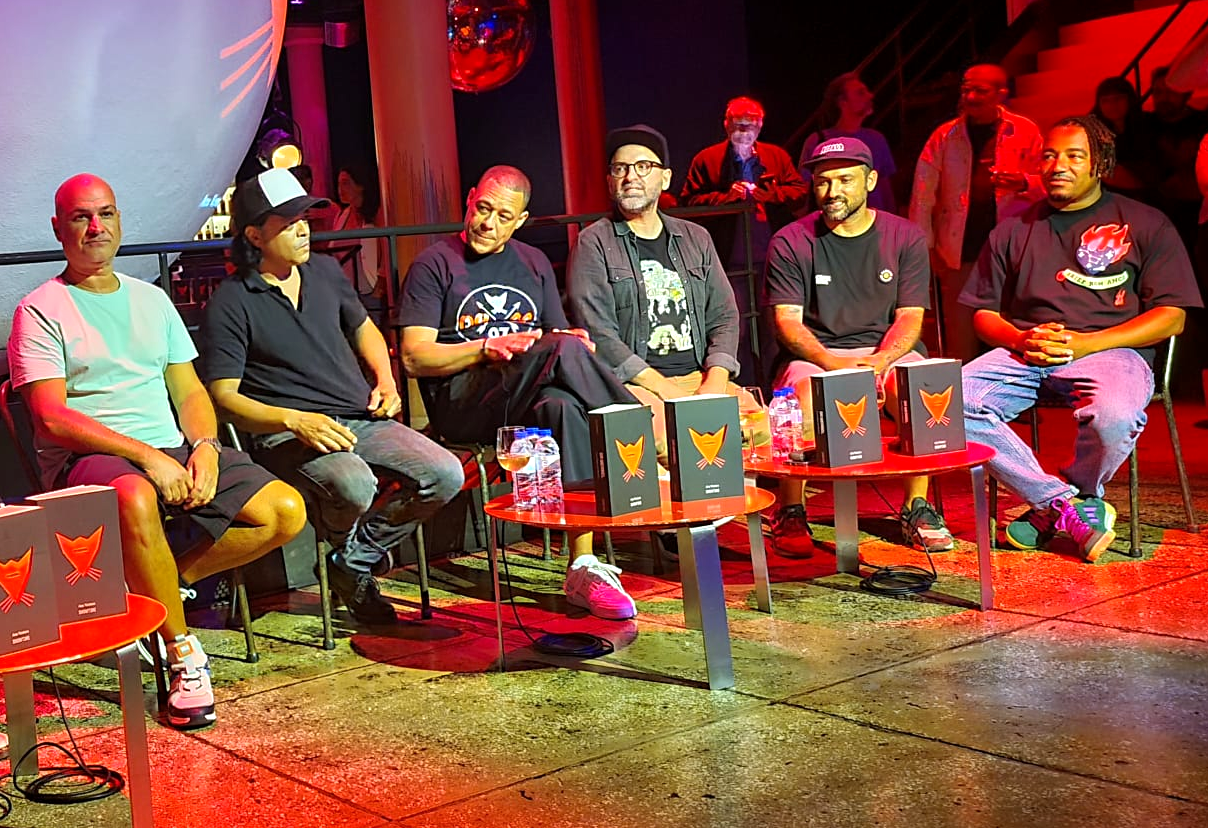
Da Weasel, with Carlão third from left, in 2023

=== Da Weasel discography ===
==== Studio albums ====
- Dou-lhe Com A Alma (1995)
- 3º Capítulo (1997)
- Iniciação A Uma Vida Banal – O Manual (1999)
- Podes Fugir Mas Não Te Podes Esconder (2001)
- Re-Definições (2004)
- Amor, Escárnio e Maldizer (2007)

==== Extended plays ====
- More Than 30 Motherf*****s (1994)

==== Live albums ====
- Ao Vivo Coliseus (2005)

=== Solo work ===
==== Albums ====
- 2011 - Os dias de Raiva
- 2015 - Quarenta
- 2016 - Na Batalha
- 2018 - Entretenimento?

==== Additional singles ====
- 2020 - Bom Rapaz
- 2022 - Nada a Perder with Fernando Daniel
- 2022 - Precipícios with Carolina Deslandes
- 2023 - MAIS!
- 2024 - Ver-te Dormir
