= I Love You (Billie Eilish song) =

2019 song by Billie Eilish

Song by Billie Eilish

from the album When We All Fall Asleep, Where Do We Go?
- Released: March 29, 2019
- Length: 4:51
- Label: Darkroom; Interscope
- Songwriters: Billie Eilish O'Connell; Finneas O'Connell
- Producer: Finneas O'Connell

"I Love You" (stylized in all lowercase) is a song by American singer Billie Eilish from her debut studio album, When We All Fall Asleep, Where Do We Go? (2019). Eilish co-wrote the song with her brother Finneas O'Connell, who also handled production. As the 13th track on the album, "I Love You" is an acoustic guitar-based ballad accompanied by various plane-related noises, where Eilish's lyrics describe the resistance to falling in love with someone.

The song received mainly positive reviews from music critics, several of whom praised the music and lyrical content. For promotional purposes, "I Love You" was performed live during Eilish's 2019 When We All Fall Asleep Tour and her 2020 Where Do We Go? World Tour, and again on her 2022 Happier Than Ever, The World Tour. When the album was released, the song reached number 53 on the US Billboard Hot 100 and charted in several other countries. It was certified platinum in the United States and Canada by the Recording Industry Association of America (RIAA) and Music Canada (MC), respectively.

== Background and release ==
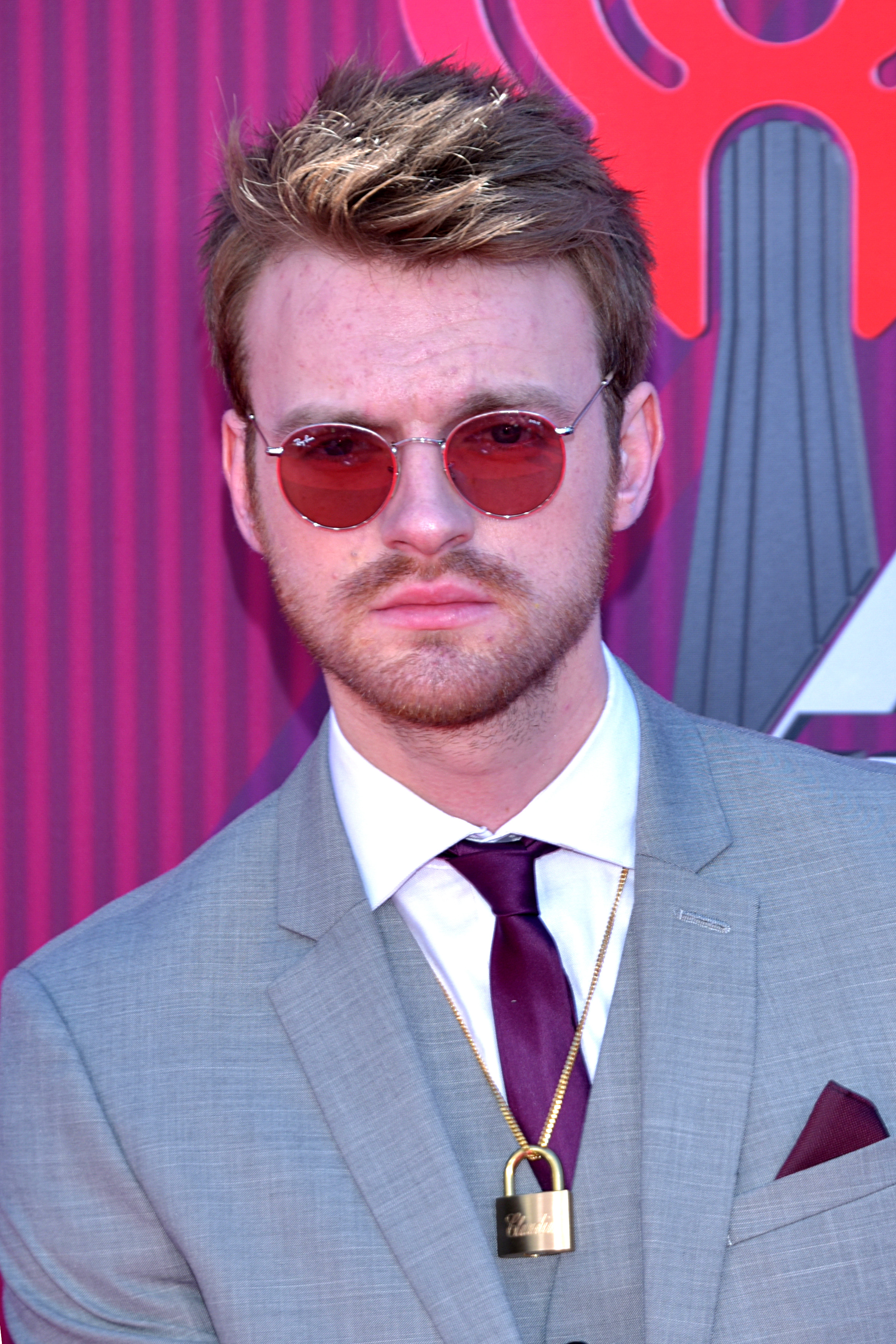
Eilish's brother Finneas O'Connell contributed to the song's writing and production.

On March 29, 2019, "I Love You" was released as the 13th track on Eilish's debut studio album When We All Fall Asleep, Where Do We Go? The song was written by the singer and her brother Finneas O'Connell, known under his stage name of Finneas, who also solely produced it. It was recorded in Finneas' bedroom studio in Highland Park, Los Angeles. Mastering and mixing was handled by studio personnel John Greenham and Rob Kinelski, respectively. Casey Cuayo received credit as studio personnel and an additional mixer. Eilish shared in an Instagram story on March 25, 2020, a playlist of her inspirations for the track, which included songs from Phoebe Bridgers, Post Malone, Ry X, XXXTentacion, Bon Iver, and Sufjan Stevens. Finneas later explained in an interview with Pitchfork that the song "was written prior to being recorded" and that the "second verse is about sitting on the tarmac on a plane".

== Composition and lyrical interpretation ==
Musically, "I Love You" runs at a "lovingly" slow tempo of 72 beats per minute (BPM), and is played in the key of C major. Eilish's vocals, which are sung quietly and treated with some reverb, span a range between the notes of G_{3} and A_{4}. Finneas also provides backing vocals by harmonizing with her throughout the song. Critical commentary described the track as an acoustic-based ballad. In the second verse, the song features the sound of a flight attendant call button pitch-shifted to follow all the chords. Craig Jenkins of Vulture called it a "dark" song, reminiscent of Lana Del Rey's Born to Die and Halsey's Badlands. Chris DeVille, writing for Stereogum, noted that the song finds Eilish "in a world wrecked by tragedy". According to Thomas Smith of NME, "Listen Before I Go", "I Love You", and "Goodbye" provided a "melancholy end close" to the album.

Lyrically, the song features Eilish determinedly trying not to be in love with someone and convincing them they shouldn't love her either: "Maybe won't you take it back/Say you were tryna make me laugh/And nothing has to change today/You didn't mean to say 'I love you'/I love you and I don't want to." The faint voice of an airline attendant and the sound of a plane taking off can be heard during the second verse, which includes the lyrics: "Up all night on another red eye/I wish we never learned to fly/Maybe we should just try/To tell ourselves a good lie/I didn't mean to make you cry." Spencer Kornhaber of The Atlantic put forward the idea of the track as "draw[ing] a clear and breathtaking division between two modes: wanting to be too cool for desire and actually experiencing desire". Finneas revealed in a tweet that "I Love You" is one of his favorite songs he and Eilish wrote: "It's very sincere, and a thing that I've been trying to write about for a long time — which is, when you fall in love with someone and it's a drag."

== Reception ==
"I Love You" received mainly positive reviews from music critics. The song was praised by Insider's Libby Torres, who called the track "heart-wrenching" and "serene", and opined that its lyrics feel "like you're in the hazy eye of a storm". Sam Prance of AllMusic viewed the song as a "heartbreaking acoustic beauty that pegs Eilish as something more than a spooky, scare-the-parents gimmick". Madeline Roth of MTV called it a "gorgeous penultimate track". Jon Pareles of The New York Times commended the lyrical content, which he described as a "hovering, hesitant confession". Jason Lipshutz of Billboard commended the lyrics and melody, which he described as a "obsessive-romantic anthem". Vulture's Jenkins said "I Love You" was one of "the album’s best songs", while Chris Willman of Variety viewed the track as "gorgeous" and "hopeful". Yasmin Cowan of Clash said the track would "bring [anyone] close to tears". Curtis Dinwiddie of The Eastern Echo illustrated "I Love You" as "soft" and "charismatic". Tanis Smither of Earmilk labeled "I Love You" as a "stunning slow-burner". In a negative review, The Guardian's Laura Snapes mentions that the song sounds "suspiciously" like Leonard Cohen's "Hallelujah" and is "better off left to YouTube ingenues than an artist of Eilish’s otherwise clear vision".

Following the release of When We All Fall Asleep, Where Do We Go?, "I Love You" debuted at number 53 on the US Billboard Hot 100. At the same time, Eilish broke the record of most simultaneous Hot 100 entries for a female artist. The song also attained top 100 positions in various other countries, including Australia, Canada, Sweden, Norway, New Zealand, and the Netherlands. After Eilish performed the song on Saturday Night Live, it experienced a surge in iTunes download sales and entered the US Billboard Digital Song Sales chart at number 41. The song has notably been awarded a platinum certification in the United States and Canada by the Recording Industry Association of America (RIAA) and Music Canada (MC), respectively.

== Live performances and other usage ==
Eilish performed the track at the Coachella Valley Music and Arts Festival on April 20, 2019, and later that year at the Glastonbury Festival on June 30. "I Love You" was included on the setlist of Eilish's When We All Fall Asleep Tour (2019). It was also performed by her at Pukkelpop in August of the same year. On August 12, 2019, a live version of "I Love You" was uploaded to Eilish's YouTube channel. This performance was filmed in Los Angeles at the Greek Theatre and it shows Eilish sitting on a bed with Finneas, while he plays the track on an acoustic guitar. The stadium is lit up by the lights from thousands of fans' mobile phones as the siblings rise slowly above the stage, backed by cloudy night sky visuals. During the conclusion of the track, the bed that the two of them sat on is lowered in front of a giant full moon. On September 29, 2019, Eilish appeared on the 45th-season premiere of Saturday Night Live, performing an acoustic version of the track with Finneas. She further sang "I Love You" on her Where Do We Go? World Tour (2020). The song was used in an episode of the British soap opera Hollyoaks. In April 2020 singer and guitarist Jeff Tweedy, of the American band Wilco, covered "I Love You" on an acoustic guitar for the 16th episode of his livestream podcast, The Tweedy Show. Tweedy later covered the track again on July 28 for the 77th episode of his podcast.

== Credits and personnel ==
Credits adapted from Tidal and the liner notes of When We All Fall Asleep, Where Do We Go?

- Billie Eilish – vocals, songwriter
- Finneas O'Connell – producer, songwriter, backing vocals
- John Greenham – mastering engineer, studio personnel
- Rob Kinelski – mixer, studio personnel
- Casey Cuayo – assistant mixer, studio personnel

== Charts ==
Chart performance for "I Love You"
| Chart (2019) | Peak position |
|---|---|
| Australia (ARIA) | 20 |
| Belgium (Ultratip Bubbling Under Flanders) | 31 |
| Canada Hot 100 (Billboard) | 35 |
| Czech Republic Singles Digital (ČNS IFPI) | 35 |
| Estonia (Eesti Tipp-40) | 12 |
| Greece (IFPI) | 28 |
| Hungary (Stream Top 40) | 31 |
| Ireland (IRMA) | 73 |
| Latvia (LAIPA) | 14 |
| Lithuania (AGATA) | 17 |
| Netherlands (Single Top 100) | 61 |
| New Zealand (Recorded Music NZ) | 39 |
| Norway (VG-lista) | 38 |
| Portugal (AFP) | 50 |
| Slovakia Singles Digital (ČNS IFPI) | 21 |
| Sweden (Sverigetopplistan) | 47 |
| UK Audio Streaming (OCC) | 40 |
| US Billboard Hot 100 | 53 |

== Certifications ==
Certifications and sales for "I Love You"
| Region | Certification | Certified units/sales |
|---|---|---|
| Australia (ARIA) | 4× Platinum | 280,000^{‡} |
| Austria (IFPI Austria) | Platinum | 30,000^{‡} |
| Brazil (Pro-Música Brasil) | Diamond | 160,000^{‡} |
| Canada (Music Canada) | 5× Platinum | 400,000^{‡} |
| Denmark (IFPI Danmark) | Platinum | 90,000^{‡} |
| France (SNEP) | Diamond | 333,333^{‡} |
| Italy (FIMI) | Gold | 35,000^{‡} |
| Mexico (AMPROFON) | Gold | 30,000^{‡} |
| New Zealand (RMNZ) | 3× Platinum | 90,000^{‡} |
| Norway (IFPI Norway) | Gold | 30,000^{‡} |
| Poland (ZPAV) | Platinum | 20,000^{‡} |
| Portugal (AFP) | Platinum | 10,000^{‡} |
| Spain (PROMUSICAE) | Platinum | 60,000^{‡} |
| United Kingdom (BPI) | Platinum | 600,000^{‡} |
| United States (RIAA) | Platinum | 1,000,000^{‡} |
^{‡} Sales+streaming figures based on certification alone.
