= Aurea (singer) =

Portuguese singer (born 1987)

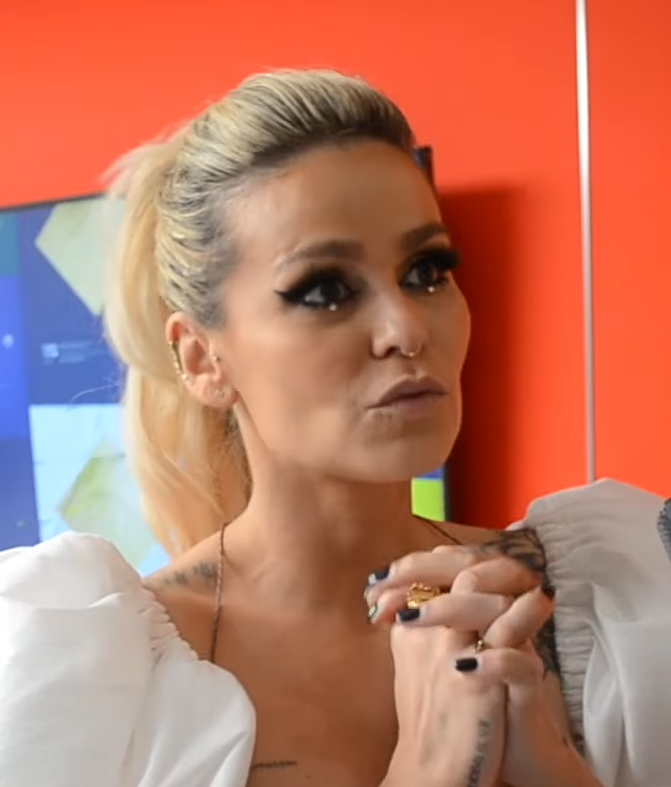
- Aurea in 2022

Background information
- Born: Aurea Sousa; 7 September 1987 (age 38); Santiago do Cacém, Portugal
- Origin: Alvalade do Sado, Portugal
- Genres: Soul; blues; pop; reggae; R&B; blue-eyed soul
- Occupation: Singer
- Instrument: Vocal
- Years active: 2008–present
- Labels: Blim; Sony

Áurea Isabel Ramos de Sousa (born 7 September 1987), known professionally as Aurea (Portuguese pronunciation: [ˈawɾi.ɐ]), is a Portuguese soul singer originally from Santiago do Cacém, Alentejo, who grew up in Silves, Algarve. She debuted in 2008 with her single "Okay Alright", which was included on the soundtrack of the Portuguese television series Morangos com Açúcar. At the end of 2008, she performed the song live at the Morangos Live Festival, along with two other cover duets. This concert was released on DVD in 2009. Aurea released her debut album, Aurea, in September 2010. The album entered at number 21 at the Portuguese Albums Chart, but quickly reached number 1. It features the number "Busy for Me", which was released as the album's lead single.

In December 2010, Aurea made a special live TV broadcast to promote some of her songs. It was transmitted by RTP2 and SIC Notícias. Her single "Busy for Me", released in August 2010, became her first number one single; it topped the Portuguese iTunes chart. This has been credited with firmly establishing the singer's career and is now considered her signature song. Critical reviews noted similarities between the song and releases by Aretha Franklin, Dusty Springfield and The Supremes, as well as contemporaries such as British singer Amy Winehouse or Duffy. During the following year (2011), Aurea made a concert tour around the country to promote her debut album. She sold out all the major national venues and the album remained on the top Portuguese charts for 71 weeks. From 2015 to 2022, she was a coach on The Voice Portugal. In 2023, she was featured as a coach on The Voice Kids Portugal.

Aurea sings in English. As of 2016, the only songs she has released alone in a language other than English is the theme song of TVI's telenovela A Impostora (The Impostor) (2016–17), and "Frágil" ("Fragile"), which she recorded in her native Portuguese language.

== Life and career ==
=== 1990s–2009: Early life and career beginnings ===
Aurea was born in Santiago do Cacém, Alentejo, and grew up in Silves, Algarve. Since she was a child, she realized she wanted to be a singer or actress and she participated in many plays at school. Aurea went to Évora's university, where she studied performing arts. In 2008, Aurea met Rui Ribeiro at the university, who heard her singing. He helped her to release her first single in 2008 through Blim Records, "Okay Alright". The song was included on the soundtrack of the Portuguese soap opera Morangos com Açúcar. In the summer of 2008, she performed the song live at the Morangomania Festival, a show created by the production team of Morangos com Açúcar. In early 2009, Rui Ribeiro composed a song for Aurea and asked if she would like to sing it. They recorded a demo for it and Ribeiro sent it to Blim Records, her future record label. They enjoyed her voice and decided to "go far with it!", by recording an album.

=== 2009–present: Career breakthrough and Aurea ===
In summer 2010, Aurea said to "Expressões Lusitanas" during an interview: "I think singing in English is better than singing in Portuguese (...) because Soul music was "born" through English words". She also said she feels influenced by Soul artists such as Aretha Franklin, Joss Stone, James Morrison and Amy Winehouse (like Joss Stone, she frequently performs barefoot). Aurea released a single in August 2010, entitled "Busy for Me", a blue-eyed soul ballad influenced by artists such as Aretha Franklin and Amy Winehouse. The song received positive reviews from music critics. Aurea performed her songs on a TV Special broadcast among many other shows on Portuguese television.

A music video for the single, which was directed by Ricardo Reis, was released on 6 August 2010. Aurea was released in September 2010. Rui Ribeiro was responsible for the composition of nine of the original songs from the album, as well as all the original lyrics. It is a pop/soul recording but with many influences of many different musical styles. As with Aurea herself, this work is musically eclectic. The album was produced by Ricardo Ferreira and Rui Ribeiro. The album entered at number 21 on the Portuguese Albums Chart, but quickly reached number 1. "Busy for Me" was chosen as the album's lead single.

== Awards ==
Award	Year	Cat
Female Personality of the Year, by Lux Magazine (Portugal)	2010	Won
Golden Globe (Portugal) – Best Individual Performer	2011	Won
Golden Globe (Portugal) – Best Song: Busy (for me)	2011	Nominated
Golden Globe (Portugal) – Revelation of the year	2011	Nominated
MTV Europe Music Awards 2011 – Best Portuguese Act	2011	Won
MTV Europe Music Award for Best European Act	2011	Nominated
MTV Europe Music Awards 2012 – Best Portuguese Act	2012	Won
MTV Europe Music Award for Best European Act	2012	Nominated
MTV Europe Music Award for Best Portuguese Act	2016	Nominated
Portuguese Television Awards for Best music	2018	Won

== Discography ==
Studio albums

- Aurea (2010)
- Soul Notes (2012)
- Restart (2016)
- Confessions (2018)
- Moods (2023)

Live albums

- Ao Vivo no Coliseu dos Recreios (2011)

Singles

- "Okay Alright" (2008)
- "Busy for Me" (2010)
- "No No No No (I Don't Want Fall In Love With You Baby)" (2011)
- "The Only Thing That I Wanted " (2011)
- "Where Is The Love" (ft. Nikolas Takács)
- "Scratch My Back" (2012)
- "Nothing Left to Say" (2013)
- "How Far Would You Go" (2013)
- "I Didn't Mean It" (2016)
- "A Impostora" (2016)
- "I Feel Love Inside" (ft. Enoque) (2017)
- "Done With You" (2018)
- "Thrill Seeker" (2018)
- "Hide" (2018)
- "Head Over Heels" (2018)
- Frágil (2021)
- Why? (2022)

=== Studio albums ===
Year	Title	Chart positions	Certifications (sales thresholds)
Year	Title	POR	Certifications (sales thresholds)
2010	Aurea: 1st studio album	1	AFP: Double Platinum
2011	Ao Vivo No Coliseu dos Recreios	8	AFP: Platinum
2012	Soul Notes: 2nd studio album	5	AFP: Platinum
2016	Restart: 3rd studio album	1	AFP: Gold
2018	Confessions: 4th studio album	1	
2019	9: 1st studio album by Elas (project with Marisa Liz)	3	
2023	Moods: 5th studio album	5	

=== Singles ===
Year	Song	Peak chart positions			Album
Year	Song	POR	HUN	BR	Album
2008	"Okay Alright"	1	–	–	Aurea
2010	"Busy for Me"	1	30	15	Aurea
2011	"Busy (for me)" (Club Mix)	46	–	–	Aurea
2011	"Where Is The Love?" (feat. Nikolas Takács)	34	35	–	Aurea
2011	"Dream a Little Dream of Me"	21	–	–	Aurea
2012	"Scratch My Back"	1	–	18	Soul Notes
2013	"Heading Back Home" (feat. Paulo Sousa)	1	–	–	Soul Notes
2013	"Nothing Left to Say"	1	–	–	Soul Notes
2013	"How Far Would You Go?"	23	–	–	RPG soundtrack
2013	"The Star"	36	–	–	Soul Notes
2014	"Wonder Why" (feat. The Black Mamba)	1	–	–	The Black Mamba's "Dirty Little Brother"
2016	"I Didn't Mean It"	1	–	–	Restart
2016	"A Impostora"	4	–	–	A Impostora soundtrack
2017	"I Feel Love Inside" (feat. Enoque)	1	–	–	Restart
2018	"Done With You"	1	–	–	Confessions
2018	"Thrill Seeker"	1	–	–	Confessions
2018	"Hide"	34	–	–	Confessions
2018	"Head Over Heels"	1	–	–	Confessions
2019	"Eu Gosto de Ti"	1	–	–	9 (with Marisa Liz)
2021	"Frágil"	1	–	–	non-album track
2022	"Recomeço" (feat. Marco Rodrigues)	4	–	–	Marco Rodrigues' Special Edition of "Judite"
2022	"Volta" (feat. António Zambujo)	1	–	–	Moods
