= Amor Electro =

Portuguese band

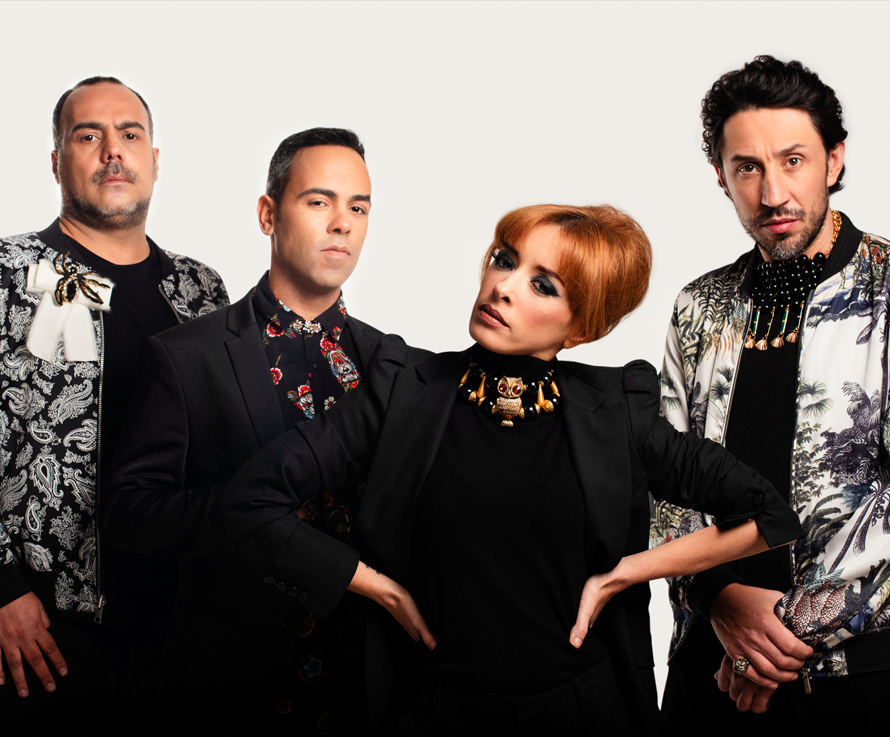

Background information
- Origin: Portugal
- Genres: pop rock
- Years active: 2010-present
- Labels: Arthouse; Valentim de Carvalho
- Members: Marisa Liz; Tiago Pais Dias; Ricardo Vasconcelos; Mauro Ramos
- Past members: Rui Rechena (deceased)

Amor Electro are a Portuguese pop band formed in Lisbon in 2010. The first lineup of the group consisted of Marisa Liz (vocalist), Tiago Pais Dias (guitar and multi-instrumentalist), Ricardo Vasconcelos (keyboards), Rui Rechena (bass) and Mauro Ramos (drums).

The band blends pop music and electronic music with Portuguese traditional music, using typical instruments like the accordion and Portuguese guitar. They also revisit themes from the 1980s and the 1990s Portuguese pop/rock, playing versions of songs by Sétima Legião, GNR, Ornatos Violeta and other bands, besides their own original songs. The band's first album, Cai o Carmo e a Trindade, was released in May 2011, and reached the top of Portuguese sales charts soon after. The second album, Яevolução, was released on 21 October 2013.

Amor Electro were nominated for the MTV Europe Music Award for Best Portuguese Act at the 2011, 2012 and the 2014 MTV Europe Music Awards.

== Discography ==
- Cai o Carmo e a Trindade (2011)
- Яevolução (2013)
- # 4 (2018)
