= Carolina Deslandes =

Portuguese singer (born 1991)

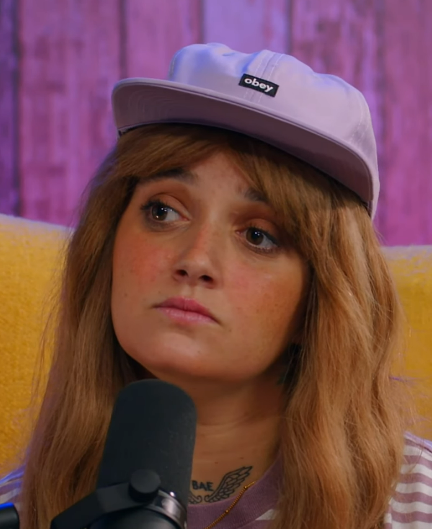
- Deslandes in 2022

Background information
- Born: Maria Carolina Martinez Deslandes; 27 August 1991 (age 35); Lisbon, Portugal
- Genres: Pop, Ballad, Soul
- Occupations: Singer, songwriter
- Instrument: Vocals

Maria Carolina Martinez Deslandes (born 27 August 1991), known as Carolina Deslandes, is a Portuguese singer and songwriter. In December 2010, she finished as the third-place finalist on the fourth season of Ídolos Portugal. She has released three albums: Carolina Deslandes (2012), Blossom (2016) and Casa (2018). "A Vida Toda" (2017), a single from Casa, reached number nine on the Portuguese Singles Chart and, as of August 2024 its music video has more than 12.8 million views on YouTube.

== Career ==
In 2021, Deslandes was confirmed to be taking part in Festival da Canção 2021, with the song "Por um triz".

From 2021 to 2022, Deslandes was a coach on The Voice Kids Portugal. Deslandes served as a coach on the adult version, The Voice Portugal, alongside Marisa Liz, Dino d'Santiago, and Diogo Piçarra for the tenth season that aired from 2022 to 2023.

== Ídolos ==
Solo performances:
Stage	Song choice	Original artist	Result
Audition	"Problema de Expressão" "A Woman's Worth"	Clã; Alicia Keys	Advanced
Teatro	"Super Duper Love (Are You Diggin' on Me)"	Joss Stone	Advanced
Teatro	"This Love"	Maroon 5	Advanced
Teatro	"Ordinary People"	John Legend	Advanced
1st Gala	"Ain't No Other Man"	Christina Aguilera	Safe
2nd Gala	"Master Blaster"	Stevie Wonder	Safe
3rd Gala	"Angel"	Sarah McLachlan	Safe
4th Gala	"Beggin'"	Madcon	Safe
5th Gala	"Canção de Alterne"	Rui Veloso	Safe
6th Gala	"Karma"	Alicia Keys	Safe
7th Gala	"Teenage Dream" "The Blower's Daughter"	Katy Perry; Damien Rice	Safe
8th Gala	"Sex On Fire" "Problema de Expressão"	Kings of Leon; Clã	Safe
9th Gala	"It's a Man's World" "I'm Outta Love" "Cara de Anjo Mau"	James Brown; Anastacia; Jorge Palma	Third-place
Final	"Empire State of Mind (Part II) Broken Down"	Alicia Keys	–

== Discography ==
=== Studio albums ===
Title	Details	Peak chart positions
Title	Details	POR
Carolina Deslandes	Released: 22 October 2012; Label: Farol; Formats: CD, digital download	21
Blossom	Released: 19 February 2016; Label: Farol; Formats: CD, digital download	16
Casa	Released: 20 April 2018; Label: Universal Music Portugal; Formats: CD, digital download	1

=== Singles ===
Title	Year	Peak chart positions	Album
Title	Year	POR	Album
"A vida toda"	2017	9	Casa
"Casa"	2018	92	Casa
"Não me importo"	2020	90	Mulher
"Por um triz"	2021	—	Non-album single
