= List of number-one albums of 2011 (Portugal) =

The Portuguese Albums Chart ranks the best-performing albums in Portugal, as compiled by the Associação Fonográfica Portuguesa.

Number-one albums in Portugal
← 2010 • 2011 • 2012 →

Week	Album	Artist	Reference
01/2011	O Mesmo de Sempre	Tony Carreira	
02/2011	O Mesmo de Sempre	Tony Carreira	
03/2011	O Mesmo de Sempre	Tony Carreira	
04/2011	Live on Ten Legs	Pearl Jam	
05/2011	Aurea	Aurea	
06/2011	Aurea	Aurea	
07/2011	Aurea	Aurea	
08/2011	Aurea	Aurea	
09/2011	Aurea	Aurea	
10/2011	Aurea	Aurea	
11/2011	Aurea	Aurea	
12/2011	Aurea	Aurea	
13/2011	Explode	The Gift	
14/2011	Explode	The Gift	
15/2011	Aurea	Aurea	
16/2011	Aurea	Aurea	
17/2011	Aurea	Aurea	
18/2011	Pára, Escuta e Olha	André Sardet	
19/2011	Cai o Carmo e a Trindade	Amor Electro	
20/2011	Cai o Carmo e a Trindade	Amor Electro	
21/2011	Cai o Carmo e a Trindade	Amor Electro	
22/2011	Born This Way	Lady Gaga	
23/2011	Ukulele Songs	Eddie Vedder	
24/2011	Cai o Carmo e a Trindade	Amor Electro	
25/2011	Cai o Carmo e a Trindade	Amor Electro	
26/2011	Cai o Carmo e a Trindade	Amor Electro	
27/2011	Cai o Carmo e a Trindade	Amor Electro	
28/2011	Angélico	Angélico	
29/2011	Angélico	Angélico	
30/2011	Angélico	Angélico	
31/2011	Voos Domésticos	GNR	
32/2011	O Mesmo de Sempre	Tony Carreira	
33/2011	O Mesmo de Sempre	Tony Carreira	
34/2011	O Mesmo de Sempre	Tony Carreira	
35/2011	Ao Vivo	Paula Fernandes	
36/2011	Ao Vivo	Paula Fernandes	
37/2011	Nothing but the Beat	David Guetta	
38/2011	Mútuo Consentimento	Sérgio Godinho	
39/2011	Pearl Jam Twenty	Pearl Jam	
40/2011	Nevermind	Nirvana	
41/2011	Nevermind	Nirvana	
42/2011	Panda Vai à Escola n°4	Panda	
43/2011	N.1	David Carreira	
44/2011	Mylo Xyloto	Coldplay	
45/2011	Mylo Xyloto	Coldplay	
46/2011	Mylo Xyloto	Coldplay	
47/2011	Christmas	Michael Bublé	
48/2011	Em Busca das Montanhas Azuis	Fausto Bordalo Dias	
49/2011	A Montanha Mágica	Rodrigo Leão	
50/2011	Lioness: Hidden Treasures	Amy Winehouse	
51/2011	Lioness: Hidden Treasures	Amy Winehouse	
52/2011	Live at the Royal Albert Hall	Adele	
53/2011	En Acústico	Pablo Alborán	
