= A força está em nós =

Studio album by David Carreira
- Released: 11 November 2013
- Genre: Pop, rock, dance, hip hop, R&B
- Language: Portuguese, English, French,
- Label: Farol Música

David Carreira chronology
N.1 (2011)	A força está em nós (2013)	Tout recommencer (2014)

A força está em nós (English: The strength is in us) is the second studio album of the French-born Portuguese singer David Carreira. It was released on 11 November 2013 on the Portuguese Farol Música label and reached number 2 on the official Portuguese Albums Chart.

== Track list ==
No.	Title	Length
1.	"Boom"	4:04
2.	"Baby Fica"	3:55
3.	"A Força Está Em Nós" (featuring Snoop Dogg)	3:07
4.	"Fallin' For U Girl" (featuring Diana Chaves)	3:08
5.	"O Tempo Não Volta"	5:40
6.	"Vem P'ra Cá (Put It On Me)" (featuring Dalvin)	3:19
7.	"ABC" (featuring Boss AC)	4:17
8.	"És Tu"	4:20
9.	"À Espera"	3:36
10.	"Deixa Balançar"	3:23
11.	"Oeo"	3:21
12.	"Baby Fica (live)" (featuring Anselmo Ralph)	4:03

== Charts ==
Chart (2011)	Peak position
Portuguese Albums Chart	2
