= List of number-one albums of 2004 (Portugal) =

The Portuguese Albums Chart ranks the best-performing albums in Portugal, as compiled by the Associação Fonográfica Portuguesa.

Number-one albums in Portugal
← 2003 • 2004 • 2005 →

Week	Album	Artist	Reference
1/2004	O Concerto Acústico	Rui Veloso	
2/2004	Maria Rita	Maria Rita	
3/2004	Maria Rita	Maria Rita	
4/2004	Maria Rita	Maria Rita	
5/2004	Maria Rita	Maria Rita	
6/2004	Fallen	Evanescence	
7/2004	Feels Like Home	Norah Jones	
8/2004	Feels Like Home	Norah Jones	
9/2004	Feels Like Home	Norah Jones	
10/2004	Feels Like Home	Norah Jones	
11/2004	The Voice	Russel Watson	
12/2004	The Voice	Russel Watson	
13/2004	The Voice	Russel Watson	
14/2004	The Voice	Russel Watson	
15/2004	The Girl in the Other Room	Diana Krall	
16/2004	The Girl in the Other Room	Diana Krall	
17/2004	The Girl in the Other Room	Diana Krall	
18/2004	The Girl in the Other Room	Diana Krall	
19/2004	The Girl in the Other Room	Diana Krall	
20/2004	The Girl in the Other Room	Diana Krall	
21/2004	Um Amor Infinito	Madredeus	
22/2004	Um Amor Infinito	Madredeus	
23/2004	Um Amor Infinito	Madredeus	
24/2004	O Mundo ao Contrário	Xutos & Pontapés	
25/2004	O Mundo ao Contrário	Xutos & Pontapés	
26/2004	O Mundo ao Contrário	Xutos & Pontapés	
27/2004	Cinema	Rodrigo Leão	
28/2004	Adriana Partimpim	Adriana Calcanhoto	
29/2004	Adriana Partimpim	Adriana Calcanhoto	
30/2004	Adriana Partimpim	Adriana Calcanhoto	
31/2004	Adriana Partimpim	Adriana Calcanhoto	
32/2004	Adriana Partimpim	Adriana Calcanhoto	
33/2004	Adriana Partimpim	Adriana Calcanhoto	
34/2004	Adriana Partimpim	Adriana Calcanhoto	
35/2004	DiscO-Zone	O-Zone	
36/2004	DiscO-Zone	O-Zone	
37/2004	DiscO-Zone	O-Zone	
38/2004	DiscO-Zone	O-Zone	
39/2004	DiscO-Zone	O-Zone	
40/2004	DiscO-Zone	O-Zone	
41/2004	DiscO-Zone	O-Zone	
42/2004	DiscO-Zone	O-Zone	
43/2004	Greatest Hits	Robbie Williams	
44/2004	Greatest Hits	Robbie Williams	
45/2004	Greatest Hits	Robbie Williams	
46/2004	Love Songs: A Compilation... Old and New	Phil Collins	
47/2004	Love Songs: A Compilation... Old and New	Phil Collins	
48/2004	How to Dismantle an Atomic Bomb	U2	
49/2004	How to Dismantle an Atomic Bomb	U2	
50/2004	How to Dismantle an Atomic Bomb	U2	
51/2004	How to Dismantle an Atomic Bomb	U2	
52/2004	Best 1991-2004	Seal	
