= List of number-one albums of 2016 (Portugal) =

The Portuguese Albums Chart ranks the best-performing albums in Portugal, as compiled by the Associação Fonográfica Portuguesa.

Number-one albums in Portugal
← 2015 • 2016 • 2017 →

Week	Album	Artist	Reference
1/2016	25	Adele	
2/2016	Blackstar	David Bowie	
3/2016	Blackstar	David Bowie	
4/2016	Blackstar	David Bowie	
5/2016	Blackstar	David Bowie	
6/2016	Blackstar	David Bowie	
7/2016	Blackstar	David Bowie	
8/2016	Outras Histórias	Deolinda	
9/2016	Outras Histórias	Deolinda	
10/2016	Outras Histórias	Deolinda	
11/2016	Outras Histórias	Deolinda	
12/2016	Restart	Aurea	
13/2016	Mind of Mine	Zayn	
14/2016	Sirumba	Linda Martini	
15/2016	Moura	Ana Moura	
16/2016	Capitão Fausto Têm Os Dias Contados	Capitão Fausto	
17/2016	Moura	Ana Moura	
18/2016	Ensemble	Rui Massena	
19/2016	Lemonade	Beyoncé	
20/2016	Panda e os Amigos	Panda e os Amigos	
21/2016	25	Adele	
22/2016	Panda e os Amigos	Panda e os Amigos	
23/2016	Leva-me a Sério	Agir	
24/2016	3	David Carreira	
25/2016	A Moon Shaped Pool	Radiohead	
26/2016	3	David Carreira	
27/2016	3	David Carreira	
28/2016	Leva-me a Sério	Agir	
29/2016	3	David Carreira	
30/2016	Leva-me a Sério	Agir	
31/2016	3	David Carreira	
32/2016	Panda e os Caricas 3	Panda e os Caricas	
33/2016	Panda e os Caricas 3	Panda e os Caricas	
34/2016	Panda e os Caricas 3	Panda e os Caricas	
35/2016	Panda e os Caricas 3	Panda e os Caricas	
36/2016	Panda e os Caricas 3	Panda e os Caricas	
37/2016	Skeleton Tree	Nick Cave and the Bad Seeds	
38/2016	Panda e os Caricas 3	Panda e os Caricas	
39/2016	Illuminate	Shawn Mendes	
40/2016	Panda e os Caricas 3	Panda e os Caricas	
41/2016	Marrow	You Can't Win, Charlie Brown	
42/2016	Se me Amas	Xutos & Pontapés	
43/2016	Até Pensei Que Fosse Minha	António Zambujo	
44/2016	Até Pensei Que Fosse Minha	António Zambujo	
45/2016	Até Pensei Que Fosse Minha	António Zambujo	
46/2016	You Want It Darker	Leonard Cohen	
47/2016	Hardwired... to Self-Destruct	Metallica	
48/2016	Amor é Cego	Anselmo Ralph	
49/2016	Carminho canta Tom Jobim	Carminho	
50/2016	Carminho canta Tom Jobim	Carminho	
51/2016	Carminho canta Tom Jobim	Carminho	
52/2016	Carminho canta Tom Jobim	Carminho	

== See also ==
- List of number-one singles of 2016 (Portugal)
