= List of number-one albums of 2015 (Portugal) =

The Portuguese Albums Chart ranks the best-performing albums in Portugal, as compiled by the Associação Fonográfica Portuguesa.

Number-one albums in Portugal
← 2014 • 2015 • 2016 →

Week	Album	Artist	Reference
1/2015	Sempre	Tony Carreira	
2/2015	Sempre	Tony Carreira	
3/2015	Sempre	Tony Carreira	
4/2015	Sempre	Tony Carreira	
5/2015	Sempre	Tony Carreira	
6/2015	Wallflower	Diana Krall	
7/2015	Wallflower	Diana Krall	
8/2015	Violetta en Concierto	Soundtrack	
9/2015	Uma Questão de Princípio	D.A.M.A.	
10/2015	Extinct	Moonspell	
11/2015	Rebel Heart	Madonna	
12/2015	Serviço Ocasional – Ao vivo no Coliseu do Porto	Os Azeitonas	
13/2015	Espelho	Diogo Piçarra	
14/2015	Uma Questão de Princípio	D.A.M.A.	
15/2015	Uma Questão de Princípio	D.A.M.A.	
16/2015	Uma Questão de Princípio	D.A.M.A.	
17/2015	Uma Questão de Princípio	D.A.M.A.	
18/2015	Uma Questão de Princípio	D.A.M.A.	
19/2015	Infinito Presente	Camané	
20/2015	Roberto Carlos em Las Vegas	Roberto Carlos	
21/2015	Roberto Carlos em Las Vegas	Roberto Carlos	
22/2015	Uma Questão de Princípio	D.A.M.A.	
23/2015	Violetta – En gira	Soundtrack	
24/2015	Drones	Muse	
25/2015	Uma Questão de Princípio	D.A.M.A.	
26/2015	Uma Questão de Princípio	D.A.M.A.	
27/2015	Uma Questão de Princípio	D.A.M.A.	
28/2015	Uma Questão de Princípio	D.A.M.A.	
29/2015	Uma Questão de Princípio	D.A.M.A.	
30/2015	Uma Questão de Princípio	D.A.M.A.	
31/2015	Uma Questão de Princípio	D.A.M.A.	
32/2015	Uma Questão de Princípio	D.A.M.A.	
33/2015	Uma Questão de Princípio	D.A.M.A.	
34/2015	Uma Questão de Princípio	D.A.M.A.	
35/2015	Uma Questão de Princípio	D.A.M.A.	
36/2015	The Book of Souls	Iron Maiden	
37/2015	Uma Questão de Princípio	D.A.M.A.	
38/2015	Rattle That Lock	David Gilmour	
39/2015	Rattle That Lock	David Gilmour	
40/2015	Rattle That Lock	David Gilmour	
41/2015	Mundo	Mariza	
42/2015	Futuro Eu	David Fonseca	
43/2015	Dá-me um Segundo	D.A.M.A.	
44/2015	Dá-me um Segundo	D.A.M.A.	
45/2015	Dá-me um Segundo	D.A.M.A.	
46/2015	Made in the A.M.	One Direction	
47/2015	25	Adele	
48/2015	25	Adele	
49/2015	25	Adele	
50/2015	25	Adele	
51/2015	25	Adele	
52/2015	3	David Carreira	
