= List of number-one albums of 2009 (Portugal) =

The Portuguese Albums Chart ranks the best-performing albums in Portugal, as compiled by the Associação Fonográfica Portuguesa.

Number-one albums in Portugal
← 2008 • 2009 • 2010 →

Week	Album	Artist	Reference
1/2009	O Homem Que Sou	Tony Carreira	
2/2009	O Homem Que Sou	Tony Carreira	
3/2009	O Homem Que Sou	Tony Carreira	
4/2009	O Melhor de Rita Guerra - Acústico ao vivo	Rita Guerra	
5/2009	O Melhor de Rita Guerra - Acústico ao vivo	Rita Guerra	
6/2009	O Melhor de Rita Guerra - Acústico ao vivo	Rita Guerra	
7/2009	O Melhor de Rita Guerra - Acústico ao vivo	Rita Guerra	
8/2009	O Melhor de Rita Guerra - Acústico ao vivo	Rita Guerra	
9/2009	O Melhor de Rita Guerra - Acústico ao vivo	Rita Guerra	
10/2009	O Melhor de Rita Guerra - Acústico ao vivo	Rita Guerra	
11/2009	No Line On The Horizon	U2	
12/2009	No Line On The Horizon	U2	
13/2009	No Line On The Horizon	U2	
14/2009	No Line On The Horizon	U2	
15/2009	Quiet Nights	Diana Krall	
16/2009	Xutos & Pontapés	Xutos & Pontapés	
17/2009	Xutos & Pontapés	Xutos & Pontapés	
18/2009	Xutos & Pontapés	Xutos & Pontapés	
19/2009	Amália Hoje	Hoje	
20/2009	Amália Hoje	Hoje	
21/2009	Amália Hoje	Hoje	
22/2009	Amália Hoje	Hoje	
23/2009	Amália Hoje	Hoje	
24/2009	Amália Hoje	Hoje	
25/2009	Amália Hoje	Hoje	
26/2009	Amália Hoje	Hoje	
27/2009	A mãe	Rodrigo Leão & Cinema Ensemble	
28/2009	A mãe	Rodrigo Leão & Cinema Ensemble	
29/2009	A mãe	Rodrigo Leão & Cinema Ensemble	
30/2009	A mãe	Rodrigo Leão & Cinema Ensemble	
31/2009	Amália Hoje	Hoje	
32/2009	Hannah Montana: The Movie (soundtrack)	Miley Cyrus	
33/2009	Hannah Montana: The Movie (soundtrack)	Miley Cyrus	
34/2009	Amália Hoje	Hoje	
35/2009	Amália Hoje	Hoje	
36/2009	Amália Hoje	Hoje	
37/2009	Amália Hoje	Hoje	
38/2009	Amália Hoje	Hoje	
39/2009	Amália Hoje	Hoje	
40/2009	Backspacer	Pearl Jam	
41/2009	Amália Hoje	Hoje	
42/2009	Amália Hoje	Hoje	
43/2009	Amália Hoje	Hoje	
44/2009	Amália Hoje	Hoje	
45/2009	Amália Hoje	Hoje	
46/2009	Between Waves	David Fonseca	
47/2009	Amália Hoje	Hoje	
48/2009	Amália Hoje	Hoje	
49/2009	Amália Hoje	Hoje	
50/2009	Project	D'ZRT	
51/2009	Três Cantos: Ao Vivo	José Mário Branco, Sérgio Godinho and Fausto	
52/2009	Três Cantos: Ao Vivo	José Mário Branco, Sérgio Godinho and Fausto	
