= List of number-one albums of 2010 (Portugal) =

The Portuguese Albums Chart ranks the best-performing albums in Portugal, as compiled by the Associação Fonográfica Portuguesa.

Number-one albums in Portugal
← 2009 • 2010 • 2011 →

Week	Album	Artist	Reference
01/2010	Project	D'ZRT	
02/2010	Project	D'ZRT	
03/2010	Project	D'ZRT	
04/2010	The E.N.D.	The Black Eyed Peas	
05/2010	The E.N.D.	The Black Eyed Peas	
06/2010	The E.N.D.	The Black Eyed Peas	
07/2010	The E.N.D.	The Black Eyed Peas	
08/2010	Soldier of Love	Sade	
09/2010	Luar	Rita Guerra	
10/2010	Luar	Rita Guerra	
11/2010	Luar	Rita Guerra	
12/2010	Luar	Rita Guerra	
13/2010	Façam o favor de ser felizes!	Raul Solnado	
14/2010	Em Fuga	Tiago Bettencourt & Mantha	
15/2010	Sticky & Sweet Tour	Madonna	
16/2010	Sticky & Sweet Tour	Madonna	
17/2010	Longe	Pedro Abrunhosa & Comité Caviar	
18/2010	Longe	Pedro Abrunhosa & Comité Caviar	
19/2010	Dois Selos e um Carimbo	Deolinda	
20/2010	Dois Selos e um Carimbo	Deolinda	
21/2010	Dois Selos e um Carimbo	Deolinda	
22/2010	Dois Selos e um Carimbo	Deolinda	
23/2010	Amália Hoje - Ao Vivo	Hoje	
24/2010	Ao Vivo no Coliseu de Lisboa	Mickael Carreira	
25/2010	Ao Vivo no Coliseu de Lisboa	Mickael Carreira	
26/2010	Ao Vivo no Coliseu de Lisboa	Mickael Carreira	
27/2010	Can't Be Tamed	Miley Cyrus	
28/2010	Can't Be Tamed	Miley Cyrus	
29/2010	Can't Be Tamed	Miley Cyrus	
30/2010	Can't Be Tamed	Miley Cyrus	
31/2010	Symphonicities	Sting	
32/2010	Symphonicities	Sting	
33/2010	The Suburbs	Arcade Fire	
34/2010	Pai da Criança	Chave d'Ouro	
35/2010	The Final Frontier	Iron Maiden	
36/2010	O Melhor de Beto	Beto	
37/2010	O Melhor de Beto	Beto	
38/2010	O Melhor de Beto	Beto	
39/2010	A Thousand Suns	Linkin Park	
40/2010	O Melhor de Beto	Beto	
41/2010	Do Amor e dos Dias	Camané	
42/2010	Do Amor e dos Dias	Camané	
43/2010	O Coliseu	João Pedro Pais	
44/2010	Sale el Sol	Shakira	
45/2010	Sale el Sol	Shakira	
46/2010	Greatest Hits	Bon Jovi	
47/2010	Greatest Hits	Bon Jovi	
48/2010	Greatest Hits	Bon Jovi	
49/2010	O Mesmo de Sempre	Tony Carreira	
50/2010	O Mesmo de Sempre	Tony Carreira	
51/2010	O Mesmo de Sempre	Tony Carreira	
52/2010	O Mesmo de Sempre	Tony Carreira	
53/2010	O Mesmo de Sempre	Tony Carreira	
