= List of number-one albums of 2026 (Portugal) =

The Portuguese Albums Chart ranks the best-performing albums in Portugal, as compiled by the Associação Fonográfica Portuguesa.

Number-one albums in Portugal
← 2025 • 2026

Number-one albums of 2026 in Portugal
| Week | Album | Artist | Reference |
|---|---|---|---|
| 1 | Lux | Rosalía | |
| 2 | Lux | Rosalía | |
| 3 | Lux | Rosalía | |
| 4 | Lux | Rosalía | |
| 5 | Carta de Alforria | Plutónio | |
| 6 | Octane | Don Toliver | |
| 7 | Debí Tirar Más Fotos | Bad Bunny | |
| 8 | Debí Tirar Más Fotos | Bad Bunny | |
| 9 | Debí Tirar Más Fotos | Bad Bunny | |
| 10 | Debí Tirar Más Fotos | Bad Bunny | |
| 11 | Kiss All the Time. Disco, Occasionally. | Harry Styles | |
| 12 | Kiss All the Time. Disco, Occasionally. | Harry Styles | |
| 13 | Arirang | BTS | |
| 14 | Arirang | BTS | |
| 15 | Arirang | BTS | |
| 16 | Arirang | BTS | |
| 17 | Arirang | BTS | |
| 18 | Arirang | BTS | |
| 19 | Arirang | BTS | |
| 20 | Arirang | BTS | |
| 21 | Iceman | Drake | |
| 22 | Debí Tirar Más Fotos | Bad Bunny | |
| 23 | Debí Tirar Más Fotos | Bad Bunny | |
| 24 | Debí Tirar Más Fotos | Bad Bunny | |
| 25 | You Seem Pretty Sad for a Girl So in Love | Olivia Rodrigo | |
| 26 | You Seem Pretty Sad for a Girl So in Love | Olivia Rodrigo | |
| 27 | You Seem Pretty Sad for a Girl So in Love | Olivia Rodrigo | |
| 28 | Confessions II | Madonna | |
| 29 | You Seem Pretty Sad for a Girl So in Love | Olivia Rodrigo | |
| 30 | Daughter from Hell | Gracie Abrams | |
| 31 | You Seem Pretty Sad for a Girl So in Love | Olivia Rodrigo | |
| 32 | Petal | Ariana Grande | |
| 33 | Petal | Ariana Grande | |
| 34 | You Seem Pretty Sad for a Girl So in Love | Olivia Rodrigo | |
| 35 | You Seem Pretty Sad for a Girl So in Love | Olivia Rodrigo | |
| 36 | You Seem Pretty Sad for a Girl So in Love | Olivia Rodrigo | |
| 37 | You Seem Pretty Sad for a Girl So in Love | Olivia Rodrigo | |
| 38 | Carta de Alforria | Plutónio | |
| 39 | Carta de Alforria | Plutónio | |
| 40 | You Seem Pretty Sad for a Girl So in Love | Olivia Rodrigo | |
| 41 | Carta de Alforria | Plutónio | |
| 42 | Carta de Alforria | Plutónio | |
| 43 | Dopamine Chamber | Fontaines D.C. | |
| 44 | Dopamine Chamber | Fontaines D.C. | |
| 45 | Vendetta: Veni, Vidi, Vici | Plutónio | |
| 46 | Vendetta: Veni, Vidi, Vici | Plutónio | |

== See also ==
- List of number-one singles of 2026 (Portugal)
