= Tout recommencer =

Studio album by David Carreira
- Released: 22 August 2014
- Genre: Pop, rock, dance, hip hop, R&B
- Language: French,
- Label: Warner Music France

David Carreira chronology
A força está em nós (2013)	Tout recommencer (2014)

Tout recommencer (English: Start all over again) is the third studio album of the French-born Portuguese singer David Carreira and the first to mainly target the French language market after two successful albums in Portugal, N.1 (2011) and A força está em nós (2013). It was released on 22 August 2014 and reached number 8 on the official SNEP French Albums Chart, also charting in Belgium's French Wallonia Ultratop Albums Chart.

The album contains some French-language adaptations of hits in his previous albums, like "Boom" and the French/English "Viser le K.O." the latter featuring Snoop Dogg, a remake of the Portuguese/English Carreira hit titled "A força está em nós", the title track from his 2013 album A força está em nós.

== Track listing ==
No.	Title	Length
1.	"Obrigado la famille" (featuring Dry)	3:15
2.	"Boom"	3:46
3.	"Tout recommencer"	3:00
4.	"Rien à envier"	3:12
5.	"Viser le K.O." (featuring Snoop Dogg)	2:55
6.	"Ma liberté"	2:55
7.	"RDV" (featuring Mokobé)	3:24
8.	"Vis ta vie"	3:22
9.	"Je ne marche pas seul"	3:23
10.	"Je suis ce que je suis"	3:43
11.	"Amnésique"	3:23
12.	"Ma liberté" (featuring Tal)	2:57
13.	"Boom" (featuring Leck)	3:43

== Charts ==
Chart (2014)	Peak position
Belgian Albums (Ultratop Wallonia)	27
French Albums (SNEP)	8
