= List of number-one albums of 2006 (Portugal) =

The Portuguese Albums Chart ranks the best-performing albums in Portugal, as compiled by the Associação Fonográfica Portuguesa.

Number-one albums in Portugal
← 2005 • 2006 • 2007 →

Week	Album	Artist	Reference
1/2006	Ao Vivo nos Coliseus	D'ZRT	
2/2006	Ancora	Il Divo	
3/2006	Ancora	Il Divo	
4/2006	Ancora	Il Divo	
5/2006	Ancora	Il Divo	
6/2006	Ancora	Il Divo	
7/2006	Ancora	Il Divo	
8/2006	Ancora	Il Divo	
9/2006	Beautiful Intentions	Melanie C	
10/2006	Beautiful Intentions	Melanie C	
11/2006	Beautiful Intentions	Melanie C	
12/2006	Beautiful Intentions	Melanie C	
13/2006	Beautiful Intentions	Melanie C	
14/2006	Beautiful Intentions	Melanie C	
15/2006	Beautiful Intentions	Melanie C	
16/2006	Beautiful Intentions	Melanie C	
17/2006	Beautiful Intentions	Melanie C	
18/2006	Memorial	Moonspell	
19/2006	Pearl Jam	Pearl Jam	
20/2006	Pearl Jam	Pearl Jam	
21/2006	Eu Estou Aqui	FF	
22/2006	Eu Estou Aqui	FF	
23/2006	Eu Estou Aqui	FF	
24/2006	Eu Estou Aqui	FF	
25/2006	Original	D'ZRT	
26/2006	Floribella	Flor	
27/2006	Floribella	Flor	
28/2006	Floribella	Flor	
29/2006	Floribella	Flor	
30/2006	Floribella	Flor	
31/2006	Floribella	Flor	
32/2006	Floribella	Flor	
33/2006	Floribella	Flor	
34/2006	Floribella	Flor	
35/2006	Floribella	Flor	
36/2006	Floribella	Flor	
37/2006	Floribella	Flor	
38/2006	Floribella	Flor	
39/2006	Floribella	Flor	
40/2006	Acústico	André Sardet	
41/2006	Acústico	André Sardet	
42/2006	Acústico	André Sardet	
43/2006	Acústico	André Sardet	
44/2006	Acústico	André Sardet	
45/2006	Acústico	André Sardet	
46/2006	Acústico	André Sardet	
47/2006	Acústico	André Sardet	
48/2006	Acústico	André Sardet	
49/2006	Acústico	André Sardet	
50/2006	Acústico	André Sardet	
51/2006	4Taste	4Taste	
52/2006	4Taste	4Taste	
