= List of number-one albums of 2005 (Portugal) =

The Portuguese Albums Chart ranks the best-performing albums in Portugal, as compiled by the Associação Fonográfica Portuguesa.

Number-one albums in Portugal
← 2004 • 2005 • 2006 →

Week	Album	Artist	Reference
1/2005	Humanos	Humanos	
2/2005	Best 1991-2004	Seal	
3/2005	Best 1991-2004	Seal	
4/2005	Best 1991-2004	Seal	
5/2005	Best 1991-2004	Seal	
6/2005	Best 1991-2004	Seal	
7/2005	Humanos	Humanos	
8/2005	Humanos	Humanos	
9/2005	Hopes and Fears	Keane	
10/2005	Hopes and Fears	Keane	
11/2005	Hopes and Fears	Keane	
12/2005	Hopes and Fears	Keane	
13/2005	Pra Sempre	Roberto Carlos	
14/2005	Avatara	Blasted Mechanism	
15/2005	Escolinha de Música	Escolinha de Música	
16/2005	Escolinha de Música	Escolinha de Música	
17/2005	Escolinha de Música	Escolinha de Música	
18/2005	Transparente	Mariza	
19/2005	Transparente	Mariza	
20/2005	Transparente	Mariza	
21/2005	D'ZRT	D'ZRT	
22/2005	D'ZRT	D'ZRT	
23/2005	D'ZRT	D'ZRT	
24/2005	D'ZRT	D'ZRT	
25/2005	X&Y	Coldplay	
26/2005	D'ZRT	D'ZRT	
27/2005	D'ZRT	D'ZRT	
28/2005	D'ZRT	D'ZRT	
29/2005	D'ZRT	D'ZRT	
30/2005	D'ZRT	D'ZRT	
31/2005	D'ZRT	D'ZRT	
32/2005	D'ZRT	D'ZRT	
33/2005	D'ZRT	D'ZRT	
34/2005	D'ZRT	D'ZRT	
35/2005	D'ZRT	D'ZRT	
36/2005	D'ZRT	D'ZRT	
37/2005	D'ZRT	D'ZRT	
38/2005	D'ZRT	D'ZRT	
39/2005	D'ZRT	D'ZRT	
40/2005	D'ZRT	D'ZRT	
41/2005	D'ZRT	D'ZRT	
42/2005	D'ZRT	D'ZRT	
43/2005	Playing The Angel	Depeche Mode	
44/2005	Our Hearts Will Beat As One	David Fonseca	
45/2005	Intensive Care	Robbie Williams	
46/2005	Intensive Care	Robbie Williams	
47/2005	Confessions on a Dance Floor	Madonna	
48/2005	Confessions on a Dance Floor	Madonna	
49/2005	Confessions on a Dance Floor	Madonna	
50/2005	A Espuma das Canções	Rui Veloso	
51/2005	Ancora	Il Divo	
52/2005	Ao Vivo nos Coliseus	D'ZRT	
