= List of number-one albums of 1990 (Portugal) =

The Portuguese Albums Chart ranks the best-performing albums in Portugal, as compiled by the Associação Fonográfica Portuguesa.

Number-one albums in Portugal
1990 • 1991 →

Week	Album	Artist	Reference
1/1990			
2/1990	...But Seriously	Phil Collins	
3/1990	...But Seriously	Phil Collins	
4/1990	...But Seriously	Phil Collins	
5/1990	...But Seriously	Phil Collins	
6/1990	...But Seriously	Phil Collins	
7/1990	...But Seriously	Phil Collins	
8/1990	...But Seriously	Phil Collins	
9/1990	...But Seriously	Phil Collins	
10/1990	...But Seriously	Phil Collins	
11/1990	...But Seriously	Phil Collins	
12/1990	Amazónia	Roberto Carlos	
13/1990	Amazónia	Roberto Carlos	
14/1990	...But Seriously	Phil Collins	
15/1990	...But Seriously	Phil Collins	
16/1990	...But Seriously	Phil Collins	
17/1990	...But Seriously	Phil Collins	
18/1990	...But Seriously	Phil Collins	
19/1990	The Legend of Eagles	Eagles	
20/1990	Pump Up The Jam	Technotronic	
21/1990	Mosaïque	Gipsy Kings	
22/1990	Mosaïque	Gipsy Kings	
23/1990	...But Seriously	Phil Collins	
24/1990	Mosaïque	Gipsy Kings	
25/1990	The Very Best of Cat Stevens	Cat Stevens	
26/1990	The Very Best of Cat Stevens	Cat Stevens	
27/1990	The Very Best of Cat Stevens	Cat Stevens	
28/1990	The Very Best of Cat Stevens	Cat Stevens	
29/1990	Existir	Madredeus	
30/1990	The Very Best of Cat Stevens	Cat Stevens	
31/1990	Existir	Madredeus	
32/1990	I'm Breathless	Madonna	
33/1990	Existir	Madredeus	
34/1990	Existir	Madredeus	
35/1990	Mingos & Os Samurais	Rui Veloso	
36/1990	Mingos & Os Samurais	Rui Veloso	
37/1990	Mingos & Os Samurais	Rui Veloso	
38/1990	Mingos & Os Samurais	Rui Veloso	
39/1990	Mingos & Os Samurais	Rui Veloso	
40/1990	Mingos & Os Samurais	Rui Veloso	
41/1990	Mingos & Os Samurais	Rui Veloso	
42/1990	Mingos & Os Samurais	Rui Veloso	
43/1990	Mingos & Os Samurais	Rui Veloso	
44/1990	Mingos & Os Samurais	Rui Veloso	
45/1990	Mingos & Os Samurais	Rui Veloso	
46/1990	Mingos & Os Samurais	Rui Veloso	
47/1990	Mingos & Os Samurais	Rui Veloso	
48/1990	Mingos & Os Samurais	Rui Veloso	
49/1990	Mingos & Os Samurais	Rui Veloso	
50/1990	Mingos & Os Samurais	Rui Veloso	
51/1990	The Very Best of Elton John	Elton John	
52/1990			

== See also ==
- List of number-one singles of 1990 (Portugal)
