= List of number-one singles of 2024 (Portugal) =

The Portuguese Singles Chart ranks the best-performing singles in Portugal, as compiled by the Associação Fonográfica Portuguesa.

Number-one singles of 2024 in Portugal
Week	Song	Artist	Reference
1	"Tata"	Slow J	
2	"Tata"	Slow J	
3	"Tata"	Slow J	
4	"Tata"	Slow J	
5	"Tata"	Slow J	
6	"Tata"	Slow J	
7	"Pocpoc"	Pedro Sampaio	
8	"Alô"	Dillaz featuring Plutónio	
9	"Alô"	Dillaz featuring Plutónio	
10	"Habibi"	Dillaz	
11	"Habibi"	Dillaz	
12	"Habibi"	Dillaz	
13	"Alô"	Dillaz featuring Plutónio	
14	"Beautiful Things"	Benson Boone	
15	"Bênção"	Mizzy Miles, Bispo and Van Zee	
16	"Bênção"	Mizzy Miles, Bispo and Van Zee	
17	"Bênção"	Mizzy Miles, Bispo and Van Zee	
18	"Bênção"	Mizzy Miles, Bispo and Van Zee	
19	"Bênção"	Mizzy Miles, Bispo and Van Zee	
20	"Bênção"	Mizzy Miles, Bispo and Van Zee	
21	"Lunch"	Billie Eilish	
22	"MTG Quem Não Quer Sou Eu"	Seu Jorge, MC Leozin and DJ Topo	
23	"MTG Quem Não Quer Sou Eu"	Seu Jorge, MC Leozin and DJ Topo	
24	"MTG Quem Não Quer Sou Eu"	Seu Jorge, MC Leozin and DJ Topo	
25	"Sagrado Profano"	Luísa Sonza and Kayblack	
26	"Sagrado Profano"	Luísa Sonza and Kayblack	
27	"Sagrado Profano"	Luísa Sonza and Kayblack	
28	"Sagrado Profano"	Luísa Sonza and Kayblack	
29	"Sagrado Profano"	Luísa Sonza and Kayblack	
30	"Alibi"	Sevdaliza, Pabllo Vittar and Yseult	
31	"Alibi"	Sevdaliza, Pabllo Vittar and Yseult	
32	"Move"	Adam Port and Stryv featuring Malachiii	
33	"Move"	Adam Port and Stryv featuring Malachiii	
34	"Move"	Adam Port and Stryv featuring Malachiii	
35	"Si Antes Te Hubiera Conocido"	Karol G	
36	"Si Antes Te Hubiera Conocido"	Karol G	
37	"The Emptiness Machine"	Linkin Park	
38	"Die with a Smile"	Lady Gaga and Bruno Mars	
39	"Die with a Smile"	Lady Gaga and Bruno Mars	
40	"Die with a Smile"	Lady Gaga and Bruno Mars	
41	"Die with a Smile"	Lady Gaga and Bruno Mars	
42	"Die with a Smile"	Lady Gaga and Bruno Mars	
43	"Die with a Smile"	Lady Gaga and Bruno Mars	
44	"Die with a Smile"	Lady Gaga and Bruno Mars	
45	"São Paulo"	The Weeknd and Anitta	
46	"Interestelar"	Plutónio	
47	"Interestelar"	Plutónio	
48	"Interestelar"	Plutónio	
49	"Interestelar"	Plutónio	
50	"Interestelar"	Plutónio	
51	"Interestelar"	Plutónio	
52	"All I Want for Christmas Is You"	Mariah Carey	

== See also ==
- List of number-one albums of 2024 (Portugal)
