= List of number-one singles of 1990 (Portugal) =

The Portuguese Singles Chart ranks the best-performing singles in Portugal, as compiled by the Associação Fonográfica Portuguesa.

Number-one singles in Portugal
← 1989 • 1990 • 1991 →

Week	Song	Artist	Reference
1/1990			
2/1990	"Lambada"	Kaoma	
3/1990	"Lambada"	Kaoma	
4/1990	"Lambada"	Kaoma	
5/1990	"Lambada"	Kaoma	
6/1990	"Lambada"	Kaoma	
7/1990	"Lambada"	Kaoma	
8/1990	"Lambada"	Kaoma	
9/1990	"Lambada"	Kaoma	
10/1990	"Another Day in Paradise"	Phil Collins	
11/1990	"Lambada"	Kaoma	
12/1990	"Another Day in Paradise"	Phil Collins	
13/1990	"Another Day in Paradise"	Phil Collins	
14/1990	"Pump Up the Jam"	Technotronic	
15/1990	"Pump Up the Jam"	Technotronic	
16/1990	"Pump Up the Jam"	Technotronic	
17/1990	"Pump Up the Jam"	Technotronic	
18/1990	"Pump Up the Jam"	Technotronic	
19/1990	"Pump Up the Jam"	Technotronic	
20/1990	"Pump Up the Jam"	Technotronic	
21/1990	"Pump Up the Jam"	Technotronic	
22/1990	"Pump Up the Jam"	Technotronic	
23/1990	"Pump Up the Jam"	Technotronic	
24/1990	"Pump Up the Jam"	Technotronic	
25/1990	"Pump Up the Jam"	Technotronic	
26/1990	"Pirilampo Mágico"	Various artists	
27/1990	"Pump Up the Jam"	Technotronic	
28/1990	"Baby Can I Hold You"	Tracy Chapman	
29/1990	"Pump Up the Jam"	Technotronic	
30/1990	"Baby Can I Hold You"	Tracy Chapman	
31/1990	"Pump Up the Jam"	Technotronic	
32/1990	"Nothing Compares 2 U"	Sinéad O'Connor	
33/1990	"Nothing Compares 2 U"	Sinéad O'Connor	
34/1990	"Pump Up the Jam"	Technotronic	
35/1990	"Nothing Compares 2 U"	Sinéad O'Connor	
36/1990	"Nothing Compares 2 U"	Sinéad O'Connor	
37/1990	"Não Há Estrelas no Céu"	Rui Veloso	
38/1990	"Não Há Estrelas no Céu"	Rui Veloso	
39/1990	"Não Há Estrelas no Céu"	Rui Veloso	
40/1990	"Não Há Estrelas no Céu"	Rui Veloso	
41/1990	"Não Há Estrelas no Céu"	Rui Veloso	
42/1990	"Não Há Estrelas no Céu"	Rui Veloso	
43/1990	"Não Há Estrelas no Céu"	Rui Veloso	
44/1990	"Não Há Estrelas no Céu"	Rui Veloso	
45/1990	"Não Há Estrelas no Céu"	Rui Veloso	
46/1990	"Não Há Estrelas no Céu"	Rui Veloso	
47/1990	"Não Há Estrelas no Céu"	Rui Veloso	
48/1990	"Não Há Estrelas no Céu"	Rui Veloso	
49/1990	"Não Há Estrelas no Céu"	Rui Veloso	
50/1990	"Não Há Estrelas no Céu"	Rui Veloso	
51/1990	"Não Há Estrelas no Céu"	Rui Veloso	
52/1990			

== See also ==
- List of number-one albums of 1990 (Portugal)
