= List of number-one albums of 1992 (Portugal) =

The Portuguese Albums Chart ranks the best-performing albums in Portugal, as compiled by the Associação Fonográfica Portuguesa.

Number-one albums in Portugal
← 1991 • 1992 • 1993 →

Week	Album	Artist	Reference
1/1992			
2/1992	Greatest Hits II	Queen	
3/1992	Waking Up The Neighbours	Bryan Adams	
4/1992	Greatest Hits II	Queen	
5/1992	Waking Up The Neighbours	Bryan Adams	
6/1992	Greatest Hits II	Queen	
7/1992	Greatest Hits II	Queen	
8/1992	Greatest Hits II	Queen	
9/1992	Palavras Ao Vento	Resistência	
10/1992	Palavras Ao Vento	Resistência	
11/1992	Greatest Hits II	Queen	
12/1992	Palavras Ao Vento	Resistência	
13/1992	Palavras Ao Vento	Resistência	
14/1992	Palavras Ao Vento	Resistência	
15/1992	Palavras Ao Vento	Resistência	
16/1992	Palavras Ao Vento	Resistência	
17/1992	Palavras Ao Vento	Resistência	
18/1992	Palavras Ao Vento	Resistência	
19/1992	Palavras Ao Vento	Resistência	
20/1992	Palavras Ao Vento	Resistência	
21/1992	Palavras Ao Vento	Resistência	
22/1992	Still Loving You	Scorpions	
23/1992	Palavras Ao Vento	Resistência	
24/1992	Palavras Ao Vento	Resistência	
25/1992	Palavras Ao Vento	Resistência	
26/1992	Still Loving You	Scorpions	
27/1992	Rock in Rio Douro	GNR	
28/1992	Live at Wembley '86	Queen	
29/1992	Live at Wembley '86	Queen	
30/1992	Live at Wembley '86	Queen	
31/1992	Rock in Rio Douro	GNR	
32/1992	Use Your Illusion II	Guns N' Roses	
33/1992	Rock in Rio Douro	GNR	
34/1992	Rock in Rio Douro	GNR	
35/1992	Rock in Rio Douro	GNR	
36/1992	Rock in Rio Douro	GNR	
37/1992	Rock in Rio Douro	GNR	
38/1992	Rock in Rio Douro	GNR	
39/1992	Rock in Rio Douro	GNR	
40/1992	Nevermind	Nirvana	
41/1992	Earthrise - The Rainforest Album	Various	
42/1992	Rock in Rio Douro	GNR	
43/1992	Earthrise - The Rainforest Album	Various	
44/1992	Earthrise - The Rainforest Album	Various	
45/1992	Earthrise - The Rainforest Album	Various	
46/1992	ABBA Gold: Greatest Hits	ABBA	
47/1992	ABBA Gold: Greatest Hits	ABBA	
48/1992	ABBA Gold: Greatest Hits	ABBA	
49/1992	ABBA Gold: Greatest Hits	ABBA	
50/1992	ABBA Gold: Greatest Hits	ABBA	
51/1992	ABBA Gold: Greatest Hits	ABBA	
52/1992			

== See also ==
- List of number-one singles of 1992 (Portugal)
