= Angélico Vieira =

Portuguese actor and singer

- Born: 1 January 1983; Lisbon, Portugal
- Died: 28 June 2011 (aged 28); Porto, Portugal
- Education: Escola Superior de Hotelaria e Turismo do Estoril
- Occupations: Singer; songwriter; actor; model; director; record producer; dancer
- Years active: 2004–2011
- Musical career
- Genres: Pop; R&B; Kizomba; Zouk; Electronic; Latin Pop
- Instrument: Vocals
- Labels: Farol Música; Warner Music Group
- Formerly of: D'ZRT
- Website: Angelico-Vieira.com; AngelicoVieira.net

Angélico Vieira (1 January 1983 – 28 June 2011), whose full name was Sandro Milton Vieira Angélico, was a Portuguese actor and singer. He was a member of the Portuguese boy band D'ZRT.

Angélico was born in the 5th minute of 1 January 1983, in the Maternidade Alfredo da Costa. Since the maternity supported the first baby of the year with benefits, the mother of Angélico registered him as if he was born on 31 December 1982, for a girl who was born soon after to drug addicts to receive support from the hospital.

Vieira began his career when he was cast as the character, David, in the Portuguese soap opera, Morangos com Açúcar. Simultaneously, he joined the boy band D'ZRT, which achieved national attention. Vieira appeared in several other television roles, including soap operas, during his career.

In the early morning hours of 25 June 2011, Vieira was driving from northern Portugal to Lisbon for the release of his new solo album. Vieira was driving his friend’s BMW 6-series over 150 miles per hour in the southbound lanes of the A1 motorway near the Estarreja exit when his left, front tyre burst at approximately 3:15 am, causing a one-car crash. Vieira, who suffered severe head and brain injuries in the accident, was taken to Santo António Hospital in Porto, Portugal where he underwent surgery. He died from his injuries on 28 June 2011 at the age of 28.

== Discography ==
=== Albums ===
- 2008 – Angélico
- 2011 – Eu Acredito

== Filmography ==
=== Films ===
- 20,13 Purgatório

=== Soap operas and television ===
- Morangos com Açúcar – David
- Dance Dance Dance – Bruno Medeiros
- Doce Fugitiva – Angélico Vieira
- Feitiço de Amor – Leonardo
- Secret Story 1 (Portugal) (Genérico)
- Espírito Indomável – Simão Teixeira
