= List of number-one albums of 1991 (Portugal) =

The Portuguese Albums Chart ranks the best-performing albums in Portugal, as compiled by the Associação Fonográfica Portuguesa.

Number-one albums in Portugal
← 1990 • 1991 • 1992 →

Week	Album	Artist	Reference
1/1991			
2/1991	Mingos & Os Samurais	Rui Veloso	
3/1991	Mingos & Os Samurais	Rui Veloso	
4/1991	Mingos & Os Samurais	Rui Veloso	
5/1991	Mingos & Os Samurais	Rui Veloso	
6/1991	Carreras Domingo Pavarotti in Concert	José Carreras, Plácido Domingo and Luciano Pavarotti	
7/1991	Mingos & Os Samurais	Rui Veloso	
8/1991	Mingos & Os Samurais	Rui Veloso	
9/1991	Mingos & Os Samurais	Rui Veloso	
10/1991	Innuendo	Queen	
11/1991	Innuendo	Queen	
12/1991	MCMXC a.D.	Enigma	
13/1991	MCMXC a.D.	Enigma	
14/1991	Innuendo	Queen	
15/1991	MCMXC a.D.	Enigma	
16/1991	MCMXC a.D.	Enigma	
17/1991	MCMXC a.D.	Enigma	
18/1991	MCMXC a.D.	Enigma	
19/1991	The Very Best of Supertramp	Supertramp	
20/1991	MCMXC a.D.	Enigma	
21/1991	MCMXC a.D.	Enigma	
22/1991	MCMXC a.D.	Enigma	
23/1991	MCMXC a.D.	Enigma	
24/1991	Out of Time	R.E.M.	
25/1991	MCMXC a.D.	Enigma	
26/1991	MCMXC a.D.	Enigma	
27/1991	MCMXC a.D.	Enigma	
28/1991	Collection	The Beach Boys	
29/1991	Collection	The Beach Boys	
30/1991	Collection	The Beach Boys	
31/1991	Collection	The Beach Boys	
32/1991	Collection	The Beach Boys	
33/1991	Este Mundo	Gipsy Kings	
34/1991	Out of Time	R.E.M.	
35/1991	Out of Time	R.E.M.	
36/1991	Out of Time	R.E.M.	
37/1991	Bachata Rosa	Juan Luis Guerra	
38/1991	Out of Time	R.E.M.	
39/1991	Bachata Rosa	Juan Luis Guerra	
40/1991	Bachata Rosa	Juan Luis Guerra	
41/1991	On Every Street	Dire Straits	
42/1991	Bachata Rosa	Juan Luis Guerra	
43/1991	Waking Up The Neighbours	Bryan Adams	
44/1991	Waking Up The Neighbours	Bryan Adams	
45/1991	Simply The Best	Tina Turner	
46/1991	Waking Up The Neighbours	Bryan Adams	
47/1991	Waking Up The Neighbours	Bryan Adams	
48/1991	Waking Up The Neighbours	Bryan Adams	
49/1991	Waking Up The Neighbours	Bryan Adams	
50/1991	Waking Up The Neighbours	Bryan Adams	
51/1991			

== See also ==
- List of number-one singles of 1991 (Portugal)
