= List of number-one singles of 2025 (Portugal) =

The Portuguese Singles Chart ranks the best-performing singles in Portugal, as compiled by the Associação Fonográfica Portuguesa.

Number-one singles of 2025 in Portugal
| Week | Song | Artist | Reference |
|---|---|---|---|
| 1 | "Oh Garota Eu Quero Você Só Pra Mim" | Oruam, Zé Felipe and MC Tuto featuring DJ LC da Roça, MC K9, MC Rodrigo do CN and MC PL Alves | |
| 2 | "Oh Garota Eu Quero Você Só Pra Mim" | Oruam, Zé Felipe and MC Tuto featuring DJ LC da Roça, MC K9, MC Rodrigo do CN and MC PL Alves | |
| 3 | "DTMF" | Bad Bunny | |
| 4 | "DTMF" | Bad Bunny | |
| 5 | "DTMF" | Bad Bunny | |
| 6 | "Oh Garota Eu Quero Você Só Pra Mim" | Oruam, Zé Felipe and MC Tuto featuring DJ LC da Roça, MC K9, MC Rodrigo do CN and MC PL Alves | |
| 7 | "Oh Garota Eu Quero Você Só Pra Mim" | Oruam, Zé Felipe and MC Tuto featuring DJ LC da Roça, MC K9, MC Rodrigo do CN and MC PL Alves | |
| 8 | "Oh Garota Eu Quero Você Só Pra Mim" | Oruam, Zé Felipe and MC Tuto featuring DJ LC da Roça, MC K9, MC Rodrigo do CN and MC PL Alves | |
| 9 | "Oh Garota Eu Quero Você Só Pra Mim" | Oruam, Zé Felipe and MC Tuto featuring DJ LC da Roça, MC K9, MC Rodrigo do CN and MC PL Alves | |
| 10 | "Oh Garota Eu Quero Você Só Pra Mim" | Oruam, Zé Felipe and MC Tuto featuring DJ LC da Roça, MC K9, MC Rodrigo do CN and MC PL Alves | |
| 11 | "Deslocado" | Napa | |
| 12 | "Mãe Solteira" | DG e Batidão Stronda, MC Davi, J. Eskine and MC G15 | |
| 13 | "Mãe Solteira" | DG e Batidão Stronda, MC Davi, J. Eskine and MC G15 | |
| 14 | "Mãe Solteira" | DG e Batidão Stronda, MC Davi, J. Eskine and MC G15 | |
| 15 | "Mãe Solteira" | DG e Batidão Stronda, MC Davi, J. Eskine and MC G15 | |
| 16 | "Mussulo" | DJ Malvado and DJ Aka-m featuring Dody | |
| 17 | "Mussulo" | DJ Malvado and DJ Aka-m featuring Dody | |
| 18 | "Mussulo" | DJ Malvado and DJ Aka-m featuring Dody | |
| 19 | "Ordinary" | Alex Warren | |
| 20 | "Ordinary" | Alex Warren | |
| 21 | "Deslocado" | Napa | |
| 22 | "Ordinary" | Alex Warren | |
| 23 | "Ordinary" | Alex Warren | |
| 24 | "Mussulo" | DJ Malvado and DJ Aka-m featuring Dody | |
| 25 | "Mussulo" | DJ Malvado and DJ Aka-m featuring Dody | |
| 26 | "Pôr do Sol" | Vizinhos | |
| 27 | "Pôr do Sol" | Vizinhos | |
| 28 | "Pôr do Sol" | Vizinhos | |
| 29 | "Pôr do Sol" | Vizinhos | |
| 30 | "Pôr do Sol" | Vizinhos | |
| 31 | "Pôr do Sol" | Vizinhos | |
| 32 | "Pôr do Sol" | Vizinhos | |
| 33 | "Pôr do Sol" | Vizinhos | |
| 34 | "Pôr do Sol" | Vizinhos | |
| 35 | "Pôr do Sol" | Vizinhos | |
| 36 | "Pôr do Sol" | Vizinhos | |
| 37 | "Pôr do Sol" | Vizinhos | |
| 38 | "Pôr do Sol" | Vizinhos | |
| 39 | "Pôr do Sol" | Vizinhos | |
| 40 | "Pôr do Sol" | Vizinhos | |
| 41 | "The Fate of Ophelia" | Taylor Swift | |
| 42 | "The Fate of Ophelia" | Taylor Swift | |
| 43 | "Sequência Feiticeira" | Pedro Sampaio, MC GW, MC Jhey and MC Rodrigo do CN | |
| 44 | "Posso Até Não Te Dar Flores" | DJ Japa NK, MC Meno K, MC Ryan SP and MC Jacaré | |
| 45 | "Posso Até Não Te Dar Flores" | DJ Japa NK, MC Meno K, MC Ryan SP and MC Jacaré | |
| 46 | "Posso Até Não Te Dar Flores" | DJ Japa NK, MC Meno K, MC Ryan SP and MC Jacaré | |
| 47 | "Posso Até Não Te Dar Flores" | DJ Japa NK, MC Meno K, MC Ryan SP and MC Jacaré | |
| 48 | "Posso Até Não Te Dar Flores" | DJ Japa NK, MC Meno K, MC Ryan SP and MC Jacaré | |
| 49 | "Posso Até Não Te Dar Flores" | DJ Japa NK, MC Meno K, MC Ryan SP and MC Jacaré | |
| 50 | "Posso Até Não Te Dar Flores" | DJ Japa NK, MC Meno K, MC Ryan SP and MC Jacaré | |
| 51 | "Posso Até Não Te Dar Flores" | DJ Japa NK, MC Meno K, MC Ryan SP and MC Jacaré | |
| 52 | "All I Want for Christmas Is You" | Mariah Carey | |

== See also ==
- List of number-one albums of 2025 (Portugal)
