= List of number-one singles of 1994 (Portugal) =

The Portuguese Albums Chart ranks the best-performing albums in Portugal, as compiled by the Associação Fonográfica Portuguesa. The chart was suspended by AFP in week 3 and would only return in 2000.

Number-one singles in Portugal
← 1993 • 1994

Week	Song	Artist	Reference
1/1994	"Perco a Cabeça"	Marco Paulo	
2/1994	"Perco a Cabeça"	Marco Paulo	

== See also ==
- List of number-one albums of 1994 (Portugal)
