= List of number-one albums of 1994 (Portugal) =

The Portuguese Albums Chart ranks the best-performing albums in Portugal, as compiled by the Associação Fonográfica Portuguesa.

Number-one albums in Portugal
← 1993 • 1994 • 1995 →

Week	Album	Artist	Reference
1/1994	So Far So Good	Bryan Adams	
2/1994	So Far So Good	Bryan Adams	
3/1994	Nº1	Various	
4/1994	Nº1	Various	
5/1994	Nº1	Various	
6/1994	Nº1	Various	
7/1994	Nº1	Various	
8/1994	Nº1	Various	
9/1994	The One Thing	Michael Bolton	
10/1994	The One Thing	Michael Bolton	
11/1994	Electricidade	Various	
12/1994	Electricidade	Various	
13/1994	Electricidade	Various	
14/1994	Electricidade	Various	
15/1994	Electricidade	Various	
16/1994	Electricidade	Various	
17/1994	The Division Bell	Pink Floyd	
18/1994	The Division Bell	Pink Floyd	
19/1994	The Division Bell	Pink Floyd	
20/1994	The Division Bell	Pink Floyd	
21/1994	Happy Nation	Ace of Base	
22/1994	Happy Nation	Ace of Base	
23/1994	Happy Nation	Ace of Base	
24/1994	Happy Nation	Ace of Base	
25/1994	Dance Mania '94	Various	
26/1994	Music Box	Mariah Carey	
27/1994	Dance Mania '94	Various	
28/1994	Music Box	Mariah Carey	
29/1994	Music Box	Mariah Carey	
30/1994	O Espírito da Paz	Madredeus	
31/1994	O Espírito da Paz	Madredeus	
32/1994	O Espírito da Paz	Madredeus	
33/1994	Dance Power	Various	
34/1994	Dance Power	Various	
35/1994	Dance Power	Various	
36/1994	Dance Power	Various	
37/1994	Viagens	Pedro Abrunhosa	
38/1994	Viagens	Pedro Abrunhosa	
39/1994	Dance Power	Various	
40/1994	Viagens	Pedro Abrunhosa	
41/1994	Viagens	Pedro Abrunhosa	
42/1994	16 Top World Charts '94	Various	
43/1994	16 Top World Charts '94	Various	
44/1994	16 Top World Charts '94	Various	
45/1994	Cross Road	Bon Jovi	
46/1994	Cross Road	Bon Jovi	
47/1994	Cross Road	Bon Jovi	
48/1994	MTV Unplugged in New York	Nirvana	
49/1994	MTV Unplugged in New York	Nirvana	
50/1994	Cross Road	Bon Jovi	
51/1994	Cross Road	Bon Jovi	
52/1994	Supermix 9	Various	

== See also ==
- List of number-one singles of 1994 (Portugal)
