= List of number-one albums of 2000 (Portugal) =

The Portuguese Albums Chart ranks the best-performing albums in Portugal, as compiled by the Associação Fonográfica Portuguesa.

Number-one albums in Portugal
← 1999 • 2000 • 2001 →

Week	Album	Artist	Reference
1/2000	MTV Unplugged	Alanis Morissette	
2/2000	MTV Unplugged	Alanis Morissette	
3/2000	MTV Unplugged	Alanis Morissette	
4/2000	MTV Unplugged	Alanis Morissette	
5/2000	MTV Unplugged	Alanis Morissette	
6/2000	MTV Unplugged	Alanis Morissette	
7/2000	MTV Unplugged	Alanis Morissette	
8/2000	Enrique	Enrique Iglesias	
9/2000	Enrique	Enrique Iglesias	
10/2000	Supernatural	Santana	
11/2000	Supernatural	Santana	
12/2000	Supernatural	Santana	
13/2000	Supernatural	Santana	
14/2000	Supernatural	Santana	
15/2000	Is There Anybody Out There? The Wall Live 1980–81	Pink Floyd	
16/2000	Is There Anybody Out There? The Wall Live 1980–81	Pink Floyd	
17/2000	Is There Anybody Out There? The Wall Live 1980–81	Pink Floyd	
18/2000	The Platinum Album	Vengaboys	
19/2000	Supernatural	Santana	
20/2000	Don't Give Me Names	Guano Apes	
21/2000	Don't Give Me Names	Guano Apes	
22/2000	Binaural	Pearl Jam	
23/2000	Binaural	Pearl Jam	
24/2000	Oops!... I Did It Again	Britney Spears	
25/2000	Oops!... I Did It Again	Britney Spears	
26/2000	Brand New Day	Sting	
27/2000	Oops!... I Did It Again	Britney Spears	
28/2000	Only Pain is Real	Silence 4	
29/2000	Only Pain is Real	Silence 4	
30/2000	Only Pain is Real	Silence 4	
31/2000	Only Pain is Real	Silence 4	
32/2000	Only Pain is Real	Silence 4	
33/2000	Only Pain is Real	Silence 4	
34/2000	Only Pain is Real	Silence 4	
35/2000	Only Pain is Real	Silence 4	
36/2000	Only Pain is Real	Silence 4	
37/2000	Only Pain is Real	Silence 4	
38/2000	Moment of Glory	Scorpions and Berliner Philarmoniker	
39/2000	In Blue	The Corrs	
40/2000	Moment of Glory	Scorpions and Berliner Philarmoniker	
41/2000	23-5-00, Estádio do Restelo, Lisbon Portugal	Pearl Jam	
42/2000	23-5-00, Estádio do Restelo, Lisbon Portugal	Pearl Jam	
43/2000	23-5-00, Estádio do Restelo, Lisbon Portugal	Pearl Jam	
44/2000	Chocolate Starfish and the Hot Dog Flavored Water	Limp Bizkit	
45/2000	Chocolate Starfish and the Hot Dog Flavored Water	Limp Bizkit	
46/2000	All That You Can't Leave Behind	U2	
47/2000	All That You Can't Leave Behind	U2	
48/2000	1	The Beatles	
49/2000	1	The Beatles	
50/2000	1	The Beatles	
51/2000	1	The Beatles	
52/2000	1	The Beatles	
