= List of number-one albums of 2003 (Portugal) =

The Portuguese Albums Chart ranks the best-performing albums in Portugal, as compiled by the Associação Fonográfica Portuguesa.

Number-one albums in Portugal
← 2002 • 2003 • 2004 →

Week	Album	Artist	Reference
1/2003			
2/2003	Momento	Pedro Abrunhosa	
3/2003	Hijas del Tomate	Las Ketchup	
4/2003	Hijas del Tomate	Las Ketchup	
5/2003	Momento	Pedro Abrunhosa	
6/2003	Escapology	Robbie Williams	
7/2003	Escapology	Robbie Williams	
8/2003	Escapology	Robbie Williams	
9/2003	Escapology	Robbie Williams	
10/2003	Escapology	Robbie Williams	
11/2003	Adiafa	Adiafa	
12/2003	Adiafa	Adiafa	
13/2003	Adiafa	Adiafa	
14/2003	Meteora	Linkin Park	
15/2003	Meteora	Linkin Park	
16/2003	Adiafa	Adiafa	
17/2003	O Irmão do Meio	Sérgio Godinho	
18/2003	O Irmão do Meio	Sérgio Godinho	
19/2003	O Irmão do Meio	Sérgio Godinho	
20/2003	Porto Campeão	Super Dragões	
21/2003	Porto Campeão	Super Dragões	
22/2003	Porto Campeão	Super Dragões	
23/2003	St. Anger	Metallica	
24/2003	St. Anger	Metallica	
25/2003	St. Anger	Metallica	
26/2003	St. Anger	Metallica	
27/2003	Tribalistas	Tribalistas	
28/2003	Tribalistas	Tribalistas	
29/2003	Tribalistas	Tribalistas	
30/2003	Tribalistas	Tribalistas	
31/2003	Tribalistas	Tribalistas	
32/2003	Tribalistas	Tribalistas	
33/2003	Tribalistas	Tribalistas	
34/2003	Tribalistas	Tribalistas	
35/2003	Tribalistas	Tribalistas	
36/2003	Tribalistas	Tribalistas	
37/2003	Tribalistas	Tribalistas	
38/2003	Tribalistas	Tribalistas	
39/2003	Tribalistas	Tribalistas	
40/2003	Tribalistas	Tribalistas	
41/2003	Tribalistas	Tribalistas	
42/2003	Live Summer 2003	Robbie Williams	
43/2003	Live Summer 2003	Robbie Williams	
44/2003	Live Summer 2003	Robbie Williams	
45/2003	Live Summer 2003	Robbie Williams	
46/2003	Live Summer 2003	Robbie Williams	
47/2003	O Concerto Acústico	Rui Veloso	
48/2003	O Concerto Acústico	Rui Veloso	
49/2003	O Concerto Acústico	Rui Veloso	
50/2003	O Concerto Acústico	Rui Veloso	
51/2003	O Concerto Acústico	Rui Veloso	
52/2003	O Concerto Acústico	Rui Veloso	
