= List of number-one singles of 1991 (Portugal) =

The Portuguese Singles Chart ranks the best-performing singles in Portugal, as compiled by the Associação Fonográfica Portuguesa.

Number-one singles in Portugal
← 1990 • 1991 • 1992 →

| Week | Song | Artist | Reference |
|---|---|---|---|
| 1/1991 | | | |
| 2/1991 | "We Love to Love" | P.M. Sampson & Double Key | |
| 3/1991 | "Não Há Estrelas no Céu" | Rui Veloso | |
| 4/1991 | "Não Há Estrelas no Céu" | Rui Veloso | |
| 5/1991 | "Não Há Estrelas no Céu" | Rui Veloso | |
| 6/1991 | "I'm Your Baby Tonight" | Whitney Houston | |
| 7/1991 | "A Paixão" | Rui Veloso | |
| 8/1991 | "Não Há Estrelas no Céu" | Rui Veloso | |
| 9/1991 | "Não Há Estrelas no Céu" | Rui Veloso | |
| 10/1991 | "Não Há Estrelas no Céu" | Rui Veloso | |
| 11/1991 | "A Paixão" | Rui Veloso | |
| 12/1991 | "Blue Velvet" | Bobby Vinton | |
| 13/1991 | "Innuendo" | Queen | |
| 14/1991 | "What Is Sadness?" | Device | |
| 15/1991 | "Sadeness (Part I)" | Enigma | |
| 16/1991 | "Blue Velvet" | Bobby Vinton | |
| 17/1991 | "Innuendo" | Queen | |
| 18/1991 | "Sadeness (Part I)" | Enigma | |
| 19/1991 | "Blue Velvet" | Bobby Vinton | |
| 20/1991 | "Innuendo" | Queen | |
| 21/1991 | "I Can See Clearly Now" | Johnny Nash | |
| 22/1991 | "I Can See Clearly Now" | Johnny Nash | |
| 23/1991 | "So Sad" | Gregorian | |
| 24/1991 | "Joyride" | Roxette | |
| 25/1991 | "Hotel California" | Gipsy Kings | |
| 26/1991 | "Mega Mix" | Snap! | |
| 27/1991 | "Hotel California" | Gipsy Kings | |
| 28/1991 | "Hotel California" | Gipsy Kings | |
| 29/1991 | "Hotel California" | Gipsy Kings | |
| 30/1991 | "Hotel California" | Gipsy Kings | |
| 31/1991 | "(Everything I Do) I Do It for You" | Bryan Adams | |
| 32/1991 | "Logo Que Passe A Monção" | Rui Veloso | |
| 33/1991 | "Logo Que Passe A Monção" | Rui Veloso | |
| 34/1991 | "Taras e Manias" | Marco Paulo | |
| 35/1991 | "(Everything I Do) I Do It for You" | Bryan Adams | |
| 36/1991 | "Taras e Manias" | Marco Paulo | |
| 37/1991 | "Taras e Manias" | Marco Paulo | |
| 38/1991 | "(Everything I Do) I Do It for You" | Bryan Adams | |
| 39/1991 | "(Everything I Do) I Do It for You" | Bryan Adams | |
| 40/1991 | "(Everything I Do) I Do It for You" | Bryan Adams | |
| 41/1991 | "(Everything I Do) I Do It for You" | Bryan Adams | |
| 42/1991 | "Taras e Manias" | Marco Paulo | |
| 43/1991 | "(Everything I Do) I Do It for You" | Bryan Adams | |
| 44/1991 | "(Everything I Do) I Do It for You" | Bryan Adams | |
| 45/1991 | "(Everything I Do) I Do It for You" | Bryan Adams | |
| 46/1991 | "(Everything I Do) I Do It for You" | Bryan Adams | |
| 47/1991 | "Burbujas de Amor" | Juan Luis Guerra | |
| 48/1991 | "(Everything I Do) I Do It for You" | Bryan Adams | |
| 49/1991 | "(Everything I Do) I Do It for You" | Bryan Adams | |
| 50/1991 | "The Fly" | U2 | |
| 51/1991 | | | |

== See also ==
- List of number-one albums of 1991 (Portugal)
