= List of number-one singles of 1993 (Portugal) =

The Portuguese Albums Chart ranks the best-performing albums in Portugal, as compiled by the Associação Fonográfica Portuguesa.

Number-one singles in Portugal
← 1992 • 1993 • 1994 →

Week	Song	Artist	Reference
1/1993			
2/1993	"Maubere"	Rui Veloso	
3/1993	"Keep the Faith"	Bon Jovi	
4/1993	"The One"	Elton John	
5/1993	"Easy Come and Go"	Joker	
6/1993	"Sweat (A La La La La Long)"	Inner Circle	
7/1993	"Keep the Faith"	Bon Jovi	
8/1993	"What a Wonderful World"	Nick Cave and Shane MacGowan	
9/1993	"What a Wonderful World"	Nick Cave and Shane MacGowan	
10/1993	"Sweat (A La La La La Long)"	Inner Circle	
11/1993	"Easy Come and Go"	Joker	
12/1993	"Maubere"	Rui Veloso	
13/1993	"Sweat (A La La La La Long)"	Inner Circle	
14/1993	"Keep the Faith"	Bon Jovi	
15/1993	"No Limit"	2 Unlimited	
16/1993	"Sleeping Satellite"	Jody G	
17/1993	"I Will Always Love You"	Whitney Houston	
18/1993	"No Limit"	2 Unlimited	
19/1993	"Keep the Faith"	Bon Jovi	
20/1993	"Amante, Irmão, Amigo"	Marco Paulo	
21/1993	"Amante, Irmão, Amigo"	Marco Paulo	
22/1993	"Encores"	Dire Straits	
23/1993	"Somebody Dance with Me"	DJ BoBo	
24/1993	"Tribal Dance"	2 Unlimited	
25/1993	"Encores"	Dire Straits	
26/1993	"A Noite"	Resistência	
27/1993	"Amante, Irmão, Amigo"	Marco Paulo	
28/1993	"A Noite"	Resistência	
29/1993	"Encores"	Dire Straits	
30/1993	"Encores"	Dire Straits	
31/1993	"Encores"	Dire Straits	
32/1993	"Quem É Que Nunca Amou"	Toy	
33/1993	"Perco a Cabeça"	Marco Paulo	
34/1993	"Alright"	Kris Kross	
35/1993	"La Kabra"	Farmlopez	
36/1993	"Amante, Irmão, Amigo"	Marco Paulo	
37/1993	"What Is Love"	Haddaway	
38/1993	"The Love of a Woman"	Bernie Lyon	
39/1993	"The Love of a Woman"	Bernie Lyon	
40/1993	"Quem É Que Nunca Amou"	Toy	
41/1993	"Quem É Que Nunca Amou"	Toy	
42/1993	"Perco a Cabeça"	Marco Paulo	
43/1993	"Quem É Que Nunca Amou"	Toy	
44/1993	"La Vaca"	Big Beto & Los Kabrones	
45/1993	"La Vaca"	Big Beto & Los Kabrones	
46/1993	"What's Up"	Minnesota	
47/1993	"Please Forgive Me"	Bryan Adams	
48/1993	"La Vaca"	Big Beto & Los Kabrones	
49/1993	"Condemnation"	Depeche Mode	
50/1993	"Condemnation"	Depeche Mode	
51/1993	"4 Rave Songs"	UHF	
52/1993			

== See also ==
- List of number-one albums of 1993 (Portugal)
