= List of number-one albums of 1993 (Portugal) =

The Portuguese Albums Chart ranks the best-performing albums in Portugal, as compiled by the Associação Fonográfica Portuguesa.

Number-one albums in Portugal
← 1992 • 1993 • 1994 →

Week	Album	Artist	Reference
1/1993			
2/1993	ABBA Gold: Greatest Hits	ABBA	
3/1993	Número 1	Various	
4/1993	Número 1	Various	
5/1993	ABBA Gold: Greatest Hits	ABBA	
6/1993	ABBA Gold: Greatest Hits	ABBA	
7/1993	The Way We Walk, Volume Two: The Longs	Genesis	
8/1993	The Bodyguard: Original Soundtrack Album	Whitney Houston / Various	
9/1993	The Bodyguard: Original Soundtrack Album	Whitney Houston / Various	
10/1993	The Bodyguard: Original Soundtrack Album	Whitney Houston / Various	
11/1993	The Bodyguard: Original Soundtrack Album	Whitney Houston / Various	
12/1993	The Bodyguard: Original Soundtrack Album	Whitney Houston / Various	
13/1993	The Bodyguard: Original Soundtrack Album	Whitney Houston / Various	
14/1993	The Bodyguard: Original Soundtrack Album	Whitney Houston / Various	
15/1993	The Bodyguard: Original Soundtrack Album	Whitney Houston / Various	
16/1993	The Bodyguard: Original Soundtrack Album	Whitney Houston / Various	
17/1993	The Bodyguard: Original Soundtrack Album	Whitney Houston / Various	
18/1993	The Bodyguard: Original Soundtrack Album	Whitney Houston / Various	
19/1993	The Bodyguard: Original Soundtrack Album	Whitney Houston / Various	
20/1993	The Bodyguard: Original Soundtrack Album	Whitney Houston / Various	
21/1993	In Concert/MTV Plugged	Bruce Springsteen	
22/1993	The Bodyguard: Original Soundtrack Album	Whitney Houston / Various	
23/1993	The Bodyguard: Original Soundtrack Album	Whitney Houston / Various	
24/1993	In Concert/MTV Plugged	Bruce Springsteen	
25/1993	Five Live	George Michael, Queen, and Lisa Stansfield	
26/1993	Five Live	George Michael, Queen, and Lisa Stansfield	
27/1993	The Bodyguard: Original Soundtrack Album	Whitney Houston / Various	
28/1993	On The Night	Dire Straits	
29/1993	On The Night	Dire Straits	
30/1993	On The Night	Dire Straits	
31/1993	On The Night	Dire Straits	
32/1993	Love Classics	Various	
33/1993	Love Classics	Various	
34/1993	Love Classics	Various	
35/1993	Love Classics	Various	
36/1993	Tutte Storie	Eros Ramazzotti	
37/1993	16 Top World Charts '93	Various	
38/1993	Bigger, Better, Faster, More!	4 Non Blondes	
39/1993	Bigger, Better, Faster, More!	4 Non Blondes	
40/1993	Bigger, Better, Faster, More!	4 Non Blondes	
41/1993	Bigger, Better, Faster, More!	4 Non Blondes	
42/1993	La Kabra	The Farmlopez	
43/1993	La Kabra	The Farmlopez	
44/1993	Bigger, Better, Faster, More!	4 Non Blondes	
45/1993	La Kabra	The Farmlopez	
46/1993	Super Mix 8	Various	
47/1993	Super Mix 8	Various	
48/1993	Super Mix 8	Various	
49/1993	Super Mix 8	Various	
50/1993	Super Mix 8	Various	
51/1993	So Far So Good	Bryan Adams	
52/1993			

== See also ==
- List of number-one singles of 1993 (Portugal)
