= List of number-one singles of 2016 (Portugal) =

The Portuguese Singles Chart ranks the best-performing singles in Portugal, as compiled by the Associação Fonográfica Portuguesa.

Number-one singles of 2016 in Portugal
Week	Song	Artist	Reference
1	"Sorry"	Justin Bieber	
2	"Sorry"	Justin Bieber	
3	"Sorry"	Justin Bieber	
4	"Sorry"	Justin Bieber	
5	"Pillowtalk"	Zayn	
6	"Love Yourself"	Justin Bieber	
7	"Love Yourself"	Justin Bieber	
8	"Work"	Rihanna featuring Drake	
9	"Work"	Rihanna featuring Drake	
10	"Work"	Rihanna featuring Drake	
11	"Work"	Rihanna featuring Drake	
12	"Work"	Rihanna featuring Drake	
13	"Work"	Rihanna featuring Drake	
14	"Cheap Thrills"	Sia	
15	"Cheap Thrills"	Sia	
16	"Cheap Thrills"	Sia	
17	"Cheap Thrills"	Sia	
18	"One Dance"	Drake featuring Wizkid and Kyla	
19	"One Dance"	Drake featuring Wizkid and Kyla	
20	"One Dance"	Drake featuring Wizkid and Kyla	
21	"One Dance"	Drake featuring Wizkid and Kyla	
22	"One Dance"	Drake featuring Wizkid and Kyla	
23	"One Dance"	Drake featuring Wizkid and Kyla	
24	"One Dance"	Drake featuring Wizkid and Kyla	
25	"One Dance"	Drake featuring Wizkid and Kyla	
26	"One Dance"	Drake featuring Wizkid and Kyla	
27	"One Dance"	Drake featuring Wizkid and Kyla	
28	"This One's for You"	David Guetta featuring Zara Larsson	
29	"This One's for You"	David Guetta featuring Zara Larsson	
30	"One Dance"	Drake featuring Wizkid and Kyla	
31	"Cold Water"	Major Lazer featuring Justin Bieber and MØ	
32	"Cold Water"	Major Lazer featuring Justin Bieber and MØ	
33	"Cold Water"	Major Lazer featuring Justin Bieber and MØ	
34	"Cold Water"	Major Lazer featuring Justin Bieber and MØ	
35	"Let Me Love You"	DJ Snake featuring Justin Bieber	
36	"Let Me Love You"	DJ Snake featuring Justin Bieber	
37	"Let Me Love You"	DJ Snake featuring Justin Bieber	
38	"Let Me Love You"	DJ Snake featuring Justin Bieber	
39	"Let Me Love You"	DJ Snake featuring Justin Bieber	
40	"Let Me Love You"	DJ Snake featuring Justin Bieber	
41	"Let Me Love You"	DJ Snake featuring Justin Bieber	
42	"Let Me Love You"	DJ Snake featuring Justin Bieber	
43	"Starboy"	The Weeknd featuring Daft Punk	
44	"Starboy"	The Weeknd featuring Daft Punk	
45	"Starboy"	The Weeknd featuring Daft Punk	
46	"Starboy"	The Weeknd featuring Daft Punk	
47	"Starboy"	The Weeknd featuring Daft Punk	
48	"Starboy"	The Weeknd featuring Daft Punk	
49	"Starboy"	The Weeknd featuring Daft Punk	
50	"Starboy"	The Weeknd featuring Daft Punk	
51	"Starboy"	The Weeknd featuring Daft Punk	
52	"Starboy"	The Weeknd featuring Daft Punk	

== See also ==
- List of number-one albums of 2016 (Portugal)
