= List of number-one albums of 2008 (Portugal) =

The Portuguese Albums Chart ranks the best-performing albums in Portugal, as compiled by the Associação Fonográfica Portuguesa.

Number-one albums in Portugal
← 2007 • 2008 • 2009 →

Week	Album	Artist	Reference
1/2008	Just Girls	Just Girls	
2/2008	Just Girls	Just Girls	
3/2008	Just Girls	Just Girls	
4/2008	Just Girls	Just Girls	
5/2008	Just Girls	Just Girls	
6/2008	Just Girls	Just Girls	
7/2008	Just Girls	Just Girls	
8/2008	Back to Black	Amy Winehouse	
9/2008	Back to Black	Amy Winehouse	
10/2008	Back to Black	Amy Winehouse	
11/2008	Kizomba Brasil	Various	
12/2008	Kizomba Brasil	Various	
13/2008	Kizomba Brasil	Various	
14/2008	Kizomba Brasil	Various	
15/2008	Kizomba Brasil	Various	
16/2008	Kizomba Brasil	Various	
17/2008	Kizomba Brasil	Various	
18/2008	Sempre de Mim	Camané	
19/2008	Hard Candy	Madonna	
20/2008	O Melhor de Mim	Marco Paulo	
21/2008	Sempre de Mim	Camané	
22/2008	Sempre de Mim	Camané	
23/2008	Winx Club	Winx Club	
24/2008	Back to Black	Amy Winehouse	
25/2008	Back to Black	Amy Winehouse	
26/2008	Viva la Vida or Death and All His Friends	Coldplay	
27/2008	Viva la Vida or Death and All His Friends	Coldplay	
28/2008	Terra	Mariza	
29/2008	Terra	Mariza	
30/2008	Terra	Mariza	
31/2008	Terra	Mariza	
32/2008	Terra	Mariza	
33/2008	Terra	Mariza	
34/2008	Terra	Mariza	
35/2008	Terra	Mariza	
36/2008	Terra	Mariza	
37/2008	Terra	Mariza	
38/2008	Death Magnetic	Metallica	
39/2008	Death Magnetic	Metallica	
40/2008	Mamma Mia! The Movie Soundtrack	Mamma Mia! film cast	
41/2008	Mamma Mia! The Movie Soundtrack	Mamma Mia! film cast	
42/2008	Mamma Mia! The Movie Soundtrack	Mamma Mia! film cast	
43/2008	Mamma Mia! The Movie Soundtrack	Mamma Mia! film cast	
44/2008	Mamma Mia! The Movie Soundtrack	Mamma Mia! film cast	
45/2008	Mamma Mia! The Movie Soundtrack	Mamma Mia! film cast	
46/2008	Mamma Mia! The Movie Soundtrack	Mamma Mia! film cast	
47/2008	The Promise	Il Divo	
48/2008	The Promise	Il Divo	
49/2008	O Homem Que Sou	Tony Carreira	
50/2008	O Homem Que Sou	Tony Carreira	
51/2008	O Homem Que Sou	Tony Carreira	
52/2008	O Homem Que Sou	Tony Carreira	
