= List of number-one albums of 2002 (Portugal) =

The Portuguese Albums Chart ranks the best-performing albums in Portugal, as compiled by the Associação Fonográfica Portuguesa.

Number-one albums in Portugal
← 2001 • 2002 • 2003 →

Week	Album	Artist	Reference
1/2002	Echoes: The Best of Pink Floyd	Pink Floyd	
2/2002	Echoes: The Best of Pink Floyd	Pink Floyd	
3/2002	The Hits – Chapter One	Backstreet Boys	
4/2002	Echoes: The Best of Pink Floyd	Pink Floyd	
5/2002	The Hits – Chapter One	Backstreet Boys	
6/2002	The Hits – Chapter One	Backstreet Boys	
7/2002	Sucessos Portugueses em Gregoriano	Divinus	
8/2002	Sucessos Portugueses em Gregoriano	Divinus	
9/2002	Sucessos Portugueses em Gregoriano	Divinus	
10/2002	Sucessos Portugueses em Gregoriano	Divinus	
11/2002	Câmara Lenta	GNR	
12/2002	Câmara Lenta	GNR	
13/2002	Laundry Service	Shakira	
14/2002	Laundry Service	Shakira	
15/2002	Laundry Service	Shakira	
16/2002	Laundry Service	Shakira	
17/2002	Laundry Service	Shakira	
18/2002	Laundry Service	Shakira	
19/2002	Só Eu Sei Porque Não Fico Em Casa	Juventude Leonina	
20/2002	Só Eu Sei Porque Não Fico Em Casa	Juventude Leonina	
21/2002	Só Eu Sei Porque Não Fico Em Casa	Juventude Leonina	
22/2002	Só Eu Sei Porque Não Fico Em Casa	Juventude Leonina	
23/2002	Só Eu Sei Porque Não Fico Em Casa	Juventude Leonina	
24/2002	Laundry Service	Shakira	
25/2002	Laundry Service	Shakira	
26/2002	Laundry Service	Shakira	
27/2002	Come Away With Me	Norah Jones	
28/2002	Laundry Service	Shakira	
29/2002	Laundry Service	Shakira	
30/2002	Laundry Service	Shakira	
31/2002	Laundry Service	Shakira	
32/2002	Laundry Service	Shakira	
33/2002	Laundry Service	Shakira	
34/2002	Laundry Service	Shakira	
35/2002	Laundry Service	Shakira	
36/2002	Laundry Service	Shakira	
37/2002	Laundry Service	Shakira	
38/2002	Laundry Service	Shakira	
39/2002	Laundry Service	Shakira	
40/2002	Laundry Service	Shakira	
41/2002	Stars: The Best of 1992–2002	The Cranberries	
42/2002	Forty Licks	The Rolling Stones	
43/2002	Forty Licks	The Rolling Stones	
44/2002	Hijas del Tomate	Las Ketchup	
45/2002	Hijas del Tomate	Las Ketchup	
46/2002	The Best of 1990–2000	U2	
47/2002	The Best of 1990–2000	U2	
48/2002	The Best of 1990–2000	U2	
49/2002	The Best of 1990–2000	U2	
50/2002	Momento	Pedro Abrunhosa	
51/2002	Momento	Pedro Abrunhosa	
52/2002	Momento	Pedro Abrunhosa	
