= List of number-one albums of 2025 (Portugal) =

The Portuguese Albums Chart ranks the best-performing albums in Portugal, as compiled by the Associação Fonográfica Portuguesa.

Number-one albums in Portugal
← 2024 • 2025

Number-one albums of 2025 in Portugal
Week	Album	Artist	Reference
1	Carta de Alforria	Plutónio	
2	Carta de Alforria	Plutónio	
3	Debí Tirar Más Fotos	Bad Bunny	
4	Debí Tirar Más Fotos	Bad Bunny	
5	Debí Tirar Más Fotos	Bad Bunny	
6	Hurry Up Tomorrow	The Weeknd	
7	GNX	Kendrick Lamar	
8	GNX	Kendrick Lamar	
9	So Close to What (Note: Both AFP's Top 200 Álbuns, and Hung Medien's Portuguese Charts (which mirrors the former), rank So Close to What as the number-one album of the week, although it is given a No. 2 peak position in subsequent weeks.)	Tate McRae	
10	Carta de Alforria	Plutónio	
11	Mayhem	Lady Gaga	
12	Music	Playboi Carti	
13	Carta de Alforria	Plutónio	
14	Carta de Alforria	Plutónio	
15	Carta de Alforria	Plutónio	
16	Carta de Alforria	Plutónio	
17	Carta de Alforria	Plutónio	
18	Carta de Alforria	Plutónio	
19	Debí Tirar Más Fotos	Bad Bunny	
20	Debí Tirar Más Fotos	Bad Bunny	
21	Debí Tirar Más Fotos	Bad Bunny	
22	Debí Tirar Más Fotos	Bad Bunny	
23	Debí Tirar Más Fotos	Bad Bunny	
24	Debí Tirar Más Fotos	Bad Bunny	
25	Debí Tirar Más Fotos	Bad Bunny	
26	Debí Tirar Más Fotos	Bad Bunny	
27	Eu Venci o Mundo	Veigh	
28	Eu Venci o Mundo	Veigh	
29	Swag	Justin Bieber	
30	Don't Tap the Glass	Tyler, the Creator	
31	Debí Tirar Más Fotos	Bad Bunny	
32	Debí Tirar Más Fotos	Bad Bunny	
33	Debí Tirar Más Fotos	Bad Bunny	
34	Carta de Alforria	Plutónio	
35	Karma	Stray Kids	
36	Man's Best Friend	Sabrina Carpenter	
37	Man's Best Friend	Sabrina Carpenter	
38	Man's Best Friend	Sabrina Carpenter	
39	Man's Best Friend	Sabrina Carpenter	
40	Man's Best Friend	Sabrina Carpenter	
41	The Life of a Showgirl	Taylor Swift	
42	The Life of a Showgirl	Taylor Swift	
43	The Life of a Showgirl	Taylor Swift	
44	The Life of a Showgirl	Taylor Swift	
45	The Life of a Showgirl	Taylor Swift	
46	Lux	Rosalía	
47	Lux	Rosalía	
48	Lux	Rosalía	
49	Lux	Rosalía	
50	Lux	Rosalía	
51	Lux	Rosalía	
52	Lux	Rosalía	

== See also ==
- List of number-one singles of 2025 (Portugal)
