= N.1 (David Carreira album) =

n. 1 (Nº 1)

Studio album by David Carreira
- Released: 17 October 2011
- Genre: Pop, dance music, hip hop, R&B
- Length: 47:12
- Language: Portuguese, English, French
- Label: Farol Música

David Carreira chronology
n. 1 (Nº 1) (2011)	A força está em nós (2013)

Singles from N.1
- 1. "Esta Noite" Released: 10 September 2010

n.1 or Nº 1 (read as Número 1 in Portuguese) is the debut album of the French-born Portuguese singer David Carreira. It was released on 17 October 2011 on the Portuguese Farol Música label and reached number one on the official Portuguese Albums Chart.

== Track listing ==
No.	Title	Length
1.	"O Mundo a Teus Pés" (featuring Iminente)	3:59
2.	"Esta Noite" (featuring Jmi Sissoko)	3:29
3.	"Shut Down"	3:15
4.	"Só Tu e Eu"	3:40
5.	"Tu"	3:30
6.	"I Gave You the World"	3:40
7.	"Burning Like Fire" (featuring Cali and Mundo Secreto)	3:35
8.	"Lembra-te de Me Esquecer"	2:28
9.	"Num Dia Assim"	3:46
10.	"Como na Primeira Vez"	3:29
11.	"Perdido"	3:35
12.	"Need Love"	3:40
13.	"Falling Into You"	3:40
14.	"Shining Star" (featuring Iminente)	3:59
15.	"Só Tu e Eu" (featuring Léa Castel)	3:39

== Charts ==
Chart (2011)	Peak position
Portuguese Albums Chart	1
