= List of number-one albums of 2001 (Portugal) =

The Portuguese Albums Chart ranks the best-performing albums in Portugal, as compiled by the Associação Fonográfica Portuguesa.

Number-one albums in Portugal
← 2000 • 2001 • 2002 →

Week	Album	Artist	Reference
1/2001	1	The Beatles	
2/2001	1	The Beatles	
3/2001	O Melhor de Rui Veloso - 20 Anos Depois	Rui Veloso	
4/2001	O Melhor de Rui Veloso - 20 Anos Depois	Rui Veloso	
5/2001	O Melhor de Rui Veloso - 20 Anos Depois	Rui Veloso	
6/2001	O Melhor de Rui Veloso - 20 Anos Depois	Rui Veloso	
7/2001	O Melhor de Rui Veloso - 20 Anos Depois	Rui Veloso	
8/2001	Lara Fabian	Lara Fabian	
9/2001	Lara Fabian	Lara Fabian	
10/2001	Lara Fabian	Lara Fabian	
11/2001	Lara Fabian	Lara Fabian	
12/2001	Lara Fabian	Lara Fabian	
13/2001	Lara Fabian	Lara Fabian	
14/2001	Lara Fabian	Lara Fabian	
15/2001	Lara Fabian	Lara Fabian	
16/2001	Lara Fabian	Lara Fabian	
17/2001	Lara Fabian	Lara Fabian	
18/2001	Lara Fabian	Lara Fabian	
19/2001	Lara Fabian	Lara Fabian	
20/2001	Lara Fabian	Lara Fabian	
21/2001	Lara Fabian	Lara Fabian	
22/2001	Lara Fabian	Lara Fabian	
23/2001	Acoustica	Scorpions	
24/2001	Acoustica	Scorpions	
25/2001	Acoustica	Scorpions	
26/2001	Acoustica	Scorpions	
27/2001	Acoustica	Scorpions	
28/2001	Acoustica	Scorpions	
29/2001	Acoustica	Scorpions	
30/2001	Acoustica	Scorpions	
31/2001	Acoustica	Scorpions	
32/2001	Acoustica	Scorpions	
33/2001	Acoustica	Scorpions	
34/2001	Hotshot	Shaggy	
35/2001	Hotshot	Shaggy	
36/2001	Hotshot	Shaggy	
37/2001	Hotshot	Shaggy	
38/2001	Morango do Nordeste	Canta Bahia	
39/2001	Morango do Nordeste	Canta Bahia	
40/2001	Morango do Nordeste	Canta Bahia	
41/2001	The Look of Love	Diana Krall	
42/2001	The Look of Love	Diana Krall	
43/2001	The Look of Love	Diana Krall	
44/2001	The Look of Love	Diana Krall	
45/2001	The Look of Love	Diana Krall	
46/2001	The Look of Love	Diana Krall	
47/2001	Echoes: The Best of Pink Floyd	Pink Floyd	
48/2001	Echoes: The Best of Pink Floyd	Pink Floyd	
49/2001	Echoes: The Best of Pink Floyd	Pink Floyd	
50/2001	Echoes: The Best of Pink Floyd	Pink Floyd	
51/2001	Echoes: The Best of Pink Floyd	Pink Floyd	
52/2001	Echoes: The Best of Pink Floyd	Pink Floyd	
