= List of number-one albums of 1999 (Portugal) =

The Portuguese Albums Chart ranks the best-performing albums in Portugal, as compiled by the Associação Fonográfica Portuguesa.

Number-one albums in Portugal
← 1998 • 1999 • 2000 →

Week	Album	Artist	Reference
1/1999	Silence Becomes It	Silence 4	
2/1999	Silence Becomes It	Silence 4	
3/1999	Silence Becomes It	Silence 4	
4/1999	Silence Becomes It	Silence 4	
5/1999	Believe	Cher	
6/1999	Believe	Cher	
7/1999	Believe	Cher	
8/1999	Believe	Cher	
9/1999	Love Stories	ABBA	
10/1999	Love Stories	ABBA	
11/1999	Love Stories	ABBA	
12/1999	Love Stories	ABBA	
13/1999	Love Stories	ABBA	
14/1999	Love Stories	ABBA	
15/1999	Sogno	Andrea Bocelli	
16/1999	Sogno	Andrea Bocelli	
17/1999	Sogno	Andrea Bocelli	
18/1999	Sogno	Andrea Bocelli	
19/1999	Sogno	Andrea Bocelli	
20/1999	Sogno	Andrea Bocelli	
21/1999	Sogno	Andrea Bocelli	
22/1999	Sogno	Andrea Bocelli	
23/1999	Millennium	Backstreet Boys	
24/1999	Sogno	Andrea Bocelli	
25/1999	Millennium	Backstreet Boys	
26/1999	Sogno	Andrea Bocelli	
27/1999	Millennium	Backstreet Boys	
28/1999	...Baby One More Time	Britney Spears	
29/1999	Voar	Santos & Pecadores	
30/1999	Millennium	Backstreet Boys	
31/1999	Uma Noite Só	Trovante	
32/1999	Uma Noite Só	Trovante	
33/1999	Uma Noite Só	Trovante	
34/1999	Voar	Santos & Pecadores	
35/1999	¡Volaré! The Very Best of the Gipsy Kings	Gipsy Kings	
36/1999	¡Volaré! The Very Best of the Gipsy Kings	Gipsy Kings	
37/1999	The Party Album	Vengaboys	
38/1999	The Party Album	Vengaboys	
39/1999	A Little Bit of Mambo	Lou Bega	
40/1999	A Little Bit of Mambo	Lou Bega	
41/1999	A Little Bit of Mambo	Lou Bega	
42/1999	A Little Bit of Mambo	Lou Bega	
43/1999	Best	Scorpions	
44/1999	Best	Scorpions	
45/1999	Best	Scorpions	
46/1999	Best	Scorpions	
47/1999	Best	Scorpions	
48/1999	Best	Scorpions	
49/1999	Best	Scorpions	
50/1999	S&M	Metallica and the San Francisco Symphony	
51/1999	MTV Unplugged	Alanis Morissette	
52/1999	MTV Unplugged	Alanis Morissette	
