= List of number-one albums of 2014 (Portugal) =

The Portuguese Albums Chart ranks the best-performing albums in Portugal, as tracked by the Associação Fonográfica Portuguesa.

Number-one albums in Portugal
← 2013 • 2014 • 2015 →

Week	Album	Artist	Reference
1/2014	25 Anos	Tony Carreira	
2/2014	Violetta	Soundtrack	
3/2014	Puro	Xutos & Pontapés	
4/2014	Puro	Xutos & Pontapés	
5/2014	Duetos	Paulo Gonzo	
6/2014	Duetos	Paulo Gonzo	
7/2014	Duetos	Paulo Gonzo	
8/2014	Duetos	Paulo Gonzo	
9/2014	Duetos	Paulo Gonzo	
10/2014	Violetta	Soundtrack	
11/2014	A Bunch of Meninos	Dead Combo	
12/2014	True	The Legendary Tigerman	
13/2014	True	The Legendary Tigerman	
14/2014	True	The Legendary Tigerman	
15/2014	True	The Legendary Tigerman	
16/2014	Best of Mariza	Mariza	
17/2014	Best of Mariza	Mariza	
18/2014	Best of Mariza	Mariza	
19/2014	Best of Mariza	Mariza	
20/2014	Violetta – A música é o meu mundo	Soundtrack	
21/2014	Ghost Stories	Coldplay	
22/2014	Violetta – A música é o meu mundo	Soundtrack	
23/2014	Violetta – A música é o meu mundo	Soundtrack	
24/2014	Violetta – A música é o meu mundo	Soundtrack	
25/2014	The Hunting Party	Linkin Park	
26/2014	Violetta – A música é o meu mundo	Soundtrack	
27/2014	5 Seconds of Summer	5 Seconds of Summer	
28/2014	Violetta – A música é o meu mundo	Soundtrack	
29/2014	Best of Mariza	Mariza	
30/2014	Best of Mariza	Mariza	
31/2014	Best of Mariza	Mariza	
32/2014	A Dor do Cupido	Anselmo Ralph	
33/2014	A Dor do Cupido	Anselmo Ralph	
34/2014	A Dor do Cupido	Anselmo Ralph	
35/2014	A Dor do Cupido	Anselmo Ralph	
36/2014	A Dor do Cupido	Anselmo Ralph	
37/2014	A Dor do Cupido	Anselmo Ralph	
38/2014	Violetta – A música é o meu mundo	Soundtrack	
39/2014	Popular Problems	Leonard Cohen	
40/2014	Popular Problems	Leonard Cohen	
41/2014	O Espírito de um País	Rodrigo Leão	
42/2014	Songs of Innocence	U2	
43/2014	Songs of Innocence	U2	
44/2014	Songs of Innocence	U2	
45/2014	Canto	Carminho	
46/2014	The Endless River	Pink Floyd	
47/2014	Four	One Direction	
48/2014	The Endless River	Pink Floyd	
49/2014	The Endless River	Pink Floyd	
50/2014	The Endless River	Pink Floyd	
51/2014	Sempre	Tony Carreira	
52/2014	Sempre	Tony Carreira	
