= List of number-one albums of 2013 (Portugal) =

The Portuguese Albums Chart ranks the best-performing albums in Portugal, as tracked by the Associação Fonográfica Portuguesa.

Number-one albums in Portugal
← 2012 • 2013 • 2014 →

Week	Album	Artist	Reference
1/2013	Essencial	Tony Carreira	
2/2013	Essencial	Tony Carreira	
3/2013	Essencial	Tony Carreira	
4/2013	Essencial	Tony Carreira	
5/2013	Essencial	Tony Carreira	
6/2013	Essencial	Tony Carreira	
7/2013	Essencial	Tony Carreira	
8/2013	Push the Sky Away	Nick Cave & the Bad Seeds	
9/2013	En Acústico	Pablo Alborán	
10/2013	En Acústico	Pablo Alborán	
11/2013	The Next Day	David Bowie	
12/2013	Essencial	Tony Carreira	
13/2013	Essencial	Tony Carreira	
14/2013	Essencial	Tony Carreira	
15/2013	Essencial	Tony Carreira	
16/2013	Essencial	Tony Carreira	
17/2013	To Be Loved	Michael Bublé	
18/2013	Essencial	Tony Carreira	
19/2013	Essencial	Tony Carreira	
20/2013	Essencial	Tony Carreira	
21/2013	Random Access Memories	Daft Punk	
22/2013	Random Access Memories	Daft Punk	
23/2013	...Like Clockwork	Queens of the Stone Age	
24/2013	Desfado	Ana Moura	
25/2013	Desfado	Ana Moura	
26/2013	Desfado	Ana Moura	
27/2013	Desfado	Ana Moura	
28/2013	Gisela João	Gisela João	
29/2013	Love, Lust, Faith and Dreams	Thirty Seconds to Mars	
30/2013	Desfado	Ana Moura	
31/2013	Desfado	Ana Moura	
32/2013	Liliane Marise	Liliane Marise	
33/2013	Liliane Marise	Liliane Marise	
34/2013	Liliane Marise	Liliane Marise	
35/2013	Liliane Marise	Liliane Marise	
36/2013	Liliane Marise	Liliane Marise	
37/2013	AM	Arctic Monkeys	
38/2013	Quinto	António Zambujo	
39/2013	Quinto	António Zambujo	
40/2013	As Canções da Maria II	Maria de Vasconcelos	
41/2013	As Canções da Maria II	Maria de Vasconcelos	
42/2013	Lightning Bolt	Pearl Jam	
43/2013	Lightning Bolt	Pearl Jam	
44/2013	Reflektor	Arcade Fire	
45/2013	Fado é amor	Carlos do Carmo	
46/2013	Fado é amor	Carlos do Carmo	
47/2013	Lisboa 22:38 - Ao Vivo no Coliseu	António Zambujo	
48/2013	Midnight Memories	One Direction	
49/2013	25 Anos	Tony Carreira	
50/2013	25 Anos	Tony Carreira	
51/2013	25 Anos	Tony Carreira	
52/2013	25 Anos	Tony Carreira	
