= List of number-one albums of 2007 (Portugal) =

The Portuguese Albums Chart ranks the best-performing albums in Portugal, as compiled by the Associação Fonográfica Portuguesa.

Number-one albums in Portugal
← 2006 • 2007 • 2008 →

Week	Album	Artist	Reference
1/2007	4Taste	4Taste	
2/2007	A vida que eu escolhi	Tony Carreira	
3/2007	Acústico	André Sardet	
4/2007	A vida que eu escolhi	Tony Carreira	
5/2007	A vida que eu escolhi	Tony Carreira	
6/2007	The Confessions Tour	Madonna	
7/2007	The Confessions Tour	Madonna	
8/2007	The Confessions Tour	Madonna	
9/2007	A vida que eu escolhi	Tony Carreira	
10/2007	José Afonso	José Afonso	
11/2007	José Afonso	José Afonso	
12/2007	José Afonso	José Afonso	
13/2007	José Afonso	José Afonso	
14/2007	José Afonso	José Afonso	
15/2007	Amor, Escárnio e Maldizer	Da Weasel	
16/2007	Amor, Escárnio e Maldizer	Da Weasel	
17/2007	José Afonso	José Afonso	
18/2007	José Afonso	José Afonso	
19/2007	José Afonso	José Afonso	
20/2007	José Afonso	José Afonso	
21/2007	José Afonso	José Afonso	
22/2007	José Afonso	José Afonso	
23/2007	José Afonso	José Afonso	
24/2007	Floribella 2	Flor	
25/2007	Floribella 2	Flor	
26/2007	Floribella 2	Flor	
27/2007	Luz	Pedro Abrunhosa	
28/2007	Floribella 2	Flor	
29/2007	Floribella 2	Flor	
30/2007	Fantasminha Brincalhão	Avô Cantigas	
31/2007	Fantasminha Brincalhão	Avô Cantigas	
32/2007	Fantasminha Brincalhão	Avô Cantigas	
33/2007	Fantasminha Brincalhão	Avô Cantigas	
34/2007	Fantasminha Brincalhão	Avô Cantigas	
35/2007	Lado a Lado	Mafalda Veiga and João Pedro Pais	
36/2007	Chiquititas 2007	Chiquititas	
37/2007	Chiquititas 2007	Chiquititas	
38/2007	Chiquititas 2007	Chiquititas	
39/2007	Chiquititas 2007	Chiquititas	
40/2007	Chiquititas 2007	Chiquititas	
41/2007	Chiquititas 2007	Chiquititas	
42/2007	Dreams in Colour	David Fonseca	
43/2007	Chiquititas 2007	Chiquititas	
44/2007	Concerto em Lisboa	Mariza	
45/2007	Voo Nocturno	Jorge Palma	
46/2007	Voo Nocturno	Jorge Palma	
47/2007	Voo Nocturno	Jorge Palma	
48/2007	Voo Nocturno	Jorge Palma	
49/2007	Just Girls	Just Girls	
50/2007	Just Girls	Just Girls	
51/2007	Just Girls	Just Girls	
52/2007	Just Girls	Just Girls	
