= List of number-one albums of 1996 (Portugal) =

The Portuguese Albums Chart ranks the best-performing albums in Portugal, as compiled by the Associação Fonográfica Portuguesa.

Number-one albums in Portugal
← 1995 • 1996 • 1997 →

Week	Album	Artist	Reference
1/1996	Made In Heaven	Queen	
2/1996	Made In Heaven	Queen	
3/1996	O Caminho da Felicidade	Delfins	
4/1996	O Caminho da Felicidade	Delfins	
5/1996	O Caminho da Felicidade	Delfins	
6/1996	O Caminho da Felicidade	Delfins	
7/1996	O Caminho da Felicidade	Delfins	
8/1996	O Caminho da Felicidade	Delfins	
9/1996	O Caminho da Felicidade	Delfins	
10/1996	O Caminho da Felicidade	Delfins	
11/1996	O Caminho da Felicidade	Delfins	
12/1996	O Caminho da Felicidade	Delfins	
13/1996	Mamonas Assassinas	Mamonas Assassinas	
14/1996	Mamonas Assassinas	Mamonas Assassinas	
15/1996	O Caminho da Felicidade	Delfins	
16/1996	Mamonas Assassinas	Mamonas Assassinas	
17/1996	Mamonas Assassinas	Mamonas Assassinas	
18/1996	Portraits (So Long Ago, So Clear)	Vangelis	
19/1996	Portraits (So Long Ago, So Clear)	Vangelis	
20/1996	Portraits (So Long Ago, So Clear)	Vangelis	
21/1996	Portraits (So Long Ago, So Clear)	Vangelis	
22/1996	Older	George Michael	
23/1996	Older	George Michael	
24/1996	Older	George Michael	
25/1996	Load	Metallica	
26/1996	Tudo O Que Você Queria	GNR	
27/1996	Tudo O Que Você Queria	GNR	
28/1996	O Caminho da Felicidade	Delfins	
29/1996	Tudo O Que Você Queria	GNR	
30/1996	Tudo O Que Você Queria	GNR	
31/1996	Dreamland	Robert Miles	
32/1996	O Caminho da Felicidade	Delfins	
33/1996	O Caminho da Felicidade	Delfins	
34/1996	O Caminho da Felicidade	Delfins	
35/1996	O Caminho da Felicidade	Delfins	
36/1996	O Caminho da Felicidade	Delfins	
37/1996	No Code	Pearl Jam	
38/1996	No Code	Pearl Jam	
39/1996	Jagged Little Pill	Alanis Morissette	
40/1996	No Code	Pearl Jam	
41/1996	Jagged Little Pill	Alanis Morissette	
42/1996	From the Muddy Banks of the Wishkah	Nirvana	
43/1996	Le cose che vivi	Laura Pausini	
44/1996	From the Muddy Banks of the Wishkah	Nirvana	
45/1996	Greatest Hits	Simply Red	
46/1996	Dance Into The Light	Phil Collins	
47/1996	Chopin: The Nocturnes	Maria João Pires	
48/1996	Tempo	Pedro Abrunhosa	
49/1996	Tempo	Pedro Abrunhosa	
50/1996	Tempo	Pedro Abrunhosa	
51/1996			
52/1996			
