= List of number-one albums of 2012 (Portugal) =

The Portuguese Albums Chart ranks the best-performing albums in Portugal, as compiled by the Associação Fonográfica Portuguesa.

Number-one albums in Portugal
← 2011 • 2012 • 2013 →

Week	Album	Artist	Reference
01/2012	En Acústico	Pablo Alborán	
02/2012	En Acústico	Pablo Alborán	
03/2012	En Acústico	Pablo Alborán	
04/2012	En Acústico	Pablo Alborán	
05/2012	En Acústico	Pablo Alborán	
06/2012	En Acústico	Pablo Alborán	
07/2012	En Acústico	Pablo Alborán	
08/2012	En Acústico	Pablo Alborán	
09/2012	En Acústico	Pablo Alborán	
10/2012	En Acústico	Pablo Alborán	
11/2012	Alma	Carminho	
12/2012	En Acústico	Pablo Alborán	
13/2012	En Acústico	Pablo Alborán	
14/2012	En Acústico	Pablo Alborán	
15/2012	En Acústico	Pablo Alborán	
16/2012	En Acústico	Pablo Alborán	
17/2012	En Acústico	Pablo Alborán	
18/2012	En Acústico	Pablo Alborán	
19/2012	En Acústico	Pablo Alborán	
20/2012	En Acústico	Pablo Alborán	
21/2012	En Acústico	Pablo Alborán	
22/2012	En Acústico	Pablo Alborán	
23/2012	En Acústico	Pablo Alborán	
24/2012	En Acústico	Pablo Alborán	
25/2012	En Acústico	Pablo Alborán	
26/2012	En Acústico	Pablo Alborán	
27/2012	Living Things	Linkin Park	
28/2012	En Acústico	Pablo Alborán	
29/2012	En Acústico	Pablo Alborán	
30/2012	En Acústico	Pablo Alborán	
31/2012	En Acústico	Pablo Alborán	
32/2012	En Acústico	Pablo Alborán	
33/2012	En Acústico	Pablo Alborán	
34/2012	En Acústico	Pablo Alborán	
35/2012	En Acústico	Pablo Alborán	
36/2012	En Acústico	Pablo Alborán	
37/2012	En Acústico	Pablo Alborán	
38/2012	Coexist	The xx	
39/2012	Coexist	The xx	
40/2012	Ao Vivo	Paula Fernandes	
41/2012	The 2nd Law	Muse	
42/2012	The 2nd Law	Muse	
43/2012	The 2nd Law	Muse	
44/2012	The 2nd Law	Muse	
45/2012	Ao Vivo	Paula Fernandes	
46/2012	Tanto	Pablo Alborán	
47/2012	Take Me Home	One Direction	
48/2012	Take Me Home	One Direction	
49/2012	Essencial	Tony Carreira	
50/2012	Essencial	Tony Carreira	
51/2012	Essencial	Tony Carreira	
52/2012	Essencial	Tony Carreira	
53/2012	Essencial	Tony Carreira	
