= List of number-one albums of 1998 (Portugal) =

The Portuguese Albums Chart ranks the best-performing albums in Portugal, as compiled by the Associação Fonográfica Portuguesa.

Number-one albums in Portugal
← 1997 • 1998 • 1999 →

Week	Album	Artist	Reference
1/1998			
2/1998	Romanza	Andrea Bocelli	
3/1998	Feijão Com Arroz	Daniela Mercury	
4/1998	Eu Sou Aquele	Excesso	
5/1998	Eu Sou Aquele	Excesso	
6/1998	Eu Sou Aquele	Excesso	
7/1998	Eu Sou Aquele	Excesso	
8/1998	Titanic: Music from the Motion Picture	James Horner	
9/1998	Titanic: Music from the Motion Picture	James Horner	
10/1998	Titanic: Music from the Motion Picture	James Horner	
11/1998	Titanic: Music from the Motion Picture	James Horner	
12/1998	Titanic: Music from the Motion Picture	James Horner	
13/1998	Titanic: Music from the Motion Picture	James Horner	
14/1998	Titanic: Music from the Motion Picture	James Horner	
15/1998	Titanic: Music from the Motion Picture	James Horner	
16/1998	Titanic: Music from the Motion Picture	James Horner	
17/1998	Vuelve	Ricky Martin	
18/1998	Era	Era	
19/1998	Era	Era	
20/1998	Vuelve	Ricky Martin	
21/1998	Era	Era	
22/1998	Era	Era	
23/1998	Era	Era	
24/1998	Era	Era	
25/1998	Adore	The Smashing Pumpkins	
26/1998	Adore	The Smashing Pumpkins	
27/1998	Netinho Ao Vivo!	Netinho	
28/1998	Netinho Ao Vivo!	Netinho	
29/1998	Netinho Ao Vivo!	Netinho	
30/1998	Netinho Ao Vivo!	Netinho	
31/1998	Netinho Ao Vivo!	Netinho	
32/1998	Netinho Ao Vivo!	Netinho	
33/1998	Netinho Ao Vivo!	Netinho	
34/1998	Netinho Ao Vivo!	Netinho	
35/1998	Netinho Ao Vivo!	Netinho	
36/1998	Netinho Ao Vivo!	Netinho	
37/1998	Silence Becomes It	Silence 4	
38/1998	Silence Becomes It	Silence 4	
39/1998	Silence Becomes It	Silence 4	
40/1998	Silence Becomes It	Silence 4	
41/1998	Silence Becomes It	Silence 4	
42/1998	Silence Becomes It	Silence 4	
43/1998	Silence Becomes It	Silence 4	
44/1998	Silence Becomes It	Silence 4	
45/1998	Silence Becomes It	Silence 4	
46/1998	Silence Becomes It	Silence 4	
47/1998	The Best of 1980–1990	U2	
48/1998	The Best of 1980–1990	U2	
49/1998	The Best of 1980–1990	U2	
50/1998	The Best of 1980–1990	U2	
51/1998	The Best of 1980–1990	U2	
52/1998	The Best of 1980–1990	U2	
