= List of number-one albums of 1997 (Portugal) =

The Portuguese Albums Chart ranks the best-performing albums in Portugal, as compiled by the Associação Fonográfica Portuguesa.

Number-one albums in Portugal
← 1996 • 1997 • 1998 →

Week	Album	Artist	Reference
1/1997			
2/1997	Tempo	Pedro Abrunhosa	
3/1997	Tempo	Pedro Abrunhosa	
4/1997	Saber A Mar	Delfins	
5/1997	Saber A Mar	Delfins	
6/1997	Saber A Mar	Delfins	
7/1997	The Best of Vaya Con Dios	Vaya Con Dios	
8/1997	The Best of Vaya Con Dios	Vaya Con Dios	
9/1997	The Best of Vaya Con Dios	Vaya Con Dios	
10/1997	The Best of Vaya Con Dios	Vaya Con Dios	
11/1997	The Best of Vaya Con Dios	Vaya Con Dios	
12/1997	Pop	U2	
13/1997	Pop	U2	
14/1997	Rio Grande	Rio Grande	
15/1997	Spice	Spice Girls	
16/1997	Spice	Spice Girls	
17/1997	Spice	Spice Girls	
18/1997	Spice	Spice Girls	
19/1997	Spice	Spice Girls	
20/1997	Spice	Spice Girls	
21/1997	O Melhor de António Variações	António Variações	
22/1997	O Melhor de António Variações	António Variações	
23/1997	O Melhor de António Variações	António Variações	
24/1997	O Melhor de António Variações	António Variações	
25/1997	Quase Tudo	Paulo Gonzo	
26/1997	Quase Tudo	Paulo Gonzo	
27/1997	Quase Tudo	Paulo Gonzo	
28/1997	Quase Tudo	Paulo Gonzo	
29/1997	The Fat of the Land	The Prodigy	
30/1997	Quase Tudo	Paulo Gonzo	
31/1997	Quase Tudo	Paulo Gonzo	
32/1997	Quase Tudo	Paulo Gonzo	
33/1997	Quase Tudo	Paulo Gonzo	
34/1997	Quase Tudo	Paulo Gonzo	
35/1997	Quase Tudo	Paulo Gonzo	
36/1997	Quase Tudo	Paulo Gonzo	
37/1997	Quase Tudo	Paulo Gonzo	
38/1997	Quase Tudo	Paulo Gonzo	
39/1997	Quase Tudo	Paulo Gonzo	
40/1997	Feijão Com Arroz	Daniela Mercury	
41/1997	Feijão Com Arroz	Daniela Mercury	
42/1997	Quase Tudo	Paulo Gonzo	
43/1997	Quase Tudo	Paulo Gonzo	
44/1997	Romanza	Andrea Bocelli	
45/1997	Romanza	Andrea Bocelli	
46/1997	Romanza	Andrea Bocelli	
47/1997	Romanza	Andrea Bocelli	
48/1997	Romanza	Andrea Bocelli	
49/1997	Romanza	Andrea Bocelli	
50/1997	Romanza	Andrea Bocelli	
51/1997	Romanza	Andrea Bocelli	
52/1997	Feijão Com Arroz	Daniela Mercury	
