= List of number-one singles of 2026 (Portugal) =

The Portuguese Singles Chart ranks the best-performing singles in Portugal, as compiled by the Associação Fonográfica Portuguesa.

Number-one singles of 2026 in Portugal
Week	Song	Artist	Reference
1	"Posso Até Não Te Dar Flores"	DJ Japa NK, MC Meno K, MC Ryan SP and MC Jacaré	
2	"Posso Até Não Te Dar Flores"	DJ Japa NK, MC Meno K, MC Ryan SP and MC Jacaré	
3	"Posso Até Não Te Dar Flores"	DJ Japa NK, MC Meno K, MC Ryan SP and MC Jacaré	
4	"Jetski"	Pedro Sampaio, MC Meno K and Melody	
5	"Jetski"	Pedro Sampaio, MC Meno K and Melody	
6	"Jetski"	Pedro Sampaio, MC Meno K and Melody	
7	"DTMF"	Bad Bunny	
8	"Jetski"	Pedro Sampaio, MC Meno K and Melody	
9	"Jetski"	Pedro Sampaio, MC Meno K and Melody	
10	"Jetski"	Pedro Sampaio, MC Meno K and Melody	
11	"Jetski"	Pedro Sampaio, MC Meno K and Melody	
12	"Jetski"	Pedro Sampaio, MC Meno K and Melody	
13	"Jetski"	Pedro Sampaio, MC Meno K and Melody	
14	"Jetski"	Pedro Sampaio, MC Meno K and Melody	
15	"Jetski"	Pedro Sampaio, MC Meno K and Melody	
16	"25 de Abril"	Lon3r Johny featuring Plutónio	
17	"25 de Abril"	Lon3r Johny featuring Plutónio	
18	"25 de Abril"	Lon3r Johny featuring Plutónio	
19	"25 de Abril"	Lon3r Johny featuring Plutónio	
20	"25 de Abril"	Lon3r Johny featuring Plutónio	
21	"25 de Abril"	Lon3r Johny featuring Plutónio	
22	"Baile Inolvidable"	Bad Bunny	
23	"Baile Inolvidable"	Bad Bunny	
24	"Sou Grande no Amor"	Chico da Tina	
25	"Sou Grande no Amor"	Chico da Tina	
26	"Sou Grande no Amor"	Chico da Tina	
27	"Dai Dai"	Shakira and Burna Boy	
28	"Dai Dai"	Shakira and Burna Boy	
29	"Dai Dai"	Shakira and Burna Boy	
30	"Dai Dai"	Shakira and Burna Boy	
31	"Dai Dai"	Shakira and Burna Boy	
32	"Dai Dai"	Shakira and Burna Boy	
33	"Dai Dai"	Shakira and Burna Boy	
34	"Dai Dai"	Shakira and Burna Boy	
35	"Dai Dai"	Shakira and Burna Boy	
36	"Pega ou Larga"	Chico da Tina	
37	"Pega ou Larga"	Chico da Tina	
38	"Pega ou Larga"	Chico da Tina	
39	"Pega ou Larga"	Chico da Tina	
40	"25 de Abril"	Lon3r Johny featuring Plutónio	
41	"Isaltino"	Plutónio	
42	"Isaltino"	Plutónio	
43	"Isaltino"	Plutónio	
44	"Isaltino"	Plutónio	
45	"Isaltino"	Plutónio	
46	"CR7"	Plutónio	

== See also ==
- List of number-one albums of 2026 (Portugal)
