= List of number-one albums of 1995 (Portugal) =

The Portuguese Albums Chart ranks the best-performing albums in Portugal, as compiled by the Associação Fonográfica Portuguesa.

Number-one albums in Portugal
← 1994 • 1995 • 1996 →

Week	Album	Artist	Reference
1/1995	Cross Road	Bon Jovi	
2/1995	Cross Road	Bon Jovi	
3/1995	Nº1	Various	
4/1995	MTV Unplugged in New York	Nirvana	
5/1995	Laura Pausini	Laura Pausini	
6/1995	Laura Pausini	Laura Pausini	
7/1995	Laura Pausini	Laura Pausini	
8/1995	Laura Pausini	Laura Pausini	
9/1995	Laura Pausini	Laura Pausini	
10/1995	Laura Pausini	Laura Pausini	
11/1995	Laura Pausini	Laura Pausini	
12/1995	Greatest Hits	Bruce Springsteen	
13/1995	Ainda	Madredeus	
14/1995	Ainda	Madredeus	
15/1995	Ainda	Madredeus	
16/1995	Ainda	Madredeus	
17/1995	1492: Conquest of Paradise	Vangelis	
18/1995	1492: Conquest of Paradise	Vangelis	
19/1995	1492: Conquest of Paradise	Vangelis	
20/1995	1492: Conquest of Paradise	Vangelis	
21/1995	1492: Conquest of Paradise	Vangelis	
22/1995	1492: Conquest of Paradise	Vangelis	
23/1995	Dance Mania '95	Various	
24/1995	Dance Mania '95	Various	
25/1995	Pulse	Pink Floyd	
26/1995	Pulse	Pink Floyd	
27/1995	Pulse	Pink Floyd	
28/1995	These Days	Bon Jovi	
29/1995	These Days	Bon Jovi	
30/1995	These Days	Bon Jovi	
31/1995	Número 1	Various	
32/1995	Número 1	Various	
33/1995	Número 1	Various	
34/1995	Número 1	Various	
35/1995	Dance Music	Iran Costa	
36/1995	Dance Music	Iran Costa	
37/1995	Dance Music	Iran Costa	
38/1995	Dance Music	Iran Costa	
39/1995	Dance Music	Iran Costa	
40/1995	Dance Music	Iran Costa	
41/1995	Dance Music	Iran Costa	
42/1995	Dance Music	Iran Costa	
43/1995	Daydream	Mariah Carey	
44/1995	Daydream	Mariah Carey	
45/1995	Life	Simply Red	
46/1995	Don't Bore Us, Get to the Chorus!	Roxette	
47/1995	Don't Bore Us, Get to the Chorus!	Roxette	
48/1995	Made In Heaven	Queen	
49/1995	Made In Heaven	Queen	
50/1995	Made In Heaven	Queen	
51/1995	Made In Heaven	Queen	
52/1995	Made In Heaven	Queen	
