= List of number-one singles of 1992 (Portugal) =

The Portuguese Singles Chart ranks the best-performing singles in Portugal, as compiled by the Associação Fonográfica Portuguesa.

Number-one singles in Portugal
← 1991 • 1992 • 1993 →

| Week | Song | Artist | Reference |
|---|---|---|---|
| 1/1992 | | | |
| 2/1992 | "(Everything I Do) I Do It for You" | Bryan Adams | |
| 3/1992 | "Taras e Manias" | Marco Paulo | |
| 4/1992 | "Don't Cry" | Guns N' Roses | |
| 5/1992 | "Don't Cry" | Guns N' Roses | |
| 6/1992 | "Don't Cry" | Guns N' Roses | |
| 7/1992 | "Mysterious Ways" | U2 | |
| 8/1992 | "Taras e Manias" | Marco Paulo | |
| 9/1992 | "Don't Cry" | Guns N' Roses | |
| 10/1992 | "Don't Cry" | Guns N' Roses | |
| 11/1992 | "Don't Cry" | Guns N' Roses | |
| 12/1992 | "Don't Cry" | Guns N' Roses | |
| 13/1992 | "Don't Cry" | Guns N' Roses | |
| 14/1992 | "Don't Let the Sun Go Down on Me" | George Michael and Elton John | |
| 15/1992 | "Don't Let the Sun Go Down on Me" | George Michael and Elton John | |
| 16/1992 | "Don't Let the Sun Go Down on Me" | George Michael and Elton John | |
| 17/1992 | "Don't Let the Sun Go Down on Me" | George Michael and Elton John | |
| 18/1992 | "Don't Let the Sun Go Down on Me" | George Michael and Elton John | |
| 19/1992 | "Don't Let the Sun Go Down on Me" | George Michael and Elton John | |
| 20/1992 | "Don't Let the Sun Go Down on Me" | George Michael and Elton John | |
| 21/1992 | "Don't Let the Sun Go Down on Me" | George Michael and Elton John | |
| 22/1992 | "Don't Let the Sun Go Down on Me" | George Michael and Elton John | |
| 23/1992 | "Don't Let the Sun Go Down on Me" | George Michael and Elton John | |
| 24/1992 | "Let's Talk About Sex" | Salt-n-Pepa | |
| 25/1992 | "Don't Let the Sun Go Down on Me" | George Michael and Elton John | |
| 26/1992 | "Maubere" | Rui Veloso | |
| 27/1992 | "Maubere" | Rui Veloso | |
| 28/1992 | "Maubere" | Rui Veloso | |
| 29/1992 | "Maubere" | Rui Veloso | |
| 30/1992 | "Don't Let the Sun Go Down on Me" | George Michael and Elton John | |
| 31/1992 | "Maubere" | Rui Veloso | |
| 32/1992 | "Don't Let the Sun Go Down on Me" | George Michael and Elton John | |
| 33/1992 | "Maubere" | Rui Veloso | |
| 34/1992 | "Maubere" | Rui Veloso | |
| 35/1992 | "Maubere" | Rui Veloso | |
| 36/1992 | "Knockin' on Heaven's Door" | Guns N' Roses | |
| 37/1992 | "Maubere" | Rui Veloso | |
| 38/1992 | "Maubere" | Rui Veloso | |
| 39/1992 | "Maubere" | Rui Veloso | |
| 40/1992 | "Maubere" | Rui Veloso | |
| 41/1992 | "Maubere" | Rui Veloso | |
| 42/1992 | "Don't Let the Sun Go Down on Me" | George Michael and Elton John | |
| 43/1992 | "Maubere" | Rui Veloso | |
| 44/1992 | "Maubere" | Rui Veloso | |
| 45/1992 | "Don't Let the Sun Go Down on Me" | George Michael and Elton John | |
| 46/1992 | "Maubere" | Rui Veloso | |
| 47/1992 | "Maubere" | Rui Veloso | |
| 48/1992 | "Don't Let the Sun Go Down on Me" | George Michael and Elton John | |
| 49/1992 | "Chuva Dissolvente" | Xutos & Pontapés | |
| 50/1992 | "Don't Let the Sun Go Down on Me" | George Michael and Elton John | |
| 51/1992 | "Chuva Dissolvente" | Xutos & Pontapés | |
| 52/1992 | | | |

== See also ==
- List of number-one albums of 1992 (Portugal)
