= List of number-one albums of 2024 (Portugal) =

The Portuguese Albums Chart ranks the best-performing albums in Portugal, as compiled by the Associação Fonográfica Portuguesa.

Number-one albums in Portugal
← 2023 • 2024

Number-one albums of 2024 in Portugal
Week	Album	Artist	Reference
1	1989 (Taylor's Version)	Taylor Swift	
2	1989 (Taylor's Version)	Taylor Swift	
3	1989 (Taylor's Version)	Taylor Swift	
4	Afro Fado	Slow J	
5	Afro Fado	Slow J	
6	Afro Fado	Slow J	
7	Vultures 1	¥$: Kanye West and Ty Dolla Sign	
8	O Próprio	Dillaz	
9	O Próprio	Dillaz	
10	O Próprio	Dillaz	
11	Eternal Sunshine	Ariana Grande	
12	O Próprio	Dillaz	
13	O Próprio	Dillaz	
14	Cowboy Carter	Beyoncé	
15	O Próprio	Dillaz	
16	O Próprio	Dillaz	
17	The Tortured Poets Department	Taylor Swift	
18	The Tortured Poets Department	Taylor Swift	
19	Radical Optimism	Dua Lipa	
20	The Tortured Poets Department	Taylor Swift	
21	Hit Me Hard and Soft	Billie Eilish	
22	Hit Me Hard and Soft	Billie Eilish	
23	Hit Me Hard and Soft	Billie Eilish	
24	Hit Me Hard and Soft	Billie Eilish	
25	Hit Me Hard and Soft	Billie Eilish	
26	Hit Me Hard and Soft	Billie Eilish	
27	Hit Me Hard and Soft	Billie Eilish	
28	Hit Me Hard and Soft	Billie Eilish	
29	Hit Me Hard and Soft	Billie Eilish	
30	Ate	Stray Kids	
31	Hit Me Hard and Soft	Billie Eilish	
32	Hit Me Hard and Soft	Billie Eilish	
33	Ate	Stray Kids	
34	Hit Me Hard and Soft	Billie Eilish	
35	Short n' Sweet	Sabrina Carpenter	
36	Short n' Sweet	Sabrina Carpenter	
37	Luck and Strange	David Gilmour	
38	333	Matuê	
39	333	Matuê	
40	Short n' Sweet	Sabrina Carpenter	
41	Moon Music	Coldplay	
42	Short n' Sweet	Sabrina Carpenter	
43	Short n' Sweet	Sabrina Carpenter	
44	Chromakopia	Tyler, the Creator	
45	Songs of a Lost World	The Cure	
46	Carta de Alforria	Plutónio	
47	From Zero	Linkin Park	
48	Carta de Alforria	Plutónio	
49	Carta de Alforria	Plutónio	
50	The Tortured Poets Department	Taylor Swift	
51	Hop	Stray Kids	
52	Carta de Alforria	Plutónio	

== See also ==
- List of number-one singles of 2024 (Portugal)
