= David Carreira =

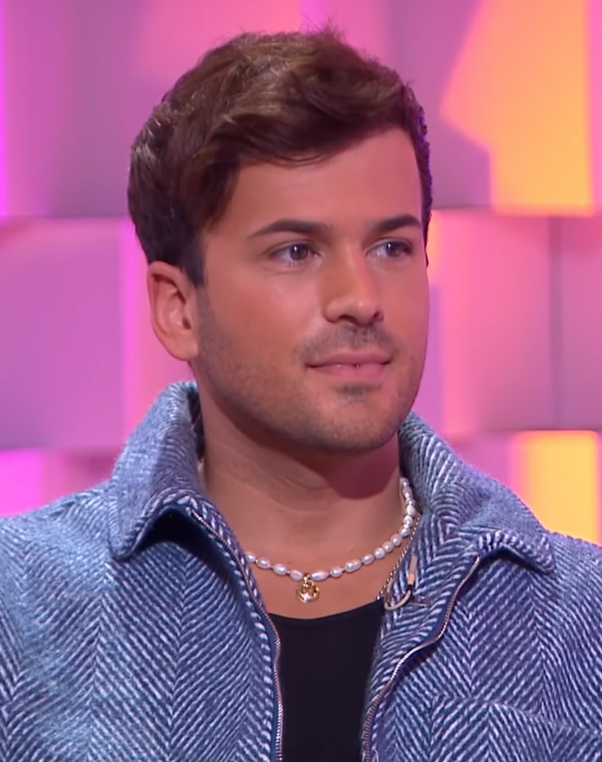
- Carreira in 2024

Background information
- Born: David Araújo Antunes; 30 July 1991 (age 34); Dourdan, France
- Origin: Portugal
- Genres: Pop; dance; Hip hop; R&B
- Years active: 2008–present
- Label: Farol Música
- Website: www.davidcarreira.com.pt

David Araújo Antunes (born 30 July 1991), better known by his artistic name David Carreira, is a Portuguese singer, actor and model. His debut album N.1 (2011) reached number 1 in the Portuguese charts and follow-up A força está em nós to number 2 in Portugal. Singing in Portuguese, English and French, he has developed an international career and is particularly known in French markets as well with a number of successful singles including "Obrigado la famille" and "Boom".

== Early life ==
=== Sports ===
Growing up after his family moved back to Portugal, he joined the junior formative team of Frossos football club in 2001, but suffering a knee injury, he was forced to quit a possible pro sports career.

=== Arts and fashion ===
Instead of sports, Carreira concentrated more on an artistic career in music and fashion, particularly since he comes from a very artistic family. By this time, his father Tony Carreira was a famous singer who was well known by the Portuguese public and his mother Fernanda Antunes was his father's manager. His sister Sara Antunes was already a public celebrity and his older brother Mickael Carreira was having a singing career since 2007.

David Carreira's first venture was as a model, parading events such for "ModaLisboa" and "Portugal Fashion". He was featured in a number of advertising campaigns, notably for Cacharel.

== Career ==
=== Acting career ===
David Carreira participated in 2010 in the eighth season of Morangos com Açúcar from TVI in the role of "Lourenço Seixas".

In 2012, he also appeared in the telenovela series Louco Amor also on TVI in the role of Chico, a 21-year-old who dates and hooks up with older women.

=== Music career ===
In October 2011, he released his debut album N.1 produced by the French production duo Tefa et Blasta which presented him as a young pop act appealing to massive audiences with a mix of pop, dance, hip hop and R&B. The album was a huge success staying 43 consecutive weeks in the Portuguese Albums Chart and peaking at number 1. The album was certified double platinum. The single "Esta noite" from the album became a major hit. David Carreira went on a big tour culminating in a concert at the Coliseu dos Recreios on 16 February 2013.

On 11 November 2013, he released his follow-up album A força está em nós with the collaborations from Snoop Dogg, Bxsoss AC, Anselmo Ralph, Diana Chaves and the French singer Léa Castel. The albon the Portuguese Album Charts.

Simultaneously with his Portuguese career, Carreira developed an international career, starting with the French-language market through a deal with Warner France. His debut single in France was "Obrigado la famille", a duo with French rapper Dry. The single was produced by Wati B who has produced major French hip hop acts like Sexion d'Assaut, Maître Gims and The Shin Sekaï.

The single was an initial release from the forthcoming French-language album in 2014 on Warner Music France. The album featured a number of collaborations including rapper Dry, and singers Tal and Tunisiano. A second single called "Boom" was released, and was promoted by David Carreira performing it live on the French talk and variety program Vivement Dimanche hosted by Michel Drucker and during a special sequence where the guest was David's father Tony Carreira.

== Personal life ==
Born in France, Carreira never had French citizenship and was a Portuguese citizen. His father, Tony Carreira, and brother, Mickael Carreira, are also pop singers. His mother is the manager of his father's music career. Carreira also had one younger sister who died, Sara, who was also a singer.

== Discography ==
=== Studio albums ===
| Title | Details | Peak positions | | | |
| Title | Details | POR | FRA | BEL (Wa) | SWI |
|---|---|---|---|---|---|
| N.1 | Release date: 17 October 2011; Label: Farol Música; Format: CD, download digital; Certification: POR: 2× Platinum | 1 | — | — | — |
| A força está em nós | Release date: 2013; Label: Farol Música; Format: CD, download digital; Certification: POR: Platinum | 2 | — | — | — |
| Tout recommencer | Release date: 2014; Label: Warner Music France; Format: CD, download digital; Certification: | — | 8 | 20 | 21 |
| 3 | Release date: 4 December 2015; Label: Regi Concerto; Format: CD, digital download | 1 | — | — | — |
| 1991 | Release date: 19 May 2017; Record label: Warner, Regi Concerto; Format: CD, digital download | 14 | 54 | — | 58 |
| 7 | Release date: 2018; Label: Sony, Regi Concerto; Format: CD, digital download | 1 | — | — | — |
| Oyto | Release date: 2023; Label: Sony, Regi Concerto; Format: CD, digital download | 1 | — | — | — |

=== Live albums ===
| Title | Details | Peak positions |
| Title | Details | POR |
|---|---|---|
| 360° Live campo pequeno | Release date: 18 November 2016; Record label: Sony; Format: CD, digital download | 3 |

=== EPs ===
| Title | Details |
|---|---|
| David Carreira – EP24 | Release date: 7 July 2014; Record label: Warner Music; Format: Digital download |

=== Singles ===
| Year | Title | Peak positions | | | Album |
| Year | Title | POR | FRA | BEL (Wa) | Album |
|---|---|---|---|---|---|
| 2011 | "Esta Noite" (featuring Jmi Sissoko) | 5 | — | — | N.1 |
| 2013 | "Obrigado la famille" (featuring Dry) | — | 55 | 3* (Ultratip) | Non-album release |
| 2014 | "Boom" | — | 50 | 3* (Ultratip) | A força está em nós |
| 2014 | "Viser le K.O." (featuring Snoop Dogg) | — | 167 | 4* (Ultratip) | Tout recommencer |
| 2017 | "Domino" | — | 177 | — | 1991 |

*Did not appear in the official Belgian Ultratop 50 charts, but rather in the bubbling under Ultratip charts.

Others

- 2011: "Tu"
- 2011: "Esta Noite"
- 2012: "Falling Into You"
- 2012: "Don't Stop the Party / Esta Noite" (remix) (featuring Lara Life & Jmi Sissoko)
- 2013: "Baby Fica" (featuring Anselmo Ralph)
- 2014: "Boom" (feat. Leck)
- 2014: "Haverá Sempre Uma Música"
  - 2015: "Haverá Sempre Uma Música" (Trackstorm Remix)
- 2014: "ABC" (with Boss AC)
- 2015: "Falling for U Girl" (Diana Chaves)
- 2015: "Rien à envier"
- 2015: "Primeira Dama"
- 2017: "Lucia"
- 2017: "Ficamos por aqui"
- 2018: "És só tu" (feat. Inês Herédia)
- 2018: "O problema é que ela é Linda" (feat. Deejay Télio, Mc Zuka)
- 2018: "Cuido de você" (with Kell Smith)
- 2018: "Gosto de ti" (feat. Sara Carreira)

The 3 Project

- 2016: "Intro" (part 1)
- 2016: "Señorita" (feat. Mickael Carreira) (part 2)
- 2016: "Dizias que não" (part 3)
- 2016: "Dama do business" (feat. Plutónio) (part 4)
- 2016: "Primeira Dama" (part 5)
- 2016: "Transição" (part 6)
- 2016: "In Love" (feat. Ana Free) (part 7)
- 2016: "Não fui eu" (part 8)

Featured in

- 2015: "Piqué" (Sultan feat. David Carreira)
