= Adriana Calcanhotto =

Brazilian singer and composer (born 1965)

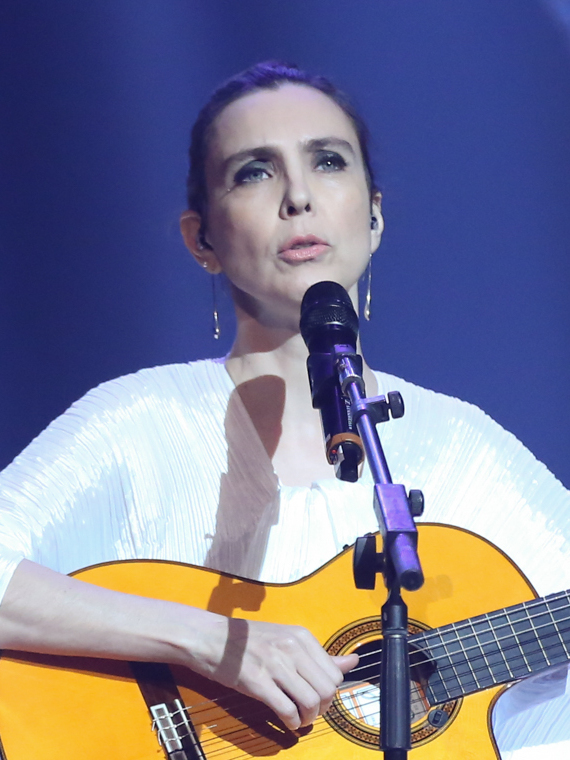
- Calcanhotto in 2015

Background information
- Born: Adriana da Cunha Calcanhotto; 3 October 1965 (age 61); Porto Alegre, Rio Grande do Sul, Brazil
- Genres: MPB; pop; samba
- Occupations: Singer; songwriter; poet; author
- Instruments: Vocals; guitar
- Years active: 1984–present
- Website: adrianacalcanhotto.com

Adriana da Cunha Calcanhotto (born 3 October 1965) is a Brazilian singer-songwriter. Her melancholic songs are often categorized in the MPB genre. She began her professional career in 1984 and released her first studio album in 1990. She is also a teacher and ambassador of the University of Coimbra in Portugal.

== Career ==
=== Childhood and family ===
Born from musician Carlos Calcanhotto (originally Calcagnotto) of Italian origin from Volpago del Montello, Veneto, and from a Brazilian dancer.

=== The first records (1988-1997) ===
Adriana's first album, called Enguiço, was released in 1990 and consisted mostly of covers of well known MPB (Brazilian pop) songs, part of the repertoire she used to perform as a singer in restaurants and bars in Porto Alegre. It included only one original composition, the title track. It spawned her first hit, a cover of Caetano Veloso's Naquela Estação, which became successful thanks to it being included in the soundtrack of the successful 1990 telenovela Rainha da Sucata.

1992 saw the release of Senhas, which included the hits "Mentiras" and "Esquadros" and was followed by a successful national tour. In 1994, Adriana, sporting a new look (short black hair as opposed to the slightly longer bright blond haircut she'd had since the beginning of her career) released A Fábrica do Poema, considered by many to be her most poetic album. She collaborated with lyricists like Waly Salomão and António Cícero (brother and constant musical partner of fellow singer Marina Lima) and included the hits "Metade" and "Inverno". This was followed by Maritmo (a combination of the words marítimo (maritime) and ritmo (rhythm), a concept album intended as the first part of a trilogy having water as a main theme.

=== Height of success (1998-2003) ===
At the turn of the millennium, Adriana experienced the peak of her career with the release of the album Público in 2000. Her first live album/DVD, Público was recorded in a voz-e-violão (voice and guitar) style, meaning there was no band, only the singer playing her acoustic guitar, an instrument which has followed her through her entire career. The album included a cover of the staple torch song Devolva-me, made famous by the duo Leno & Lílian back in the 1960s. This album was followed by her first greatest hits compilation, Perfil (the success of this album prompted her record company to make it a series, releasing compilations of the same title by such artists as Cássia Eller, Zélia Duncan and Djavan). Another album of new material wouldn't be released until 2002, when the singer released "Cantada". In the meantime, Adriana toured Europe and Japan (as she has done many times since).

=== Adriana Partimpim and Book (2004-2010) ===
After the release of that album, Adriana took on the persona of Adriana Partimpim, an alias the singer claims to have used as a child. Adriana Partimpim released her self-titled "debut" in 2004, an album of covers featuring essentially traditional children's songs, but which also included familiar pop songs made to resemble children's songs. Examples of such songs are the covers of Paula Toller's Oito Anos (a song Toller wrote for her own son, Gabriel) and Claudinho & Buchecha's Fico Assim Sem Você, which became a hit on adult radios. A live CD/DVD combo of the show was also released the following year. The album has Latin Grammy Award for Best Children's Album.

Maré, was released in early 2008 and features a guest appearance by the singer's personal friend, Marisa Monte as well as a cover of Marina Lima's song Três. She toured Brazil to promote the record, as well as once again touring Europe, Japan and the United States. Adriana has chronicled her adventures on tour in the book Saga Lusa (Portuguese Saga), in which she shares her memoirs of the Portuguese leg of her most recent tour. The book was released on October 28 in Rio de Janeiro.

On October 23, 2009, Adriana performed in front of an adoring crowd at the Canadian Museum of Civilization in Gatineau, Quebec, Canada in a free performance presented by the Embassy of Brazil.

=== Successful Tours ===
Since 2015, Calcanhotto had joined Universidade de Coimbra as a university ambassador, acting as visiting lecturer on song composition courses and as an artist-in-residence.

=== Alone and Wandering ===
Her album Errante was chosen by the Associação Paulista de Críticos de Arte as one of the 50 best Brazilian albums of 2023.

== Personal life ==
From 2021 to 2022, she dated actress Maitê Proença.

== Discography ==
=== Albums ===
Title	Details	Sales	Certification
Enguiço	Released: 1990; Label: CBS/Columbia Records; Format: LP, CD	BRA: 100,000	ABPD: Gold
Senhas	Released: 1992; Label: CBS/Columbia Records; Format: LP, CD	BRA: 150,000	ABPD: Gold
A Fábrica do Poema	Released: 1994; Label: Sony Music/Epic; Format: LP, CD	BRA: 150,000	ABPD: Gold
Maritmo	Released: 1998; Label: Sony Music; Format: CD	BRA: 150,000	ABPD: Gold
Público	Released: 2000; Label: BMG; Format: CD	BRA: 600,000	ABPD: 2× Platinum
Perfil – Adriana Calcanhotto	Released: 2001; Label: Som Livre; Format: CD	BRA: 500,000	ABPD: 2× Platinum
Cantada	Released: 2002; Label: BMG; Format: CD	BRA: 250,000	ABPD: Platinum
Adriana Partimpim	Released: 2004; Label: Sony BMG; Format: CD, download digital	BRA: 200,000	ABPD: Platinum
Adriana Partimpim – O Show	Released: 2005; Label: BMG; Format: CD, download digital	BRA: 200,000	ABPD: Platinum
Maré	Released: 2008; Label: Sony/BMG; Format: CD, download digital	BRA: 40,000	ABPD: Gold
Partimpim Dois	Released: 2009; Label: Sony Music; Format: CD, download digital	BRA: 65,000	ABPD: Gold
Seleção Essencial	Released: 2010; Label: Sony Music; Format: CD, download digital	BRA: 70,000	ABPD: Gold
O Micróbio do Samba	Released: 2011; Label: Sony Music; Format: CD, download digital	BRA: 25,000	
Multishow ao Vivo: Micróbio Vivo	Released: 2012; Label: Sony Music; Format: CD, download digital	BRA: 5,000	
Partimpim Tlês	Released: 2012; Label: Sony Music; Format: CD, download digital	BRA: 25,000	
Olhos de Onda	Released: 2014; Label: Sony Music; Format: CD, download digital	BRA: 35,000	
Loucura	Released: 2015; Label: Sony Music; Format: CD, download digital	BRA: 20,000	
