= Adriana Partimpim =

Studio album by Adriana Calcanhotto
- Released: 2004
- Recorded: 2004
- Genre: Música popular brasileira
- Labels: BMG, Ariola
- Producers: Adriana Calcanhotto, Dé Palmeira

Adriana Calcanhotto chronology
Cantada (2002)	Adriana Partimpim (2004)	Maré (2008)

Professional ratings
Review scores
Source	Rating
Allmusic	3.5/5 stars

Adriana Partimpim is an album by the Brazilian singer and songwriter Adriana Calcanhotto. Partimpim is a nickname of Calcanhotto in her childhood. This was Calcanhotto's first album for children.

== Track listing ==
1. "Lição de Baião" (03:16)
2. "Oito Anos" (03:08)
3. "Lig-Lig-Lig-Lé" (02:38)
4. "Fico Assim Sem Você" (03:08)
5. "Canção da Falsa Tartaruga" (04:07)
6. "Formiga Bossa Nova" (02:28)
7. "Ciranda da Bailarina" (04:49)
8. "Ser de Sagitário" (03:03)
9. "Borboleta" (02:30)
10. "Saiba" (03:01)
