= Associação Fonográfica Portuguesa =

Portuguese recording industry association

- Formation: 1989
- Location: Portugal
- Official language: Portuguese

The Associação Fonográfica Portuguesa (AFP; English: Portuguese Phonographic Association) is the recording industry association of the major labels in Portugal. Created in 1989, it succeeded GPPFV (Portuguese group of producers of phonograms and videograms) and UNEVA (Union of audio and video editors).

The AFP is the Portuguese group of the International Federation of the Phonographic Industry (IFPI). The AFP gathers the main record publishers that operate in the Portuguese market and its affiliates represent more than 95% of the market.

In January 1994, AFP suspended the Portuguese singles chart but continued to publish the Portuguese albums chart. The singles chart was not resumed until July 2000.

== Record charts ==
=== Current charts ===
Chart title	Chart type	Number of positions	Notes
Top Albums	sales + streaming	200	Up until 2021, the main album chart only accounted for physical sales. Digital sales were included in 2021. Streaming was included in 2024.; The charted started in 1990 with 10 positions, expanding to 30 in 2003, 50 in 2016 and to 200 in 2024.
Top Singles	sales + streaming	200	From 1990 to 1994, AFP released the top 10 best-selling physical singles, until it got discontinued. The chart was revived in July 2000 with a top 10 weekly chart being released until 2 March 2004.; The chart was once again revived in 2016, expanding to 100 positions and including both sales and streaming.; In 2020, the chart was expanded to 200 positions. In 2024, although it is titled as a 10,000 positions chart, only 200 are posted to the public.
Top Airplay	airplay	100	The chart was first published in 2020 as a year-end chart. From 2021 onwards, AFP-Audiogest started releasing weekly charts.
Top Singles Streaming	streaming	200	The chart was first published as a year-end chart in 2017.; The weekly chart started being published in 2018 with 100 positions, and was expanded to 200 positions in 2020. In 2024, although it is titled as a 10,000 positions chart, only 200 are posted to the public.
Top Albums Streaming	streaming	200	The chart was first published in 2024 with 200 positions.

=== Discontinued charts ===
Chart title	Chart type	Number of positions	Notes
Top Compilations	physical sales	10	The chart was first published in 2003 and, throughout its run, it was always a top 10 chart.; From 2013 to 2017, the chart was not publicly available, as both AFP's and Artistas & Espetáculos' websites went down permanently.; The chart started being weekly released to the public again in 2018 and was discontinued in 2024.
Top DVDs	physical sales	10	The chart was first published in 2004 and was discontinued in 2019. The year-end DVDs chart, however, has also been published in 2020 and 2022.; From 2013 to 2017, the chart was not publicly available, as both AFP's and Artistas & Espetáculos' websites went down permanently.; The chart started with 30 positions, but was reduced to 10 by 2018.
Top Ringtones	ringtones	30	The chart was publicly published from 2007 to 2013.; It is unknown when the chart stopped being published, as both AFP's and Artistas & Espetáculos' websites were down by the end of 2013. When AFP-Audiogest started updating the charts on their website in 2018, the chart no longer existed.
Top Digital Albums	digital downloads	—	In 2017, 2018, and 2019, the year-end chart for the best-selling digital albums was released by AFP-Audiogest.; It is currently unknown if there was ever a weekly version of the chart, as the charts were not made public from 2013 to 2017.
Top Full Track Download	digital downloads	—	In 2017 and 2018, the year-end chart for the best-selling digital songs was released by AFP-Audiogest.; It is currently unknown if there was ever a weekly version of the chart, as the charts were not made public from 2013 to 2017.

=== Charts lists ===
List of number-one albums per year
1990–1999	1990	1991	1992	1993	1994	1995	1996	1997	1998	1999
2000–2009	2000	2001	2002	2003	2004	2005	2006	2007	2008	2009
2010–2019	2010	2011	2012	2013	2014	2015	2016	2017	2018	2019
2020–present	2020	2021	2022	2023	2024	2025	2026			

List of number-one singles per year
1990–1999	1990	1991	1992	1993	1994	—	—	—	—	—
2010–2019	—	—	—	—	—	—	2016	2017	2018	2019
2020–present	2020	2021	2022	2023	2024	2025	2026			

== Sales certifications ==
=== Albums ===
Certification	From 1987 to May 2005	From May 2005 to 2010	From 2011 to 2023	Since 2024
Silver	10,000	—	—	—
Gold	20,000	10,000	7,500	3,500
Platinum	40,000	20,000	15,000	7,000
Diamond	—	—	—	70,000

=== Singles ===
Certification	From 2011 to 2015	From 2016 to 2023	From 2024 to week 26 of 2025	Since week 27 of 2025
Gold	10,000	5,000	5,000	12,000
Platinum	20,000	10,000	10,000	25,000
Diamond	—	—	100,000	250,000

=== Music DVDs ===
Certification	Since 2008
Gold	4,000
Platinum	8,000

== Top+ ==
The television program Top+, broadcast by RTP1 on every Saturday afternoon, was a weekly charts program done in partnership with the AFP. It aired between 1990 and 2012. At the time of cancellation, it was the longest-running television program in Portugal with the exception of RTP1's evening news programme Telejornal.
