= Farol Música =

Portuguese record company

Farol Música is a Portuguese record label in Queluz de Baixo, in the municipality of Oeiras, near Lisbon .

It has released new bands (such as D'ZRT) of Morangos com Açúcar and famous Portuguese bands and singers (José Cid, Marco Paulo, Rita Guerra, etc.). They promote portuguese artists in digital platforms. Part of its capital is owned by the Spanish media capital Prisa.
