= D'ZRT =

Portuguese boy band

D'ZRT was a Portuguese boy band consisting of Paulo Vintém, Angélico Vieira, Vítor Fonseca and Edmundo Vieira. The band was created when Portuguese television channel TVI cast a band for their series Morangos com Açucar. The four members portrayed Topê, David, Zé Milho and Ruca. Ruca already had musical experience as a contestant on Operação Triunfo. Paulo Vintém was also on the same show, but was eliminated early on.

Their self-titled first album was released in 2005 and was number-one in the Portuguese record chart for 21 weeks. In 2006, their second album, Original was released. After leaving Morangos com Açucar, their song "Verão Azul" was used in the third summer series. Their final album was Project, released in 2009.

== Discography ==
=== Studio albums ===
Year	Album	Chart positions
Year	Album	POR
2005	D'zrt: First full studio album; Released:2005	1
2006	Original: Second full studio album; Released:2006	1
2009	Project: Third full studio album; Released:2009	1

=== Singles ===
Year	Title	Chart Positions			Album
Year	Title	POR	BRA	EUR	Album
2005	"Para mim tanto me faz"	1	1	125	D'ZRT
2006	"Verão Azul"	1	1	125	Original
2009	"Feeling"	1	1	265	Project

=== DVD ===
- DZRT - Ao Vivo no coliseu dos Recreios (2006) #1 in Portugal
- DZRT - The Story (2006)

== Books ==
- DZRT - Passado, Presente e Futuro (2006)
- "DZRT - DZRT Project" (2009)
