= Desfado =

Studio album by Ana Moura
- Released: 12 November 2012
- Recorded: May 2012
- Studios: Henson, Hollywood
- Genres: Fado, jazz
- Length: 61:40
- Labels: Universal; Decca (United States)
- Producer: Larry Klein

Ana Moura chronology
Leva-me aos Fados (2009)	Desfado (2012)	Moura (2015)

Singles from Desfado
- 1. "Até ao Verão" Released: 15 October 2012; 2. "Desfado" Released: 7 January 2013; 3. "A Case of You" Released: 21 January 2013

Desfado is the fifth album by Portuguese fado singer Ana Moura. It was produced by American record producer Larry Klein in Hollywood, California, and was released on 12 November 2012 in Portugal through Universal Music Portugal, and on 13 February 2013 in the United States by Decca Records. Desfado was met with generally positive reviews by music critics, who praised Moura's vocals. The album counted with the participation of Portuguese songwriters Manel Cruz, Márcia Santos, Pedro da Silva Martins, António Zambujo, and Pedro Abrunhosa, among many others, for the composition of the themes. American musicians Herbie Hancock and Tim Ries contributed in the album, the first being featured in the song "Dream of Fire", whilst Ries in "Havemos de Acordar". The album also features uncredited lyrics by Prince.

Three singles were released from Desfado; "Até ao Verão", "Desfado", and "A Case of You", the last a cover version of Joni Mitchell. The album topped the Portuguese Albums Chart and since then it has been certified 6× Platinum by the Associação Fonográfica Portuguesa, becoming the best-selling album of the 2010s in Portugal, by a Portuguese artist. It also appeared in the charts of Belgium, Spain and the United States. A live edition of the album, titled Desfado, ao Vivo no Caixa Alfama, was recorded in September 2013, during the Alfama Fado Festival. This version won the Amália Award for "Best Album". To promote the album further, Moura toured several performances in multiple countries on her Desfado Tour.

== Composition and recording ==
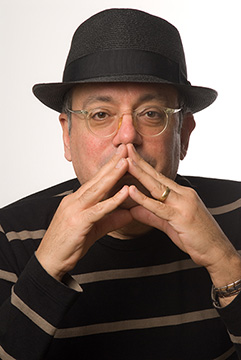
American record producer Larry Klein produced Desfado at Henson Recording Studios.

Unlike her previous albums, which were recorded in Lisbon, Portugal, Desfado was recorded in the United States, at Henson Recording Studios, in Hollywood, California, and it was produced by American record producer Larry Klein. According to Moura, "[e]verything was new [...] [t]he musicians were discovering new things. And I was not used to hearing my voice next to a Fender Rhodes, for example." Portuguese guitarists Ângelo Freire and Pedro Soares contributed with the "fado-alike" sounds, whilst American musicians composed "the most un-fado-like keyboards, saxophone, and drums", as described by Siddhartha Mitter for The Boston Globe. Mitter also described the songwriters to not be "poets who specialize in fado, but by young rock and pop artists, some of whom had not done fado before." And considered the songs to be "wistful, playful, and some are more upbeat than one might expect". About it, Moura said she "wanted to challenge them to write for [her], and to write fado."

For the first time Moura included English language songs into an album, "A Case of You", "Thank You" and "Dream of Fire". Originally, the album did not have such intention, but they wanted to "explore [...] this musical universe". Producer Klein suggested Moura to cover the song "A Case of You" by Joni Mitchell, from Mitchell's 1971 album Blue. Moura commented that she "was very surprised" and she accepted to record it "because [she] love[s] her music". Also Moura considered that "if that song were translated into Portuguese, it could be a very traditional fado lyric." Jim Faber for Daily News considered the inclusion "perfectly fits both the fado's flair for agony and its rich poetry."

American musician Herbie Hancock was featured as the Fender Rhodes pianist for the song "Dream of Fire", which was credited to be written by Moura. According to her, she did not write the song (she wrote the melody), but it was written by a friend of hers "who cannot sign it". In 2018, she revealed that this person was Prince. Hancock's appearance was a "happy coincidence", according to Moura, because she told Klein she was "a fan of Hancock music". Klein was collaborating with Hancock in another project, so he contacted him. Hancock happened to have listened to her previous work, so he accepted to work with her. In "Havemos de Acordar", written by Pedro da Silva Martins (guitarist of Portuguese band Deolinda), American saxophonist Tim Ries plays the soprano saxophone. Da Silva Martins also wrote "Desfado", which Cliff Bellamy from The Herald Sun described as "danceable". A second cover song was included, titled "Thank You", originally performed by David Poe.

== Release and promotion ==
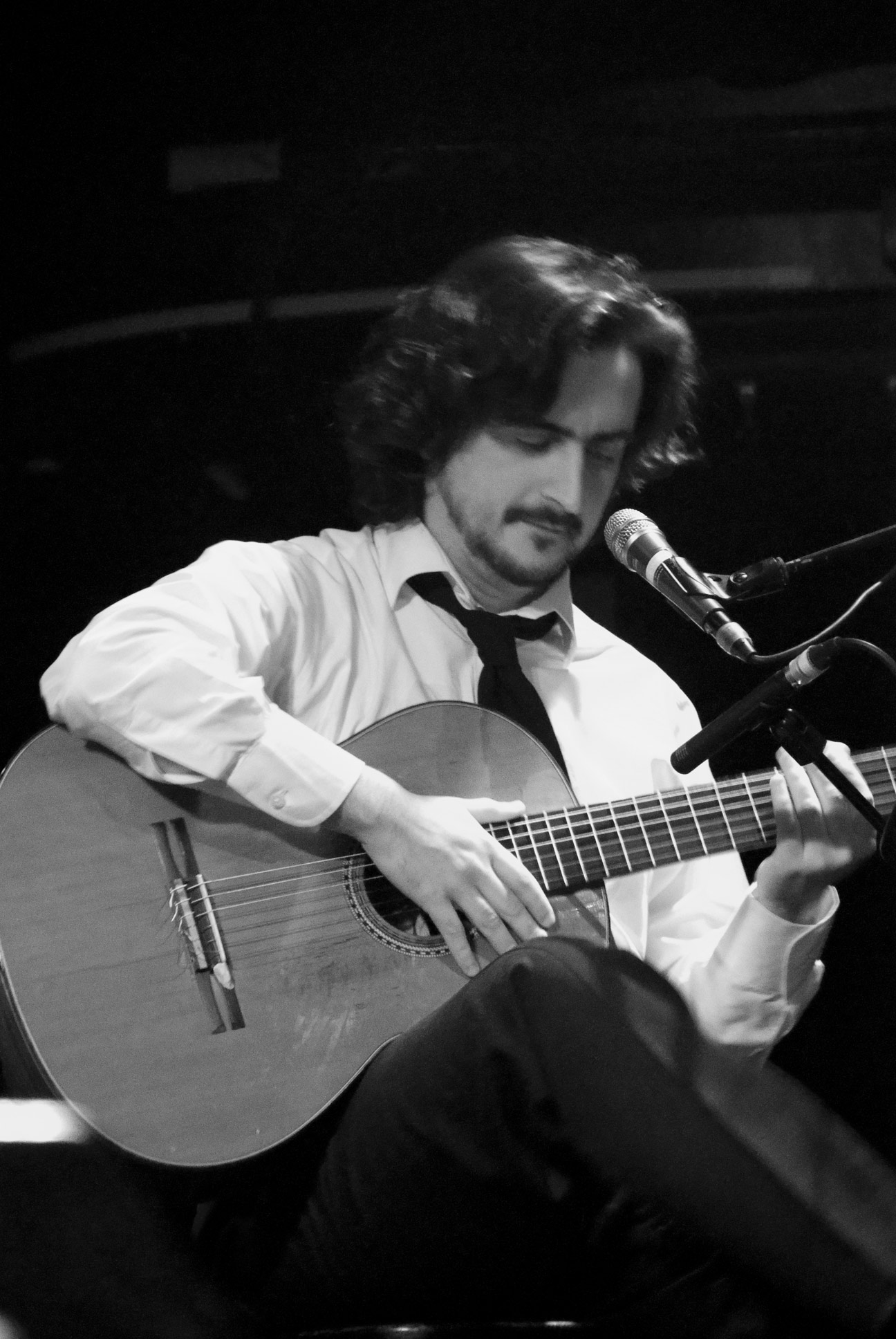
Pedro da Silva Martins wrote "Havemos de Acordar" and "Desfado" for the album, the later received a Portuguese Golden Globe and a Prémio Autores in 2013.

Desfado was released on 12 November 2012 through Universal Music Portugal. Three months later, it was released in the United States on 26 February, through Decca Records, being the first time Decca publishes a Moura album. To promote Desfado, three singles were released and Moura did several performances worldwide through her concert tour Desfado Tour. Also, three different versions of the album were launched, the Standard edition (including 17 songs), the International edition (including 14 songs), and a Deluxe edition, titled Desfado, ao Vivo no Caixa Alfama, featuring live songs recorded in September 2013, during the Alfama Fado Festival.

=== Singles ===
The lead single from Desfado was "Até ao Verão" (English: "Until Summer"), which was released on 15 October 2012. In its music video, Moura walks into a house, she goes to the bedroom, and then she starts to pack her things, including clothes and books, and subsequently leaves the house. Other scenes of Moura singing in front of a wall are intercalated. The second single, the eponymous song "Desfado", was released on 7 January 2013. No official video was released to promote the song. At the 2013 Portuguese Golden Globes it won Best Song; it also won the 2013 Prémio Autores for Best Song.

"A Case of You" was released as the third and last single on 21 January 2013. Its music video, directed by Aurélio Vasques, features a couple (played by Paulo Pires and Ana Rocha). During the first part of the video it is shown the way they live at their home. At some point, she, a painter, decides to paint a wall inside their home. Her boyfriend gives her a wine glass, and then she throws its red content to the wall. Rather than using paintbrushes, she uses her hands to expand it through the wall. Her boyfriend starts reading a book, until he falls asleep. Later, over the red canvas, she starts painting with black paint her boyfriend's face. As she finishes painting it, a flashback appears; in it she walks to the wall with a knife on her hand. It is covered with the same red liquid the wall has painted. The video ends with Rocha's character smiling whilst she cleans-up the knife with her fingers. Throughout the video, scenes featuring Moura whilst she sings in front of a black background were added.

=== Desfado Tour ===
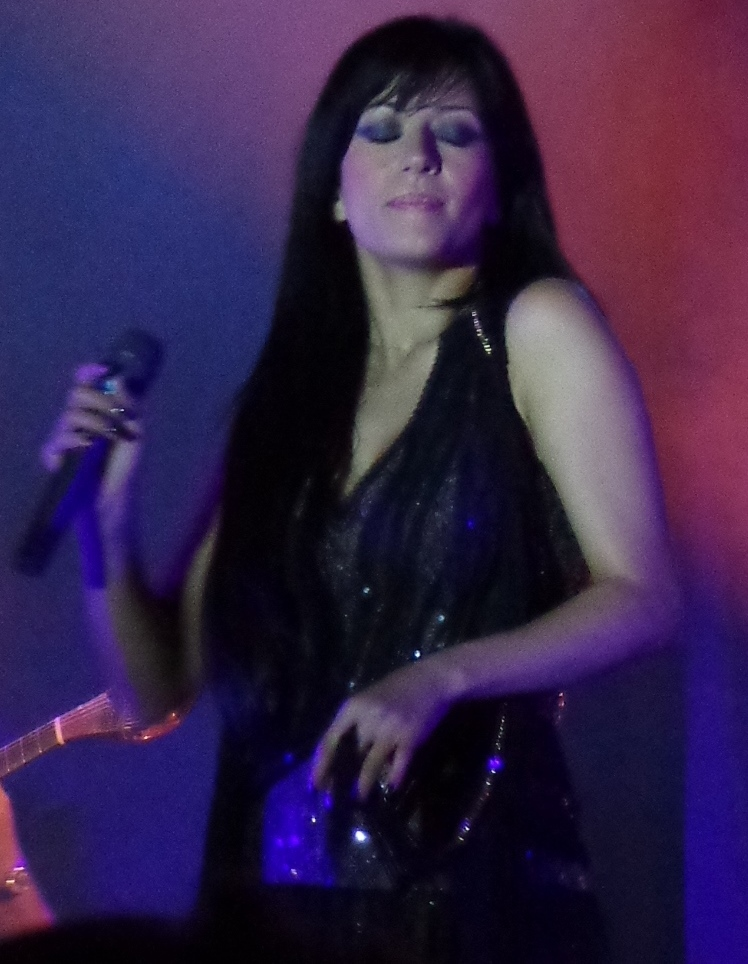
Moura performing in 2013

To promote Desfado, Moura shipped in her concert tour Desfado Tour. With over 300 shows, Moura presented in multiple countries, including Belgium, Canada, Germany, Portugal, Mexico, the Netherlands, Norway, Sweden, Switzerland, and the United States.

== Reception ==
=== Commercial reception ===
Desfado debuted at number 2 on the Portuguese Albums Chart in the week ending 24 November 2012. For 31 weeks the album remained into the top ten until it managed to top the chart in the week ending 15 June 2013. Overall, the album stayed in the first place of sales in Portugal for 6 weeks, and until November 2014 the album had not left the Top 30. The album re-entered the Top 30 multiple times. Since its release, it has been certified 6× Platinum by the Associação Fonográfica Portuguesa, making it the 2010s' best-selling Portuguese album in the country. Also, in Portugal, with 127 weeks in the top 10 and 306 weeks on the entire chart (as of September 2023), it is the all-time best-charting album, and it reached the top 10 in 6 consecutive years, from 2012 to 2017.

Elsewhere, Desfado debuted and peaked at number 198 in the Belgium region Wallonia, whilst in Spain debuted and peaked at number 39 on 24 February 2013. In the United States it reached number 7 on the Top World Albums.

=== Critical response ===
Professional ratings
Review scores
Source	Rating
The Guardian	3/5 stars
Jazz Weekly	Positive
London Evening Standard	4/5 stars
The New York Times	Positive
PopMatters	7/10

Desfado received generally positive reviews by music critics. Robin Denselow wrote for The Guardian that Moura performed in the album "exquisite as ever", but he considered the decision of using additional instruments to her fado trio as a mistake. Denselow noted an exception with the song "Dream of Fire", where he thought Hancock contribution was "fine". In her review for PopMatters, Deanne Sole praised Moura's voice, saying it makes the album "good, [because of her] strong unwavering contralto, excellent on the sad-hopeful tone". The New York Times reviewer, Nate Chinen, suggested Desfado to be "renovator" and wrote it presents Moura's "ambitions even if she had stuck to Portuguese". Whilst Mariano Prunes asserted to say Moura combines "tradition with modernity", Clive Davis for The Times called it "outstanding", and George W. Harris for Jazz Weekly said even if the listener does not understand Portuguese lyrics, they could be felt, as Moura "sings around bouyant, [sic] bouncy and festive strums and sensuous string picking." Simon Broughton for the London Evening Standard gave the album four out of five stars. In his review, he commented Desfado has "nothing melanchol[ic]", but described "Até ao Verão" and "A Fadista" as "gorgeous", but he considered the song "Dream of Fire" as "not memorable"; a similar feeling Peter Margasak had with "Dream of Fire", saying it is "bland" and "superfluous". Also, Margasak, writing for the Chicago Reader, described Moura's voice as "beautiful".

Manuel Halpern wrote for Jornal de Letras, Artes e Ideias that Desfado seems "designed for the Grammys", and that Moura "won wings and discovered a fate beyond fado". Meanwhile, for Visão, he considered that Moura "went around the fado and chose a happier destiny". For Ípsilon, João Bonifácio said that "[a]s the title indicates, Desfado is a kind of deconstruction of fate, except that, instead of the usual in this type of adventure, does not enter into dialogue only with the roots of Portuguese music but other records such as song or ballad almost soul-American." Pedro Mexia noted "[t]he madness and the dream born an album, which some call unorthodox, but she refuses to catalog." Later, he said "A disc that 'is not fado', but that has fado and a fado singer." Alexandra Ho wrote for Sol that Moura is "at risk" and she "echoes the past, but it is the experimentation dictates the future." Ho considered both Prince and Larry Klein as "responsible for the change." For Metro Brasil, Bruno Martins noted the album "is not a new fate", instead, it is "against a way of going to the heart to seek new ways of painting."

Siddhartha Mitter ranked Desfado at number nine on The Boston Globe's "Best Album of '13 Picked by the Globe's Critics", and added that Moura "has made a fado album that breaks traditional rules but pays off in sheer style." Desfado was listed as the Best Album of the Year 2013 in the World Music category by The Sunday Times. In July 2014, the live version of the album, Desfado, ao Vivo no Caixa Alfama, won the Amália Award for "Best Album".

== Track listing ==
Standard edition
No.	Title	Writer(s)	Length
1.	"Desfado"	Pedro da Silva Martins	2:35
2.	"Amor Afoito"	Nuno Figueiredo, Jorge Benvinda	4:05
3.	"Até Ao Verão"	Márcia Santos	4:07
4.	"Despiu a Saudade"	Paulo Abreu de Lima, António Zambujo	3:36
5.	"A Case of You"	Joni Mitchell	5:03
6.	"E Tu Gostavas De Mim"	Miguel Araújo Jorge	2:46
7.	"Havemos de Acordar" (featuring Tim Ries)	Pedro da Silva Martins	5:18
8.	"A Fadista"	Manuela de Freitas, Pedro Rodrigues dos Santos	4:12
9.	"Se Acaso Um Anjo Viesse"	Aldina Duarte, Adriano Batista	1:42
10.	"Fado Alado"	Pedro Abrunhosa	4:20
11.	"A Minha Estrela"	Hermano Sobral, Luísa Sobral	2:48
12.	"Thank You"	David Poe	3:56
13.	"Como Nunca Mais"	Tozé Brito	2:57
14.	"Com A Cabeça Nas Nuvens"	Mário Rainho, Fontes Rocha	2:12
15.	"O Espelho de Alice"	Nuno Miguel Guedes, Armando Machado	3:11
16.	"Dream of Fire" (featuring Herbie Hancock)	Ana Moura, Prince (uncredited)	4:23
17.	"Quando o Sol Espreitar de Novo"	Manel Cruz	4:30
Total length:			61:40

International edition
No.	Title	Length
1.	"Desfado"	2:35
2.	"A Case of You"	5:03
3.	"Até Ao Verão"	4:07
4.	"Havemos de Acordar" (featuring Tim Ries)	5:18
5.	"Thank You"	3:56
6.	"E Tu Gostavas De Mim"	2:46
7.	"Amor Afoito"	4:05
8.	"Fado Alado"	4:20
9.	"A Minha Estrela"	2:48
10.	"A Fadista"	4:12
11.	"Quando o Sol Espreitar de Novo"	4:30
12.	"Com A Cabeça Nas Nuvens"	2:12
13.	"Dream of Fire" (featuring Herbie Hancock)	4:23
14.	"Despiu a Saudade"	3:36

Desfado, ao Vivo no Caixa Alfama Disc 1
No.	Title	Length
1.	"Desfado"	2:35
2.	"Amor Afoito"	4:05
3.	"Até Ao Verão"	4:08
4.	"Despiu a Saudade"	3:36
5.	"A Case of You"	5:03
6.	"E Tu Gostavas de Mim"	2:46
7.	"Havemos de Acordar" (featuring Tim Ries)	5:18
8.	"A Fadista"	4:12
9.	"Se Acaso um Anjo Viesse"	1:18
10.	"Fado Alado"	4:20
11.	"A Minha Estrela"	2:48
12.	"Thank You"	3:56
13.	"Como Nunca Mais"	2:57
14.	"Com a Cabeça nas Nuvens"	2:12
15.	"O Espelho de Alice"	3:11
16.	"Dream of Fire" (featuring Herbie Hancock)	4:23
17.	"Quando o Sol Espreitar de Novo"	4:30

Desfado, ao Vivo no Caixa Alfama Disc 2
No.	Title	Writer(s)	Length
1.	"Amor Afoito (Live)"		4:41
2.	"A Fadista (Live)"		5:08
3.	"E Tu Gostavas de Mim (Live)"		2:57
4.	"Leva-me aos Fados (Live)"	Jorge Fernando	3:19
5.	"Hoje Tudo Me Entristece (Live)"		3:35
6.	"Caso Arrumado (Live)"	Manuela de Freitas, Pedro Rodrigues	2:38
7.	"Porque Teimas Nesta Dor (Live)"		2:38
8.	"Os Búzios (Live)"	Fernando	3:52
9.	"Fado Alado (Live)"		3:52
10.	"Bailinho à Portuguesa (Live)"		3:30
11.	"Desfado (Live)"		2:55

== Personnel ==
Desfado was recorded at Henson Recording Studios, located in Hollywood, California, whilst vocals were recorded at Market Street Studio, Santa Monica, California, and Estúdio Pontozurca, in Almada, Portugal:

- Jay Bellerose - drums, percussion
- Ângelo Freire - Portuguese guitar
- Bernie Grundman - mastering
- Helik Hadar - recorder and mixer
- Herbie Hancock - Fender Rhodes electric piano on "Dream of Fire"
- Larry Klein - record producer
- Freddy Koella - violin and string arrangement on "Thank You"
- Dean Parks - guitars
- David Plitch - bass
- Ana Moura - vocals
- Tim Ries - soprano saxophone on "Havemos de Acordar"
- Pedro Soares - guitar
- Patrick Warren - keyboards

== Chart positions and certifications ==
=== Weekly charts ===
Chart (2013)	Peak position
Belgian Albums (Ultratop Wallonia)	198
Portuguese Albums (AFP)	1
Spanish Albums (Promusicae)	39
US Billboard Top World Albums	7

=== Certifications ===
Country	Certification	Shipments
Portugal (AFP)	6× Platinum	90,000

== Release history ==
Country	Date	Format	Label
Portugal	12 November 2012	CD and digital download	Universal Music Portugal
Poland	22 January 2013	CD and digital download	Universal Music
Spain	5 February 2013	CD and digital download	Universal Music
United States	26 February 2013	CD and digital download	Decca Records
United Kingdom	1 April 2013	CD and digital download	Universal Music
