= Fialho =

Fialho is a Portuguese surname. Notable people with this surname include:

- Alan Fialho (born 1993), Brazilian football player
- André Fialho (born 1994), Portuguese mixed martial artist
- Barbara Fialho (born 1987), Brazilian model and singer
- Éder Fialho (born 1973), Brazilian long-distance runner
- Deborah Fialho Secco (born 1979), Brazilian actress
- José Eduardo Fialho Gouveia, Portuguese television presenter
- José Manuel Bastos Fialho Gouveia (1935–2004), Portuguese television and radio host
- José Valentim Fialho de Almeida (1857–1911), Portuguese writer, journalist and translator
- Maria do Carmo Fialho (born 1960), Brazilian hurdler
