= Andorinhas =

Single by Ana Moura

from the album Casa Guilhermina
- Released: 30 April 2021
- Recorded: 2021
- Genre: Fado, Worldbeat
- Length: 2:57
- Label: Independent
- Songwriters: Ana Moura, Pedro da Linha, Pedro Mafama
- Producers: Pedro da Linha, Pedro Mafama

Ana Moura singles chronology
"'Vinte Vinte'" (2020)	"Andorinhas" (2021)	"'Jacarandá'" (2021)

"Andorinhas" is a single by Ana Moura, and became the first single of her album Casa Guilhermina. It was released on 30 April 2021, and became her first independent release after leaving Universal Music. The song was well received and despite never entering the official Portuguese music charts, it has reached over 6 million streams on Spotify and 11 million on YouTube, as of December 2023. It is still unknown why the song never charted, considering it is the best performing song from the album on streaming services, and the other singles and non-singles have appeared on the 10,000 best-selling songs of 2022, officially released by Audiogest.

== Background ==
Ana Moura entered the studio in 2019 with her usual team and American producer Emile Haynie to record the successor to the multi-platinum album Moura, released in 2015. After recording the basics of the album in Portugal, the producer returned to the United States to continue working on the album but stopped responding to contacts. Confronted with Haynie's ghosting, the artist realized she was frustrated with the wear and tear of her career. The process led to the artist's disengagement from her longtime record label, Universal, and the agency Sons Em Trânsito, as she longed for more creative control and freedom. Moura has shown appreciation for her previous label and management team and has thanked them for allowing so many of her dreams to come true, but she also felt like she needed to fulfill new dreams that didn't align with her old label and management's vision and dreams.

== Lyrics and composition ==
For a long time Moura believed she didn't have the talent for writing lyrics for her songs, as well as her crazy work ethic not allowing her to try to do it. This changed when she asked her manager to stop booking her so many shows. "Andorinhas" became the first song in her career to have been written by Moura, alongside new collaborator Pedro Mafama. They both worked on the song alongside producer Pedro da Linha, who is also responsible for writing the music. The song reflects the feeling of finally being set free and sets a significant shift in her sound, for the first time in her career. Moura described the song as being a "symbol of freedom and emancipation, of creativity in its purest form." The lyrics in the song refer to swallows, a type of bird very common in Portugal that are easily found during the spring and summer seasons, that migrate to hotter regions of Europe and Africa during fall and winter. Moura refers to swallows as "never dying, spring never ending and rebirth being a constant". Moura recalls this song being important to her as she needed the strength to be free to make her own choices.

== Release and promotion ==
The song was officially released on 30 April 2021 on digital download and streaming. The song was performed on the 10-year anniversary special episode of The Voice Portugal, which aired on 31 December 2021. Moura has stated that she didn't think of this song as the lead single from the album, but it ended up making the most sense, as it perfectly reflects her feeling of wanting to be free, strong and independent. The song was performed as part of her Casa Guilhermina Tour, with one of the shows having been filmed and aired on RTP1 on 22 June 2023. She also performed the song on an episode of the HBO Max original series Acoustic Home, which premiered on 26 May 2023.

== Music video ==
The song was released alongside its official music video, filmed on rooftops of a popular neighborhood in Olhão. In the music video, Moura presents herself with a new image and posture, further marking the changes in her career. In the video, we see Moura sharing her space with people who dance and feel, showing a new visual identity that is authentic and universal. Angolan singer Paulo Flores makes a cameo in the video. The music video was directed by André Caniços, with the help of Pedro da Linha, who produced and wrote the music, and Pedro Mafama, who wrote the lyrics with Moura and helped her coming up with the concept. She wanted this video to reflect her life story, as her family lived in that neighborhood when they returned from Angola.

== Awards and nominations ==
Awards and nominations for "Andorinhas"
Organization	Year	Category	Result	Ref.
Golden Globes	2022	Best Song	Won	
PLAY - Portuguese Music Awards	2022	Song of the Year	Nominated	
PLAY - Portuguese Music Awards	2022	Best Music Video	Won	
