= Susana Félix =

Portuguese singer and actress (born 1975)

- Born: Susana Félix; 12 October 1975 (age 51); Torres Vedras, Portugal
- Genres: Pop, pop rock
- Occupations: Singer-songwriter, record producer, musician, actress
- Instrument: Vocals (Mezzo-soprano)
- Years active: 1999–present
- Labels: Sony BMG, Farol

Susana Félix (born 12 October 1975, in Torres Vedras) is a Portuguese singer, songwriter, musician, actress, producer.

In 2006, she was the artistic coordinator of the show Sexta Feira 13 – O Musical Xutos & Pontapés, after the Portuguese band Xutos & Pontapés. Susana was also the Portuguese singing voice of Pocahontas, the Disney character. Her musical career started in 1999 and since then she has released several albums. The first disc came out in that same year, Um Pouco Mais. Three years later, Susana released Rosa E Vermelho. In 2006, Índigo was launched. In 2007, was released Pulsação, an album with the best of her career and some new tracks. "(Bem) Na Minha Mão" was the first single.

In 2009 together with Mafalda Arnauth, Viviane and Luanda Cozetti gives voice to the original lyrics by Ary dos Santos on the album Rua da Saudade, being the voice of the first single extracted "Canção de Madrugar".

== Life and career ==
=== Early life ===
Susana Félix was born in Torres Vedras on 12 October 1975. As a lover of the arts, she has always devoted herself to singing and in early 1988, only 12 years old, she won the Great Night of Fado in the Coliseu dos Recreios in Lisbon. She sang "Maria Da Cruz", a theme of Amalia that her mother taught her. From 1989 to 1994 she did amateur theater in her hometown. She was also national vice champion in figure-skating and attended university studying biology.

=== 1995–2000: Early career and debut studio album ===
In 1995 she participated in the RTP "national team" and begun her musical studies at the Academia de Amadores de Música. Also in that same year, she was chosen by Disney to sing the songs of the character in the movie Pocahontas. She later participated in the films Hercules and Lion King II: Simba's Pride. However starts working as a session singer recording several spot advertisements and participating in the album "A cor do fogo" by Mafalda Veiga and became an integral part of the band's singer and backing vocals.

Susana participated in the "All the Stage" by Filipe La Féria and was invited to act as an actress and singer in the musical "chameleon Virtual Rock" and the show "40 years of RTP".

In 1997, Susana collaborated on records with João Pedro Pais and Luis Damas.

In 1998, begins to compose and starts the recording of her debut. In the following year, she released the album "Um Pouco Mais" with themes like "Mais olhos (que barriga)" (written by Mafalda Veiga) and "Um Lugar Encantado".

In 2000, she tours the country from north to south on a tour of 40 shows.

=== 2000–2005: Second and third studio album ===
In 2001, she continued touring and participates as an actress in the series "SOS Children" and also in the soap opera "Greed". Susana Félix wrote a song for the soundtrack of the telenovela. During that same year, TVI invites her to compose the soundtrack of the series "Wild Angel" and is named for the "premium bus" in the category of music.

In 2002, headed the vocal album "Winter Day. S" of the Portuguese Spelling Nadja and composed the soundtrack of the soap opera "Sunrise". In the same year she launched her second album of original "Rosa e Vermelho".

In 2003 produces, together with Nuno Faria and Fernando Abrantes, the album "Sea confidante" of Joana Melo. During the year 2004, she was on stage at the Teatro Sao Luiz and actress / singer in the musical "Portugal-A Musical Comedy", directed by António Feio and Sérgio Godinho.

2005 was devoted to composition, pre-production and recording her third album of originals "Indigo". This album was released in early 2006 with production and arrangements in charge of their own Susana Felix and Renato Júnior. This disc appears as a composer and has written most of the letters. The first single was "Flutuo".

=== 2006–present: Compilation album and tour, TV Series and tribute album ===
In early 2006 artfully coordinated the show "Friday 13 – The Musical Xutos e kicks (musical structured songs in the group) and also participated in Season 1 Dance with Me, being one of the semi-finalists. Also in 2006 participated as an actress in the series "Nome de Código: Sintra" performed by Jorge Paixão da Costa, transmitted by RTP and the series "An Adventure" broadcast on SIC. Was also invited to write and interpret the official anthem of Raríssimas (national association of mental and rare) composing the theme "The same look." In 2007 she launched her fourth album "Pulsação" which brings together themes of their previous albums, the themes revisited (rearranged and rewritten) as well as two originals, one being the single step "(Bem) Na minha mão". It also participates in Operation Triunfo gala of RTP1 with 2 OT's competitors and "It is a kind of magazine" playing "I'm not the only" by Xutos e pontapés.

In 2009, together with Mafalda Arnauth, Viviane and Luanda Cozetti gives voice to the original lyrics by Ary dos Santos on the album Rua da Saudade, being the voice of the first single extracted "Canção de Madrugar".

=== Personal life ===
Susana Félix has a daughter whose the father is the journalist José Eduardo Fialho Gouveia, son of television presenter Fialho Gouveia (1935 - 2004).

== Discography ==
=== Studio and compilation albums ===
Susana Félix discography
- Studio albums: 3
- Compilation albums: 1
- Tribute albums: 1
- Singles: 13

Year	Album details	Peak chart positions	Certifications (sales thresholds)
Year	Album details	POR	Certifications (sales thresholds)
1999	Um pouco mais: Released: 1999; Label: Farol; Formats: CD, digital download, CS	1	POR: Platinum
2001	Rosa e Vermelho: Released: 2002; Label: Farol; Formats: CD, digital download	3	POR: 2× Gold
2006	Índigo: Released: 2006; Label: Farol; Formats: CD, digital download	1	POR: 3× Platinum
2007	Pulsação: Released: 19 December 2009; Label: Farol; Formats: CD, digital download	6	POR: 3× Platinum
"—" denotes releases that did not chart or were not released in that country.

=== Tribute and cover albums ===
Year	Album details	Peak chart positions	Certifications (sales thresholds)
Year	Album details	POR	Certifications (sales thresholds)
2009	Rua Da Saudade: Released: 2009; Label: Farol; Formats: CD, digital download, CS	1	POR: Platinum
"—" denotes releases that did not chart or were not released in that country.

=== Singles ===
- "Mais Olhos (Que Barriga)" (1999)
- "Um Lugar Encantado" (1999)
- "Pó de Amar" (2001)
- "Ficou" (2002)
- "Luz de Presença" (2002)
- "Flutuo" (2006)
- "Concilios" (2006)
- "Luz na Ponte" (2006)
- "Sou Eu" (2006)
- "Fintar a Pulsação" (2006)
- "(Bem) Na minha mão"(2007)
- "Amanhecer (Sempre Mais Uma Vez)" (2007)
- "Canção De Madrugar"(2009)
