= Pulsação =

Compilation album by Susana Félix
- Released: November 19, 2007
- Recorded: 1999–2007 (except new versions)
- Genre: Pop, pop rock
- Length: 37:06 (first release); 40:04 (second release)
- Language: Portuguese
- Label: Farol
- Producer: Susana Félix; Reanto Jr.

Susana Félix chronology
Índigo (2006)	Pulsação (2007)	Rua Da Saudade (2009)

Singles from Pulsação
- 1. "(Bem) Na minha mão" Released: December 20, 2007; 2. "Amanhecer (Sempre Mais Uma Vez)" Released: February 12, 2008

Professional ratings
Review scores
Source	Rating
DiscoDigital.com	Favourable
Edusurfa	4/5 stars
NovaGuarda	3/5 stars
Qmusika	3.5/5 stars
Reconquista	3/5 stars

Pulsação is the first compilation album by the Portuguese pop singer Susana Félix. It was released on November 19, 2007. It includes "Mais Olhos (Que Barriga)" and "Um Lugar Enacantado", the two first singles from Felix's debut album Um Pouco mais. The rest of the songs are taken from the other two albums, Rosa e Vermelho and Índigo.

All the songs are written by Susana Félix. The album was produced by Susana Félix and Renato Jr., as were the previous albums Um Pouco Mais, Rosa e Vermelho and Índigo.

Two new songs, "(Bem) Na minha mão" and "Amanhecer (Sempre Mais Uma Vez)", were written and recorded for this album and released as singles.

== Reception ==
=== Critical response ===
Reviews for Pulsação were generally favourable; it holds a score of 72/100 in AlbumScores based on seven professional reviews.

Edusurfa and ABCmusic gave a rating of 4 out of 5, saying that Pulsaçãois one of the best Portuguese compilations ever (ABCmusic gave a rating of 7 out of 10 for the second version). Nova Guarda and Reconquista gave the album a rating of 3 out of 5 stars.

DiscoDigital.com gave a positive review of the album and said, "Susana Félix is a curious case in the national pop. Usually surrounded by highly respectable names, has not reached the right ears to be respected as it deserves. Susana Felix had everything to have a career as a one hit wonder with "Mais Olhos (Que Barriga)" (1999) and she had several episodes as previous participation in a project of Mafalda Veiga and various collaborations. Now with 32 years and after three albums, which has to debug the pop song but not always as regularly as desired in all subjects, 'Pulsação' recalls some of his best moments while the relaxed versions. Surrounded by names like Rafael and Pedro Nuno Gonçalves, Susana Felix hits on this record that that is your state of grace and at the same time, consolidating the status of singer respectful. In this respect, 'Pulsação' may finally get the right people that will provide due recognition. For example, "(Bem) Na Minha Mão", one of two unpublished herein, and signed by herself reveals that it is and that should be your special place: a safe song, well sung and arranged with exquisite. Neither more nor less, is to pop in all its splendor."

Qmusika gave a rating of 3.5 out of 5.

=== Commercial ===
The album debuted at number one on the Portuguese Album Chart.

== Track listing ==
The following track list has twelve songs, most of them taken from the previous three albums, plus two new songs: "(Bem) Na Minha mão" and "Amanhecer (Sempre Mais Uma Vez)".

First release
No.	Title	Writer(s)	Genre	Length
1.	"(Bem) Na minha mão" (new song)	Susana Félix	Pop, pop rock	3:35
2.	"Amanhecer (Sempre Mais Uma Vez)" (new song)	Susana Félix	Pop, pop rock	2:44
3.	"Um Lugar Encantado" (from Um pouco mais)	Susana Félix	Pop, pop rock	3:17
4.	"Mais olhos (Que Barriga)" (from Um pouco mais)	Susana Félix	Pop, pop rock	3:06
5.	"Flutuo" (from Índigo)	Susana Félix	Pop, pop rock	3:22
6.	"Pó De Amar" (from Rosa e Vermelho)	Susana Félix	Pop, pop rock	5:16
7.	"Sou Eu" (from Índigo)	Susana Félix	Pop, pop rock	3:12
8.	"Ficou" (from Rosa e Vermelho)	Susana Félix	Pop, pop rock	4:32
9.	"Luz De Presença" (from Rosa e Vermelho)	Susana Félix	Pop, pop rock	4:41
10.	"Fintar a Pulsação" (from Índigo)	Susana Félix	Pop, pop rock	3:22
11.	"Concilios" (from Índigo)	Susana Félix	Pop, pop rock	3:18

Second release
No.	Title	Writer(s)	Genre	Length
12.	"Luz na Ponte" (from Índigo)	Susana Félix	Pop, pop rock	2:58

== Personnel ==
Information retrieved from Félix's official blog.

- Renato Junior – keyboards
- Nuno Rafael – guitar
- Alexandre Frazão – drums
- Maximo Cavali – violi
- Jorge Teixeira – Portuguese guitar
- Vasco Brôco – violin
- Tózé Miranda – violin
- Jeremy Lake – violoncel
- João Cabrita – saxophone
- João Marques – fliscorne
- Jorge Ribeiro – trombone

== Charts ==
Chart (2007)	Peak Position
Portuguese Albums Chart	1

== Release history ==
Region	Date	Label	Format	Catalogue
Portugal	November 19, 2007	Farol	CD	B0007YH6AG
