= List of number-one albums of 2023 (Portugal) =

The Portuguese Albums Chart ranks the best-performing albums in Portugal, as compiled by the Associação Fonográfica Portuguesa.

Number-one albums in Portugal
← 2022 • 2023 • 2024 →

Number-one albums of 2023 in Portugal
Week	Album	Artist	Reference
1	Casa Guilhermina	Ana Moura	
2	Casa Guilhermina	Ana Moura	
3	The Dark Side of the Moon	Pink Floyd	
4	Rush!	Måneskin	
5	The Dark Side of the Moon	Pink Floyd	
6	Harry's House	Harry Styles	
7	Midnights	Taylor Swift	
8	Casa Guilhermina	Ana Moura	
9	Cracker Island	Gorillaz	
10	Portuguesa	Carminho	
11	Endless Summer Vacation	Miley Cyrus	
12	Songs of Surrender	U2	
13	Did You Know That There's a Tunnel Under Ocean Blvd	Lana Del Rey	
14	The Dark Side of the Moon Live at Wembley 1974	Pink Floyd	
15	Meteora	Linkin Park	
16	72 Seasons	Metallica	
17	72 Seasons	Metallica	
18	First Two Pages of Frankenstein	The National	
19	D-Day	Agust D	
20	Random Access Memories	Daft Punk	
21	Oyto	David Carreira	
22	V.H.S – Vol. 1	Fernando Daniel	
23	5-Star	Stray Kids	
24	5-Star	Stray Kids	
25	5-Star	Stray Kids	
26	5-Star	Stray Kids	
27	5-Star	Stray Kids	
28	Speak Now (Taylor's Version)	Taylor Swift	
29	Speak Now (Taylor's Version)	Taylor Swift	
30	5-Star	Stray Kids	
31	5-Star	Stray Kids	
32	5-Star	Stray Kids	
33	Speak Now (Taylor's Version)	Taylor Swift	
34	ISTJ	NCT Dream	
35	ISTJ	NCT Dream	
36	Speak Now (Taylor's Version)	Taylor Swift	
37	Guts	Olivia Rodrigo	
38	Guts	Olivia Rodrigo	
39	Guts	Olivia Rodrigo	
40	Guts	Olivia Rodrigo	
41	The Dark Side of the Moon Redux	Roger Waters	
42	The Name Chapter: Freefall	Tomorrow X Together	
43	Hackney Diamonds	The Rolling Stones	
44	1989 (Taylor's Version)	Taylor Swift	
45	Golden	Jung Kook	
46	Golden	Jung Kook	
47	1989 (Taylor's Version)	Taylor Swift	
48	1989 (Taylor's Version)	Taylor Swift	
49	1989 (Taylor's Version)	Taylor Swift	
50	1989 (Taylor's Version)	Taylor Swift	
51	1989 (Taylor's Version)	Taylor Swift	
52	1989 (Taylor's Version)	Taylor Swift	

== See also ==
- List of number-one singles of 2023 (Portugal)
