= Rumo ao Sul =

Single by Ana Moura

from the album Leva-me aos Fados
- Released: February 20, 2010
- Recorded: 2009
- Genre: Fado, acoustic
- Length: 3:51
- Label: World Village
- Songwriter(s): Fernando, Viana
- Producer(s): Jorge Fernado

Ana Moura singles chronology
"'Não é Um Fado Normal'" (2009)	"Rumo ao Sul" (2010)	"'Como Uma Núvem No Céu'" (2010)

"Rumo ao Sul" is a single by Ana Moura from the album Leva-me aos Fados. It was released on February 20, 2010 in Portugal.

== Recording and production ==
In 2009, Moura began recording rough demos at World Village studios in Lisbon, Portugal. The demos consisted of Moura's lyrical ideas over various backing tracks. The demos were later rearranged and real instruments were added to replace the samples or keyboards initially emulating them. All string and orchestral arrangements were recorded at World Village studios in Lisbon by Ana Moura and Jorge Fernando. The song was mixed at the studios by Jorge Fernando.

== Music video ==
The music video follows the aesthetics of the previous music videos from this album.

== Official versions ==
- Album version - 3:51
- Single version - 3:51
