= Jacarandá (song) =

Single by Ana Moura

from the album Casa Guilhermina
- Released: 25 June 2021
- Genre: Kizomba, pop
- Length: 3:33
- Label: Independent
- Songwriters: Ana Moura, Pedro Mafama, Pedro da Linha
- Producer: Pedro da Linha

Ana Moura singles chronology
"Andorinhas" (2021)	"Jacarandá" (2021)	"Agarra em Mim" (2022)

"Jacarandá" is a song by Portuguese singer Ana Moura, released on 25 June 2021 as the second single from her seventh studio album, Casa Guilhermina (2022). The song was written as a tribute to American musician Prince, with whom Moura maintained a friendship, and features guitarist Mike Scott, who had previously worked with Prince.

== Background and composition ==
"Jacarandá" was written as a tribute to Prince, with whom Ana Moura maintained a friendship. Moura recalled that Prince appreciated her music but had told her that he wanted to hear her sing over a more prominent beat. Moura later fulfilled that idea with "Jacarandá", building the song around a kizomba beat.

The lyrics contain several allusions to Prince and to Moura's memories of the musician. The opening reference to a "red suit" and a "shiny cane" evokes the flamboyant image for which Prince was known, while the colour purple later appears through the imagery of a "lilac sky" and a "purple heart", recalling Prince's strong association with the colour and his work Purple Rain. Throughout the song, Prince is portrayed as a continuing presence in Moura's memory, symbolized by the jacaranda trees that give the song its title.

Other references in the lyrics are more personal. Moura recalls moments shared with Prince, including references to limoncello and ping-pong, presented as intimate memories of their relationship. Moura has stated that while composing the song she recalled experiences she had shared with Prince, which contributed to the song's creation.

The connection to Prince also extends to the recording itself. Moura invited guitarist Mike Scott, who had worked with Prince, to play electric guitar on the track. Pedro da Linha handled the song's production.

== Release and promotion ==
"Jacarandá" was released digitally on 25 June 2021. It followed "Andorinhas", released in April 2021, becoming the second song released in advance of what would later be announced as Casa Guilhermina.

The song was eventually included as the eleventh track on Casa Guilhermina, released on 11 November 2022. The album combined fado with several musical traditions, including semba, kizomba and other African and Portuguese influences. The song was performed as part of her Casa Guilhermina Tour, with one of the shows having been filmed and aired on RTP1 on 22 June 2023.

== Music video ==
An official music video for "Jacarandá" was released alongside the single on 25 June 2021. The video was conceived by filmmaker João Botelho, with executive production by Ana Moura and Miguel Carvalho and cinematography by Bernardo Lima Infante.

== Reception ==
"Jacarandá" was included in Antena 3's list of the best Portuguese songs of 2021, where it was ranked at number 24. The station described the song as one of the tracks that introduced a new era in Moura's career and highlighted Pedro da Linha's production.

Following the release of Casa Guilhermina, the song continued to be singled out as one of the album's representations of Moura's move beyond conventional fado. In retrospective coverage, it has frequently been identified as an ode to Prince and as one of the songs through which Moura incorporated African rhythmic influences into her music.

== Personnel ==
Credits adapted from the official music video.

- Ana Moura – vocals, lyrics
- Pedro Mafama – lyrics
- Pedro da Linha – music, production
- Mike Scott – electric guitar
