= Rua da Saudade =

Compilation album by Various
- Released: November 2009
- Recorded: 2009
- Genre: Pop, jazz, bossa nova
- Length: 40 min.
- Label: Farol
- Producer: Renato Jr.

Various chronology
Pulsação (2007)	Rua da Saudade (2009)

Singles from Rua da Saudade
- 1. "Canção de Madrugar" Released: December 2009

Rua da Saudade is a combination album. It was released in November 2009 and produced by Renato Jr. It recalls the work of Ary dos Santos, 25 years after his death. With 11 songs written by Fernando Tordo, Nuno Nazareth Fernandes, and Tózé Brito, it gave voice to original lyrics by Ary dos Santos, Susana Félix together with Mafalda Arnauth, Viviane and Luanda Cozetti.

== Reception ==
Professional ratings
Review scores
Source	Rating
DiscoDigital.com	(Favorable)
Wordpress.com	(Favorable)

The album was well-received by critics. DiscoDigital said 'Rua da Sausade forms a triangle with virtual Humano and Amalia Hoje. All different in approach, all equal in how they communicate in fundamental references of Portuguese culture.

"Rua da Saudade was part of an idea of Ary dos Santos to join four female voices - Viviane, Susana Félix, Mafalda Arnauth and Luanda Cozzeti - to honor Ary dos Santos, on the 25th anniversary of his death.

"Of the four singers, but no compromises are Susana Felix and Mafalda Arnauth, this bright outside the scope of fate, clearly at home in time to swim out standing, who shines most. The arrangements often distance themselves from the original but rarely go beyond the average (which is different from the median): sober, it is a fact, but without wing coup.

"If Ary dos Santos was a man ahead of his time, why a disk so conservative? Not that the poet's words are lost in space and time but the (re)discovery of a personality as bold deserved a little more daring." Wordpress also gave a positive review.

== Singles ==
- "Canção de Madrugar" was the lead single and it was released in December 2009.

== Track listing ==
1. Café (Susana Félix/Viviane)
2. Cai Cai (Susana Félix)
3. Canção de Madrugar (Susana Félix)
4. Canção do Tempo (Luanda Cozetti/Mafalda Arnauth)
5. Cavalo à Solta (Viviane)
6. Dizer Que Sim à Vida (Luanda Cozetti)
7. Estrela da Tarde (Mafalda Arnauth)
8. Kirie (Mafalda Arnauth)
9. Quando um Homem Quiser (Viviane)
10. Retalhos (Luanda Cozetti)
11. Rock Chock (Everyone)♥
- ♥ Everyone: Susana Félix; Viviane; Luanda Cozetti; Mafalda Arnauth
