= List of number-one albums of 2022 (Portugal) =

The Portuguese Albums Chart ranks the best-performing albums in Portugal, as compiled by the Associação Fonográfica Portuguesa.

Number-one albums in Portugal
← 2021 • 2022 • 2023 →

Week	Album	Artist	Reference
1/2022	Recomeçar	Tony Carreira	
2/2022	A Minha História	Sara Carreira	
3/2022	30	Adele	
4/2022	Presente	Fernando Daniel	
5/2022	The Dark Side of the Moon	Pink Floyd	
6/2022	The Dark Side of the Moon	Pink Floyd	
7/2022	30	Adele	
8/2022	Pulse	Pink Floyd	
9/2022	Perfil	Dulce Pontes	
10/2022	Perfil	Dulce Pontes	
11/2022	So Happy It Hurts	Bryan Adams	
12/2022	Motomami	Rosalía	
13/2022	Motomami	Rosalía	
14/2022	Unlimited Love	Red Hot Chili Peppers	
15/2022	Unlimited Love	Red Hot Chili Peppers	
16/2022	Unlimited Love	Red Hot Chili Peppers	
17/2022	Cantigas do Maio	José Afonso	
18/2022	Cantigas do Maio	José Afonso	
19/2022	We	Arcade Fire	
20/2022	We	Arcade Fire	
21/2022	Harry's House	Harry Styles	
22/2022	Harry's House	Harry Styles	
23/2022	Harry's House	Harry Styles	
24/2022	Proof	BTS	
25/2022	Harry's House	Harry Styles	
26/2022	Venham Mais Cinco	José Afonso	
27/2022	Harry's House	Harry Styles	
28/2022	Harry's House	Harry Styles	
29/2022	Harry's House	Harry Styles	
30/2022	Harry's House	Harry Styles	
31/2022	Harry's House	Harry Styles	
32/2022	Harry's House	Harry Styles	
33/2022	Harry's House	Harry Styles	
34/2022	Finally Enough Love	Madonna	
35/2022	Will of the People	Muse	
36/2022	Harry Styles	Harry Styles	
37/2022	Harry Styles	Harry Styles	
38/2022	Born Pink	Blackpink	
39/2022	Born Pink	Blackpink	
40/2022	Coro dos Tribunais	José Afonso	
41/2022	Animals	Pink Floyd	
42/2022	Return of the Dream Canteen	Red Hot Chili Peppers	
43/2022	Midnights	Taylor Swift	
44/2022	Midnights	Taylor Swift	
45/2022	Midnights	Taylor Swift	
46/2022	Casa Guilhermina	Ana Moura	
47/2022	Casa Guilhermina	Ana Moura	
48/2022	Casa Guilhermina	Ana Moura	
49/2022	Casa Guilhermina	Ana Moura	
50/2022	Casa Guilhermina	Ana Moura	
51/2022	Casa Guilhermina	Ana Moura	
52/2022	Casa Guilhermina	Ana Moura	

== See also ==
- List of number-one singles of 2022 (Portugal)
