= Aconteceu =

Studio album by Ana Moura
- Released: 2004
- Genre: Fado
- Length: 59:03
- Labels: Mercury, Universal Music Portugal

Ana Moura chronology
Guarda-me A Vida Na Mão (2003)	Aconteceu (2004)	Para Além da Saudade (2007)

Aconteceu, translated as It Happened, is the second album released by fado singer Ana Moura. It was released in 2004 by Mercury Records and Universal Music Portugal. AllMusic gave the album a rating of three stars. Reviewer Jeff Tamarkin wrote: "[N]early every song on Ana Moura's divine, alluring second album finds the singer heartbreaking. . . . In a full-bodied, commanding voice, . . . Moura . . . deftly displays the requisite over-the-top emotion of fado, sounding utterly natural doing so."

== Track listing ==
Disc One

1. "Por Um Dia" (Jorge Fernando) [3:35]
2. "Ao Poeta Perguntei" [2:07]
3. "O Que Foi Que Aconteceu" [3:39]
4. "Ouvi Dizer Que Me Esqueceste" (Jorge Fernando) [3:26]
5. "Fado de Pessoa" [3:44]
6. "Amor de Uma Noite" (Jorge Fernando) [3:13]
7. "Eu Quero" (Júlio Vieitas) [3:02]
8. "Bailinho à Portuguesa" [2:41]
9. "Creio" (Jorge Fernando) [2:00]
10. "Através Do Teu Coração" [2:41]

Disc Two

1. "Como O Tempo Corre" [2:59]
2. "Hoje Tudo Me Entristece" (Jorge Fernando) [3:10]
3. "Passos Na Rua" (Carlos Manuel) [3:01]
4. "Mouraria" [2:17]
5. "Fado Menor" (Santos Moreira) [3:38]
6. "Dentro da Tempestade" [3:01]
7. "Cumplicidade" (Jorge Fernando) [2:15]
8. "Ó Meu Amigo João" (Fado Corrido, Jorge Fernando) [2:22]
9. "Venho Falar Dos Meus Medos" [3:00]
10. "Nada Que Devas Saber" (Francisco Viana) [3:12]
