= Salvatore Farina (essayist) =

Italian essayist, cultural researcher and photographer (born 1959)

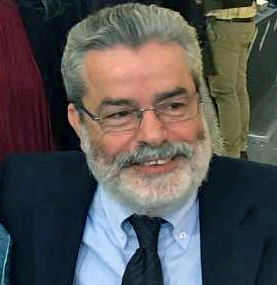
- Born: 12 December 1959 (age 66); Mussomeli, Italy
- Occupations: Essayist; cultural researcher; teacher; photographer

Salvatore Farina (Italian: [salva'tore fa'rina]; born 12 December 1959) is an Italian essayist, cultural researcher, and photographer.

He teaches philosophy and history at the Liceo Classico "Ruggero Settimo" in Caltanissetta dealing in parallel with cultural research and photography.
Today he is known above all as the author of essays and articles on Sicilian pastry making of international importance, in particular Sweet sensations of Sicily.

== Biography ==
At the beginning of the 1990s he was the author of photos illustrating the popular religious traditions of central Sicily and created guides to Holy Week in the provinces of Caltanissetta and Enna.

At the conclusion of the pastoral visit of Pope John Paul II to Sicily (8-10 May 1993), the bishop of Caltanissetta Alfredo Maria Garsia pays homage to the pontiff with a box created for the occasion which includes the anastatic reprint of Holy Thursday in Caltanissetta. Uses, customs, traditions and legends by Michele Alesso (1903) with letter of introduction from the bishop, preface created by Farina and Attilio Scimone and 16 color photographs on fine paper by the latter of the same number "vare" nissene. The delivery to the pontiff took place on the stage set up in the square of the Amaro Averna.

With his students in 2002 he stood out as the author of the philosophical short film The knife on the side of the handle broadcast by Rai Educational. In 2005 he was the author, again with his students, of the commercial Prosciutto sull'occhi, finalist for Italy in the European Food 4U competition promoted by the Ministry for Agricultural and Forestry Policies.

In June 2004 he rediscovered and took care to bring out of oblivion with a conference the Italian-American figure of Mario Savio, protagonist of the protest on the campus of University of California - Berkeley on 1 October 1964.

In the same period Farina began to establish himself as a scholar of Sicilian pastry art and the popular traditions that this art implies: in 2003 «following the thread of ethno-anthropological research» publishes the first edition of the essay Dolcezze di Sicily and in 2004 and 2005 he hit the news for being among the protagonists who try to rediscover and reevaluate the tradition of Sicilian sweets of the so-called "festival of the dead" on 2 November with the Nissena event S-cultures of sugar .

He thus becomes the correspondent for Sicily of the periodical Pasticceria Internazionale and collaborates with Gambero Rosso for the drafting of the guide Pasticceri&Pasticcerie 2012, and with the newspaper La Sicilia.

In April 2006 in the pavilions of the Istitución Ferial of Monzón in Spain curated with the photographer Melo Minnella Semana Santa en Sicilia, exhibition of 50 images dedicated to the popular festivals of the Easter period in the various Sicilian provinces.

In 2009 Salvatore Farina, with around forty master pastry chefs protagonists of the International Artisan Ice Cream, Pastry and Bakery Exhibition of Rimini of that year, founded the «cultural association of Sicilian pastry, pastry and ice cream making» Duciezio, of which he became the president.

Also in 2009, Dolcezze di Sicilia. History and traditions of Sicilian pastry making was republished in an expanded edition, also in English like Sweet sensations of Sicily. The legacy of Biagio Settepani with forty-six original masters recipes. The book wins the "Orio Vergani" prize 2010 awarded by the Italian Academy of Cuisine «to people, bodies or associations which, outside the Academy, have greatly honored, with their activity, the gastronomic culture and the Civilization of the Italian Table, in any field, in Italy or abroad". The usual presentations of the book are related by well-known figures such as Vincenzo Consolo to Milan, Livia Chiriotti in Bologna, and Rita Cedrini in Palermo.

Dolcezze di Sicilia becomes an international point of reference for the study of Sicilian pastry making, both in the academic and literary fields. We find it cited in

- Stefano Rapisarda, Carmelo Spadaro di Passanitello and Pasquale Musso, The «Cooking Recipe Book» of San Martino delle Scale (Palermo, Municipal Library, 3QqB151). Edition and study, in "Bulletin. Center for Sicilian philological and linguistic studies", vol. 21 (2007), p. 243-322.
- Celebrations. Proceedings of the Oxford Symposium of Food and Cookery 2011, Oxford Symposium, 2012.
- Alan Davidson and Tom Jaine, The Oxford Companion to Food, Oxford University Press, 2013.
- Marco Blanco, La cassata, multiethnic 'pasticzu, in Giuseppe Barone, World history of Sicily, Rome-Bari, Laterza, 2018, p. 157-160.
- Forms of Sicilian cuisine. Exercises in the semiotics of taste, edited by Alice Giannitrapani and Davide Puca, Milan, Meltemi, 2020.
- Anca-Luminiţa Iancu and Alexandra Mitrea, [Food Cultures across Time. Flavors and Endeavors], Cambridge Scholars Publishing, 2021.

In 2023 the American best-selling writer Lisa Scottoline in the Author's Note at the end of her historical novel Loyalty (fourth place among the best-selling novels of the New York Times) writes that Sweet sensations of Sicily by Salvatore Farina was one of his three favorite books on modern Sicilian cuisine.

In recent years as president of "Duciezio" Salvatore Farina has been committed to promoting and enhancing Sicilian confectionery culture with initiatives such as the presentation of Dolcezze di Sicilia within the exhibition created by the province of Palermo for the centenary of the birth of Renato Guttuso, or the creation of the Sicilian dessert exhibition in Palermo.

As an expert in Sicilian pastry making in 2015 he was called to illustrate the history of cassata in the official video created by the Sicilian Region and Cluster Sicilia BioMediterraneo for the Expo 2015 at Milan. And in 2017 he is a professor at the University of Catania in the teaching laboratory Cooking as a cultural heritage, where he held a lesson on «The flavor of the ritual in traditional Sicilian desserts».

On 21 November 2019 Farina, as President of Duciezio and 2010 AIC Orio Vergani Award winner, is called to report to the Italian Consulate General in Paris on the topic "Sicilian Pastry in the Diet Mediterranea" on the occasion of the 4th Edition of the Week of Italian Cuisine in the World.

In 2015 he made his debut in fiction with The incredible story of don Turiddu u gazzusaru.

Again for Edizioni Lussografica he directs the series La Storia sia noi. I could write a book, in which the latest release was Terra! But no homeland by Ti-Noune Moïse, with a preface by Sandrone Dazieri and with an in-depth analysis on Giuseppe Scalarini. Moïse's work will lead him to be invited in November 2023 with the author to the XII edition of BookCity Milano.

In 2019 the book On the Wings of the Woodpecker saw the light of day, presented at the ice cream, 14 April 2019. It is the story of the famous Picchio pastry shop in Loreto and features the preface signed by Cardinal Angelo Comastri and texts by Andrea Bocelli and Iginio Massari. The volume will also be presented in May 2019 at the Turin Book Fair in the spaces of the Marche Region by the regional councilor for Culture.

In 2023 he is among the authors of the texts of the illustrated volume Caltanissetta. Tale of a city, with a presentation by Gaetano Savatteri. The volume was appreciated by Leandro Janni, president of Italia Nostra Sicilia, and had the good wishes of the main Nissene authorities.

In 2024 he edited the introduction, the guide to the city of Agira and the photographic apparatus of the volume Antu di sweets. Confectionery tradition of Agira by Manuela Daidone.

On 24 January 2024, together with a group of professionals from Caltanissetta, Farina founded the cultural association "Rosario Assunto" becoming its president and in this capacity announced a national school competition of philosophy videos dedicated to the third centenary of his birth by Immanuel Kant. The competition will be chaired by Zap Mangusta and the awards ceremony will be participation of the singer-songwriter Mariano Deidda as well as a crew from TG2.

== Works ==
- Misteri nisseni, Viterbo, Stampa Alternativa/Nuovi Equilibri, 1991.
- Michele Alesso, Il Giovedì Santo in Caltanissetta. Con sedici fotografie a colori delle vare di Salvatore Farina e Attilio Scimone, presentation by S.E. Mons. Alfredo M. Garsia vescovo di Caltanissetta, Caltanissetta, Lussografica, 1993.
- Settimana santa nella provincia di Caltanissetta, Palermo, Krea, 1995; 2002.
- Photos in Calogero Scarlata, S. Maria La Nova. La Cattedrale di Caltanissetta, Caltanissetta, Lussografica, 1997.
- Settimana Santa di Caltanissetta, Caltanissetta, Azienda Autonoma Provinciale Incremento Turistico di Caltanissetta, 1999; 2007.
- Photos in Luca Caviezel, Scienza e tecnologia di sorbetti, granite e dintorni, Pinerolo, Chiriotti, 2002. ISBN 88-85022-77-4.
- Dolcezze di Sicilia. Arte cultura storia e tradizioni dei dolci e della pasticceria siciliana, Caltanissetta, Lussografica-Soham, 2003. ISBN 88-8243-084-7; 2009.
- Me pijo n'caffè., Caltanissetta, Lussografica-Soham, 2004. ISBN 978-88-8241-192-3.
- La città degli angeli. Immagini del cimitero di Caltanissetta, con Melo Minnella e Angelo Pitrone, Caltanissetta, Salvatore Sciascia, 2006. ISBN 978-88-8241-192-3.
- Sicilia. Non solo mare. Viaggio letterario e per immagini all'interno dell'isola. Sicilia centro orientale, con Gaetano Gambino e Enzo Papa, Siracusa-Roma, Lombardi Editore, 2008. ISBN 978-88-7260-167-9; 2009. ISBN 978-88-7260-207-2.
- (in English) Sweet sensations of Sicily. The legacy of Biagio Settepani with forty-six original masters recipes, Caltanissetta, Lussografica, 2009. ISBN 978-88-8243-214-0.
- Introduction and photos in Mariano Deidda, Da Pessoa a Pavese, Torino, Electromantic music/Poema, 2012.
- Photos in Natale Tedesco, Villa Palagonia. Tra norma ed eccezione, Siracusa, Lombardi, 2013; 2016. ISBN 978-88-7260-166-2.
- L'incredibile storia di don Turiddu u gazzusaru. Il maestro Nuccio Daidone racconta la straordinaria vita di suo padre, Caltanissetta, Lussografica, 2015. ISBN 978-88-8243-385-7.
- Sulle ali del picchio. Ritratto di una pasticceria di successo, Pinerolo, Chiriotti, 2019. ISBN 978-88-96027-40-0.
- Caltanissetta. Racconto di una città, photos by Lillo Miccichè, texts by and with Mario Cassetti, Amedeo Falci, Fiorella Falci, Walter Guttadauria, Calogero Micciché and Marco Petrotto, presentation by Gaetano Savatteri, Caltanissetta, Lussografica, 2023. ISBN 978-88-8243-568-4.
- Caltanissetta a tavola: dulcis in primis, in Stefania D'Angelo, Cinzia Caminiti, Anna Russolillo, Leonardo Sutera Sardo, Caltanissetta. Gente culture e cucina, Ustica, Villaggio Letterario, 2024. ISBN 9791280974181.

== See also ==
Media related to Salvatore Farina (essayist) at Wikimedia Commons Salvatore Farina (essayist) at the Wikibooks Cookbook subproject

- List of Italian desserts and pastries
- Cannoli
- Cassata
