= List of number-one singles of 2022 (Portugal) =

The Portuguese Singles Chart ranks the best-performing singles in Portugal, as compiled by the Associação Fonográfica Portuguesa.

Number-one singles of 2022 in Portugal
Week	Song	Artist	Reference
1	"Love Nwantiti (Ah Ah Ah)"	CKay featuring Joeboy and Kuami Eugene	
2	"Love Nwantiti (Ah Ah Ah)"	CKay featuring Joeboy and Kuami Eugene	
3	"Love Nwantiti (Ah Ah Ah)"	CKay featuring Joeboy and Kuami Eugene	
4	"Love Nwantiti (Ah Ah Ah)"	CKay featuring Joeboy and Kuami Eugene	
5	"Love Nwantiti (Ah Ah Ah)"	CKay featuring Joeboy and Kuami Eugene	
6	"Love Nwantiti (Ah Ah Ah)"	CKay featuring Joeboy and Kuami Eugene	
7	"Bad Habits"	Ed Sheeran	
8	"Dançarina"	Pedro Sampaio and MC Pedrinho	
9	"Dançarina"	Pedro Sampaio and MC Pedrinho	
10	"Dançarina"	Pedro Sampaio and MC Pedrinho	
11	"Dançarina"	Pedro Sampaio and MC Pedrinho	
12	"Dançarina"	Pedro Sampaio and MC Pedrinho	
13	"Dançarina"	Pedro Sampaio and MC Pedrinho	
14	"Dançarina"	Pedro Sampaio and MC Pedrinho	
15	"Dançarina"	Pedro Sampaio and MC Pedrinho	
16	"Dançarina"	Pedro Sampaio and MC Pedrinho	
17	"Dançarina"	Pedro Sampaio and MC Pedrinho	
18	"Dançarina"	Pedro Sampaio and MC Pedrinho	
19	"Dançarina"	Pedro Sampaio and MC Pedrinho	
20	"Dançarina"	Pedro Sampaio and MC Pedrinho	
21	"As It Was"	Harry Styles	
22	"Dançarina"	Pedro Sampaio and MC Pedrinho	
23	"Dançarina"	Pedro Sampaio and MC Pedrinho	
24	"Dançarina"	Pedro Sampaio and MC Pedrinho	
25	"Dançarina"	Pedro Sampaio and MC Pedrinho	
26	"Dançarina"	Pedro Sampaio and MC Pedrinho	
27	"Dançarina"	Pedro Sampaio and MC Pedrinho	
28	"Dançarina"	Pedro Sampaio and MC Pedrinho	
29	"Dançarina"	Pedro Sampaio and MC Pedrinho	
30	"Dançarina"	Pedro Sampaio and MC Pedrinho	
31	"Dançarina"	Pedro Sampaio and MC Pedrinho	
32	"Dançarina"	Pedro Sampaio and MC Pedrinho	
33	"Dançarina"	Pedro Sampaio and MC Pedrinho	
34	"Dançarina"	Pedro Sampaio and MC Pedrinho	
35	"Dançarina"	Pedro Sampaio and MC Pedrinho	
36	"Ai Preto"	L7nnon, DJ Biel do Furduncinho and Bianca	
37	"Ai Preto"	L7nnon, DJ Biel do Furduncinho and Bianca	
38	"Como Tu"	Bárbara Bandeira featuring Ivandro	
39	"Como Tu"	Bárbara Bandeira featuring Ivandro	
40	"Como Tu"	Bárbara Bandeira featuring Ivandro	
41	"Como Tu"	Bárbara Bandeira featuring Ivandro	
42	"Como Tu"	Bárbara Bandeira featuring Ivandro	
43	"Quevedo: Bzrp Music Sessions, Vol. 52"	Bizarrap and Quevedo	
44	"Quevedo: Bzrp Music Sessions, Vol. 52"	Bizarrap and Quevedo	
45	"Quevedo: Bzrp Music Sessions, Vol. 52"	Bizarrap and Quevedo	
46	"Quevedo: Bzrp Music Sessions, Vol. 52"	Bizarrap and Quevedo	
47	"Quevedo: Bzrp Music Sessions, Vol. 52"	Bizarrap and Quevedo	
48	"Quevedo: Bzrp Music Sessions, Vol. 52"	Bizarrap and Quevedo	
49	"Quevedo: Bzrp Music Sessions, Vol. 52"	Bizarrap and Quevedo	
50	"Como Tu"	Bárbara Bandeira featuring Ivandro	
51	"Let Go"	Central Cee	
52	"All I Want for Christmas Is You"	Mariah Carey	

== See also ==
- List of number-one albums of 2022 (Portugal)
