= Leva-me aos Fados =

Studio album by Ana Moura
- Released: 12 October 2009
- Recorded: 5 August – 1 October 2009 at World Village Studios (Lisbon, Portugal)
- Genres: Fado, acoustic, folk
- Length: 49:28 (standard edition); 56:56 (deluxe edition)
- Label: World Village
- Producers: Custódio Castelo; Jorge Fernando; Fernando Nunes; René Goiffon (executive)

Ana Moura chronology
| Para Além da Saudade (2007) | Leva-me aos Fados (2009) | Desfado (2012) |

Singles from Leva-me aos Fados
- 1. "Leva-me aos Fados" Released: 12 November 2009; 2. "Caso Arrumado" Released: 23 November 2009; 3. "Não é Um Fado Normal" Released: 27 December 2009; 4. "Rumo ao Sul" Released: 20 February 2010; 5. "Como Uma Núvem No Céu" Released: 9 March 2010

Leva-me aos Fados (in English: Take Me To The Fados) is the fourth album by Portuguese fado singer Ana Moura, the successor to the multi-award-winning "Para Além da Saudade" (2007). Leva-me aos Fados features participations of José Mário Branco, Lisbon Bagpipes, Manuela de Freitas, Amélia Muge and Toze Brito. Like its predecessors, has the production of Jorge Fernando.

Moura became interested in collaborating with Jorge Fernando again. Together they developed a number of songs for the album, but the basis of the development was Filipe Larsen's demos. Moura had a number of songs written down for the album, which amazed Fernando. They had intensive discussions among themselves before recording a song. Later, Moura recalled that most of the songs on the album were autobiographical in many respects. However, according to her this was not intentional and happened while she was in the process of developing the album.

Five singles were released from the album, "Leva-me aos Fados", "Caso Arrumado", "Não é um fado Normal", "Rumo ao Sul" and "Como uma Núvem no Céu". Ana Moura performed a few concerts in Europe after the album's release, to promote its sales. The album has been very well received by critics and it has also been a big commercial success.

== Background ==
In "Leva-me aos fados" Ana Moura harnesses the wind and grows in proportion to time, sure her longtime producer, Jorge Fernando, gives a help, especially in the composition of most of the 15 songs in this album. Custodio Castelo, the 12-string guitar, and bassist Philip Larsen are part of the band. José Mário Branco is one of the album developers. At the time of deviation of the album, Ana Moura is right to warn that the song accompanied by Bagpipes of Lisbon 'Não é Um Fado Normal', because it gives voice to a happy marriage between fado and folk, with some classic furnishings of old music. Ana Moura also recorded a version of a theme of Alfredo Carpinteiro, called "Fado das águas". With the recognition of criticism also came the recognition from her peers and in 2009, Ana Moura received the Award for Best Artist Amalia. She stepped over 300 different stages in their last tour, she visited dozens of countries on several continents and was the focus of attention in 2010 when the Press French realized a purposeful trip to see Prince singing in Paris.

== Composition and recording ==
"Well, at the beginning I wasn't really excited about a new recording, but Fernando coniviced me and came up with a song called "Leva-me aos Fados" to be released as the lead single. After that, i got really excited and than we started writing lyrics together and recording demos for them"
- comment by Ana Moura

Moura began writing lyrics for the album in 2009 together with Jorge Fernando. Moura was constantly writing down words, exploring the form and meaning of sentences. She had written lyrics before, but called them "safe, just neatly rhymed words and that's that". For the album, she took inspiration from her parents and her own experiences as a celebrity. Moura initially had a hard time embracing her past, looking back on it as a time of pain and confused embarrassment. Confronting her past helped her improve her confidence; she said "it was like I'd climbed Serra da Estrela, or jumped out of a plane. So many things that I had avoided for so long were right there". By the end of 2009, Moura collaborated with members of the production. She first met with Costódio Castelo at his home. Filipe Larsen later sent her a demo of "Rumo ao Sul", which she loved, stating "it was so refreshing to hear something so different from what I had been working on. To have something so fresh come in that somebody else had been working on and taken control of, was a nice break for me." Moura gave him another two sets of lyrics. He took parts from each set and blended them together to create the album's lead single "Leva-me aos fados". The album became the first release to contain songs solely written by Jorge Fernando and Moura. Fernando composed the song "Caso Arrumado" on a grand guitar; additional instruments were added during production. He wrote dozens of songs with various producers over a two-month period, which many of them remain unreleased. After a set of lyrics were completed, she would record a vocal demo and evaluate the song's potential. Moura had greater freedom to make the album sound as she wanted it to and she had totally creative control over the project. At first she believed that the album contained too many musical styles, but changed her mind, stating, "I thought, partly to justify it to myself, but mainly because it's the truth, that if I had a whole album that sounded like "Não é Um Fado Normal", or a whole album that sounded like "Rumo ao Sul", it would be a lie, because I'm all over the place as a person".

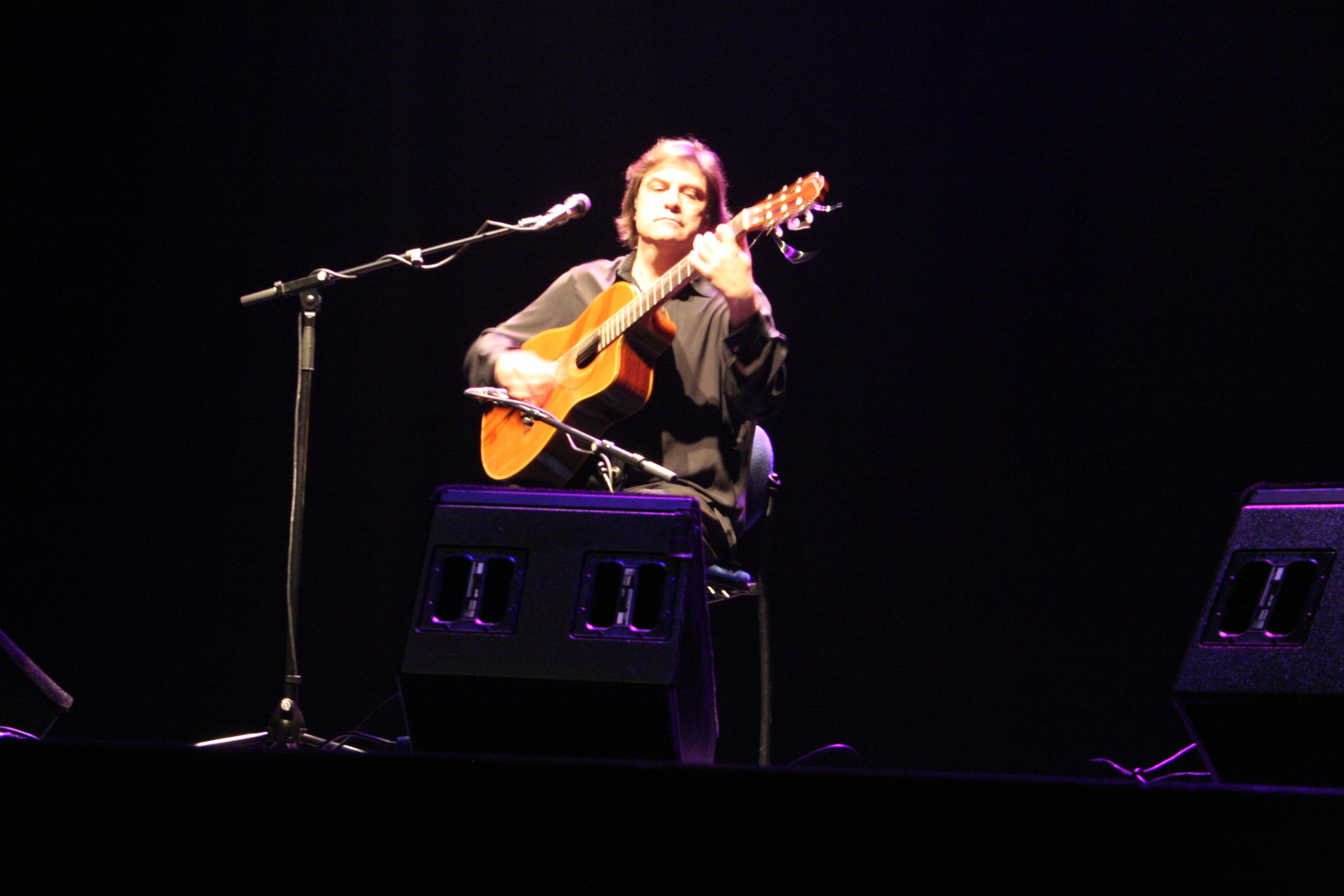
The producer Jorge Fernando

In mid 2009, Moura began recording demos at World Village studios in Lisbon, Portugal. The demos consisted of Moura's lyrical ideas over various backing tracks. The demos were later rearranged and real instruments were added to replace the samples or keyboards initially emulating them. All string and orchestral arrangements were recorded at World Village studios in Lisbon by Ana Moura and Jorge Frenando. The album was mixed at the studios by Jorge Fernando. The recording of "Leva-me aos Fados" took nearly three months, becoming the longest period of time Moura had worked on a project. Fernando later explained that the album took a few time to record "due to the pure perfectionism of all creativicty involved". Ana Moura said: "I think that fado is not only play music, people need to sing and listen as well, but as the Portuguese people say, "it happens." And fado is only fate if it happens, otherwise, it is not. And it happens when there is poetry, good music, heart in mouth and mouth in the hearts of those who sing, and feeling and emotion and longing shared with the public". In an interview to IOL Music, Ana Moura also spoke of the "very positive" balance sheet that made the launch of "Para Além Da Saudade", praising the fact that the disc has reached the platinum mark, at a time when the music was going through a very difficult period. But the singer lamented that there are radio stations that continue to leave the fado of out of their programmes, she said: "Any Portuguese radio station should "pass" fado because it's our music and because everyone in the entire world loves fate."

== Music and lyrics ==
In this work, we can also find musical styles somewhat different from those that are presented in her previous albums. This album has the participation of new sounds, including the folk and acoustic music, which enrich the album a lot. On track number 7 we hear the ballad "Rumo ao Sul", where we find a mixture of different styles such as fado and acoustic, which made this track, one of the best songs on the album, the single was released as the fourth single of the album. As for the track number 15, "Não é um Fado Normal" we can hear a faint sound of fado and a little mingled of folk in the song, making it one of the prettiest songs included on the album, and it was released as the second single. Ana Moura took the liberty of mixing the styles already mentioned earlier, (folk and acoustic), styles that bring the album a sound more complex, but serene and beautiful. "Recording this album has been really hard but fun. We have a lot of new styles mixed with fado here, like acoustic or folk. Songs like "Rumo ao Sul" and "Não é um Fado Normal" are my favourite songs from the album, because they represent a lot of myself. I Think this album is a bit different from my previously records." "Leva-me Aos Fados" is a traditional Portuguese fado music written by Jorge Fernando, tell us about a woman searching for love, waiting, sitting at a table in a cafe in Lisbon. "Como uma Nuvem no Ceu", written by Toze Brito, is also a traditional fado song. Talks about a hopeless love, in which a woman tries to start all over again with his lover. "Por Minha Conta" was written by Fernando. The ballad is based on a story about a lonely woman. "A Penumbra", written by Jorge Fernando, tell us about a woman in connection with thoughts. "Caso Arrumado", written in partnership with Manuela de Freitas and Pedro Rodriguez, talks to us about a love of husband and wife divorced. "Talvez Depois", written by Fernando and Jorge Custódio Castelo, tells about a problematic love, when a woman asks the man to "give a time" to the relationship. "Rumo Ao Sul", a contemporary fado, written by Jorge Fernando Viana and Carlos, talks about a woman who escapes to follow her dreams. "Fado das Águas", written by Mario Raínho Marcceneiro and Alfredo, talks about, in general, water and love. "Fado Vestido de Fado" is a traditional fado song, this song talks about people's feelings. "Crítica da Pura Da Razão" is also a traditional fado song, this song talks about the reason of love. "De Quando Em Vez", written by Maria Dos Anjos, talks about a man who refuses to love his wife. "Fado das Mágoas" was written by Jorge Fernando. This songs peaks about a woman who asks for help and nobody is listening her. "Águas Passadas", also written by Jorge Fernando, is a song that talks about the history of women. "Que Dizer De Nos", written by Jorge Fernando, this song tells about a forbidden love. "Não é Um Fado Normal", written by Muge, talks about a different kind of fado.

== Release and promotion ==
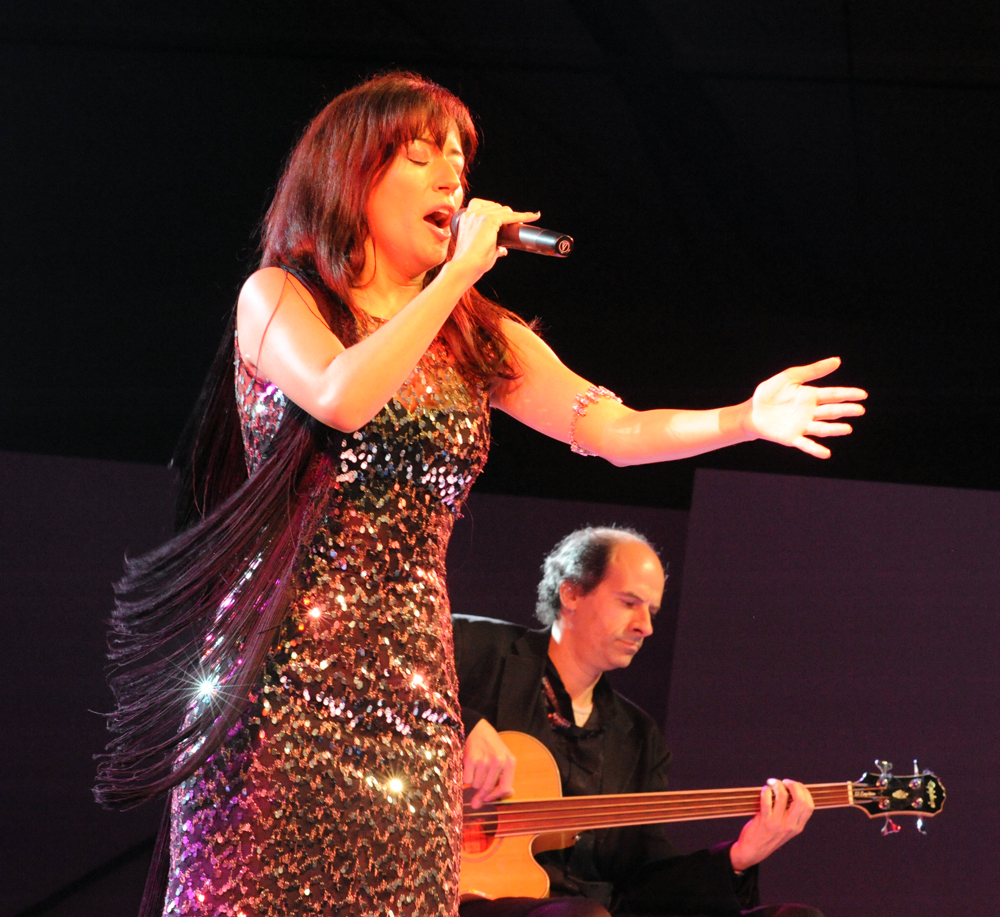
Ana Moura in Warszawa, Poland in September 2009

The album was released during the month of October 2009 by Farol in most European countries. In July 2009 on Ana Moura's Official Site was announced: "Still no release date announced, Ana Moura is preparing a new album to be released this year. Ana Moura in the shows has followed essentially the alignment of her latest album, "Para Além da Saudade". Ana Moura said: "I won't release "Para além da saudade" again. The new album should hit stores this autumn", she said in an interview with SIC. "It is certain that the two [Ana Moura and Prince] are working on a project together", said the editor of Universal Music to "JN". Ana Moura is still one of the voices of the new album from The Rolling Stones project, the work led by saxophonist and musical director of the Rolling Stones, Tim Ries. In the "Stones World", the Portuguese singer interprets the themes "Brown Sugar" and "No Expectations", later sung alive and in duet with Mick Jagger in 2007 during the concert by the band in the Alvalade XXI Stadium. The promotion of the album was presented live in 20 and 21 October 2009, first at the Casa da Música in Porto, than at The Tivoli in Lisbon. Ana Moura also went on a tour in 2009/2010, she made shows in Açores, Angra do Heroísmo, Eidhoven, Zwolle and Santarém.

The title of the new album by Ana Moura, announces a lightness of spirit and a contextualization of the Portuguese genre outside the country. And so does Ana Moura to the album, which shows the melancholy soul more race, in which sings a lament more angry than a contemplative acceptance of the moments of life. In the cover for the standard edition, we can see the face of ana Moura shown in black and white with letters saying: "Leva-me aos Fados: Ana Moura". The cover for the deluxe edition is the same, without the letters. Both of the photographs were shot by Paulo Segadães.

== Singles ==
"Leva-me Aos Fados", the lead single of the album, was released on 12 November 2009 in Portugal. A music video was produced for the song, in the music video, we can see Ana Moura standing in a dark room with men playing the Portuguese guitar while Moura sings. The second single of the album was "Caso Arrumado", released on 23 November 2010, but it didn't get the "people's attention". In its music video we can see Moura singing in a dark room like in the previous music video, in the other hand, the room is full of white lights. "Não é um Fado Normal" was released as the third single of the album, on 27 December 2009. In the music video we also have the same idea, but this time, the background vocals also appear. The fourth single, "Rumo ao Sul", released at 20 February 2010, became Ana Moura's most commercial single since "Os Buzios", released in 2007. The song charted at number one in Portuguese Charts and a music video was produced of it. The music video is basecly like "Leva-me aos Fados" music video. "Como Uma Nuvem no Céu", was released as the fifth single of the album on 9 March 2010. It was sung a lot of times on TV Shows and it became a charted song.

== Reception ==
=== Commercial performance ===
When released, the album peaked at number 2 on Portugal Albums Top 30 chart and staid there for 53 consecutive weeks. "Leva-me aos Fados" is already a Gold Record, having old 10,000 units by the end of the year of 2009, and promised to keep the legacy of multi-platinum "Para Além da Saudade". According to Expressoes Lusitanas Magazine, the album as sold 20,000 units to date and was certified platinum in Portugal. On 23 May 2010, the "Golden Globes" awards begun with the apresentation of Bárbara Guimarães, who presented the four nominated persons: Ana Moura, Carminho, David Fonseca and Rodrigo Leão for the "Best Individual Performer" award and Ana Moura won.

=== Critical reception ===
Professional ratings
Review scores
| Source | Rating |
|---|---|
| Allmusic | 4/5 stars |
| Amazon.com | (favorable) |
| DiscoDigital | (very favorable) |
| IOL Música | 3/5 stars |
| Music Review | (very favorable) |
| O Interior | 3/5 stars |
| PopMatters | (8/10) |
| Rhapsody | (favorable) |
| Seattlepi | (very favorable) |

The album met with positive reviews, it was very well received by critics. Allmusic gave the album a rating of 4 out of 5 stars and said: "a 12-string Portuguese guitar, a conventional six-string guitar, a bass, and her achingly lovely voice belting out fados both new and old in a style that draws deeply on tradition while incorporating subtle melodic and rhythmic innovations in a seamless, unprepossessing way. What's newest and most modern about her songs is the lyrical shift; where older songs from the fado tradition reflect the more subservient role of women in earlier Portuguese society, the contemporary compositions that Moura sings are informed by the greater independence women enjoy today. "In matters of the heart," Moura says, "we face our feelings in different ways and the ways we tell our story are different." The feelings themselves are still pretty much the same, however. Songs like "A Penumbra," "De Quando em Vez," and "Leva-me aos Fados" all deal with the particular brand of romantic longing that is particular to this genre: a dark and bittersweet sense of loss and regret. The recurring theme is not "I love you" or "Please love me," but instead something along the lines of "Our love will never be possible, so I'm going to stand in this smoky bar and sing my heartache." Every song on this album is gorgeous and richly emotional without being bombastically emotive, and the rhythmic and thematic experiments. A tango rhythm here, a strutting and defiant backbeat there—only serve to deepen and enrich the tradition to which Ana Moura is clearly devoted.". Amazon gave a positive review to the album and said: "Moura communicates world-weary, indomitable courage spiced with a risqué tang of dark passion that hurts so good". DiscoDigital gave a very positive review commenting that "the album is absolutely gorgeous, Ana Moura sings like she never sung before. The musical direction is perfect, Overall, the album is great from the beginning to the end". IOL Música gave the album a rating of 3 out of 5 stars calling it "a smooth sweet fado album". Music Review gave the album a positive review and said: "You may not speak any Portuguese or know the first thing about fado music, but that shouldn't stop you from appreciating Ana Moura's recording "Leva-Me aos Fados". This is a wonderful recording of beautiful and haunting music that won't fail to touch your heart. If you've forgotten what true passion feels like, this will serve as a timely reminder". O Interior gave the album a rating of 3 out of 5 calling it "a great original album of fado". PopMatters gave a rating of 8 out of 10 stars, saying: "Overall, though, this is another excellent showcase for Moura's art, with at least half of the album's tracks standing out as classics. It will be exciting to experience what the singer does with these new additions to her repertoire when she takes them on tour. As for the potential Prince collaboration, we will have to see whether fate wishes it to be or not". RateYourMusic was less favorable and gave the album a rating of 3.5 out of 5 stars. Rhapsody gave the album a favorable review and said: "she's found a way to make fado contemporary and engaging. In the album format, fado can feel slow and emotionally monotone – what was romantic becomes downright depressing after 10 songs. But she combats that with a selection of lively, short (two-minute!) songs that even hide hooks in their velvet folds". Seattlepi gave a positive review to the album and said: "Moura exhibits not only wonderful range as a singer, but control as well. There is no strain to be heard when she holds a note or as she goes up and down the scale. Unlike so many popular singers who attempt to make what they are doing sound difficult in order to impress us, there is a glorious ease in the way she moves through a song".

== Track listing ==
Standard edition
| No. | Title | Writer(s) | Length |
|---|---|---|---|
| 1. | "Leva-me aos Fados" | Fernando | 3:00 |
| 2. | "Como Uma Núvem No Céu" | Brito | 3:10 |
| 3. | "Por minha conta" | Fernando | 3:31 |
| 4. | "A Penumbra" | Fernando | 2:44 |
| 5. | "Caso Arrumado" | DeFreitas, Rodrigues | 2:22 |
| 6. | "Talvez Depois" | Castelo, Fernando | 3:16 |
| 7. | "Rumo ao Sul" | Fernando, Viana | 3:51 |
| 8. | "Fado das Águas" | Marceneiro, Rainho | 3:15 |
| 9. | "Fado vestido de Fado" | Murício, Rainho | 2:32 |
| 10. | "Crítica de razão pura" | Guedes, Traditional | 2:56 |
| 11. | "De quando em vez" | Anjos, Rainho | 4:00 |
| 12. | "Fado das Mágoas" | David, Fernado | 2:44 |
| 13. | "Águas Passadas" | Branco, Fernando | 4:08 |
| 14. | "Que dizer de nós" | Fernando, Moura | 4:42 |
| 15. | "Não é Um Fado Normal" | Muge | 4:23 |

Digipak deluxe edition
| No. | Title | Writer(s) | Length |
|---|---|---|---|
| 16. | "Esta Noite" | Fernando, Marceneiro | 3:05 |
| 17. | "Na Palma da Mão" | Fernando | 3:17 |

== Personnel ==
- Source: Allmusic
- Ana Moura – Lead vocals
- Custódio Castelo – Arranger, producer
- Karin Elsener – Graphic design
- Jorge Fernando – Guitar, arranger, producer
- René Goiffon - Executive producer
- Filipe Larsen – Guitar (bass)
- João Pedro Moreira – Graphic design
- Fernando Nunes – Producer, engineer, mastering, mixing
- Sónia Pessoa – Make-up
- Cláudia Rodrigues – Stylist
- Paulo Segadães – Photography
- Ana Sousa Hair – Stylist

== Charts ==
| Chart (2009/2010) | Peak position |
|---|---|
| Portugal Albums Top 30 | 2 |

== Release history ==
| Region | Date | Label | Format |
|---|---|---|---|
| Portugal | 12 October 2009 | World Village | CD |
| Europe | 14 October 2009 | World Village | CD |
| United Kingdom | 18 October 2009 | World Village | CD |
| Germany | 21 October 2009 | World Village | CD |
