= Mariano Deidda =

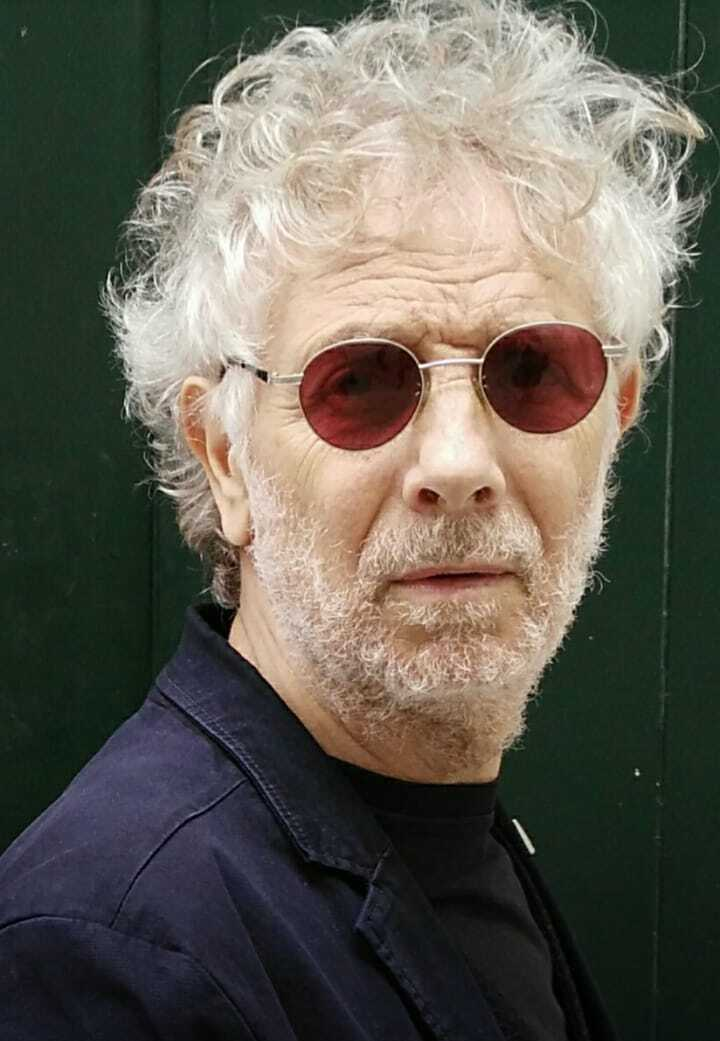
- Mariano Deidda

Background information
- Born: Mariano Deidda; Iglesias, Sardinia, Italy
- Genres: Jazz, singer-songwriter
- Occupation: Singer-songwriter
- Label: Valentim de Carvalho
- Website: www.marianodeidda.com

Mariano Deidda (born 1961) is an Italian singer, musician and songwriter.

== Musical style and work ==
He has usually been described by the Italian press as a "singer-poet", for having dedicated most of his records to setting to music the poems and texts of important writers, in particular Fernando Pessoa. Deidda has dedicated several records to this Portuguese poet and, because of this choice, he regularly publishes and performs live in Portugal, as well as in Italy and other countries.

His peculiar and systematic artistic proposal, which combines literature, jazz and his songwriting style, has been presented and/or awarded in the context of important international events, such as, among others, the 1998 Lisbon World Exposition and Le Festival du Poeme Chanté organised by UNESCO in Beirut (Lebanon) in 2006.

During his career, he has collaborated on his records with musicians such as Miroslav Vitous (Weather Report), Camané, Mafalda Arnauth and Celina Pereira, among other international artists.

In addition to records dedicated to Fernando Pessoa (through the Italian translations of Antonio Tabucchi), he has made other records singing the verses and texts of the Italian writers Grazia Deledda, Luigi Pirandello (both winners of the Nobel Prize in Literature) and Cesare Pavese.

== Discography ==
- 1986 – Quattro canzoni per ricominciare (Marvel Records, MD 9101) (EP)
- 1997 – L'era dei replicanti (Pilgrim Fathers Records, Zelda/Warner/Sony Music, ZLA 489387–2)
- 2001 – Deidda interpreta Pessoa (Lusogram/Sette Ottavi/Warner, 10013)
- 2003 – Deidda interpreta Pessoa – Nel mio spazio interiore (Sette Ottavi/Warner, SOZLD 004003)
- 2005 – Deidda interpreta Pessoa – L'incapacità di pensare (Sette Ottavi/Warner, SOZLD 018005)
- 2007 – Deidda canta Grazia Deledda – Rosso Rembrandt (Promo Music/Egea, PM CD 011)
- 2011 – Deidda canta Pavese – Un paese ci vuole (Electromantic Music, POE 1950)
- 2012 - Deidda canta Pavese – Un paese ci vuole with book Da Pessoa a Pavese, così lontani, così vicini, introduction and photos by Salvatore Farina (Electromantic Music)
- 2013 – Mariano Deidda canta Pessoa – Mensagem (Zanetti Records/Maracash-Self, 002)
- 2016 – Mariano Deidda canta Pessoa – Mensagem – Edizione portoghese (Valentim de Carvalho)
- 2016 – Pessoa sulla strada del jazz (Valentim de Carvalho, 0519–2)
- 2020 – Deidda canta Deledda. Edição especial (Valentim de Carvalho)
- 2020 – Deidda canta Pavese. Special edition (Machiavelli Music)
- 2022 – Faust – Fernando Pessoa (Valentim de Carvalho)
- 2025 – Mariano Deidda canta Pirandello - Girgenti (VREC Music Label)
