= Casa Guilhermina =

Studio album by Ana Moura
- Released: 11 November 2022
- Studio: Ana Moura's house
- Genres: Fado, Worldbeat
- Length: 46:55
- Label: Independent
- Producers: Ana Moura, Pedro da Linha, Pedro Mafama, Conan Osíris e João Bessa

Ana Moura chronology
Moura (2015)	Casa Guilhermina (2022)

Singles from Casa Guilhermina
- 1. "Andorinhas" Released: 30 April 2021; 2. "Jacarandá" Released: 25 June 2021; 3. "Agarra em Mim" Released: 13 May 2022; 4. "Arraial Triste" Released: 21 October 2022; 5. "Mázia" Released: 8 August 2023

Casa Guilhermina is the seventh studio album by Ana Moura. Released on 11 November 2022, the album topped the national sales chart and was named as one of the albums of the year by various reputable Portuguese publications.

== Production and recording ==
=== Split with Universal ===
After several years of continuous touring, Ana Moura entered the studio in 2019 with her usual team and American producer Emile Haynie to record the successor to the multi-platinum album Moura, released in 2015. After recording the basics of the album in Portugal, the producer returned to the United States to continue working on the album but stopped responding to contacts. The album was intended to be a showcase for a new international tour planned for 2020, but it did not happen due to the COVID-19 pandemic.

The return to the studio for the album's recording triggered a deep crisis of sadness and musical identity in the artist. Confronted with Haynie's ghosting, the artist realized she was frustrated with the wear and tear of her career. The process led to the artist's disengagement from her longtime record label, Universal, and the agency Sons Em Trânsito, where Vasco Sacramento had been her manager for about twelve years.

From the initial recordings, the only song to make it to the final version of the album was "Nossa Senhora das Dores", whose lyrics served as an emotional anchor for Moura during this phase. Written by José Luís Gordo, the song was originally popularized by Maria da Fé, who is Ana Moura's godmother in fado. This version was recorded almost spontaneously: during a break in the recordings, Moura started singing the song in an unusual interpretation, in a lamenting way, eventually asking Ângelo Freire to accompany her on the Portuguese guitar.

=== COVID-19's impact ===
At that time, Ana Moura started attending some nightscene events in Lisbon organized by Príncipe Discos and Enchufada, both influential record labels of African influence. Moura had already shown music from some artists of these labels to Haynie, but she recognized that it was at these events that she realized she was looking for a revolution in her sound. It was in this circuit that she crossed paths with Conan Osiris, with whom she collaborated on the album from the beginning, along with the producer Pedro da Linha and the artist Pedro Mafama, names she ultimately chose for the development of her artistic vision, aiming to distance herself from the more conventional fado she had done until then. After an initial informal approach, where each artist maintained other projects, the three artists ended up spending periods of the pandemic lockdown at Ana Moura's invitation, and the album's composition process began.

Casa Guilhermina was produced as a collaborative effort: Ana Moura not only interpreted but also took on part of the executive co-production. Conan Osíris contributed with lyrics and other musical inputs, Pedro da Linha led the production of Moura's new electronic sound, and Pedro Mafama was responsible for the artistic and conceptual direction of the album. João Bessa was in charge of mixing and co-producing some tracks. In addition to electronic elements, the album incorporates a range of other genres, especially rhythms of African origin like semba, kizomba, and funaná, but also other traditional Portuguese inspirations, such as fandango. These influences, along with the album's title and one of the cover photos, serve as a tribute to the life of her Angolan grandmother, Guilhermina, whose influence on the artist's life was significant.

The first hints about the new sonic direction of Ana Moura's work emerged on January 3, 2020, with the release of "Vinte Vinte," a single in collaboration with Conan Osíris. Produced by Branko, the song was commissioned by fashion designer Luís Carvalho, who challenged Moura to compose electronic music for one of his fashion shows. The track was re-released in 2021 as "Vinte Vinte (Pranto)," accompanied by a music video. Although it didn't make it onto the new album, the song served as an introduction to the close collaboration Moura developed with Osíris and Mafama, who had the original idea for the video.

== Release and promotion ==
The album's release was preceded by four singles. On April 30, 2021, "Andorinhas" was released as the lead single of the album. It was followed by "Jacarandá," released in July of the same year, a song honoring her late friend Prince. The third single, "Agarra em Mim," was released almost a year later, in May 2022, featuring Mafama as a guest artist. "Arraial Triste," the last single before the album's arrival, was released on October 21, 2022, coinciding with the announcement of the album's release date, title, and cover. On March 17, 2023, she released an official music video for "Nossa Senhora das Dores" to celebrate the beginning of her Casa Guilhermina Tour the day after. On August 8, 2023, she released "Mázia" as the final single off of the album, a song honoring her late cousin Cláudia, alongside a music video shot in Angola. A remix of "Mázia", produced by Vanyfox, was later released on September 1, 2023.

== Reception ==
Professional ratings
Review scores
Source	Rating
Mojo	4/5 stars
Time Out	5/5 stars
Público	3.5/5 stars

Even before the album's release in October 2022, Ana Moura received the Golden Globe in the Best Song category for the song "Andorinhas". On the 2022 edition of the PLAY - Portuguese Music Awards, she won the award for Best Female Artist, and "Andorinhas" was nominated for Song of the Year and won Best Music Video. On the album release day, The Guardian named her as "One to Watch".

Casa Guilhermina debuted at number one on the Portuguese albums chart, holding the top position for several weeks.

The album received generally positive reviews from critics: Time Out magazine gave it a five-star rating; the newspaper Público gave it three and a half stars. It was considered the best Portuguese album of 2022 by the team at BLITZ. On Antena 3, it made it to the year-end lists of the presenters João André Oliveira, Luís Oliveira, and Marta Rocha. It also made it to the year-end lists for the specialized site Rimas e Batidas and for the Observador, chosen by journalist Luís Freitas Branco. Tozé Brito described it as a "fracturing" title in Portuguese music.

Casa Guilhermina was considered the big winner of the 2023 edition of the PLAY - Portuguese Music Awards. The album won in the Best Album category and received the Critic's Award; Ana Moura was also recognized as the Best Female Artist. The single "Agarra Em Mim" was nominated for the Best Song category, but the award ultimately went to Ivandro. She was nominated for Best Artist at the 2023 Golden Globes, but lost to A Garota Não.

=== Year-end lists ===
Select year-end rankings of Casa Guilhermina
Publication	List	Rank	Ref.
BLITZ	The Best Portuguese Albums of 2022	1	
Antena 3	João André Oliveira's Best Portuguese Albums of 2022	—N/a	
Antena 3	Luís Oliveira's Best Portuguese Albums of 2022	—N/a	
Antena 3	Marta Rocha's Best Portuguese Albums of 2022	—N/a	
Rimas e Batidas	Best Portuguese Albums of 2022	—N/a	
Observador	Best Albums of 2022	—N/a	

=== Accolades ===
Awards and nominations for Casa Guilhermina
Organization	Year	Category	Result	Ref.
PLAY - Portuguese Music Awards	2023	Best Album	Won	
PLAY - Portuguese Music Awards	2023	Critic's Choice	Won	

== Track listing ==
Casa Guilhermina track listing
No.	Title	Lyrics	Music	Length
1.	"Janela Escancarada"	Ana Moura, Kalaf, Pedro Mafama, Toty Sa'Med	Alberto Fialho Janes	2:43
2.	"Mázia"	Ana Moura	Ana Moura	3:26
3.	"Calunga"	Lourenço Da Fonseca Barbosa	Lourenço Da Fonseca Barbosa	3:28
4.	"Birim Birim (Interlúdio)"	Liceu Vieira Dias	Liceu Vieira Dias	1:23
5.	"Andorinhas"	Ana Moura, Pedro Mafama	Pedro da Linha	2:58
6.	"Corridinha"	Luís José Martins, Pedro Da Silva Martins	Luís José Martins, Pedro Da Silva Martins	2:20
7.	"Classe"	Conan Osíris, Fado Zé Negro	Conan Osíris, Fado Zé Negro	2:30
8.	"Fandango (Interlúdio)"	Ana Moura, Luis Estudante, Tó Serraó	Ana Moura, Luis Estudante, Tó Serraó	1:05
9.	"Arraial Triste"	Ana Moura, Pedro Mafama	Pedro da Linha	3:07
10.	"Minha Mãe (Interlúdio)"	Ana Moura		1:32
11.	"Jacarandá"	Ana Moura, Pedro Mafama	Pedro da Linha	3:33
12.	"Sozinha Lá Fora"	Ana Moura	Ana Moura	3:56
13.	"Trigo"	Conan Osíris	Ana Moura	1:40
14.	"Colheita (Interlúdio) (com Conan Osíris)"	Conan Osíris	Conan Osíris	0:34
15.	"Agarra Em Mim (com Pedro Mafama)"	Ana Moura, Pedro Mafama, Conan Osíris	Ana Moura, Pedro Mafama, Conan Osíris, Pedro da Linha	3:28
16.	"Antes Que Eu Morra (Interlúdio)"	Ângelo Freire	Ângelo Freire	2:08
17.	"Estranha Forma De Vida"	Amália Rodrigues	Alfredo Marceneiro, Amália Rodrigues	3:02
18.	"Nossa Senhora Das Dores"	José Luis Gordo	Carlos Macedo	4:05
Total length:				46:55

== Charts ==
=== Weekly charts ===
Weekly chart performance of Casa Guilhermina
Chart (2022–23)	Peak position
Portuguese Albums (AFP)	1

=== Year-end charts ===
2022 year-end chart performance of Casa Guilhermina
Chart (2022)	Position
Portuguese Albums (AFP)	3

2023 year-end chart performance of Casa Guilhermina
Chart (2023)	Position
Portuguese Albums (AFP)	5

== Certifications and sales ==
Certifications for Casa Guilhermina
Region	Certification	Certified units/sales
Portugal (AFP)	Gold	7,500^{^}
^{^} Shipments figures based on certification alone.

== See also ==
- List of number-one albums of 2022
- List of number-one albums of 2023
