= Esta voz que me atravessa =

Studio album by Mafalda Arnauth
- Released: 2001
- Genre: Fado
- Label: EMI

Mafalda Arnauth chronology
Mafalda Arnauth (1999)	Esta voz que me atravessa (2001)	Encantamento (2003)

Esta Voz que me Atravessa is the second album by Portuguese fado singer Mafalda Arnauth. It was released in 2001 by EMI Valentim de Carvalho. In praise of this album, Andreas Dorschel writes: "capable of the tenderest nuances of voice, she [Mafalda Arnauth] ingeniously counterbalances them with a roughness that calls to mind fado’s subcultural origins.“

== Track listing ==
1. Esta Voz Que Me Atravessa"
2. “O Instante Dos Sentidos"
3. “Ee Não Saber Ser Loucura"
4. “Coisa Assim"
5. “Este Silêncio Que Me Corta"
6. “Até Logo, Meu Amor"
7. “Não Há Fado Que Te Resista"
8. “Lusitana"
9. “Há Noite Aqui"
10. “Ai Do Vento"
11. “Ora vai"
12. “A Casa E O Mundo"

== Personnel ==
- José Martins - direction and arrangement
- Amélia Muje - production
- José Elmiro Nunes - Fado guitar
- Paulo Paz - double bass
- Ricardo Rocha - Portuguese guitar
