= Índigo =

Studio album by Susana Félix
- Released: November 2006
- Recorded: February–September 2006; Recorded in Lisbon at "Valentim de Carvalho" studios.
- Genre: Pop
- Label: Farol
- Producer: Susana Félix, Reanto Jr.

Susana Félix chronology
Rosa e Vermelho (2002)	Índigo (2006)	Pulsação (2007)

Índigo is the third studio album by the Portuguese pop singer Susana Félix. It was recorded in 2006 and released in that same year. The lead single of the album was "Flutuo", followed by "Concilios", "Lua Na Ponte", "Sou Eu" and "Fintar a Pulsação".

== Chart performance ==
The album debuted at number one in Portuguese Albums Chart, charting higher than her previous studio album Rosa e Vermelho, and was certified Platinum in Portugal. The album was released by Farol, it was produced by Renato Jr. and Susana, and she wrote all the songs, including the bonuses. It was also one of the best-selling albums of 2006.

== Singles ==
The single "Flutuo" was the first single of the album, it was released in 2006 after the album's release and debuted at #1 in Portuguese Chart. The second single "Concilios", was not so successful as "Flutuo". It was also released in 2006. The third single, "Lua Na Ponte", was released in 2006. The fourth single was "Sou eu" and it was released in 2007. "Fintar a Pulsação" was the fifth and final single of the album, released in 2007. A second version of the single was also released in 2007 as promo single, from the álbum Pulsação, without percussion.

#	Title	Released
1.	"Flutuo"	June, 2006
2.	"Concilios"	September, 2006
3.	"Luz Na Ponte"	December, 2006
4.	"Sou Eu"	May, 2007
5.	"Fintar a Pulsação"	December, 2007

== Reception ==
=== Critical response ===
Professional ratings
Review scores
Source	Rating
ABCmusic	4.5/5 stars
A Trompa	Favorable
Edusurfa	5/5 stars
Qmusika	4/5 stars
RateYourMusic	3.5/5 stars

The album was well received by the critics. "ABCmusic" gave a rating of 4.5 out of 5 stars. The A Trompa gave a positive review and said: "A brief hearing of "Indigo" - though little repeated third album Susana Félix, revealed a very nice disc. Beautiful voice, good arrangements, all on a disc and close a pop singer made with great charm. Everything surprises." Edusurfa gave a rating of 5 out of 5, and said "the album is really good, there are beautiful songs such as "Flutuo", the first single of the album. Love her voice with the piano". Qmusika gave a rating of 4 out of 5, saying that the album has good arrangements and beautiful songs. RateYourMusic was less favorable and gave a rating of 3.5 out of 5, commenting that Índigo is a "vulgar" pop album.

=== Commercial ===
The album received a platinum certification.

== Track listing ==
1. Flutuo (Susana Félix) - 3:17
2. Concilios (Susana Félix) - 3:44
3. Lua Na Ponte (Susana Félix) - 2:56
4. Manual de Sobrevivência (Susana Félix) - 3:53
5. Sou eu (Susana Félix) - 2:47
6. Fintar a Pulsação (Susana Félix) - 3:21
7. Nasci depois (Susana Félix) - 4:04
8. (Em Cada) Momento Perfeito (Susana Félix) - 3:15
9. Subtil (Susana Félix) - 4:17

=== Bonuses ===
10. Vou-me embalando

== Personnel ==
Information retrieved from Susana's official blog.

- Renato Junior - keyboards
- Nuno Rafael - guitar
- Alexandre Frazão - drums
- Maximo Cavali - violi
- Jorge Teixeira - Portuguese guitar
- Vasco Brôco - violin
- Tózé Miranda - violin
- Jeremy Lake - violoncel
- João Cabrita - saxophone
- João Marques - fliscorne
- Jorge Ribeiro - trombone

== Charts ==
Chart (2007)	Peak position
Portuguese Albums Chart	1

== Release history ==
Region	Date	Label	Format
Portugal	2006	Farol	CD

== See also ==
- Susana Félix
