= José Eduardo Fialho Gouveia =

Portuguese television presenter

José Eduardo Fialho Gouveia is a Portuguese television presenter (Bairro Alto, RTP) and journalist (Sol). He is the son of Fialho Gouveia (1935 - 2004), also a television presenter, and Beatriz. He has a daughter whose the mother is the singer and actress Susana Félix.
