= Caso Arrumado =

Single by Ana Moura

from the album Leva-me aos Fados
- Released: November 23, 2009
- Recorded: 2009
- Genre: Fado
- Length: 2:22
- Label: World Village
- Songwriters: DeFreitas, Rodrigues
- Producer: Jorge Fernando

Ana Moura singles chronology
"'Leva-me aos Fados'" (2009)	"Caso Arrumado" (2009)	"'Não é Um Fado Normal'" (2010)

"Caso Arrumado" is a single by Ana Moura from the album Leva-me aos Fados. It was released on November 23, 2009, in Portugal.

== Recording and production ==
In 2009, Moura began recording rough demos at World Village studios in Lisbon, Portugal. The demos consisted of Moura's lyrical ideas over various backing tracks. The demos were later rearranged and real instruments were added to replace the samples or keyboards initially emulating them. All string and orchestral arrangements were recorded at World Village studios in Lisbon by Ana Moura and Jorge Fernando. The song was mixed at the studios by Jorge Fernando.

== Music video ==
In its music video we can see Moura singing in a dark room like in the previous music videos, in the other hand, the room is full of white lights.

== Official versions ==
- Album version - 2:22
- Single version - 2:22
