= Guarda-me a Vida na Mão =

Guarda-me A Vida Na Mão

Studio album by Ana Moura
- Released: 2003
- Genre: Fado
- Label: Mercury

Ana Moura chronology
Guarda-me A Vida Na Mão (2003)	Aconteceu (2004)

Guarda-me A Vida Na Mão is the first album released by fado singer Ana Moura. It was released in 2003 by Mercury Records. The album featured production and arrangements by Jorge Fernando and co-production by Fernando Nunes. Moura was accompanied by Mário Pacheco on the Portuguese guitar, Jorge Fernando on the viola and Filipe Larsen on the bass viola. The album peaked at No. 28 on the Associação Fonográfica Portuguesa chart.

== Track listing ==
1. "Guarda-Me a Vida Na Mão" (Keep My Life in Your Hand) (Jorge Fernando, Raul Ferrão) [4:00]
2. "Desculpa" (Seria Quase Voz) (Jorge Fernando) [2:28]
3. "Nasci P'ra Ser Ignorante" (I Was Born to Be Ignorant) [2:18]
4. "Sou Do Fado, Sou Fadista" (I Belong to Fado, I'm a Fadista) (Jorge Fernando) [3:26]
5. "Vou Dar De Beber À Dor" (I'll Offer Pain a Drink) [2:42]
6. "Preso Entre O Sono E O Sonho" (Caught Between Sleep and Dreams) (Jorge Fernando, Fontes Rocha) [2:53]
7. "Não Hesitava Um Segundo" (I Wouldn't Hesitate for a Moment) [3:31]
8. "Porque Teimas Nesta Dor" (Why Do You Insist on This Pain) (Carlos "Bala" Gomes) [2:08]
9. "Meu Triste, Meu Amor" (My Sad, Sad Love) (Jorge Fernando, Alfredo Marceneiro) [2:55]
10. "Endeixa" (Elegy) [2:47]
11. "Quem Vai Ao Fado" (Whoever Goes to Fado) (Jorge Fernando) [2:01]
12. "Flor De Lua" (Moon Flower) [3:12]
13. "Guitarra" (Guitar) (Jorge Fernando) [3:31]
14. "Às Vezes" (Sometimes) [3:56]
15. "Lavava No Rio Lavava" (I Went to the River to Wash) (Fontes Rocha) [3:42]
