= Encantamento =

Studio album by Mafalda Arnauth
- Released: 2003
- Genre: Fado
- Label: EMI

Mafalda Arnauth chronology
Esta voz que me atravessa (2001)	Encantamento (2003)	Talvez se Chame Saudade (2005)

Encantamento is the third album by Portuguese fado singer Mafalda Arnauth, released in 2003 on EMI Valentim de Carvalho.

== Track listing ==
1. Pode Lá Ser
2. As Fontes
3. Porque Não Oiço No Ar
4. Fado Arnauth
5. Ó Voz Da Minh’Alma
6. Cavalo À Solta
7. Eu Venho
8. Trova Escondida
9. Canção
10. Da Palma Da Minha Mão
11. Sem Limite
12. No Teu Poema
13. É Sempre Cedo
14. Bendito Fado, Bendita Gente

== Personnel ==
- Mafalda Arnauth - production
- José Elmiro Nunes - Portuguese guitar
- Luís Oliveira - arrangement, direction, fado guitar
- João Penedo - double bass
