= Moura (album) =

Studio album by Ana Moura
- Released: November 27, 2015
- Genre: Fado
- Length: 51:55
- Label: Mercury, Universal Music Portugal

Ana Moura chronology
Desfado (2012)	Moura (2015)	Casa Guilhermina (2022)

Moura is the sixth album released by fado singer Ana Moura. It was released in November 2015 by Mercury Records and Universal Music Portugal. The album peaked at No. 1 on the Associação Fonográfica Portuguesa chart.

== Track listing ==
1. "Moura Encantada" (Manuela De Freitas, Alfredo Marceneiro) [4:44]
2. "Fado Dançado" (Miguel Araújo) [2:17]
3. "Desamparo" (Márcia Santos) [3:37]
4. "Dia De Folga" (Jorge Cruz) [2:39]
5. "Lilac Wine" (James Shelton) [4:17]
6. "Ai Eu" (Luís José Martins, Pedro Da Silva Martins) [4:38]
7. "Eu Entrego" (Edu Mundo) [2:46]
8. "Agora É Que É" (Pedro Abrunhosa [3:11]
9. "Cantiga De Abrigo" (Samuel Úria) [3:55]
10. "O Meu Amor Foi Para O Brasil" (Carlos Tê) [2:52]
11. "Ninharia" (Fado Carlos Da Maia, Maria Do Rosário Pedreira) [4:18]
12. "Tens Os Olhos De Deus" (Pedro Abrunhosa) [5:19]
13. "Não Quero Nem Saber" (Kalaf Epalanga, Sara Tavares) [3:06]
14. "Moura" (José Eduardo Agualusa, Toty Sa'med) [4:16]
