= Para Além da Saudade =

Studio album by Ana Moura
- Released: 15 August 2007
- Recorded: 13 March – June 2007
- Genre: Fado
- Length: 46:55
- Label: World Village
- Producers: Custódio Castelo; Jorge Fernando; Fernando Nunes; René Goiffon (executive)

Ana Moura chronology
Aconteceu (2004)	Para Além da Saudade (2007)	Leva-me aos Fados (2009)

Singles from Para Além da Saudade
- 1. "O Fado da Procura" Released: 2007; 2. "Naõ Fui Eu" Released: 2007; 3. "Até ao Fim do Fim" Released: 2007; 4. "Os Búzios" Released: 2008; 5. "A Voz Que Conta a Nossa História" Released: 2008; 6. "Mapa do Coração" Released: 2008; 7. "Velho Anjo" Released: 2008

Professional ratings
Review scores
Source	Rating
Independente	(Favorable)
Rascunho	(Favourable)
Rate Your Music	3.5/5 stars

Para Além da Saudade is the third studio album by Portuguese fado singer Ana Moura, released on 15 August 2007 by World Village. The album featured the hit singles "Os Búzios" and "O Fado da Procura".

== Background ==
In "Para Além da Saudade", Ana Moura makes the right association between traditional Fado and "Fado Canção" and reserve us some good surprises like "E Viemos Nascidos do Mar" composed by Fausto. Amélia Muge wrote "O Fado da Procura" and from a poem of Fernando Pessoa "Vaga, no Azul Amplo Solta" she picks the title of the Album. The music of this theme was made by Patxi Andión, which sings, in duet and in Castelhano, with Ana Moura. Tim Ries, the Rolling Stones' saxophonist, composed the music for "Velho Anjo" and he plays saxophone in the theme "A Sós Com a Noite".

== Release ==
It was released in 2007 and published by World Village and Universal. Contains 15 tracks, with the opening theme, "Buzios," probably to have received the greatest emphasis. Having been released in the previous year's first live album by the artist: Coliseu, of the fados were chosen 8 (the tracks 1, 2, 5, 6, 7, 9, 11 and 12) to join the live work. At the same time, a second version came out with a DVD extra, where we can find six songs recorded alive. These themes are "Map of the Heart", "Fado of Search", "Os Búzios", "Born And Came from the Sea," "First Time" and "Alone with the Night."

=== Singles ===
The lead single of the album was "O Fado da Procura", it was released in 2007 and charted at number one at Portuguese Charts. The second single of the album was "Não Fui Eu", it was released in 2007. The third single of the album was "Até ao Fim do Fim", it was released in 2007. "Os Búzios" was released in 2008 as the fourth single of the album, it became Ana Moura's most commercial single to date. The fifth single of the album was "A Voz Que Conta a Nossa História", it was released in 2008. The sixth single of the album was "Mapa do Coração", it was released in 2008. The last single of the album was "Velho Anjo", it was released in 2008.

== Critical reception ==
The album met with favourable reviews. Rascunho gave the album a favourable review and said: "Leafing through the pages of the small book that accompanies this third record of original, never fail to jump out at you names like Faust, Amélia Muge, Patxi Andeon or Tim Reies - the latter surely the most unsuspecting strangers, but also not sounding that the oddness of names. Ana Moura's talent is unique in that call to you to make quality workers without question in the musical universe, after all the good attracts good and it materializes into something even better. And this album is irrefutable proof of this. Besides those mentioned, are already in a regular course of fado, and Custodio Castelo, Jorge Fernando, but these have the Fado is instructed to carve their names in the pages of its history. Beyond the nostalgia is a record that exudes freshness, novelty, shock. Today's ways Fado will be populating with new people, new ideas and new values. And these paths that inculcating its history, one of the most interesting is undoubtedly of treading the path outlined by Ana Moura. Here Fado is not expected, does not bode not be guessed, which makes it hard going through this adventure is almost a teenager where the unpredictability and surprise pulsate at all times. The duet with Patxi Andeon the broad theme Vacancy in blue loose proves (again) that fado does not dissolve or disenchanted when pointing in other directions, rather, reflects on one of the most distinctive and uplifting moments that this work lends nobile . This 'missing' Ana Moura appears to be young, hopeful, passionate, and beyond what is unforgettable is that feeling of happiness when lurking is a great love - "First it was a smile, then almost without warning, is the kiss that happened "... O Independente also gave the album a favourable review.

== Track listing ==
1. "Os Búzios" [The Cowrie-Shells] - Fernando - 3:36
2. "E Viemos Nascidos Do Mar" [And We Came Born from the Sea] - Dias ... - 3:04
3. "A Voz Que Conta a Nossa História" [The Voice That Tells Our Story] - Fernando, Machado - 3:14
4. "Aguas Do Sul" [Southern Waters] - Castelo, Fernando - 2:33
5. "O Fado Da Procura" [Fado of Search] - Megu, Muge - 1:44
6. "Rosa Cor de Roda" [Pink Rose] - Castelo, Fernando - 2:29
7. "Primeira Vez" [First Time] - DeBrito, Raínho - 3:23
8. "Não Fui Eu" [It Wasn't Me] - Fernando - 3:27
9. "Mapa Do Coração" [Map of the Heart] - Blanc, Guedes - 2:16
10. "Aguarda-Te ao Chegar" [Waits for You When You Arrive] - Viana, Viana - 3:22
11. "Até ao Fim Do Fim" ['Til the end of the end] - Brito - 3:53
12. "Fado das Horas Incertas" [Fado of the unknown hours] - Fernando - 2:15
13. "Vaga, No Azul Amplo Solta" [Vague, In the Wild Blue Loose] - Andion, Pessoa - 4:36
14. "Velho Anjo" [Old Angel] - Fernando, Ries - 3:05
15. "A Sós Com a Noite" [Alone with the Night] - Fernando - 3:58

== Personnel ==
- Ana Moura - Lead vocals
- Custódio Castelo - Arranger, producer
- Karin Elsener - Graphic design
- Jorge Fernando - Guitar, arranger, producer
- René Goiffon -Executive producer
- Filipe Larsen - Guitar (bass)
- João Pedro Moreira - Graphic design
- Fernando Nunes - Producer, engineer, mastering, mixing
- Sónia Pessoa - Make-up
- Cláudia Rodrigues - Stylist
- Paulo Segadães - Photography
- Ana Sousa Hair - Stylist

== Chart positions ==
Chart (2007–2009)	Peak position
Portuguese Albums (AFP)	4
