= Fialho Gouveia =

Portuguese talk show host and radio host

José Manuel Bastos Fialho Gouveia (30 April 1935 – 2 October 2004) was a Portuguese television entertainment pioneer and former radio host, having hosted Portugal's first television talk show.

Born in Montijo, the son of a railroad company employee and an elementary school teacher, Gouveia studied Romance Philology at the University of Lisbon, but dropped out for a career in radio.

Known for a 30-year career in radio and TV, Gouveia hosted Zip Zip, Portugal's first talk show, in 1969, alongside Carlos Cruz and Raúl Solnado. The show made him instantly famous and is still considered a landmark in the history of Portuguese television. Gouveia was also a popular host for other programs, namely game shows, working with Cruz behind the cameras, and became one of the mainstays of Portugal's RTP up to the early 1990s.

After being admitted to hospital in Coimbra, on 24 August 2004, for bacteria-induced respiratory and circulatory problems, Gouveia died from multiple organ failure. He was first married to Maria Helena Varela Santos (the first TV announcer in Portugal), with whom he had two children: Paulo and Maria João. Later, he married Beatriz, the mother of his third child, José Eduardo Fialho Gouveia, who is also a television presenter (Bairro Alto, RTP) and journalist (Sol).
