= Um pouco mais =

Um Pouco Mais

Studio album by Susana Félix
- Released: 1999
- Recorded: 1999
- Genre: Pop
- Label: Farol
- Producer: Reanto Jr.

Susana Félix chronology
Um Pouco Mais (1999)	Rosa e Vermelho (2002)

Singles from Um Pouco mais
- 1. "Mais Olhos (Que Barriga)" Released: 1999; 2. "Um Lugar Encantado" Released: 1999

Um Pouco Mais is the debut studio album by the Portuguese pop singer Susana Félix. It was recorded in 1999 and released in that same year. The lead single of the album was "Mais Olhos (Que Barriga)", followed by "Um Lugar Encantado".

== Conception ==
In 1999, Susana signed a contract with Farol to produce albums together with Renato Jr. Like Susana was to young to produce an album all by her own, she worked with a lot of people in the album. The album has a few cover songs, such as "Mais olhos (Que Barriga)", written by Mafalda Veiga, although most of the songs were written by Susana. The album was extremely successful in commercial terms; it peaked at number one in Portuguese charts. The album took a few months to get ready to sell in the market, and it was released in that same year.

== Singles ==
- "Mais Olhos (Que Barriga)" was the lead single of the album and it was released in 1999. This song, became the most successful single by Susana, which launched her minor career to an expanded life full of work.
- "Um Lugar Ecantado" was the second and final single taken from the album, it also became a good mark in Susana's career. it was also released in 1999.

== Reception ==
=== Critical ===
Professional ratings
Review scores
Source	Rating
ABCmusic	3.5/5 stars
RateYourMusic	2.5/5 stars

The album met with positive reviews and was well received by most critics. "ABCmusic" gave a rating of 3.5 out of 5 stars. "Rate Your Music" was less positive, giving a non-professional rating of 2.5 out of 5 stars.

== Promotion ==
In 2000, she toured the country from north to south on a tour of 40 shows.

== Track listing ==
1. Mais Olhos (Que Barriga) (Mafalda Veiga)
2. Um Lugar Encantado (Susana Félix)
3. Do Lado de Lá do Azul (Susana Félix)
4. Por Quem Caminhar (Susana Félix)
5. Enquanto Houver (Susana Félix)
6. Vôo Cego (Susana Félix)
7. Quase Feliz (Susana Félix)
8. Coisas Dispersas (Susana Félix)
9. Deixa-me Lá Ficar (Susana Félix)
10. Tocar o Céu (Susana Félix)

== Personnel ==
Information retrieved from Susana's official blog.

- Renato Junior - keyboards
- Nuno Rafael - guitar
- Alexandre Frazão - drums
- Maximo Cavali - violi
- Jorge Teixeira - Portuguese guitar
- Vasco Brôco - violin
- Tózé Miranda - violin
- Jeremy Lake - violoncel
- João Cabrita - saxophone
- João Marques - fliscorne
- Jorge Ribeiro - trombone

== Charts ==
Chart (1999)	Peak Position
Portuguese Albums Chart	1

== Release history ==
Region	Date	Label	Format
Portugal	1999	Farol	CD
