= Rosa e Vermelho =

Studio album by Susana Félix
- Released: 2002
- Recorded: 2001
- Genre: Pop
- Label: Farol
- Producer: Reanto Jr.

Susana Félix chronology
Um pouco mais (1999)	Rosa e Vermelho (2002)	Índigo (2006)

Singles from Rosa e Vermelho
- 1. "Pó de Amar" Released: 2001; 2. "Ficou" Released: 2002; 3. "Luz de Presença" Released: 2002

Rosa e Vermelho is the second studio album by the Portuguese pop singer Susana Félix. It was recorded in 2001 and released in 2002. The lead single of the album was "Pó de Amar", followed by "Ficou" and "Luz de Presença".

== Background ==
After her debut in 1999, Susana returned with a new album called "Rosa e Vermelho". The album was produced by Renato Jr. like in the previous album and recorded during the year of 2001 and was released in 2002 by Farol. The album features the hit singles "Pó de Amar" and "Ficou", both released in 2002. The album received negatives reviews from critics, and said the album is a crappy comparing with her debut, however it had a big commercial success, it peaked at number four at Portuguese Album Charts.

== Singles ==
The lead single of the album was "Pó de Amar", which had a big commercial success, it peaked at number twelve at Portuguese Singles Chart. However the rest of the singles, "Ficou" and "Luz de Presença" didn't get a lot attention from fans. "Ficou" debuted at number twenty at Portuguese Singles Charts and "Luz de presença" did not chart.

== Reception ==
=== Critical ===
Professional ratings
Review scores
Source	Rating
ABCmusic	3/5 stars
Edusurfa	2/5 stars
RateYourMusic	2/5 stars

Critics to the album were generally mixed. "ABCmusic" gave a rating of 3 out of five stars. "Edusurfa" was less positive and gave a rating of 2 out of five stars and called the album: "horrible". Renatus96 from Rate Your Music gave a rating of 2 out of five stars, and said: "A little bit different, however, its a crappy comparing with her debut, it is not successful as "Um Pouco Mais". The album features some kind of beautiful songs, such as "Pó de Amar" or "Ficou", but nothing of especial. There's also a video featuring on the album, but is just crappy as the rest of album."

== Track listing ==
1. Dá-Me a Tua Alma (Susana Félix) - 5:00
2. Pó de Amar (Susana Félix) - 3:01
3. Ficou (Susana Félix) - 4:36
4. Deixa-Te Voar (Susana Félix) - 2:26
5. Longe (Demais) (Susana Félix) - 3:59
6. Luz de Presença (Susana Félix) - 4:38
7. Fármaco de Encantar (Susana Félix) - 3:40
8. Rosa Ou Vermelho (Susana Félix) - 4:22
9. Já Não Me Iludo (Susana Félix) - 1:47
10. Se És Capaz (Susana Félix) - 4:36
11. Irrecusável Ser (Susana Félix) - 3:46

== Personnel ==
Information retrieved from Susana's official blog.

- Renato Junior - (keyboards)
- Nuno Rafael - (guitar)
- Alexandre Frazão - (drums)
- Maximo Cavali - (violi)
- Jorge Teixeira - (Portuguese guitar)
- Vasco Brôco - (violin)
- Tózé Miranda - (violin)
- Jeremy Lake - (violoncel)
- João Cabrita - (saxophone)
- João Marques - (fliscorne)
- Jorge Ribeiro - (trombonne)

== Charts ==
Chart (2002)	Peak Position
Portuguese Albums Chart	4

== Release history ==
Region	Date	Label	Format
Portugal	2002	Farol	CD
