= Mafalda Arnauth =

Portuguese fado singer (born 1974)

- Born: October 4, 1974 (age 51)
- Origin: Lisbon, Portugal
- Genres: Fado

Mafalda Arnauth (born October 1974) is a Portuguese fado singer.

== Life and career ==
Arnauth was born in Lisbon, Portugal, in October 1974, and her career began in 1995 when she was invited by João Braga to participate in a concert at S. Luis's Theater.

She released her debut album in 1999, which won the award for Best Upcoming Voice from the weekly magazine Blitz. She performed concerts in the Netherlands, Denmark, and Italy, as well as at the Centro Cultural de Belém in Lisbon.

Her second album, Esta Voz Que Me Atravessa (English: This voice that goes through me) was released in 2001, produced by Amélia Muge and José Martins. Andreas Dorschel praised the album, writing that: "capable of the tenderest nuances of voice, [Mafalda Arnauth] ingeniously counterbalances them with a roughness that calls to mind fado's subcultural origins".

Mafalda Arnauth's third album, Encantamento, was self-produced.

== Discography ==
=== Solo ===
- Mafalda Arnauth (1999) CD
- Esta voz que me atravessa (2001) CD
- Encantamento (2003) CD
- Talvez se Chame Saudade (2005) Compilation
- Diário (2005) CD
- Flor de Fado (2009) CD
- Fadas (2010) CD
- Terra Da Luz (2013) CD
- Mafalda Arnauth & Antlantihda (2015) CD

=== Collaborations ===
- Pessoa (2013) — With Fernando Lameirinhas and Eric Vloeimans
- Mariano Deidda canta Pessoa - Mensagem (2013) — Singing the song «Mare Portoghese» with Mariano Deidda
