= Sol (newspaper) =

Portuguese weekly national newspaper

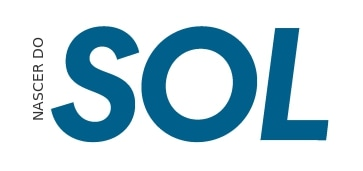

- The 1 September 2007 front page of Sol
- Type: Weekly newspaper – Every Friday
- Format: Tabloid
- Owner: Newsplex, SA
- Publisher: Newsplex, SA
- Editor: Mário Ramires
- Founded: 16 September 2006; 19 years ago
- Political alignment: Centre-right to Right-wing
- Language: Portuguese
- Headquarters: Lisbon
- Circulation: 33,089 (2011)
- Website: sol.sapo.pt

Sol (Portuguese pronunciation: [sɔl]; Portuguese for Sun) is a Portuguese language weekly national newspaper published every Fridays in all the country, Portugal. It leans on the right wing of the political spectrum.

== History and profile ==
Sol was first published on 16 September 2006, selling 120 thousand copies. In October 2014, Sol reached a weekly circulation of 22,345 copies, choosing shortly after to stop having its sales audited. The paper was founded by José António Saraiva with the premise to compete with the long-established Expresso.

Initially independent, Sol was acquired by Newshold in 2009. Álvaro Sobrinho's Angolan company would join the shareholder structure of newspaper i in 2014, before closing and declaring bankruptcy the following year. 120 workers were fired, and the salaries of the 66 employees who remained between the two publications were reduced. Sol had presented a loss of 4.4 million euros in 2014.

Sol himself released the recording of the plenary session in which the bankruptcy was announced. At the meeting, administrator Mário Ramires asks workers to give up the compensation to which they are legally entitled, considering journalists who demand it "rats", stressing that "no one has the right to anything" stipulated by law.

In 2015, Mário Ramires merged the newsrooms of the newspaper i and do Sol, remaining director and owner of both publications through Newsplex, a company of which he is the sole administrator.

Sol competes directly with another Portuguese weekly, Expresso, from the Impresa group, which holds the undisputed leadership in this segment, and with the weekly version of Diário de Notícias.

In December 2020, the weekly Sol changed its name to Nascer do Sol.

In July 2022, Alpac Capital, owned by Pedro Vargas David and Luís Santos, formalized the purchase of Nascer do Sol e i. Mário Ramires, owner and director of the titles, remains in editorial leadership.
