= Ana Moura =

Portuguese fado singer (born 1979)

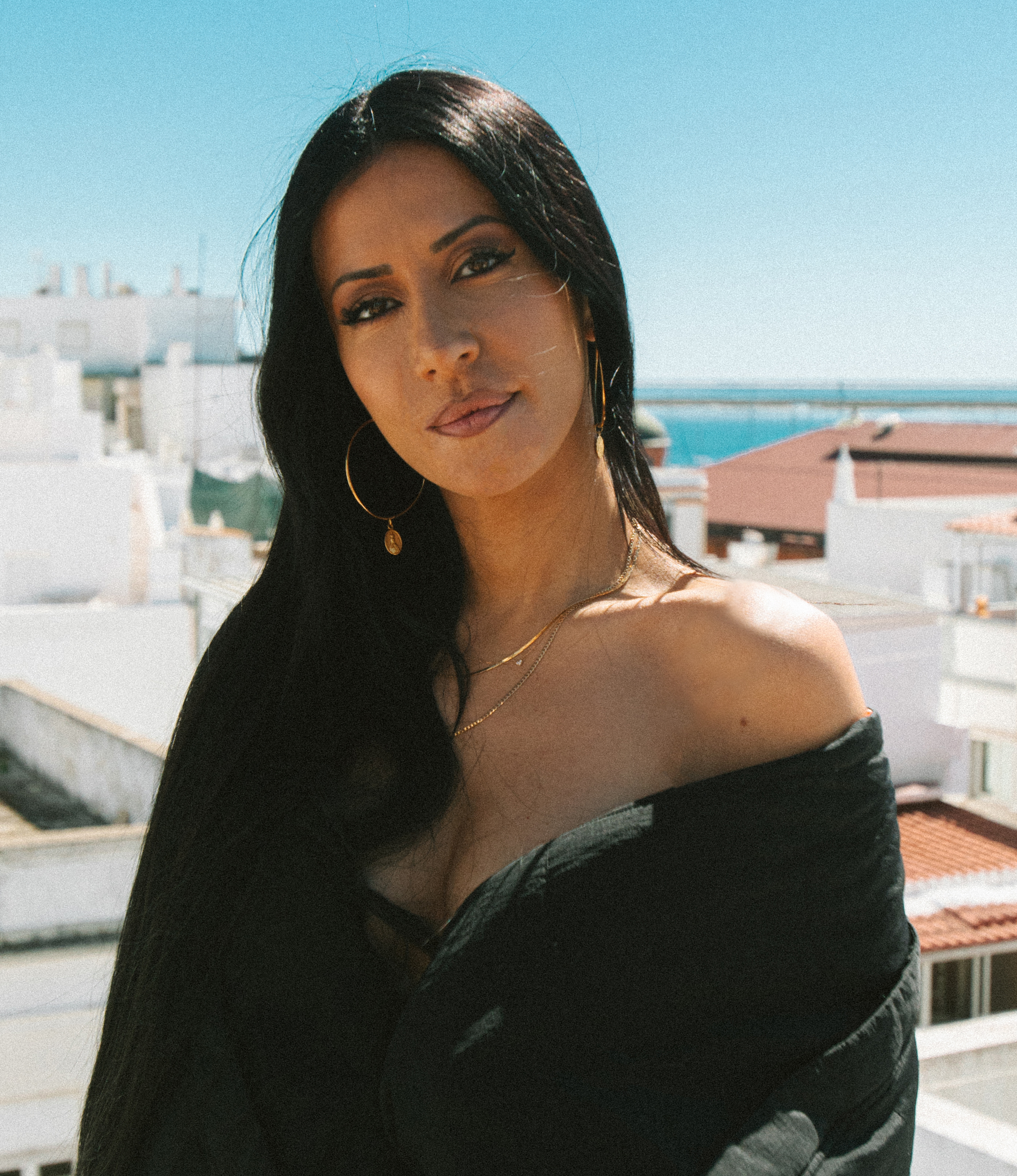
- Moura in 2021

Background information
- Born: Ana Cláudia Moura Pereira; 17 September 1979 (age 46); Santarém, Portugal
- Genres: Fado
- Occupation: Singer
- Website: anamoura.pt

Ana Cláudia Moura Pereira (born 17 September 1979), known as Ana Moura, is a Portuguese fado singer. An internationally recognized singer, she was the youngest fadista to be nominated for a Dutch Edison Award.

== Early life and career ==
Ana Moura was born on 17 September 1979, in Santarém, Portugal. From Portuguese and some Angolan ancestry, starting in her childhood, Moura also lived in Coruche before settling with her parents in Carcavelos.

Ana Moura's debut album was Guarda-me a Vida na Mão (2003), followed by Aconteceu (2004). She sang in various nightspots in Lisbon and became known on television, performing fado with António Pinto Basto. Para Além da Saudade (2007), containing songs such as "Os Buzios" or "Fado da Procura", is the album that followed Aconteceu. With this album and appearances on programs such as Family Contact and Superstar, Moura became more widely known in Portugal. These television appearances helped promote this record, which was to reach triple platinum for sales exceeding 45,000 units. The album stayed in the Top 30 in Portugal for 78 weeks. For this album, Moura received a nomination for the Golden Globes in the category of Music, Best Individual Performer, eventually losing out to Jorge Palma. In 2007, Ana Moura joined the Rolling Stones in concert at the Alvalade XXI stadium in Lisbon. She sang "No Expectations" with Mick Jagger. After two big concerts in coliseums of Porto and Lisbon, Moura launched her first live DVD on 24 November 2008, which has enjoyed great success. She appeared at the World Music Institute concert. With the recognition from critics came also the recognition of peers, and in 2008, Ana Moura received the prize for "best performance Amalia". In 2009, rock artist Prince stated he was a fan of fado, and expressed interest in collaborating musically with Ana. Prince traveled to Lisbon in July 2011.

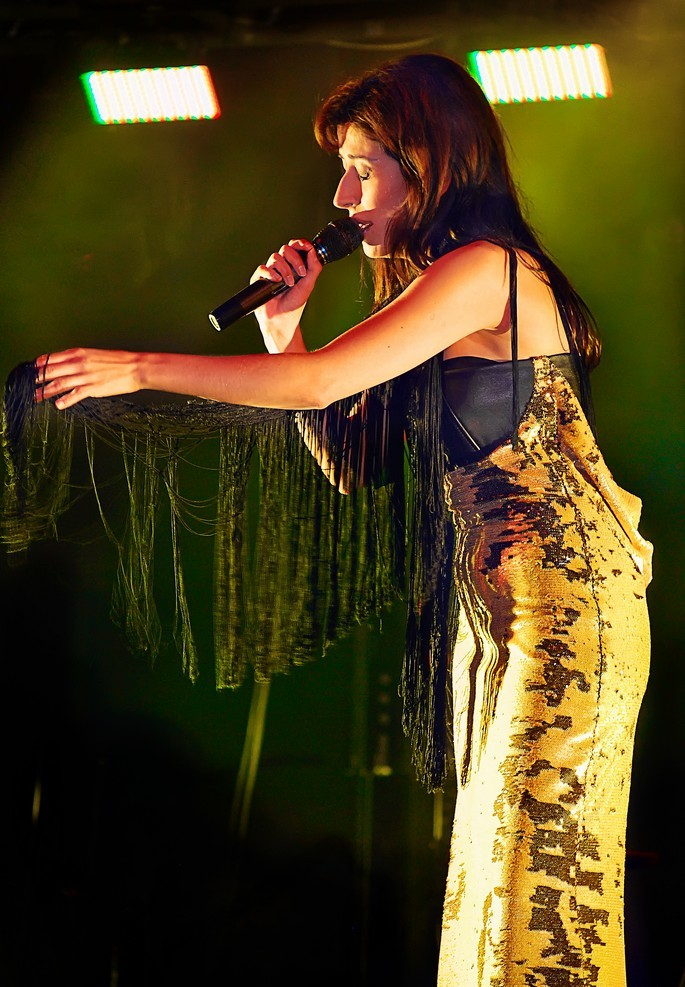
Ana Moura in concert, 2010

Moura's album Leva-me aos Fados ("Take Me to a Fado House"), released on 12 October 2009 (presented at the Casa da Música – Porto Coliseum and Lisbon on 20 and 21 October) reached the Top 10 of best-selling albums, and went platinum. With songs such as "Leva-me aos Fados" (single presentation), "Caso Arrumado", "Rumo ao Sul" and "Fado Vestido de Fado" Ana Moura delighted her audience. Ana began to tour in Portugal and abroad, with concerts in northern Portugal, London, Canada, Austria and Germany. She appeared at the 2010 and 2011 San Francisco Jazz Festival. Moura sang with Italian singer Pacifico on the song "Pioggia sul mio alfabeto". Her fifth album, Desfado, was produced by former Joni Mitchell producer Larry Klein and featured her cover of Mitchell's "A Case of You." Released in November 2012, the album debuted at number 2 and went on to top the chart. The album topped sales in Portugal for 6 weeks, spent 117 weeks in the top 10 and 200 weeks on the entire chart, making it the all-time best-charting album in Portugal. The album was certified 6× Platinum by the Portuguese Phonographic Association and became the best-selling album of the 2010s released by a local act. Two singles from it were released, including "Até ao Verão" and the title track. In 2015, Moura released her 6th studio album, titled Moura. Moura debuted at number 2 on the Portuguese charts and rose to the number 1 spot, remaining there for 4 weeks. It has spent a total of 168 weeks on the charts and is ranked as the 4th best-charting album of all time in Portugal. Like Moura's previous album, it was produced by Larry Klein, and features 13 Portuguese tracks, and 1 English track—a cover of "Lilac Wine". Omara Portuondo of Buena Vista Social Club duets with Moura on "Eu Entrego". In 2022, she released the album Casa Guilhermina.

== Personal life ==
Her first child, a girl, was born in May 2022 from a relationship with musician Pedro Mafama.

== Discography ==
=== Studio albums ===
Title	Details	Peak chart positions
Title	Details	POR
Guarda-me A Vida Na Mão	Released: 2003; Label: Mercury Records; Formats: CD	28
Aconteceu	Released: 2004; Label: World Village; Formats: CD	-
Para Além da Saudade	Released: 15 August 2007; Label: World Village; Formats: CD	4
Leva-me aos Fados	Released: 12 October 2009; Label: World Village; Formats: CD	2
Desfado	Released: 12 November 2012; Label: Universal Records; Formats: CD	1
Moura	Released: 2015; Label: Universal Music Classics; Formats: CD	1
Casa Guilhermina	Released: 2022; Label: Sony Music; Formats: CD, LP	1

=== Live albums ===
- Coliseu (2008)

=== Video albums ===
- Coliseu (2008)

=== Non-album tracks (including Ana as featured vocalist) ===
- 2005: "Filha De Hervas" – Various Artists – A Tribute to Amalia Rodrigues
- 2005: "De Nua" – Sara Tavares – Balance
- 2008: "Brown Sugar" and "No Expectations" – Tim Ries – Stones World: The Rolling Stones Project
- 2010: "Saia de Carolina" – Leopoldina – Missão Sorriso
- 2012: "Janelas Obertas, No. 2" – Various Artists – A Tribute to Caetano Veloso
- 2012: "Pioggia Sul Mio Alfabeto" – Pacifico – Una Voce Non Basta
- 2012: "Por Um Dia" – Jorge Fernando – Memória E Fado and O Nosso Fado
- 2013: "Novo Fado Alegre" – Carlos do Carmo – Fado E Amor
- 2013: "Sabe Deus" – Idan Raichel – Quarter to Six
- 2014: "Clandestinos do Amor" – Movie Soundtrack – Os Gatos Não Tem Vertigens
- 2015: "Maldicão" – Various Artists – Amalia: As Vozes Do Fado
- 2015: "O Recomeço: Cessar Fogo, Pt. 2" – Aldina Duarte – Romances
- 2015: "Eu Seguro" – They're Heading West – They’re Heading West
- 2015: "E Tu Gostavas de Mim" and "Reader's Digest" – Miguel Araujo – Cidade Grande Ao Vivo no Coliseu do Porto
- 2017: "Manto de Água" – Agir – Manto de Água
- 2017: "Man Who Sold the World" – David Fonseca – Bowie 70
- 2018: "Não Hesitva un Segundo" – Toze Brito – A Memoria de Amor
- 2019: "Dor Sem Álibi” – Pedro Abrunhosa - Espiritual
- 2019: "Depressa Demais" – Stereossuaro – Bairro da Ponte
- 2020: "Vinte Vinte" – Branko & Conan Osiris
- 2021: "Linda Forma de Morrer" - Pedro Mafama - Por Este Rio Abaixo
- 2022: "Leva o Rosario Contigo" - Rita Dias - Morremos Tanto Para Crescer
- 2022: "Te Amo" (Calema cover)
- 2023: "La Vai Ela"
- 2024: "La Vai Ela (Remix) (featuring MJ Nebreda)"
- 2024: "Desliza"
- 2025: "Lento" - VanyFox (featuring Ana Moura)
- 2025: "Maré" - Ricardo Ribeiro (featuring Ana Moura)
- 2026: "Era de Aquário/Deixa o Sol Entrar" - MARO (featuring Ana Moura)
- 2026: "Bailar" - ProfJam (featuring Ana Moura)

=== Album tracks on compilations (partial list) ===
- 2005: "Porque Teimas Nesta Dor" - The Best of Fado: Um Tesoura Portugues Vol. 3
- 2007: "Lavava no Rio Lavava" – Saudade: Ámalia Noutras Vozes
- 2008: "Fado De Pessoa" – Songs of the Siren: Irresistible Voices
- 2008: "Até ao Fim do Fim" – A Outra (Soundtrack)
- 2009: "Os Búzios" – Fado Anthologia I & II
- 2011: "Amor em Tons de Sol Maior" – Fado Portugal
- 2011: "Jardim da Saudade" – Fados e Canções do Alvim
- 2012: "Caso Arrumado" – Fado
- 2012: "Amor em Tons de Sol Maior" – The Story of Fado
- 2012: "Mouraria" – New Queens of Fado
- 2013: "A Fadista" – Este Meu Fado
- 2013: "Os Búzios" – Fado Montra Nacional
- 2013: "A Case of You" – This is Cool!
- 2014: "Amor em Tons de Sol Maior" – Best of Portugal
- 2014: "E Tu Gostavas de Mim" – Fado Alegre
- 2014: "Desfado" – Fado Festival De Fado De Madrid
- 2015: "Os Búzios" – The Very Best of Fado: Um Tesoura Portugues
- 2016: "Os Búzios" – Caixa Ribeira: Os Maiores Fadistas do Nosso Tempo
- 2016: "Desfado" – The Best of Fado: Scissors Portugues Vol. 7
- 2017: "Moura Encantada" and "I deliver" – NAP Festival, 2017
- 2018: "Manto de Agua" – No Fame (digital only)
- 2019: "Moura" – Siesta Festival, 2019
- 2019: "A Case of You" – Herbie Hancock Songbook (digital only)
