= O Melhor de Rui Veloso – 20 anos depois =

Greatest hits album by Rui Veloso
- Released: 2000
- Genre: Rock, soft rock, pop rock
- Length: 75:36
- Label: EMI-Valentim de Carvalho

Rui Veloso chronology
Avenidas (1998)	O Melhor de Rui Veloso – 20 anos depois (2000)	O Concerto Acústico (2003)

O Melhor de Rui Veloso – 20 anos depois (The Best of Rui Veloso – 20 Years Later) is a greatest hits album by Rui Veloso. The album was released in 2000.

== Track listing ==
No.	Title	Title Translation	Length
1.	"Chico fininho" (from Ar de Rock)	Skinny Chico	2:28
2.	"Sei de uma Camponesa" (from Ar de Rock)	I know of a country woman	3:46
3.	"Um Café e um Bagaço"	A coffee and a bagaço shot	3:34
4.	"Estrela de rock and roll" (from Fora de Moda)	Rock and roll star	4:17
5.	"A Gente Não Lê" (from Fora de Moda)	We don't read	4:05
6.	"A Ilha" (from Guardador de Margens)	The island	4:00
7.	"Máquina Zero" (from Guardador de Margens)	Clipper size #0	2:40
8.	"Porto Côvo" (from Rui Veloso)	Porto Côvo	3:50
9.	"Cavaleiro Andante" (from Rui Veloso)	Errant knight	3:43
10.	"Porto Sentido" (from Rui Veloso)	Porto feeling	4:25
11.	"Fado do Ladrão Enamorado"	Fado of the thief in love	2:12
12.	"Fio de Beque" (from Mingos & Os Samurais)	Wordplay: portuguese pronunciation of "feedback"	3:14
13.	"Não há Estrelas no Céu" (from Mingos & Os Samurais)	There are no stars in the sky	3:22
14.	"A Paixão (Segundo Nicolau da Viola)" (from Mingos & Os Samurais)	The passion (according to Nicolau on guitar)	3:46
15.	"Logo que passe a Monção" (from Auto da Pimenta)	Once the monsoon passes	5:33
16.	"Maubere"	Maubere	4:33
17.	"Lado Lunar" (from Lado Lunar)	Lunar side	4:32
18.	"Todo o Tempo do Mundo" (from Avenidas)	All the time in the world	4:17
19.	"Jura" (from Avenidas)	Swear	3:29
20.	"Não me mintas"	Don't lie to me	3:50
Total length:			75:36

== Sales ==
Sales for O Melhor de...
Region	Sales
Portugal	80,000
