= GNR discography =

Artist discography

- Studio albums: 12
- Extended plays: 4
- Live albums: 1
- Compilation albums: 3
- Singles: 9
- Other Appearances: 4

The discography of GNR (an acronym of "Grupo Novo Rock"), a Porto, Portuguese-based post-punk group, consists of ten studio albums, nine singles, one live albums, four extended plays and three compilation albums. This list does not include material performed by members or former members of GNR that was recorded with associated acts.

== Albums ==
=== Studio ===
Year	Album details
1982	Independança: Released: April, 1982; Label: Valentim de Carvalho; Formats: LP
1984	Defeitos Especiais: Released: April, 1984; Label: EMI - Valentim de Carvalho; Formats: LP
1985	Os Homens Não Se Querem Bonitos: Released: July, 1985; Label: EMI - Valentim de Carvalho; Formats: LP
1986	Psicopátria: Released: October, 1986; Label: EMI - Valentim de Carvalho; Formats: LP
1989	Valsa Dos Detectives: Released: March, 1989; Label: EMI - Valentim de Carvalho; Formats: LP
1992	Rock in Rio Douro: Released: May, 1992; Label: EMI - Valentim de Carvalho; Formats: CD, LP
1994	Sob Escuta: Released: May, 1994; Label: EMI - Valentim de Carvalho; Formats: CD, LP
1998	Mosquito: Released: March, 1998; Label: EMI - Valentim de Carvalho; Formats: CD, LP
2000	Popless: Released: March, 2000; Label: EMI - Valentim de Carvalho; Formats: CD, LP
2002	Do Lado Dos Cisnes: Released: November, 2002; Label: EMI - Valentim de Carvalho; Formats: CD, LP
2010	Retropolitana: Released: April, 2010; Label: Farol Editora; Formats: CD, LP
2011	Voos Domésticos: Released: July, 2011; Label: EMI - Portugal; Formats: CD, LP

=== Live ===
Year	Album details
1990	GNR In Vivo: Released: October, 1990; Label: EMI - Valentim de Carvalho; Formats: CD, LP
2017	Os Primeiros 35 Anos (ao Vivo): Released: February, 2017; Label: Indiefada; Formats: CD, LP

=== Compilations ===
Year	Album details
1996	Tudo o Que Você Queria Ouvir - O Melhor dos GNR: Released: May, 1996; Label: EMI - Valentim de Carvalho; Formats: CD, LP
2002	Câmara Lenta: Released: 2002; Label: EMI - Valentim de Carvalho; Formats: CD, LP
2006	ContinuAcção - O Melhor dos GNR, Vol. 3: Released: 2006; Label: EMI - Valentim de Carvalho; Formats: CD, LP

== Extended plays ==
Year	EP Details
1983	Twistarte: Released: 1983; Label: Valentim de Carvalho; Formats: 12-inch
1984	Pershingópolis: Released: 1984; Label: Valentim de Carvalho; Formats: 12-inch
1988	Vídeo Maria: Released: January 1988; Label: Valentim de Carvalho; Formats: 12-inch
1992	Quando o Telefone Pecca: Released: 1992; Label: EMI - Valentim de Carvalho; Formats: 12-inch, CD

== Singles ==
Year	Single Details
1981	"Portugal na CEE": Released: March 1981; Label: Valentim de Carvalho; Formats: Single
1981	"Sê Um GNR": Released: October 1981; Label: Valentim de Carvalho; Formats: Single
1982	"Hardcore (1º Escalão)": Released: 1982; Label: Valentim de Carvalho; Formats: Single
1985	"Dunas": Released: 1985; Label: EMI - Valentim de Carvalho; Formats: Single
1987	"Efectivamente": Released: 1987; Label: EMI - Valentim de Carvalho; Formats: Single
1987	"Ao Soldado Desconfiado": Released: 1987; Label: EMI - Valentim de Carvalho; Formats: Single
1996	"Dunas": Released: 1996; Label: EMI - Valentim de Carvalho; Formats: CD single
1998	"Mosquito": Released: 1998; Label: EMI - Valentim de Carvalho; Formats: CD single
2003	"Canadada": Released: 2003; Label: EMI - Valentim de Carvalho; Formats: CD single

== Other appearances ==
Year	Details
1994	Filhos da Madrugada: Released: 1994; Song: "Coro Dos Tribunais"
1996	A Cantar Con Xabarín III/IV: Released: 1996; Song: "Corvos"
1999	XX Anos XX Bandas: Released: 1999; Song: "Quando Eu Morrer"
2000	Digital Gaia: Released: 2000; Song: "Danceteria"
