= 20 Anos Depois – Ar de Rock =

Compilation album by Rui Veloso
- Released: 2000
- Genre: rock, blues rock, pop rock
- Length: 35:53
- Label: EMI

20 Anos Depois – Ar de Rock (literally Air of Rock, meaning "a rock look"; a pun on hard rock: 20 Years Later) is a compilation album released by Portuguese rock singer Rui Veloso. The album was released in 2000.

The disc was recorded in commemoration of the 20th anniversary of his first album Ar de Rock released in 1980.

The album features mostly Portuguese artists including Xutos & Pontapés, Clã, Ala dos Namorados and some more, which recorded the original songs with the first mock-up themes. Other artists included the Portuguese-born Nuno Bettencourt and Brazilian singers including Os Paralamas do Sucesso and Barão Vermelho. The last three are not included in the previous album.

== Track listing ==
No.	Title	Length
1.	"Rapariguinha do Shopping" (Ala dos Namorados)
2.	"Ai Quem Me Dera Rolar Contigo num Palheiro" (Os Paralamas do Sucesso)
3.	"Bairro do Oriente" (Clã)
4.	"Afurada" (Jorge Palma & Flak)
5.	"Chico Fininho" (Xutos & Pontapés)
6.	"Sei de Uma Componesa" (Barão Vermelho)
7.	"Miúda (Fora de Mim)" (Du Weasel)
8.	"Saiu Para a Rua" (Sara Tavares)
9.	"No Domingo fui às Antas" (Mão Morta)
10.	"Harmónica Azul (instrumental)" (Danças Ocultas)
11.	"Donzela Diesel" (Belle Chase Hotel)
12.	"Hold Me in a Decent Way" (Lúcia Moniz)
13.	"Every Diamond" (Nuno Bettencourt)
14.	"Inner Street" (Santos & Pecadores)
