= Nancy Vieira =

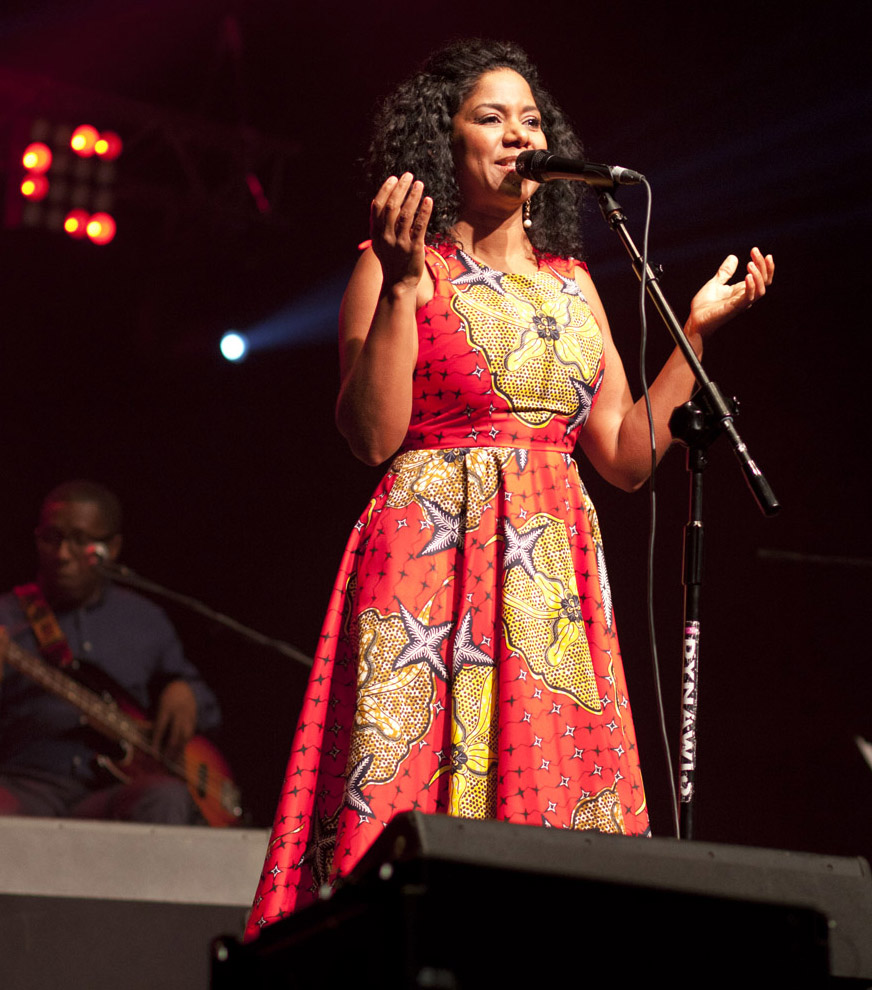
- Nancy Vieira performing in Łódź, Poland, 2016

Background information
- Born: 1975 (age 49–50); Bissau, Guinea-Bissau
- Occupation(s): singer, musician, composer

Nancy Vieira (born 1975) is a Cape Verdean singer. She was born in Guinea-Bissau and currently resides in Portugal.

== Biography ==
Vieira was born in 1975 in Bissau, Guinea-Bissau to Cape Verdean parents, she later moved to Cape Verde and her family returned, when she was a child, she immigrated to Lisbon when she was 14. Outside Portugal and Cape Verde, she performed on stage in the United Kingdom, the Netherlands, the United States, Angola and a couple of others.

Nôs Raça was her first recorded album. Her style characterizes with a fusion of rhythmic traditions of Cape Verdean music and international influences, mainly Brazil and the Caribbean.

She appeared in the disc "Música de intervenção Cabo Verdiana : a história da luta de independência de Cabo Verde contada em música" in 1999, sings included "Hitler câ tâ ganhá guerra" (by Titina Rodrigues) and "Apocalypse" by Ildo Lobo and other names.

She recorded "Segred" in 2004. She later recorded a single "Canção" de Alterne" (Carlos Tê/Rui Veloso) in the album A Espuma das Canções by Rui Veloso, released in 2005.

She took part in recording the album Mentiroso Normal by Ala dos Namorados. She sang with the group Rão Kyao on stage at Sunset Rock in Rio, Rock in Rio Festival of Lisbon, 2008.

Vieira recorded with another Cape Verdean singer Dany Silva in an album commemorating 40 years of his career.

Vieira participated with the Portuguese pianist and composer Manuel Paulo who released Pássaro Cego in 2009. The album reunited influences from different genres including pop, jazz, fado, morna and other Cape Verdean music traditions and chamber music, with letters by João Monge and started with a special CD and book edition (published by Arthouse Group, Valentim de Carvalho, and was received support by the Portuguese Authors Society and was recognized as cultural interest by the Portuguese Ministry of Culture. The disc features several different singers especially Brazilian singer Chico César who sang Ilha dos Amantes. Together she sang the song with Sara Tavares and recorded a single for the telenovela soundtrack of Laços de Sangue, which was broadcast by SIC and produced by SIC/TV Globo.

Nô Amá is her recent release and her fifth album published by Lusafrica in 2012, she sang and recorded two singles one in Cape Verdean Creole ("Fitisera di Klaridon") in 2010 and in Portuguese ("Voz & Guitarra 2 - Corpo Encantado") in 2012 with Júlio Pereira.

She appeared in a couple of more concerts, some were in Poland as she appeared in the Siesta Festival in Gdańsk in 2014 and two years later in Wrocław and Łódź.

== Discography ==
- Nôs Raça (Our Race) (Disconorte, 1995)
- Segred (Praça Nova, 2004)
- Lus (Light) (Harmonia Mundi/World Village, 2007)
- Pássaro Cego, with Manuel Paulo, 2009
- Nô Amá (Lusafrica, 2012)
- Manhã Florida (Lusafrica, 2018)

=== Other recordings, collaborations and collections ===
- 1996 - Derito
- 2003 - "Ao vivo no B.Leza" - Dze q'dze / Ce la vie
- 2005 - Rui Veloso, "Canção de Alterne" in the album A Espuma das Canções
- 2006 - Jon Luz
- 2006 - José Barros - Regresso
- 2007 - Sons da Fala - Nhor Deus
- 2007 - O canto dos animais - O papagaio fofoca
- 2010 - "Reintervenção" - Tributo a José Afonso (Reintervention: A Tribute to José Afonso) - Tu Gitana
- 2010 - Júlio Pereira - Fitisera Di Klaridon
- 2013 - Voz & Guitarra 2 (Voices and Guitars 2) - Corpo Encantado, with Júlio Pereira
