= Ao Vivo =

Ao Vivo (Portuguese, 'live') may refer to the following music albums:

- Ao Vivo, a 1987 album by Brazilian singer-songwriter Beto Guedes
- Ao Vivo, a 1983 album by Brazilian singer-songwriter Milton Nascimento
- Ao Vivo, a 1988 album by Portuguese rock band Xutos & Pontapés
- Ao Vivo (Rui Veloso album), a 1988 album by Portuguese musician Rui Veloso
- Ao Vivo, a 1989 album by Brazilian singer-songwriter Joyce
- Ao Vivo, a 1989 album by Brazilian singer Ney Matogrosso
- Ao Vivo, a 1990 album by Brazilian forró singer-songwriter Elba Ramalho
- Ao Vivo, a 1990 album by Brazilian Christian metal band Oficina G3
- Ao Vivo, a 1991 album by Brazilian soft rock band Roupa Nova
- Ao Vivo, a 1992 album by Brazilian sertanejo duo Chitãozinho & Xororó
- Ao Vivo, a 1996 album by Brazilian rock band Capital Inicial
- Ao Vivo, a 1996 album by Brazilian singer Carlinhos Felix
- Ao Vivo, a 1997 album by Brazilian sertanejo duo João Paulo & Daniel
- Ao Vivo, a 1999 album by Brazilian singer-songwriter Zeca Pagodinho
- Ao Vivo, a 2000 album by Brazilian sertanejo duo Zezé Di Camargo & Luciano
- Banda Calypso Ao Vivo, a 2001 album by Brazilian brega pop band Calypso
- Ao Vivo, a 2001 album by Brazilian sertanejo singer Daniel
- Ao Vivo, a 2001 album by Brazilian singer-songwriter Erasmo Carlos
- Ao Vivo, a 2001 album by Brazilian hip hop group Racionais MC's
- Ao Vivo, 2001 and 2002 live albums by Brazilian sertanejo duo Zezé Di Camargo & Luciano
- Ao Vivo, a 2002 album by Brazilian pagode groupo Exaltasamba
- Ao Vivo, a 2002 album by Brazilian contemporary Christian music singer Rose Nascimento
- Ao Vivo, a 2003 album by Brazilian rap group Detentos do Rap
- Ao Vivo, a 2003 album by Brazilian gospel music singer-songwriter J. Neto
- Ao Vivo, a 2003 album by Brazilian rock band Resgate
- Kelly Key – Ao Vivo, a 2004 album by Portuguese-Brazilian pop singer-songwriter Kelly Key
- Ao Vivo, a 2005 album by Brazilian rock band Biquíni Cavadão
- Ao Vivo, a 2005 album by Brazilian sertanejo duo João Bosco & Vinícius
- Ao Vivo, a 2006 album by Brazilian Christian hip hop group Apocalipse 16
- Ao Vivo, a 2006 album by Brazilian popular music singer Gal Costa
- Ao Vivo, a 2007 album by Brazilian sertanejo singer-songwriter Eduardo Costa
- Ao Vivo, a 2007 album by Brazilian sertanejo duo Zé Henrique & Gabriel
- Ao Vivo, a 2008 album by Brazilian contemporary Christian music singer-songwriter Jamily
- Ao Vivo, a 2008 album by sertanejo duo Marcos & Belutti
- Ao Vivo, a 2009 album by Brazilian singer-songwriter Luan Santana
- Ao Vivo, a 2010 album by Brazilian sertanejo singer-songwriter Michel Teló
- Ao Vivo, a 2010 album by Brazilian reggae-rock band O Rappa
- Ao Vivo, a 2011 album by Brazilian singer Bruna Karla
- Ao Vivo, a 2011 album by Brazilian contemporary Christian music singer Eliane Silva
- Ao Vivo, a 2014 album by Brazilian singer-songwriter Céu
- Ao Vivo, a 2016 album by Brazilian singer Flordelis
- Ao Vivo, a 2017 album by Brazilian contemporary Christian music singer Shirley Carvalhaes
