= O Concerto Acústico =

Live album by Rui Veloso
- Released: 2003
- Genre: Acoustic rock, soft rock
- Length: 126:11
- Label: EMI
- Producer: Paulo Junqueiro, Rui Veloso

Rui Veloso chronology
| O Melhor de Rui Veloso - 20 anos depois (2000) | O Concerto Acústico (2003) | A Espuma das Canções (2005) |

O Concerto Acústico (The Acoustic Concert) is a live album and video album by Rui Veloso, released through EMI Portugal in 2003. The album was released on CD and DVD. It was recorded live at Duvideo Studios, except for "Presépio de Lata", "Cavaleiro Andante" and "Primeiro Beijo", which were recorded at the Belém Cultural Center in Lisbon in December 2002, and "Porto Sentido", which was recorded at the Porto Coliseum in February 2003.

== Track listing ==
=== CD ===
Disc 1

| No. | Title | Length |
|---|---|---|
| 1. | "Fado do Ladrão Enamorado" | 5:58 |
| 2. | "A gente não lé" | 4:44 |
| 3. | "Nunca me esqueci de ti" | 3:15 |
| 4. | "Bairro de Oriente" | 5:48 |
| 5. | "Saiu para a rua" | 4:37 |
| 6. | "Nativa" | 4:50 |
| 7. | "Sayago Blues" | 5:43 |
| 8. | "Os velhos do jardim" | 4:31 |
| 9. | "Jura" | 3:25 |
| 10. | "Todo o tempo do Mundo" | 6:50 |
| 11. | "Porto Covo" | 3:56 |
| Total length: | | 53:37 |

Disc 2

| No. | Title | Length |
|---|---|---|
| 1. | "O prometido é devido" | 5:33 |
| 2. | "Dia de passeio" | 4:18 |
| 3. | "Lado Lunar" | 4:50 |
| 4. | "Não de Mintas" | 6:47 |
| 5. | "A Paixão (Segunda Nicolau da Viola)" | 5:11 |
| 6. | "Chico Fininho" | 3:23 |
| 7. | "Não há estrelas no céu" | 4:21 |
| 8. | "Presépio da Lata" (bonus track) | 4:39 |
| 9. | "Cavaleiro Andante" (bonus track) | 4:13 |
| 10. | "Primeiro beijo" (bonus track) | 3:51 |
| 11. | "Porto Sentido" (bonus track) | 5:28 |
| Total length: | | 52:34 |

=== DVD ===
1. "Fado do Ladrão Enamorado
2. "A gente não lê"
3. "Bairro do Oriente"
4. "Saiu para a Rua"
5. "Nunca me Esqueci de Ti"
6. "Nativa"
7. "Sayago Blues"
8. "Os Velhos do Jardim"
9. "Todo o Tempo do Mundo"
10. "Porto Covo"
11. "O Prometido é Devido"
12. "Jura"
13. "Dia de passeio"
14. "Lado lunar"
15. "Não me Mintas"
16. "Chico Fininho"
17. "Não há Estrelas no Céu"
18. "A Paixão"
