= List of best-selling albums in Portugal =

This is the list of best-selling albums in Portugal.

Album	Artist	Released	Sales	Certification
Feijão com Arroz	Daniela Mercury	1996	300,000	7× Platinum (Note: Platinum certification prior to 2005, equivalent to 40,000 copies sold.)
Mingos & Os Samurais	Rui Veloso	1990	280,000	7× Platinum
O Caminho da Felicidade	Delfins	1995	240,000	6× Platinum
Álbum Dance	Iran Costa	1995	240,000	6× Platinum
Waking Up The Neighbours	Bryan Adams	1991	240,000	6× Platinum
Quase Tudo	Paulo Gonzo	1997	240,000	6× Platinum
Silence Becomes It	Silence 4	1998	240,000	6× Platinum
Album Dance	Iran Costa	1995	220,000	
Floribella	Flor	2006	200,000	10× Platinum (Note: Platinum certification in the period 2005-2010, equivalent to 20,000 copies sold.)
Romanza	Andrea Bocelli	1997	200,000	5× Platinum
The Best of 1980–1990	U2	1998	200,000	5× Platinum
Saber A Mar	Delfins	1996	200,000	5× Platinum
Tempo	Pedro Abrunhosa	1996	180,000	4× Platinum
Maravilhoso Coração	Marco Paulo	1991	175,000	4× Platinum
Eu Sou Aquele	Excesso	1997	160,000	4× Platinum
Acústico	André Sardet	2006	160,000	8× Platinum
Laundry Service	Shakira	2001	160,000	4× Platinum
Caribe Mix	Various artists	2000	160,000	
Best 1991–2004	Seal	2004	160,000	4× Platinum
O Disco de Ouro	Marco Paulo	1982	140,000	
Viagens	Pedro Abrunhosa	1994	140,000	3× Platinum
A Vida Que Eu Escolhi	Tony Carreira	2006	140,000	7× Platinum
O Homem Que Sou	Tony Carreira	2008	140,000	7× Platinum
D'ZRT	D'ZRT	2005	130,000	7× Platinum
Lágrimas	Dulce Pontes	1993	120,000	3× Platinum
Fado em Mim	Mariza	2002	120,000	6× Platinum
Sem Limite	Santamaria	1999	120,000	
1	The Beatles	2000	120,000	3× Platinum
Fado Curvo	Mariza	2003	120,000	6× Platinum
Delicate Sound of Thunder	Pink Floyd	1988	120,000	3× Platinum
How to Dismantle an Atomic Bomb	U2	2004	120,000	3× Platinum
Canta Bahia	Various artists	2001	120,000	
En Acústico	Pablo Alborán	2011	105,000	7× Platinum (Note: Platinum certification since 2011, equivalent to 15,000 copies sold.)
O Melhor de Amália: Estranha Forma de Vida	Amália Rodrigues	1985	100,000	Platinum
Tutte storie	Eros Ramazzotti	1993	100,000	
Titanic: Music from the Motion Picture	James Horner	1997	100,000	

== See also ==
- List of best-selling albums
  - List of best-selling albums by country
- List of best-selling singles by country§Portugal
