= Rui Veloso e Amigos =

Studio album by Rui Veloso
- Released: 26 November 2012
- Genre: Rock, pop
- Length: 54:49
- Label: EMI

Rui Veloso chronology
Ao Vivo no Pavilhão Atlântico (2009)	Rui Veloso e Amigos (2012)

Rui Veloso e Amigos (Rui Veloso and Friends) is the tenth studio album by Rui Veloso. The album was released on 26 November 2012 through EMI.

It is a collaborative album with multiple Lusophone artists, with whom Veloso reinterprets thirteen songs from his career.

== Track listing ==
No.	Title	Length
1.	"Em busca dum visual" (with Jorge Palma)	3:48
2.	"Conceição" (with Camané)	3:20
3.	"Má Fortuna" (with Luís Represas)	4:12
4.	"Mr. Dow Jones" (with Expensive Soul)	3:33
5.	"Os velhos do jardim" (with Carlos do Carmo)	4:15
6.	"Fado do ladrão enamorado" (with Dany Silva)	3:38
7.	"As regras da sensatez" (with Maria João & Mário Laginha)	4:02
8.	"A explicação das estrelas" (with JP Simões)	3:35
9.	"Benvinda sejas Maria" (with Bernardo Sassetti)	4:49
10.	"Nunca me esqueci de ti" (with Ricardo Ribeiro)	3:16
11.	"Primeiro beijo" (with Tito Paris)	3:49
12.	"Corações periféricos" (with Zeca Medeiros)	4:14
13.	"Fado pessoano" (with Manuel João Vieira, Boss AC, Ana Sofia Varela, Paulo Flores, Lura, Tcheka, Zé Ricardo, Manecas Costas and Luanda Cozetti)	4:42

== Charts ==
Chart	Peak position
Portuguese Albums (AFP)	3
