= Avenidas =

Studio album by Rui Veloso
- Released: 1998
- Recorded: September–October 1998
- Studio: Livingston Recording Studios, London
- Genre: Soft rock, pop rock
- Length: 47:02
- Label: EMI-Valentim de Carvalho
- Producer: Luis Jardim

Rui Veloso chronology
Lado Lunar (1995)	Avenidas (1998)	O Melhor de Rui Veloso - 20 anos depois (2000)

Avenidas (Portuguese for Avenues) is the eighth studio album by Rui Veloso, released in late 1998.

The album was recorded at Livingston Recording Studios in London, England between 21 September and 9 October 1998. All songs were written by Carlos Tê except for "Avenidas" and "Moby Dick", which were written by Clara Pinto Correia.

== Track listing ==
No.	Title	Length
1.	"O meu guru"	4:01
2.	"Todo o tempo do mundo"	4:17
3.	"Jura"	3:29
4.	"Inimiga de Classe"	3:59
5.	"Ninguém escreve à Alice"	4:59
6.	"As regras da sensatez"	3:39
7.	"Golden Days"	4:10
8.	"Limpa Corações"	3:41
9.	"Presépio de Lata"	4:15
10.	"Avenidas"	3:57
11.	"Moby Dick"	2:29
12.	"Corações Preféricos"	4:06
Total length:		47:02
