= Ao Vivo (Rui Veloso album) =

Live album by Rui Veloso
- Released: 1988
- Recorded: 4 and 5 June 1987
- Venue: Coliseu do Porto
- Genre: Rock, blues rock, soft rock
- Length: LP edition: 83:02; CD edition: 64:36
- Label: EMI-Valentim de Carvalho
- Producer: Rui Veloso, Amândio Bastos

Rui Veloso chronology
| Rui Veloso (1986) | Ao Vivo (1988) | Mingos & Os Samurais (1990) |

Ao Vivo (Live) is the first live album by Rui Veloso. It was released through EMI-Valentim de Carvalho in late 1988.

== Recording ==
The album was recorded at Coliseu do Porto, in Porto, on 4 and 5 June 1987.

== Track listing ==
Original edition (Double LP)

Disc 1

| No. | Title | Length |
|---|---|---|
| 1. | "Sayago Blues" | 4:00 |
| 2. | "Sei De Uma Camponesa" | 3:20 |
| 3. | "Bairro do Oriente" | 5:00 |
| 4. | "Chico Fininho" | 3:18 |
| 5. | "Saiu Para a Rua" | 3:57 |
| 6. | "Estrela do Rock and Roll" | 5:10 |
| 7. | "Balada da Fiandeira" | 4:13 |
| 8. | "Everyday I Have the Blues" (T-Bone Walker) | 4:00 |
| 9. | "A Ilha" | 3:49 |
| 10. | "Elegia Sanjoanina" | 4:29 |
| Total length: | | 41:16 |

Disc 2

| No. | Title | Length |
|---|---|---|
| 1. | "A Gente Não Lê" | 4:26 |
| 2. | "Guardador de Margens" | 5.18 |
| 3. | "Fado do Ladrão Enamorado" | 2:12 |
| 4. | "Afurada" | 4:10 |
| 5. | "A Origem do Mal" | 3:25 |
| 6. | "Cavaleiro Andante" | 3:38 |
| 7. | "Valsinha das Medalhas" | 4:00 |
| 8. | "Porto Covo" | 4:43 |
| 9. | "Champanhe" | 5:32 |
| 10. | "Porto Sentido" | 4:22 |
| Total length: | | 41:46 |

CD edition

| No. | Title | Length |
|---|---|---|
| 1. | "Sayago Blues" | 4:00 |
| 2. | "Sei De Uma Camponesa" | 3:20 |
| 3. | "Bairro do Oriente" | 5:00 |
| 4. | "Chico Fininho" | 3:18 |
| 5. | "Saiu Para a Rua" | 3:57 |
| 6. | "Balada da Fiandeira" | 4:13 |
| 7. | "Everyday I Have the Blues" (T-Bone Walker) | 4:00 |
| 8. | "A Ilha" | 3:49 |
| 9. | "A Gente Não Lê" | 4:26 |
| 10. | "Guardador de Margens" | 5:18 |
| 11. | "Fado do Ladrão Enamorado" | 2:12 |
| 12. | "Afurada" | 4:10 |
| 13. | "Estrela de Rock and Roll" | 5:10 |
| 14. | "Cavaleiro Andante" | 3:38 |
| 15. | "Porto Covo" | 3:43 |
| 16. | "Porto Sentido" | 4:22 |
| Total length: | | 64:36 |
