= Mingos & Os Samurais =

Portuguese rock album

Studio album by Rui Veloso
- Released: August 7, 1990
- Recorded: January–June 1990
- Studio: Paço d'Arcos Studio, Paço de Arcos
- Genre: Rock, rock and roll, soft rock
- Length: 79:06
- Label: EMI - Valentim de Carvalho
- Producer: Rui Veloso, Carlos Tê

Rui Veloso chronology
Rui Veloso Ao Vivo (1988)	Mingos & Os Samurais (1990)	Auto da Pimenta (1991)

Mingos & Os Samurais (sometimes spelled Mingos e os Samurais) is the fifth studio album by Portuguese musician Rui Veloso, released on 7 August 1990 by EMI-Valentim de Carvalho. It is a concept album that tells the story of a small suburban band during the 1960s and the 1970s.

It is Veloso's most commercially successful album and one of the best-selling albums of all time in Portugal. The album reached number one in the Portuguese album charts and was at the top for 24 weeks. It was certified 7× platinum by the AFP and sold 280,000 copies by early 1992, which was at that time a sales record for a Portuguese artist. The singles "Não Há Estrelas no Céu" and "A Paixão (Segundo Nicolau da Viola)" were very successful as well.

== History ==
The idea for the album was formed in 1982. After the financial independence achieved from his self-titled 1986 album, Veloso got the means to record a double-album about the life of a small suburban band in the 1960s and the 1970s.

"Não Há Estrelas no Céu" was the last song recorded for the album.

== Commercial performance ==
Mingos & Os Samurais was hugely successful in Portugal. It reached number one in the Portuguese album charts two weeks after its release and was number-one for a total of 24 weeks. It was certified 7× platinum by the AFP and sold 280,000 copies by early 1992.

== Legacy ==
In 2009, Mingos & Os Samurais was ranked the 4th greatest Portuguese album of the 1990s by Portuguese music magazine Blitz.

== Track listing ==
All tracks are written by Carlos Tê and Rui Veloso.

Disc 1

No.	Title	Length
1.	"Irmãos de Sangue"	3:27
2.	"O que eu quero ser quando for grande"	4:20
3.	"No dia da Comunhão Solene"	3:41
4.	"O prometido é devido"	4:09
5.	"Não há estrelas no céu"	3:22
6.	"Twist é Sedução I"	2:32
7.	"Conceição"	2:34
8.	"No extremo do Salão"	3:54
9.	"Mago do BIlhar"	4:38
10.	"Sámapatti"	3:31
11.	"Tuna Recreativa"	2:51
12.	"A Gente vai na digressão"	3:17
Total length:		41:16

Disc 2

No.	Title	Length
1.	"Fio de Beque"	3:14
2.	"Morena de Azul"	4:20
3.	"Psicadélico Desesperado"	2:51
4.	"Zira"	4:46
5.	"Baile de Paróquia"	4:53
6.	"A Paixão (Segundo Nicolau da Viola)"	3:46
7.	"Twist é Sedução II"	3:28
8.	"No dia em que o Meno Rock morreu"	2:30
9.	"Um trolha d'areosa"	3:48
10.	"Embalagem de damas (epilogo)"	4:14
Total length:		37:50

== Charts ==
Weekly charts
Chart	Peak position
Portuguese Albums (AFP)	1

== Certifications and sales ==
Region	Certification	Certified units/sales
Portugal (AFP)	7× Platinum	280,000^{^}
^{^} Shipments figures based on certification alone.
