= Out of Style (disambiguation) =

Out of Style or Outta Style most commonly refers to:

- "Out of Style", a 2011 studio album by Finnish rock band Sunrise Avenue
- "Outta Style", a 2016 song by American country singer-songwriter Aaron Watson

Out of Style or Outta Style may also refer to:

== Music ==
=== Albums ===
- Out of Style, an album by Marc Scibilia, 2015
- Out of Style, an EP by Marc Scibilia, 2015
- Fora de Moda (Out of Style in Portuguese), an album by Rui Veloso, 1982

=== Songs ===
- "Out of Style", by J. J. Cale from 5, 1979
- "Out of Style", by Jon Pardi from California Sunrise, 2016
- "Out of Style", by the Joe Jackson Band, B-side of from "The Harder They Come", 1980
- "Out of Style", by Limp Bizkit from Still Sucks, 2021
- "Out of Style", by Soul Asylum from Time's Incinerator, 1986
- "Outta Style", by the Teen Idols from Four on the Floor, 1999
- "Out of Style", by KID BRUNSWICK featuring Beauty School Dropout, 2024
- "Out of Style", by The Wrecks, 2020
- "Outta Style", by the Zero Boys, 1983 and 1995
