= Retropolitana =

Studio album by GNR
- Released: 2010
- Recorded: 2010
- Genre: Alternative rock, Pop rock, Post-punk
- Label: Farol Música, EMI (2011 reissue)

GNR chronology
Do lado dos cisnes (2002)	Retropolitana (2010)	Voos Domésticos (2011)

Singles from Retropolitana
- 1. "Reis do roque"

Professional ratings
Review scores
Source	Rating
Allmusic	3/5 stars

Retropolitana is the eleventh album by the Portuguese band GNR. It was first announced on April 21, 2010. The first single, "Reis do roque", was released on May 1, 2010.

== Track listing ==
1. "Clube dos Encalhados"
2. "Outra X"
3. "Únika"
4. "Reis do Roque"
5. "aiTUNES"
6. "Burro em Pé"
7. "Metropolitana"
8. "Baixa/Chicago"
9. "Pulseira Electrónica"
10. "Nº10"
11. "Na Sombra"
12. "Tatus Tus"

== Charts ==
Chart (2010)	Peak position
Portuguese Albums (AFP)	8
