= Ar de Rock =

Studio album by Rui Veloso
- Released: July 1980
- Studio: RPE Studios, Lisbon
- Genre: Rock, blues rock
- Length: 35:10
- Label: EMI–Valentim de Carvalho
- Producer: António Pinho

Rui Veloso chronology
Ar de Rock (1980)	Fora de Moda (1982)

Singles from Ar de Rock
- 1. "Chico Fininho" Released: 1980; 2. "Rapariguinha do Shopping" Released: 1981

Ar de Rock (literally Air of Rock, meaning "a rock look/appearance"; a pun on hard rock) is the debut album by Portuguese musician Rui Veloso, released in July 1980 by EMI-Valentim de Carvalho.

The album, produced by António Pinho, contains eleven songs. The songs "Chico Fininho" and "Rapariguinha do Shopping" were released as singles.

Ar de Rock was commercially successful in Portugal immediately after its release and is retrospectively considered a landmark album of Portuguese pop-rock music. Its success is considered to have triggered the so-called "boom of Portuguese rock" in the 1980s.

== Recording ==
The album was recorded in one week and mixed in three days at RPE Studios, in Lisbon, in 1980.

== Reception and legacy ==
Ar de Rock and the single "Chico Fininho" became an immediate success in Portugal. Their success is considered to have triggered in Portugal what critics call the "boom of Portuguese rock" and a wave of pop-rock hits sung in Portuguese, during the 1980s. It also earned Veloso the nickname "father of Portuguese rock".

Francisco Vasconcelos, executive manager at Valentim de Carvalho in the 1980s, said that "with Rui Veloso the politics went out and the social side entered the Portuguese pop music. With Rui Veloso we stopped listening and started feeling and dancing the music made in Portugal. The success of Ar de Rock happened because, in 1980, Portugal was a country that desperately wanted to change."

In 2000, a tribute album named 20 anos depois - Ar de Rock was released, containing covers from various notable Portuguese artists.

In 2009, Portuguese music magazine Blitz named Ar de Rock as the greatest Portuguese album of the 1980s, in a list ranking the greatest Portuguese albums of the past four decades.

== Track listing ==
No.	Title	Writer(s)	Length
1.	"Rapariguinha do Shopping"	Carlos Tê, Rui Veloso	4:25
2.	"Ai Quem Me Dera Rolar Contigo num Palheiro"	Tê, Veloso	3:34
3.	"Bairro do Oriente"	Tê, Veloso	3:48
4.	"Afurada"	Tê, Veloso	2:55
5.	"Chico Fininho"	Tê, Veloso	2:28
6.	"Sei de Uma Componesa"	Tê, Veloso	3:06
7.	"Miúda (Fora de Mim)"	António Avelar Pinho, Veloso	3:24
8.	"Saiu Para a Rua"	Tê, Veloso	4:04
9.	"No Domingo fui às Antas"	Tê, Veloso	2:45
10.	"Harmónica Azul"	Veloso	1:28
11.	"Donzela Diesel"	Pinho, Veloso	3:13
Total length:			35:10

== Personnel ==
- Rui Veloso – electric and acoustic guitar, electric piano, blues harp and vocals
- Zé Nabo – bass guitar
- Ramon Galarza – drums and percussion

== Charts ==
Chart performance for Ar de Rock
Chart (2023)	Peak position
Portuguese Albums (AFP)	21
