= Voos Domésticos =

Studio album by GNR
- Released: July 25, 2011
- Genre: Pop rock
- Length: 53:28
- Label: Capitol; EMI Music Portugal

GNR chronology
Retropolitana (2010)	Voos Domésticos (2011)	Caixa Negra (2015)

Voos Domésticos is the twelfth album by GNR. It was released by Capitol Records on July 25, 2011.

== Track listing ==
1. "Cais"
2. "Video Maria"
3. "Burro Em Pé"
4. "Sangue Oculto"
5. "Bellevue"
6. "Sete Naves"
7. "Homens Temporariamente Sós"
8. "Reis Do Roque"
9. "Vocês"
10. "Las Vagas"
11. "Asas (Eléctricas)"
12. "Voos Domésticos"
13. "Ao Soldado Desconfiado"
14. "Piloto Automático"

== Charts ==
Chart (2011)	Peak position
Portuguese Albums (AFP)	1
