= Cinema Batalha (Porto) =

Music venue and former cinema in Porto, Portugal

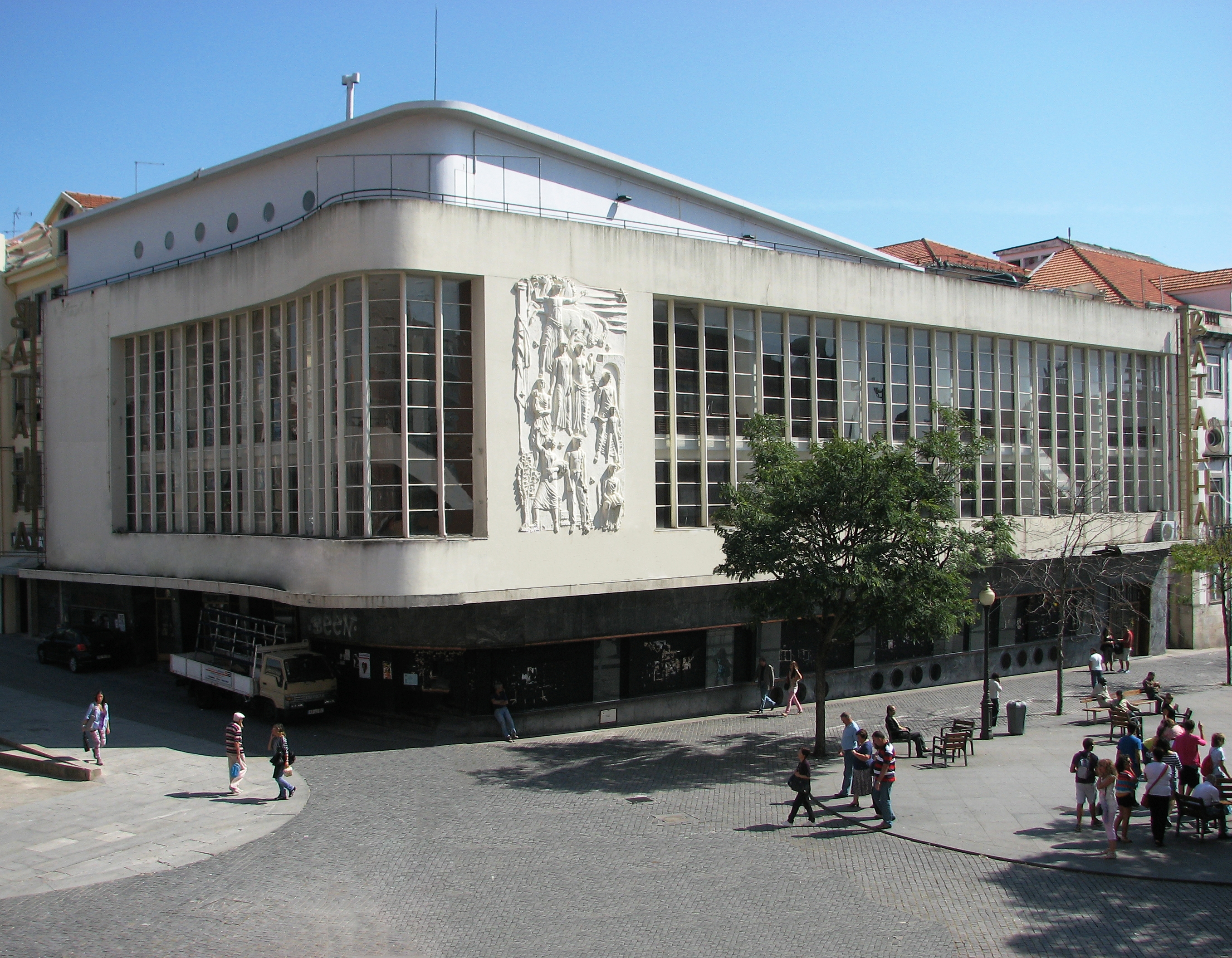
- A view of Cinema Batalha as it is seen from the Praça da Batalha
- Interactive map of the Cinema Batalha area

General information
- Type: Cinema
- Architectural style: Art Deco
- Location: Cedofeita, Santo Ildefonso, Sé, Miragaia, São Nicolau e Vitória, Porto, Portugal
- Coordinates: 41°08′44.02″N 8°36′25″W
- Opened: 29 February 1908
- Owner: Câmara Municipal do Porto

Technical details
- Material: Cement

Design and construction
- Architect: Artur Andrade

The Cinema Batalha is a Portuguese cinema and concert venue in civil parish of Cedofeita, Santo Ildefonso, Sé, Miragaia, São Nicolau e Vitória, municipality of Porto. Originally known as the Salão High-Life (High Life Cinema), it was moved from Boavista by its owners to its current location, and rebuilt by architect Artur Andrade in the Art-Deco style, re-inaugurated on 3 June 1947. After many years of success, the building and the cinema began losing customers (due to the popularity of video rental services in the 1980s and the growth of multiplex theatres in malls during the 1990s), and was closed in 2003.

Re-opened as a cultural and concert venue in 2006, the reconstruction faithfully maintained the original Art-Deco style and (along with the Coliseu do Porto) is one of the more impressive examples of the movement in Porto and Portugal.

== History ==
The upper floors of the main facade in glass

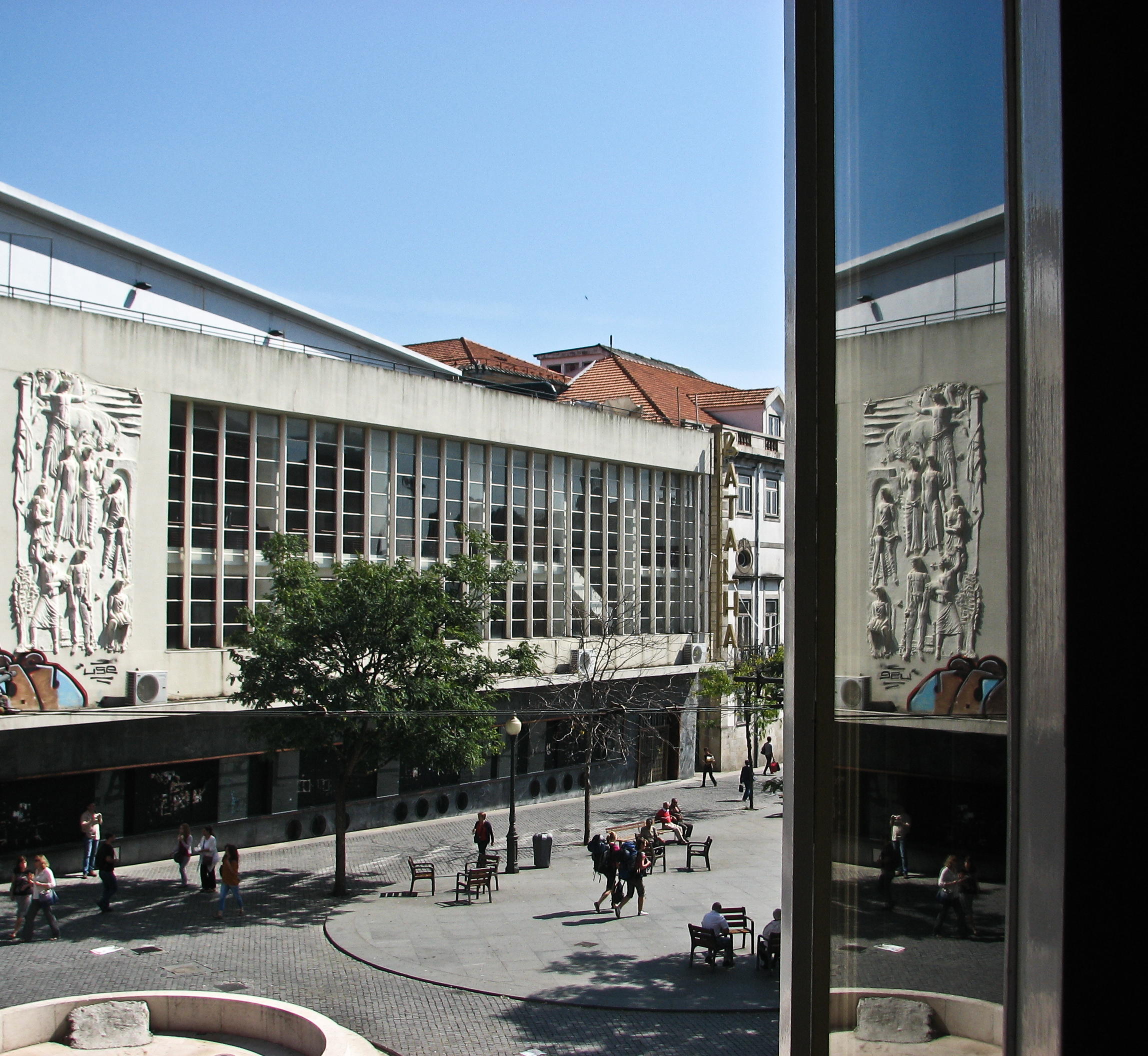
A reflection off the windows of near by buildings

The first film screenings occurred in the Salão High-Life a mere container made of wood and zinc, operated by the company Neves & Pascaud, in the Feira de São Miguel (today Boavista) in 1906. Following a short stay in the Cordoaria Garden, two years later (29 February 1908) Neves & Pascaud inaugurated the Novo Salão High-Life in the Praça da Batalha. In 1913, the name of the cinema was definitely changed to the Cinema Batalha.

The architect of Cinema Batalha was Artur Andrade (https://pt.m.wikipedia.org/wiki/Artur_Andrade)

The Coliseu do Porto was constructed in 1941, where the architects Cassiano Branco, Júlio de Brito and Mário Abreu.

The Novo Salão High-Life building was demolished in 1944, and on the 30 September of that year, the property-owners ordered the construction of the Cinema Batalha, assigning these duties to the civil engineer Bernardino de Barros Machado. The building was built between 1944 and 1947, and inaugurated on 3 June 1947. An examination of the building's construction was performed on 27 September 1948, shortly before the first screenings by the Cineclube do Porto. Due to the censorship of the time, the frescoes by Júlio Pomar and the base-relief by Américo Braga, were ordered removed.

Sometime around 1974, the studio Sala Bébé was opened in the basement of the cinema, and continued to operate until 2003 (which would later be transformed into a cafeteria).

With the growth in video rental and cost of film, in August 2000, the Cinema Batalha was closed by the owners. Two years earlier, the first attempts to save the structure had occurred (on 10 November 1998), when the municipal council proposed re-classifying the building as public heritage site. But, a year later, the same property owners signed a protocol with the municipal council to carry out public works, along with many of the local patrons.

Following six years of closure, the cinema was reopens in May 2006, under the managing of Associação Comércio Vivo, a partnership between the municipal council of Porto and commercial association. The rehabilitation consisted of a profound renovation of the main auditorium (that included new seating), air conditioning, ventilation systems and electrical installations, that cost about one million Euros. In June of that same year, there was indication that the Fantasporto international film festival could be installed temporally or permanently onsite. But, this idea was abandoned, owing to the investment necessary at the time.

On 21 December 2004, a process by the DRPorto was opened to classify the structure. A dispatch was opened on 27 January 2005, by the president of the IPPAR (Instituto Português do Património Arquitectónico). On 1 July 2008, the Regional Directorate of the Norte Region proposed classifying the structure as a Property of Public Interest (Portuguese: Imóvel de Interesse Público), and include it within the heritage protection zone that included the Capela das Almas (Chapel of Souls), Publicworks Buildings of Porto, the Coliseu do Porto, the Café Majestic and the Church of Santo Ildefonso. The descendant of the IPPAR, the consultative council of IGESPAR gave their approval on 12 November 2008, and revised the historical zone definition 20 April 2010.

On 31 December 2010, Gabinete Comércio Vivo returned the keys to the property-owners, on the last day of its management contract. Requiring maintenance, the spaces were closed, with no intended concession.

== Architecture ==
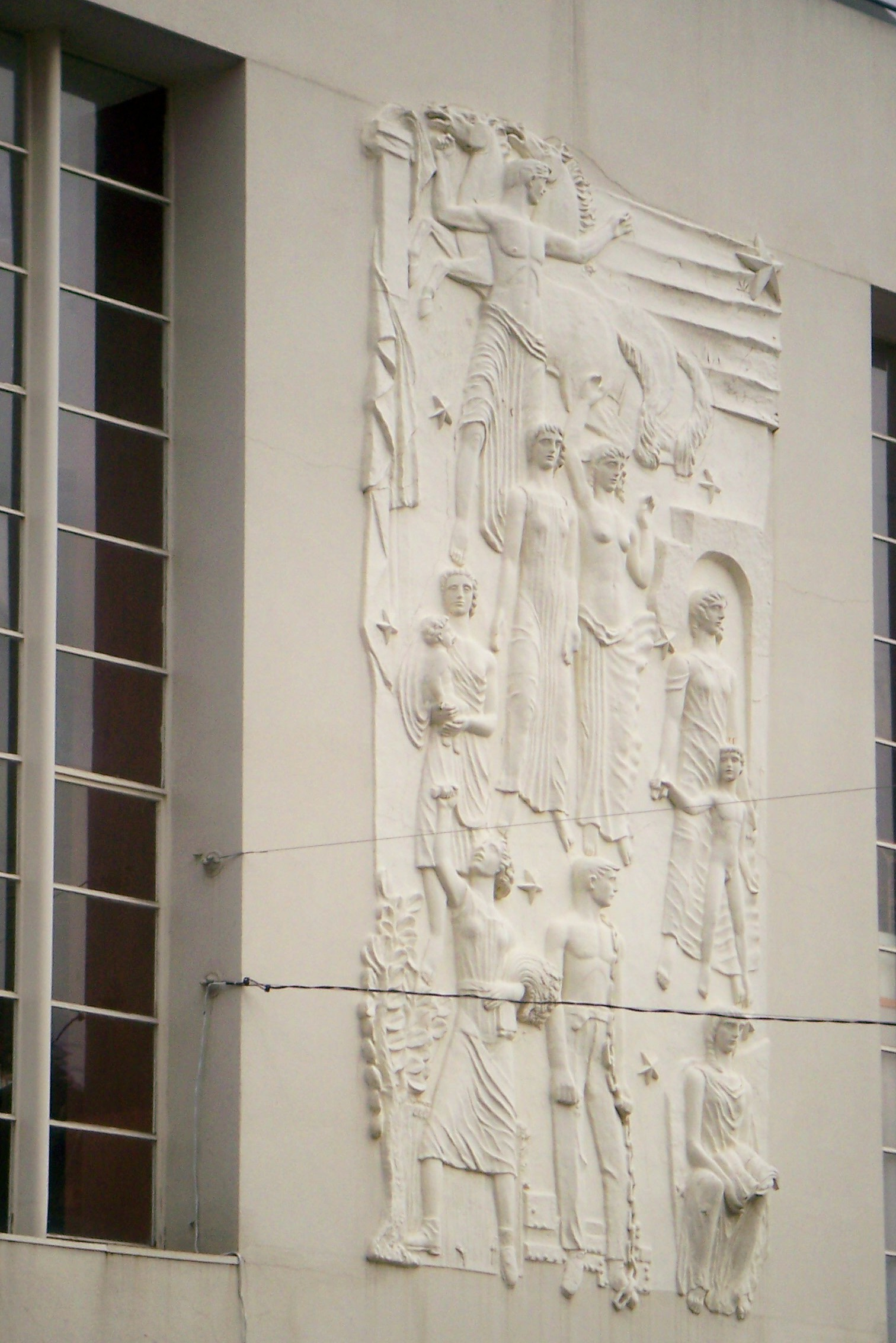
The view of the sculpture along the side facing the square

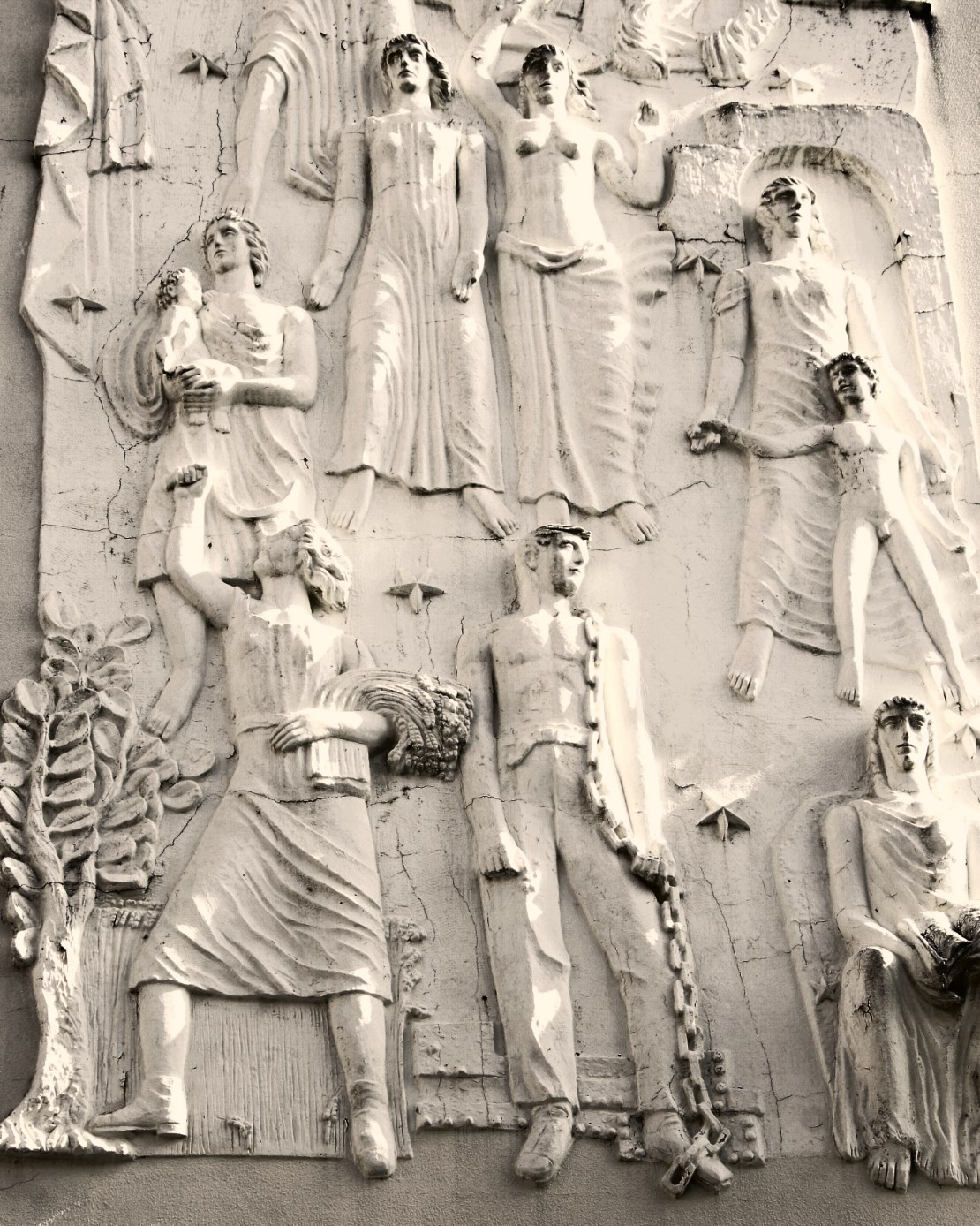
Base relief frescoes on the side of the facade

The cinema occupies a corner parcel that fronts the Praça da Batalha, alongside the Rua de Santo Ildefonso, while its form imposes on the square architecturally. The irregular square, almost an "L"-shape is defined in the north by the Church of Santo Ildefonso and contains various buildings of historical and architectural significance, including: the São João Theatre, the former Cine Águia de Douro, the Café Chave d´Ouro, the Hotel Império, the Grande Hotel da Batalha and the Palácio da Batalha, in addition the statute to D. Pedro V.

A four-story, trapezoidal structure in an Art Deco-inspired design, includes basement, recessed first-floor and remaining floors overhanging the base. The main facade is oriented west to south, marked by a curved corner and smooth stone facade, broken by a raised marble relief by Américo Braga. The upper floors are distinguished by two large window/glass surfaces on the southeast and northeast facades, broken by patterned lattice of vertical and horizontal beams. The final recessed floor, is marked by six oculi oriented towards the west, that corresponds to the projection rooms of the cinema.

From spiral staircase that emerges onto the protruding rooftop access, is a triangular terrace overlooking the square, with narrow balcony that overhangs Rua de São Ildefonso. This balcony allows access to the winching system for the advertising screens on the front facade, used for displaying the films in exhibition. On the marble surface of the ground floor, a large protruding window and glass.

=== Interior ===
The main stage and exhibition hall occupies the entity of the space, with the L-shaped foyer opening to the square and road. The ceilings of the exterior spaces, tribune and balconies are covered stucco with circular, copper lamps. Over the lateral doors that access the theatre balconies are ceramic elements in the forms of polychromatic wings, in bass relief with birds and flowers.

The three foyers, on separate floors, are linked to the main staircase, and decorated in varnished woods, glass/windows and integrated copper and metal elements. The ceilings are stuccoed with circular patterns, different on each floor (some embedded while others protruding), culminating in the final floor, where they are mixed with stars.

The floors are in black, polished marmorite, partly covered in brass inlay, with curvilinear line drawings and scattered stars.

The cinema includes two auditoriums, with one holding 950 seats (346 main, 222 mezzanine and 382 balcony) and another holding 135 visitors; two bars and a restaurant (on the terrace); and lounges.
