= Voo Nocturno =

Studio album by Jorge Palma
- Released: July 2, 2007
- Recorded: September 2006–March 2007
- Genre: Pop; rock
- Length: 45:37
- Label: EMI Music Portugal
- Producer: Flak

Jorge Palma chronology
Norte (2004)	Voo Nocturno (2007)	Voo Nocturno Ao Vivo (2008)

Voo Nocturno is the eleventh studio album by Portuguese singer-songwriter Jorge Palma. It was released on 2 July 2007 by EMI Music Portugal.

== Track listing ==
All tracks are written by Jorge Palma.

No.	Title	Length
1.	"Encosta-te a Mim"	4:22
2.	"Voo Nocturno"	4:08
3.	"Rosa Branca"	2:19
4.	"O Centro Comercial Fechou"	2:59
5.	"Olá (cá estamos nós outra vez)"	4:19
6.	"Abrir o Sinal"	3:25
7.	"Gaivota dos Alteirinhos"	3:31
8.	"Casa do Capitão"	3:22
9.	"Vermelho Redundante"	4:01
10.	"Quarteto de Corda"	3:09
11.	"Finalmente a Sós"	3:58
12.	"A Velhice" (including hidden track "Sunset Break")	5:58
Total length:		45:37

== Personnel ==
Musicians

- Jorge Palma – vocals, piano, acoustic guitars
- Marco Nunes – guitars
- Miguel Barros – bass
- André Hollanda – drums, percussion
- Miguel Ferreira – Philicorda
- Flak – guitars
- Gabriel Gomes – accordion
- Pedro Sotiry – synthesizers
- Pedro Vidal – pedal steel guitar
- Rui Alves – drums
- Paulo Gaspar – clarinet
- João Viana – bugle
- Klaus Nymark – trombone
- Jacinto Santos – tuba
- Sila Oliveira – banjo

Production

- Flak – production, recording (estúdios do Olival)
- Cajó – mixing, recording (Bebop estúdios)
- Emily Lazar – mastering
- Mário Pereira – recording (MB estúdios)
- Ricardo Fonseca – recording assistance (MB estúdios)
- Quim Monte – recording (Namouche estúdios)
- Diogo Tavares – recording (Tcha Tcha Tcha estúdios)
- Alive Vinha – cover art
- Rita Carmo – photography
- Alexandra Afonso – photography
- Jorge Palma – photography
- Sofia Silva – photography
- Marco Madruga – design, photography

== Charts ==
Chart (2007)	Peak position
Portuguese Albums (AFP)	1
