= Jorge Palma =

Portuguese singer and songwriter (1950–2026)

Jorge Palma ComIH
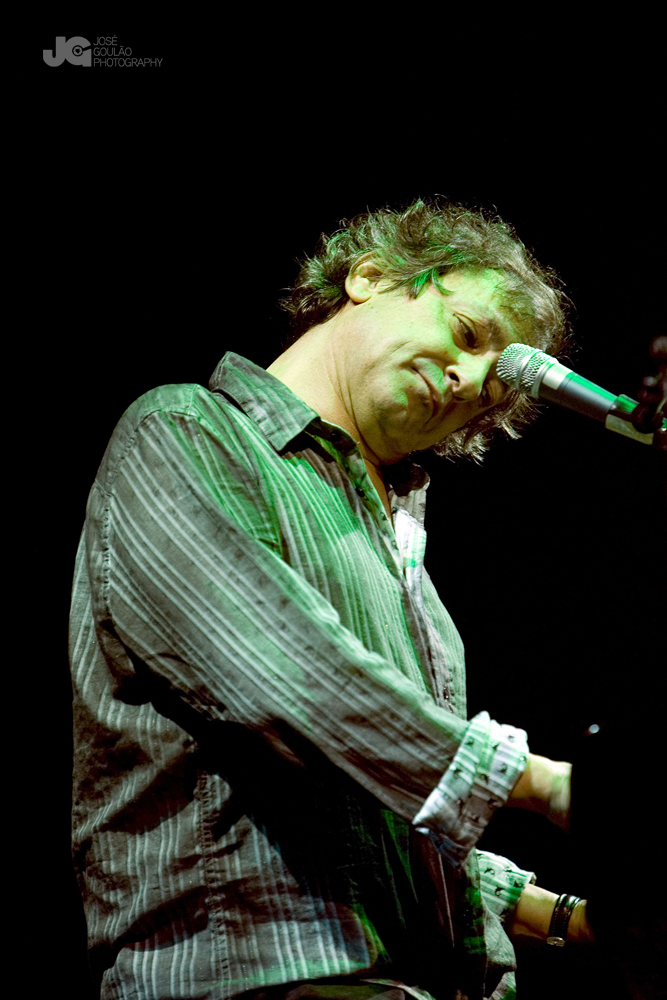
- Palma in 2007

Background information
- Born: Jorge Manuel de Abreu Palma; 4 June 1950; Lisbon, Portugal
- Died: 21 September 2026 (aged 76)
- Genres: Rock; pop
- Occupations: Singer; songwriter
- Instruments: Vocals, piano, guitar
- Years active: 1967–2026
- Labels: Decca; Diapasão; Rastilho Records; Da Nova; PolyGram; EMI; Philips Records; Warner Music
- Formerly of: Sindicato; Palma's Gang; Rio Grande; Cabeças no Ar
- Website: www.jorgepalma.pt

Jorge Manuel de Abreu Palma ComIH (4 June 1950 – 21 September 2026) was a Portuguese singer and songwriter. A well-known and acclaimed songwriter in Portugal, Palma began his solo career in 1972 and was a busker in several cities abroad before settling back in Portugal in 1982. He achieved success in the late 1980s with songs such as "Deixa-me Rir" and "Frágil", and renewed success in 2007, with the single "Encosta-te a Mim".

Palma was also a member of the bands Sindicato, Rio Grande, Cabeças no Ar, and his rock project Palma's Gang.

== Early life ==
Palma was born in Lisbon on 4 June 1950. He learned to play the piano at the same time he learned to read, aged six. At the age of eight, he performed his first piano audition at the Portuguese National Conservatory.

In 1963, aged 13, Palma finished second in a musical contest in Mallorca, Spain. He carried on his studies, first at the Camões Secondary School and later at the Colégio Infante de Sagres in Abrantes. The following year marked a turning point in his musical preferences, during which he broke with his classical influences and began to devote himself to pop-rock music.

== Musical career ==
=== 1967–1972: Career beginnings and Sindicato ===
During the Summer of 1967, in Algarve, Palma joined the band Black Boys as a keyboard player. In the following Summer, in 1968, he joined the band Jets also as a keyboard player. He also played with the bands Extravaganza and Beatnicks.

In 1969, Palma joined the rock band Sindicato, while studying Electrical Engineering in the Faculty of Sciences at the University of Lisbon. With Sindicato, he played in the first edition of the Vilar de Mouros Festival, in 1971. Sindicato released one single and a covers album, before disbanding in 1972. In that same year, Palma also dropped out of his university studies.

=== 1972–1984: Start of solo career and travels ===
Jorge Palma's solo career started in 1972 with the release of the single "The Nine Billion Names of God", based on the short story of the same name by Arthur C. Clarke, with lyrics in English. After that, he spent some time improving his lyrical writing skills in Portuguese with the famous poet and song lyricist José Carlos Ary dos Santos, and in 1973 he launched his first single in Portuguese, "A Última Canção".

To avoid conscription and the Portuguese Colonial War in Portugal's overseas territories in Africa, Palma departed to Denmark with his wife Gisela Branco, where he lived between September 1973 and June 1974 as a political exile. Following the Carnation Revolution on 25 April 1974 in Lisbon, Palma returned to Portugal.

In February 1975, Palma participated in the 12th edition of the Festival da Canção with two songs: "O Pecado Capital" (with Fernando Girão) and "Viagem". The songs finished in 7th and 8th place.

Palma's first studio album, Com Uma Viagem na Palma da Mão, was recorded and released in 1975.

In 1977, he released his second album, 'Té Já. This was followed by travels in Spain and Brazil, during which Palma played in the streets of several cities. Afterwards, he spent time in Paris, where he performed in several bars, cafés and the Paris Métro, playing songs from well-known artists such as Bob Dylan, Leonard Cohen, Paul Simon, and others.

Back in Portugal in 1979, Palma recorded and released his third album, Qualquer Coisa Pá Música. He would then spend two more years in France.

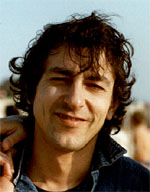
Palma in 1982

Palma returned to Portugal in 1982 and released his fourth album, Acto Contínuo.

In 1984, Palma recorded his fifth album, Asas e Penas, his first since becoming a father the year before.

=== 1985–1991: Commercial success ===
In 1985, Palma released one of the most acclaimed albums of his career, O Lado Errado da Noite. The album included the single "Deixa-me Rir", which became a success in Portugal. Music critics called it "the right side of Jorge Palma" (a play on the album name, which translates to "The wrong side of the night") and it won several prizes from the Portuguese press. The success of the album prompted a major tour across Portugal, both on the mainland and Madeira and the Azores.

In 1986, Palma finished a 3-year General Course in Piano at the Conservatório Nacional de Lisboa, and enrolled in the Advanced Studies in Piano course in the same institution. He released his seventh album, Quarto Minguante, also that year.

Three years after, in 1989, Palma released his eighth album, Bairro do Amor. The album was critically acclaimed and includes some of his most well-known songs, such as "Frágil" and the title song "Bairro do Amor".

Palma finished his piano studies in 1990. After his final exam, he was proposed by Tozé Brito, who worked for Polygram at the time, to record an album of rearrangements of his songs with only piano and voice. Palma liked the idea and recorded some of his most iconic songs played with a Steinway piano at the Valentim de Carvalho studios. The album was named Só and released in 1991. It was critically acclaimed and, in 2014, was considered one of the best Portuguese albums of all-time by music magazine Blitz.

=== 1992–2001: Palma's Gang and Rio Grande ===
After Só, Palma decided to go back to guitar-oriented rock and formed the band Palma's Gang, with members of the bands Xutos & Pontapés and Rádio Macau. The band released a live album in 1993, titled Palma's Gang: Ao Vivo no Johnny Guitar, which also explored Palma's repertoire but this time with a hard-rock sound. During the following year, Palma performed in several stages across Portugal, solo or with Palma's Gang.

In 1996, Palma accepted an invitation to join a new project, named Rio Grande, a band that included other famous Portuguese musicians, Tim (Xutos & Pontapés), João Gil (Ala dos Namorados), Rui Veloso and Vitorino. The first album of the band, released that same year, was inspired by Portuguese traditional music and became a major success. In 1997, Rio Grande released a live album recorded at the Coliseu dos Recreios in Lisbon, which included an unreleased song by Palma, "Quem És Tu De Novo".

In 1998 Palma took part in several concerts at the Expo '98 World Fair in Lisbon. He was also musical director of the play Aos Que Nasceram Depois de Nós.

Besides Palma's Gang and Rio Grande, during the 1990s Palma's musical activity also included collaborations with numerous Portuguese artists such as Censurados, Né Ladeiras, Xutos & Pontapés, Paulo Gonzo and Mafalda Veiga.

=== 2001–2026: Later years ===
After 10 years, Palma returned to solo releases with the album Jorge Palma, in 2001. The album was awarded the José Afonso Prize for best Portuguese album of 2001.

In 2002, Palma released his first solo live album, No Tempo dos Assassinos. His son Vicente took part in some of the performances. That year, he also joined the musical project Cabeças no Ar, with Rio Grande being reunited without Vitorino. They released one self-titled album.

In 2004, Palma released a new studio album, titled Norte.

In 2007, the album Voo Nocturno was released, supported by the single "Encosta-te a Mim", which became a major success in Portugal. The following year, the live album Voo Nocturno ao vivo, recorded during the tour to promote the album, was released.

In 2011, Palma released Com Todo o Respeito, his only studio album released during the 2010s.

During 2015 and 2016, Palma played shows together with Sérgio Godinho. The show at the Theatro Circo in Braga was released in the live discography studio Vivo no Theatro Circo, in 2015.

Palma released his last studio album, titled Vida, in April 2023.

== Personal life and death ==
Jorge Palma had two children. His wife was Rita Tomé, whom he married in Las Vegas in November 2008.

Jorge Palma died of a cardiac arrest on 21 September 2026, at the age of 76.

== Discography ==
=== Studio albums ===
- Com Uma Viagem Na Palma da Mão (1975)
- 'Té Já (1977)
- Qualquer Coisa Pá Música (1979)
- Acto Contínuo (1982)
- Asas e Penas (1984)
- O Lado Errado da Noite (1985)
- Quarto Minguante (1986)
- Bairro do Amor (1989)
- Só (1991)
- Jorge Palma (2001)
- Norte (2004)
- Voo Nocturno (2007)
- Com Todo o Respeito (2011)
- Vida (2023)

=== Live albums ===
- Palma's Gang: Ao Vivo no Johnny Guitar (with Palma's Gang) (1993)
- No Tempo dos Assassinos (2002)
- Voo Nocturno Ao Vivo (2008)
- Juntos – Ao vivo no Theatro Circo (with Sérgio Godinho) (2015)
- Só ao vivo (2017)
- 70 Voltas ao Sol – Ao vivo no Castelo de S. Jorge (2021)

=== Compilation albums ===
- Deixa-me Rir (1996)
- O Melhor dos Melhores (1998)
- Clássicos da Renascença (2000)
- Dá-me Lume: O Melhor de Jorge Palma (2000)
- Estrela do Mar (2004)
- A Arte e a Música de Jorge Palma (2004)
- Grandes Êxitos (2013)
- Grandes Êxitos Vol. 2 (2015)

=== Singles ===
- "The Nine Billion Names Of God" (1972)
- "A Última Canção" (1973)
- "Pecado Capital" (with Fernando Girão) (1975)
- "Viagem" (1975)
- "Deixa-me Rir" (1985)
- "Dormia Tão Sossegada" (2001)
- "Encosta-te A Mim" (2007)
- "Página em Branco" (2011)

== Honours ==
- Commander of the Order of Prince Henry (17 November 2020)
