= A Espuma das Canções =

Studio album by Rui Veloso
- Released: 28 November 2005
- Recorded: Vale de Lobos Studios, Sintra; Livingstone Studios, London; Fábrica de Chocolate Studios, Rio de Janeiro
- Genres: Rock, pop, jazz
- Length: 54:49
- Label: EMI

Rui Veloso chronology
O Concerto Acústico (2003)	A Espuma das Canções (2005)	Rui Veloso ao Vivo no Pavilhão Atlântico (2009)

A Espuma das Canções (The Foam of Songs) is the ninth studio album by Rui Veloso. It was released in November 2005 through EMI. The album was recorded in Vale de Lobos (Sintra), London and Rio de Janeiro.

Two editions were released for the album: a regular edition and a special limited edition with two bonus songs and a DVD with a film and photo galleries covering the making of the album.

== Track listing ==
All tracks are written by Carlos Tê and Rui Veloso.

No.	Title	Length
1.	"Não invoquem o amor em vão"	4:15
2.	"Amiga é um termo dúbio"	3:31
3.	"Serpente no jardim"	3:29
4.	"Canção de alterne"	3:52
5.	"A veia do poeta"	3:53
6.	"Canção de New York"	3:24
7.	"Recado a Rosana Arquete"	3:55
8.	"Brilho dental"	3:21
9.	"Top dos tops"	3:19
10.	"A invenção do canto"	4:09
11.	"Querida Jezebel"	3:51
12.	"Não queiras saber de mim"	3:57
13.	"Luz falsa"	3:39
14.	"Três minutos de atenção"	2:20
15.	"Canção de alterne" (with Nancy Vieira)	3:54
Total length:		54:49

Special Limited Edition

No.	Title	Length
16.	"Não percas o teu mistério" (bonus track)	4:12
17.	"Questão de confiança" (bonus track)	3:37
Total length:		62:38

== Charts ==
Weekly charts

Chart	Peak position
Portuguese Albums (AFP)	1
