= Lado Lunar =

Studio album by Rui Veloso
- Released: 1995
- Recorded: July–August 1995
- Studio: Vale de Lobos Studios, Sintra
- Genre: Pop rock, soft rock
- Length: 56:04
- Label: EMI-Valentim de Carvalho
- Producer: Rui Veloso

Rui Veloso chronology
Auto da Pimenta (1991)	Lado Lunar (1995)	Avenidas (1998)

Lado Lunar (Portuguese for Lunar Side) is the seventh studio by Rui Veloso, released in late 1995.

The album was recorded in Sintra, Portugal, between July and August 1995.

== Track listing ==
All music is composed by Rui Veloso and Carlos Tê

No.	Title	Length
1.	"Lado lunar"	4:32
2.	"Do Meu Vagar"	4:36
3.	"Lagos de Cristais"	4:39
4.	"Mr. Dow Jones"	4:11
5.	"Já Não Há Canções de Amor"	3:53
6.	"Benvinda Sejas Maria"	3:40
7.	"Cipreste"	4:01
8.	"Guadiana"	2:54
9.	"Melgas e Mosquitos"	4:08
10.	"Malmequer"	5:47
11.	"Beautiful People"	4:44
12.	"História Sem Moral"	3:29
13.	"Fado Pessoano"	5:30
Total length:		56:04
