= Auto da Pimenta =

Studio album by Rui Veloso
- Released: 1991
- Genre: Rock, folk rock, worldbeat
- Length: 75:50
- Label: EMI-Valentim de Carvalho
- Producer: Carlos Tê, Mário Barreiros

Rui Veloso chronology
Mingos & Os Samurais (1990)	Auto da Pimenta (1991)	Lado Lunar (1995)

Auto da Pimenta is the sixth studio album by Rui Veloso, released in 1991.

== Track listing ==
Disc 1

No.	Title	Length
1.	"Sete Partidas (Cantiga de Amigo)"	3:38
2.	"S. Miguel"	2:27
3.	"Cabo Sim Cabo Não"	4:56
4.	"Lançado"	4:52
5.	"Canção de Marinhar"	3:27
6.	"Cruzeiro do Sul"	3:50
7.	"Faena da Mar"	4:12
8.	"Calmaria"	5:08
9.	"Praia das Lágrimas"	3:58
10.	"Mulher d'Armas"	2:59
Total length:		39:27

Disc 2

No.	Title	Length
1.	"Trovas Vicentinas"	2:54
2.	"País do Gelo"	3:46
3.	"Nativa"	4:20
4.	"O Ourives Mestre João"	3:01
5.	"Má Fortuna"	3:38
6.	"Á Sombra da Tamareira"	4:05
7.	"Logo Que Passe a Monção"	5:38
8.	"Memorial"	4:33
9.	"Brizas do Restelo"	4:28
Total length:		36:23

== Certifications and sales ==
Region	Certification	Certified units/sales
Portugal (AFP)	2× Platinum	80,000^{^}
^{^} Shipments figures based on certification alone.
