= Fora de Moda =

Studio album by Rui Veloso
- Released: 1982
- Studio: Valentim de Carvalho Studios, Paço de Arcos
- Genre: Rock, blues rock
- Length: 39:38
- Label: Valentim de Carvalho
- Producer: Rui Veloso, Carlos Tê, Nuno Rodrigues

Rui Veloso chronology
Ar de Rock (1980)	Fora de Moda (1982)	Guardador de Margens (1983)

Fora de Moda (Out of Style) is the second studio album by Rui Veloso, released in 1982.

With the exception of "Bucólica" ("Bucolic"), in which he wrote a song based on a poem by Miguel Torga and "Ó Clotilde" (Carlos Tê), all of the tracks were recorded by himself and Carlos Tê

== Track listing ==
No.	Title	Length
1.	"Estrela do Rock and Roll"	4:21
2.	"Balada"	3:40
3.	"Sayago Blues"	4:28
4.	"Esta Mulher é a Minha Ruína"	3:52
5.	"Ó Clotilde"	2:20
6.	"A Minha Namorada Até Fala Estrangeiro"	4:14
7.	"Sexta-Feira Nem que Chova"	4:18
8.	"Bocejo"	3:58
9.	"Bucólica"	4:21
10.	"A Gente não lê"	4:06
