= Paulo Gonzo =

- Birth name: Alberto Ferreira Paulo
- Born: 1 November 1956 (age 68); Lisbon, Portugal
- Genres: Pop rock; soft rock
- Instruments: Vocals; guitar
- Years active: 1975–present
- Labels: Columbia; Sony Music

Alberto Ferreira Paulo (born 1 November 1956), known professionally as Paulo Gonzo, is a Portuguese singer and songwriter.

His 1997 compilation album Quase Tudo was certified 6-times Platinum by the AFP and is one of the best selling albums in Portugal, with over 240,000 units sold.

Many of his musical compositions have been used as theme songs for Portuguese telenovelas.

== Discography ==
=== Studio albums ===
Title	Year	Peak
Title	Year	POR
My Desire	1986	—
Pedras da Calçada	1992	—
Fora D'Horas	1995	—
Suspeito	1998	—
Mau Feitio	2001	—
Paula Gonzo	2005	2
Perfil	2007	2
By Request	2010	5
Só Gestos	2011	6
Duetos	2013	1
Diz-me	2017	1

=== Live albums ===
Title	Year	Peak
Title	Year	POR
Ao Vivo Unplugged	1999	25
Ao Vivo no Coliseu	2007	4

=== Compilation albums ===
Title	Year	Peak
Title	Year	POR
My Best	1993	—
Quase Tudo	1997	1
Essencial	2020	5
