= Rui Veloso (album) =

Studio album by Rui Veloso
- Released: 1986
- Recorded: April 1985 – November 1986
- Studio: Valentim de Carvalho Studios, Paço de Arcos
- Genre: Soft rock, worldbeat
- Length: 45:16
- Label: EMI; Valentim de Carvalho
- Producer: Rui Veloso

Rui Veloso chronology
Guardador de Margens (1983)	Rui Veloso (1986)	Rui Veloso Ao Vivo (1988)

Rui Veloso is the fourth album by Rui Veloso, released in late 1986.

== Recording ==
The album was recorded between April 1985 and November 1986.

== Track listing ==
All tracks were recorded by Rui Veloso and Carlos Tê with some exceptions.

No.	Title	Length
1.	"Porto Côvo"	3:50
2.	"É Triste Ser-se Crescido"	4:54
3.	"Cavaleiro Andante"	3:43
4.	"Directo à Cabeça"	5:15
5.	"Valsinha das Medalhas"	3:50
6.	"A Origem do Mal"	2:39
7.	"O Negro do Rádio de Pilhas"	4:20
8.	"Porto Sentido"	4:25
9.	"Beirã"	4:46
10.	"Champanhe"	4:50
11.	"África"	2:44
Total length:		45:16

== Certifications and sales ==
Region	Certification	Certified units/sales
Portugal (AFP)	2× Platinum	80,000^{^}
^{^} Shipments figures based on certification alone.
