= Rui Veloso =

Portuguese singer-songwriter (born 1957)

Rui Veloso ComIH
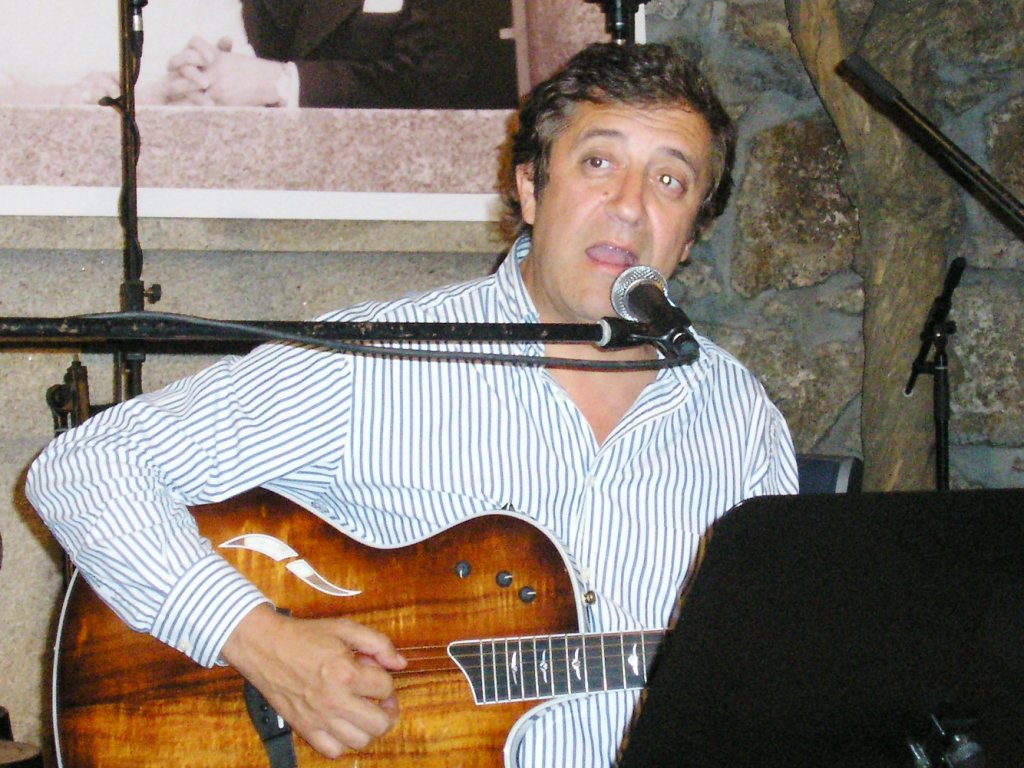
- Rui Veloso in 2006, in Porto

Background information
- Born: Rui Manuel Gaudêncio Veloso; 30 July 1957 (age 68); Lisbon, Portugal
- Genres: Rock; blues rock; soft rock; pop rock
- Instruments: Vocals, guitar, piano, harmonica
- Years active: 1979–present
- Labels: EMI; Valentim de Carvalho
- Formerly of: Rio Grande; Cabeças no Ar
- Website: ruiveloso.pt

Rui Manuel Gaudêncio Veloso ComIH (born 30 July 1957) is a Portuguese singer-songwriter and musician. Commonly called "The father of Portuguese rock" (Portuguese: O pai do rock português), Veloso was a major figure in the boom of Portuguese rock music in the 1980s. His 1980 debut album Ar de Rock, which includes the hit single "Chico Fininho", is considered a landmark of Portuguese rock. During the 1980s and 1990s, Veloso released numerous other successful singles and albums in Portugal.

An unconditional lover of blues music, he played with B.B. King several times in King's shows in Portugal.

== Early life ==
Rui Veloso was born in Lisbon on 30 July 1957. His father, Aureliano Veloso (25 February 1924 - 12 June 2019), was the first democratically elected mayor of Porto after the Carnation Revolution, in 1977. Aureliano's brother, António, was a leading general in the years after the revolution.

Veloso grew up in Porto and started to play harmonica at the age of 6. In 1972, aged 15, he started to play guitar. He began developing a passion for blues music from an early age, having Eric Clapton, Muddy Waters, B.B. King and Bob Dylan as influences. In his youth, Veloso was part of the Magara Blues Band, singing songs in English and performing in bars and friends' houses.

Veloso met Carlos Tê in 1976, with whom he would develop a successful songwriting partnership during his career.

== Musical career ==
=== 1979–1989: Ar de Rock, Fora de Moda, Guardador de Margens and Rui Veloso ===
In 1979, Rui Veloso signed his first contract with Valentim de Carvalho. The following year, he was joined by the backup band A Banda Sonora, with Zé Nabo on bass and Ramon Galarza on drums, for the recording of his first album. In July 1980, Veloso's debut album Ar de Rock is released.

Ar de Rock and the single "Chico Fininho" became an immediate success in Portugal. According to Francisco Vasconcelos, executive manager at Valentim de Carvalho in the 1980s, "with Rui Veloso the politics went out and the social side entered the Portuguese pop music. With Rui Veloso we stopped listening and started feeling and dancing the music made in Portugal. The success of Ar de Rock happened because, in 1980, Portugal was a country that desperately wanted to change." The success of the album is considered to have triggered a wave of pop-rock hits sung in Portuguese in Portugal during the 1980s. In September 1980, Rui Veloso e a Banda Sonora were the opening act for The Police at the Estádio do Restelo.

In 1982, Veloso released his second album, Fora de Moda, also with A Banda Sonora. It was followed by Guardador de Margens in 1983.

The album Rui Veloso was released in 1986, including the songs "Porto Côvo", "Porto Sentido" and "Cavaleiro Andante". The album was certified platinum by the AFP, and Veloso embarks afterwards on his first major national tour, a 61-date tour that included shows at the Coliseu dos Recreios in Lisbon and the Coliseu do Porto. Veloso's shows at the Coliseu do Porto in June 1987 were recorded for his first live album, Ao Vivo, released in 1988.

=== 1990–1999: Mingos & Os Samurais, Auto da Pimenta, Lado Lunar and Avenidas ===
In March 1990, Veloso was invited to play in B.B. King's two shows at the Coliseu do Porto. The invitation came after one of Veloso's partners, Vítor Miguéis, contacted King's team and suggested the collaboration. He played again with King in July that year at the Casino Estoril and later in 1996 and 1998, in Lisbon.

Veloso's fifth studio album was Mingos & Os Samurais, released in 1990, a concept double-album about the life of a suburban band during the 1960s and 70s. The songs "Não Há Estrelas no Céu" and "A Paixão (Segundo Nicolau da Viola)" become hugely successful. It is Veloso's most commercially successful album, being certified 7× platinum by the AFP and having sold 280,000 copies by early 1992. This was, at the time, a record for a Portuguese artist.

In 1991, Veloso releases the album Auto da Pimenta. Also that year, Veloso was the opening for Paul Simon's concert at the José Alvalade stadium, for an audience of over 50,000.

In the period between 1991 and 1994, Veloso performed numerous concerts in international venues for the Portuguese communities abroad. He played in Brussels, Toronto, Seville (at the Expo 92), Switzerland, Belgium, Luxembourg, Netherlands and Paris.

In 1992, Veloso recorded with Nuno Bettencourt from Extreme, in the United States, the single "Maubere", in solidarity with the East Timor people during the Indonesian occupation.

His seventh album, Lado Lunar, was released in 1995. In 1996, he joined the musical project Rio Grande, a band that included other famous Portuguese musicians: Tim (Xutos & Pontapés), João Gil (Ala dos Namorados), Jorge Palma and Vitorino. The first album of the band, released that same year, became a major success. In 1997, Rio Grande released a live album recorded at the Coliseu dos Recreios in Lisbon.

In 1998, he released his eighth studio album, Avenidas.

=== 2000–present: Espuma das Canções and Rui Veloso e Amigos ===
Veloso's first compilation album was released in 2000, titled O Melhor de Rui Veloso - 20 Anos Depois.

In 2002, he joined the musical project Cabeças no Ar, which was basically a reunion of Rio Grande without Vitorino. They released one self-titled album.

in 2005, Veloso released Espuma das Canções, his ninth studio album.

His latest studio album, Rui Veloso e Amigos, was released in 2012, and features collaboration with numerous Portuguese artists, such as Camané, Carlos do Carmo, Jorge Palma, and Expensive Soul.

== Discography ==
=== Studio albums ===
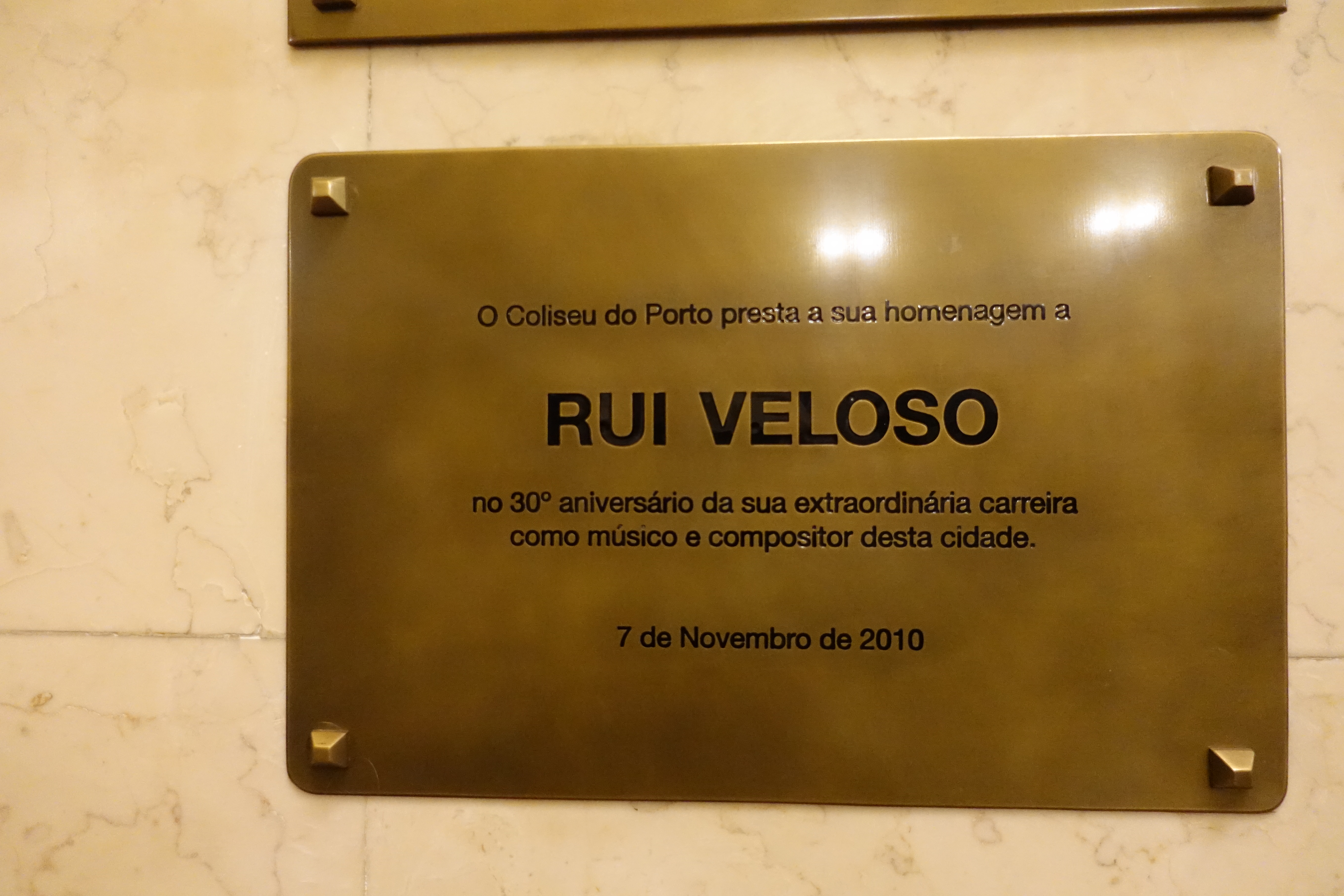
Plaque in honour of Veloso at the Coliseu do Porto, marking 30 years of his career in 2010

- Ar de Rock (1980)
- Fora de Moda (1982)
- Guardador de Margens (1983)
- Rui Veloso (1986)
- Mingos & Os Samurais (1990)
- Auto da Pimenta (1991)
- Lado Lunar (1995)
- Avenidas (1998)
- A Espuma das Canções (2005)
- Rui Veloso e Amigos (2012)

=== Compilation albums ===
- O Melhor de Rui Veloso - 20 Anos Depois (2000)
- Essencial (2014)
- O Melhor de Rui Veloso (2015)

=== Live albums ===
- Rui Veloso Ao Vivo (1988)
- O Concerto Acústico (2003)
- Ao Vivo no Pavilhão Atlântico (2009)

=== Video albums ===
- O Concerto Acústico (2003)
- Ao Vivo no Pavilhão Atlântico (2009)

== Honours ==
- Knight of the Order of Prince Henry (10 June 1992)
- Commander of the Order of Prince Henry (30 January 2006)
