= Café Majestic =

Café in Porto, Portugal

Coordinates: 41.1472382°N 8.6087682°W

- Industry: Hospitality, restaurants
- Founded: 1922
- Headquarters: Porto, Portugal

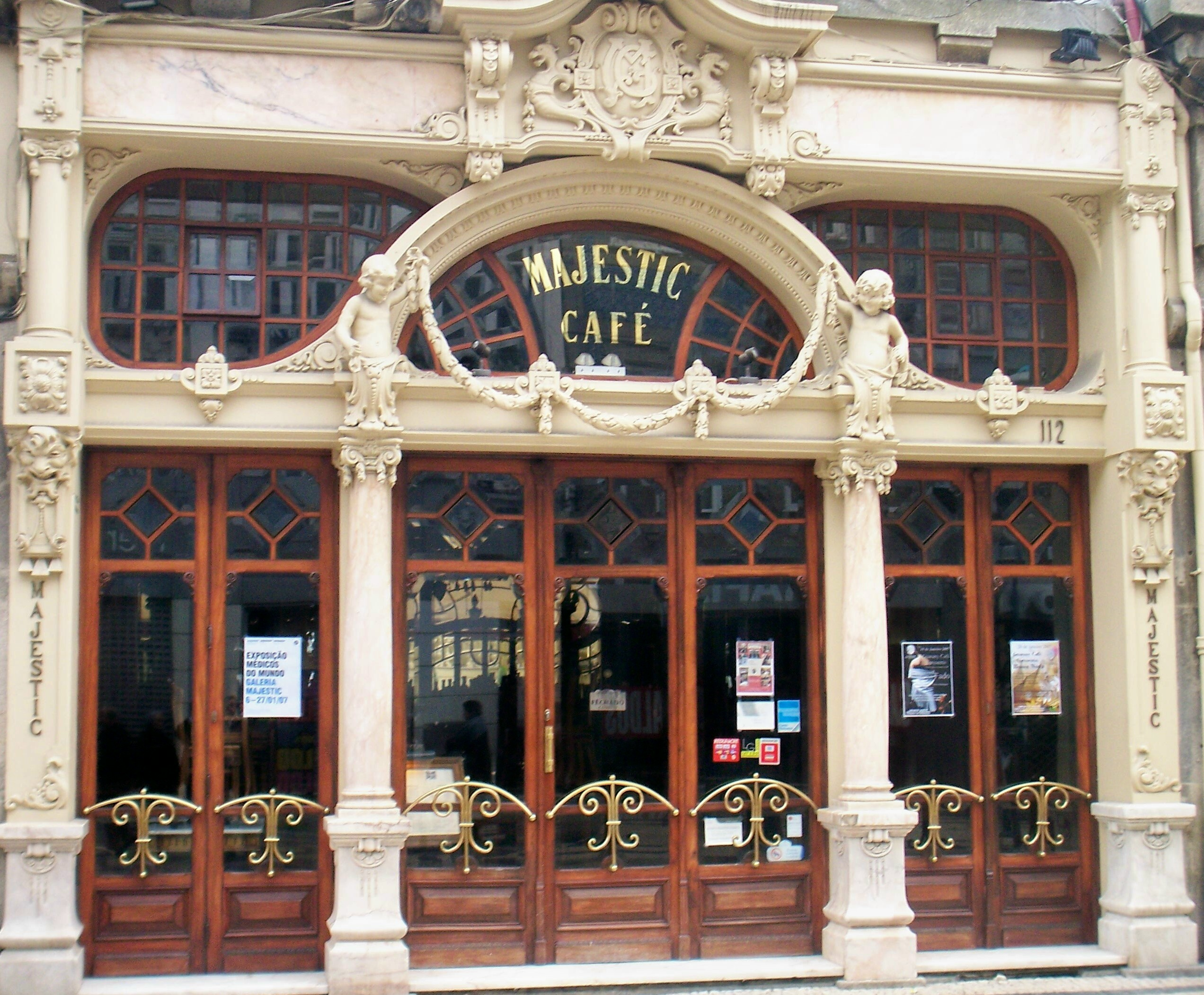
Main façade, Café Majestic.

Café Majestic is an historic café, located at Rua de Santa Catarina, in Porto, Portugal.

The building is from the Art Nouveau period, reminiscent of Parisian cafés at the time.

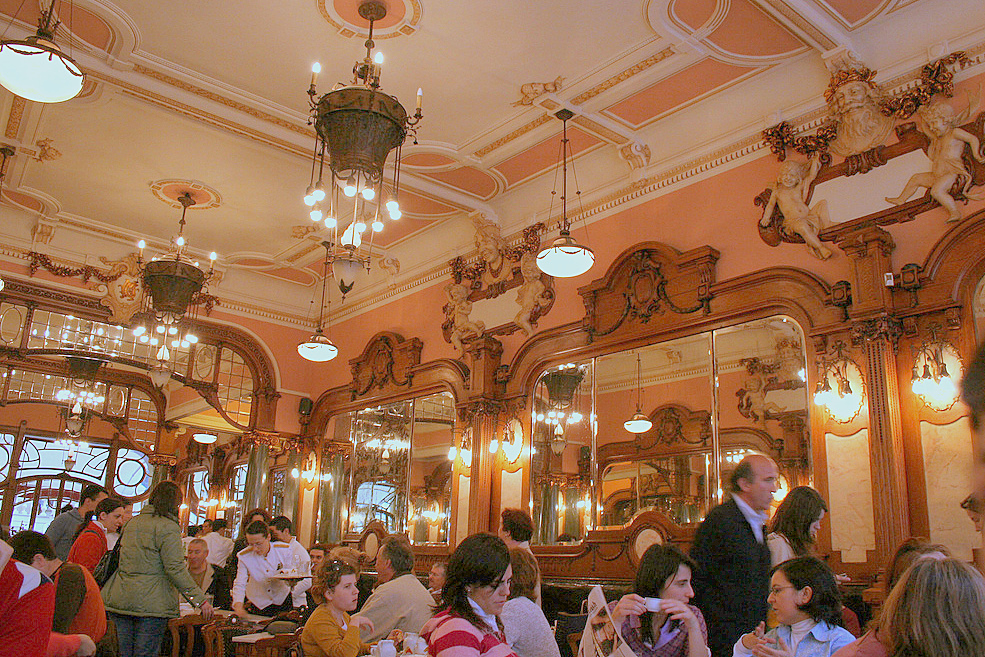
Café interior.

== History ==
The cafe originally opened in 1922. It was designed to look like a Parisian cafe in the Art Nouveau style by the architect José Pinto de Oliveira. It was originally an exclusive and upmarket cafe that acted as a place for the elitist members of society to meet.

== Present day ==
The café went through decades of decline, until it was considered a building of national historical interest in 1983. After major restoration works, it reopened in July 1994 in the original Belle Époque style. Since the 1980s it has become iconic in Porto and is a popular destination in the city.

== Bibliography ==
- Café Majestic. Porto: Ed. Quiosque.org, 2006.
- Porto de Encontro n.º 34, special edition 2001, Porto municipality
