= Coliseu do Porto =

Theatre and cinema in Porto, Portugal

Coliseum of Porto
- Coliseu do Porto
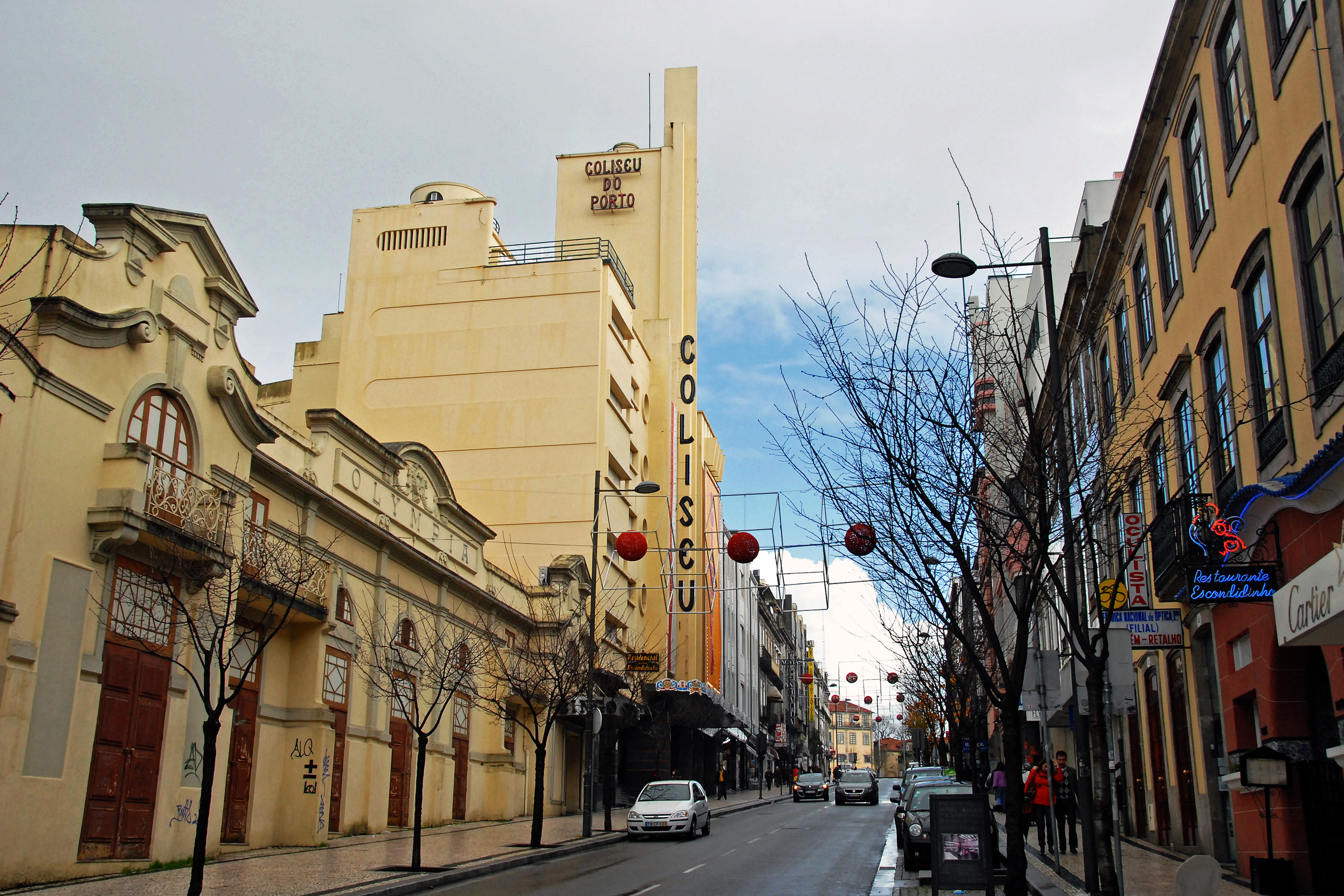
- Interactive map of the Coliseum of Porto area
- Alternative names: Coliseu Porto Ageas

General information
- Type: Theater
- Architectural style: Streamline Moderne
- Location: Cedofeita, Santo Ildefonso, Sé, Miragaia, São Nicolau e Vitória, =, Porto, Portugal
- Coordinates: 41°8′48.4″N 8°36′19.84″W
- Opened: 19 December 1941
- Owner: Câmara Municipal do Porto

Technical details
- Material: Reinforced concrete

Design and construction
- Architect: Cassiano Branco

Other information
- Seating capacity: 4000

Website
- www.coliseudoporto.pt

The Coliseum of Porto (Portuguese: Coliseu do Porto) is a Portuguese theatre and concert venue in the municipality of Porto, in northern Portugal, with a capacity for a standing audience of 4000. A leading venue for music and cultural events in Porto, together with Batalha Cinema, the Coliseu is an example of Portuguese Streamline Moderne and Art Deco styles in the city of Porto.

== History ==
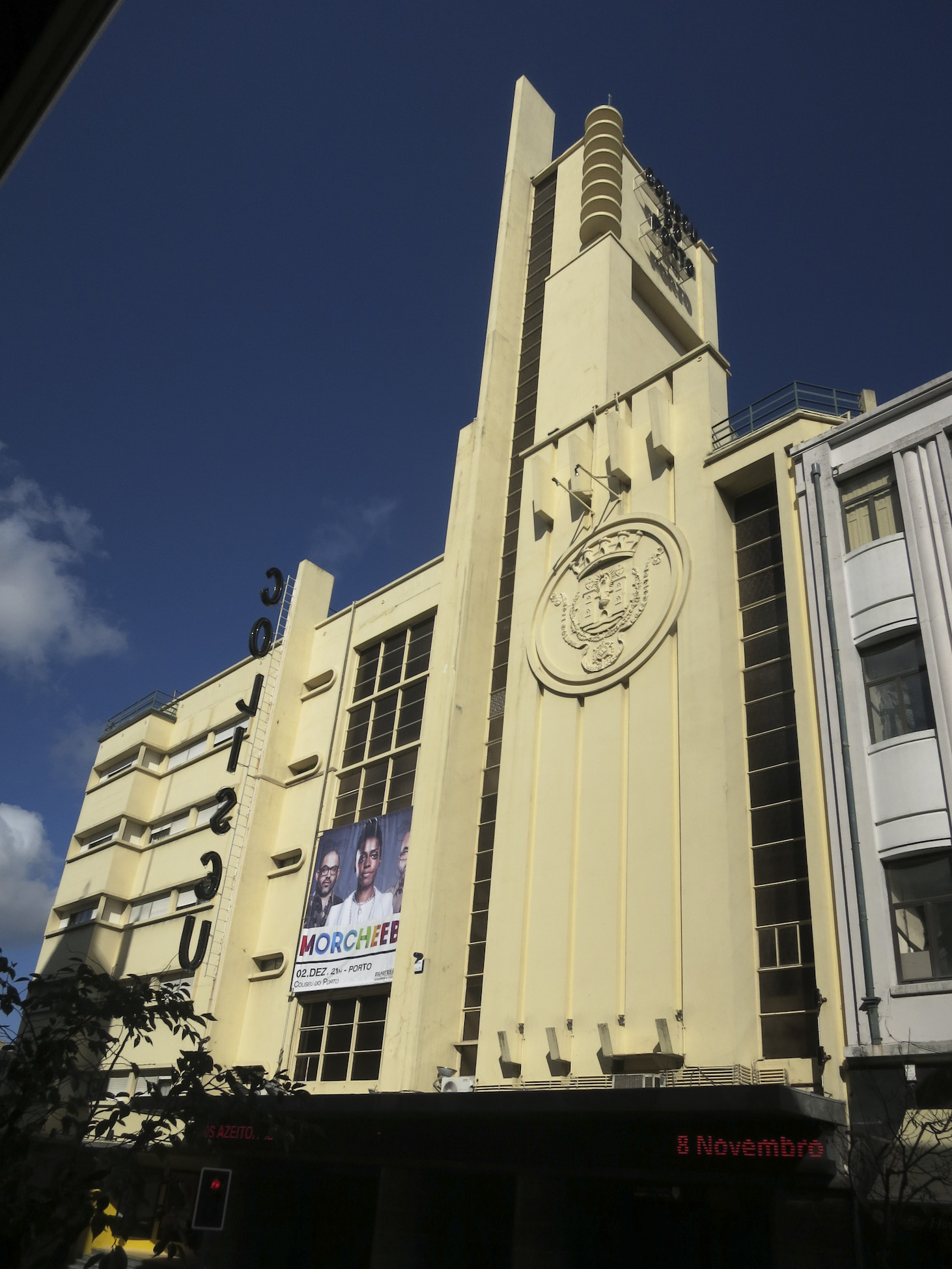
The front facade and tower of the Coliseum

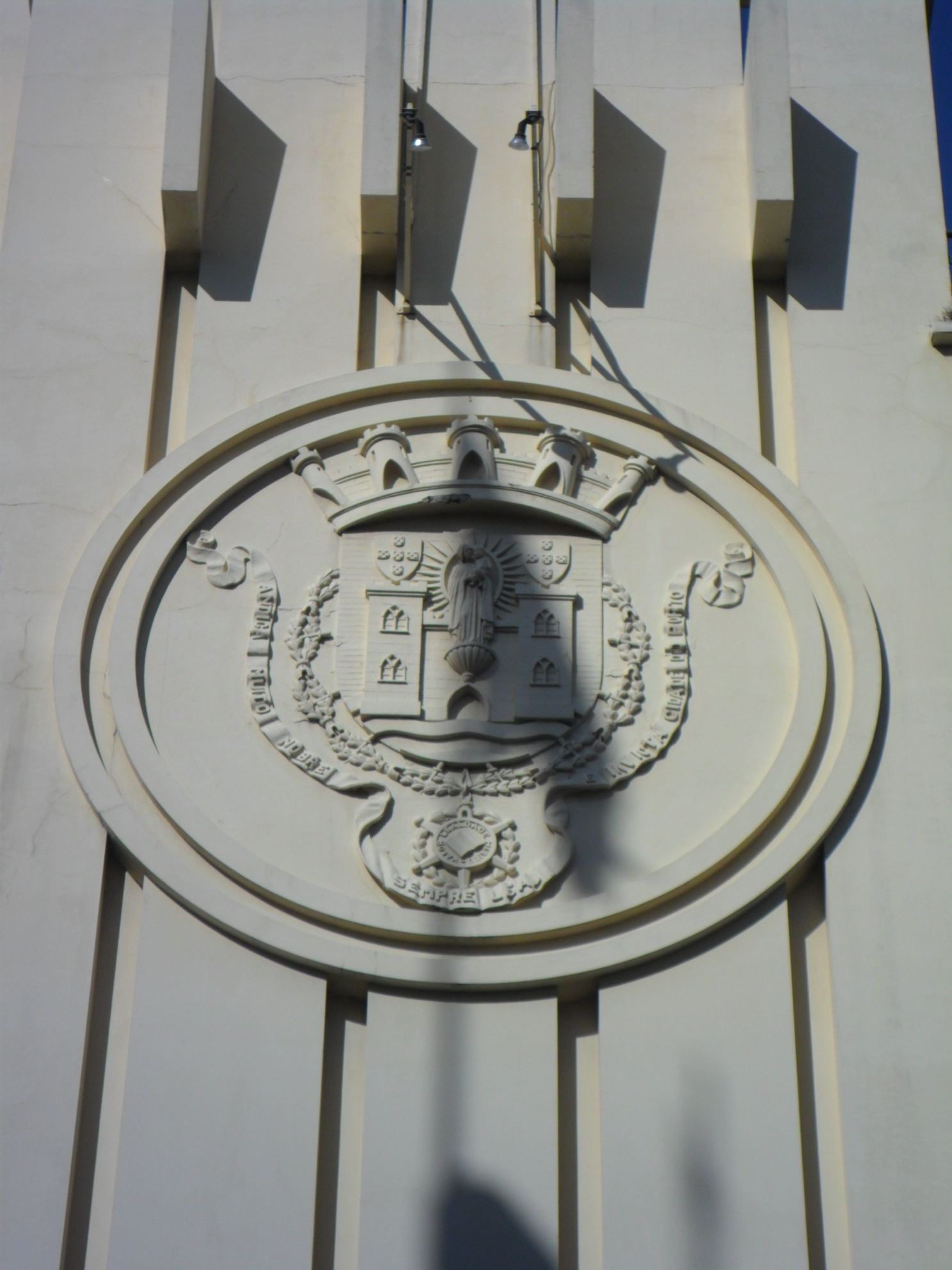
Detail of the municipal seal identifying it as managed by the Municipal Council of Porto

On 17 March 1908, the Garden-hall Passos Manuel was inaugurated. Architect Mário de Abreu designed the interior and made alterations to the principal hall, staircase and the tower facade, which was covered in windows, and removed the original neon green, red and white that accompanied the original structure at the time of its opening. The Garden-hall Passos Manuel was the first local public hall in the city and "was the point of encounter for Portuense society, an elegant local, with sophisticated decorations, with ample gardens and luminous fountains that proportioned all types of entertainment. It had the capacity for 700 people (Coliseu do Porto, 60 anos)".

In 1911, the hall was renovated, which included a garden and esplanade, party hall, pavilion restaurant, hall and small theatre.

By 1937 however, there were already complaints that demand exceeded the capacity of the complex, and the first plans to construct a grand, modern events hall were begun by architect José Porto. In 1938, the Garden-hall Passos Manuel was shuttered and demolished. The following year, Cassiano Branco assumed the position of principal architect for the new project, with the assistance of Júlio de Brito. The construction of the coliseum was a troubled endeavor, that risked the careers of various architects, among them José Porto (who abandoned the project), Dutch architect, Jan Wils (who made designs for the theatre) and Júlio de Brito (whose projects were rejected by the Porto Comissão de Estática). However, since he was connected to the Companhia de Seguros Garantia, proprietor of the Garden-hall Passos Manuel (later the Coliseu), Brito continued his association with the project. Charles Ciclis, who authored various projects in Parisian theatres, was also invited by Cassiano Branco to work on the Coliseum project. Of his interior designs, apparently only the candelabras and doors were included in the final design, although Ciclis was never remunerated. The completed building opened on 19 December 1941.

With changing tastes and the advent of popular cinema, the old concert hall was transformed by 1971 into a cinema/studio.

By 1981, there was a proposal to classify the building, during the 2nd Congress of the Association of Portuguese Architects. But, the first initiatives were open on 11 December 1987, by the IPPC, supported by the 18 December dispatch by the Vice-President.

In 1995, the Empresa Artística, SA/Grupo Aliança-UAP, sold the coliseum to IURD, the Brazilian Universal Church of the Kingdom of God (on 5 October). This news boosted an unprecedented movement of indignation and revolt on the part of the Portuenses. Various artist and institutions such as the municipal council, civil governor and public, reacted unanimously against the announced end of the coliseum. This move resulted in the establishment of the Associação "Amigos do Coliseu do Porto", who helped stop its sale and protect the building. On 28 September 1996, a public deed for the purchase of the coliseum by the municipal council, which included the cinema Passos Manuel, the Garden-hall, attic hall and a lithography for 680,000 contos. During an event, a fire started in the coliseum that completely destroyed the stage, principal hall and dressing rooms. The recuperated building was reopened on 17 December 1996.

On 10 September 1998, the Vice-President of IPPAR at the time, re-confirmed the IPPAR's 1987 intent to classify the building. This process had advanced little in the intermittent years, so that by 12 September 2005, there was a proposal by the DRPorto to classify the building as an Imóvel de Interesse Público (Property of Public Interest). This was later included in the far larger special protection zone that included the buildings of the public works department, Chapel of Almas, Café Majestic, Church of Saint Ildefonso and Cinema Batalha, which was later approved by the consultive council of IGESPAR (12 November), and supported on 29 September 2010, by the National Council of Culture. The Secretary of State for Culture ratified its classification as a Property of Public Interest.

In September 2015, a professional ballet troop became the resident company at the Coliseu, the Balleteatro.

Between 1997 and 2001, there systematic changes to the buildings interiors, that included the substitution of the electrical systems, the construction of new washrooms on all floors, the substitution of water supply, security and fire protection systems, the repair of the roof, recuperation of the dressing rooms on five floors and the elaboration of a new aesthetic with the building. Moving and scenic lighting equipment were upgraded, the heating network was recovered and improved, an electronic subtitling system (with simultaneous translation in two languages) and an electronic ticket office were installed. The auditorium was completely rebuilt to improve the acoustics and the visibility of the spectators, while a warehouse was built under the auditorium. A second orchestra pit and a new circus track were installed on a 13 metres (43 ft) hydraulic lifting plate.

In July 2022, the Porto City Council unanimously approved the concession of the Coliseum to private companies. Since February 2023, Miguel Guedes has been the chairman of Coliseu do Porto.

== Architecture ==
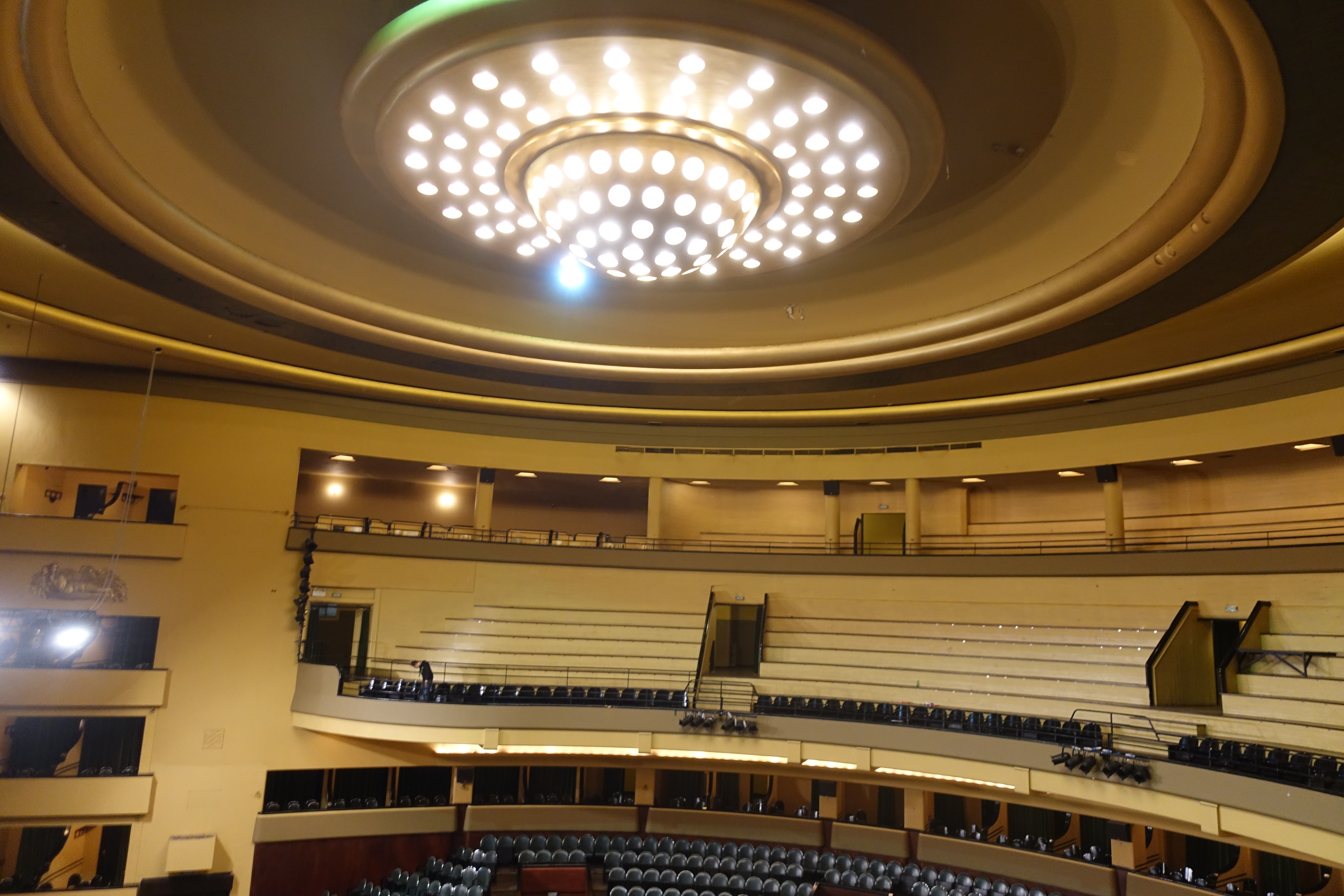
A view of the chandalier in the main auditorium

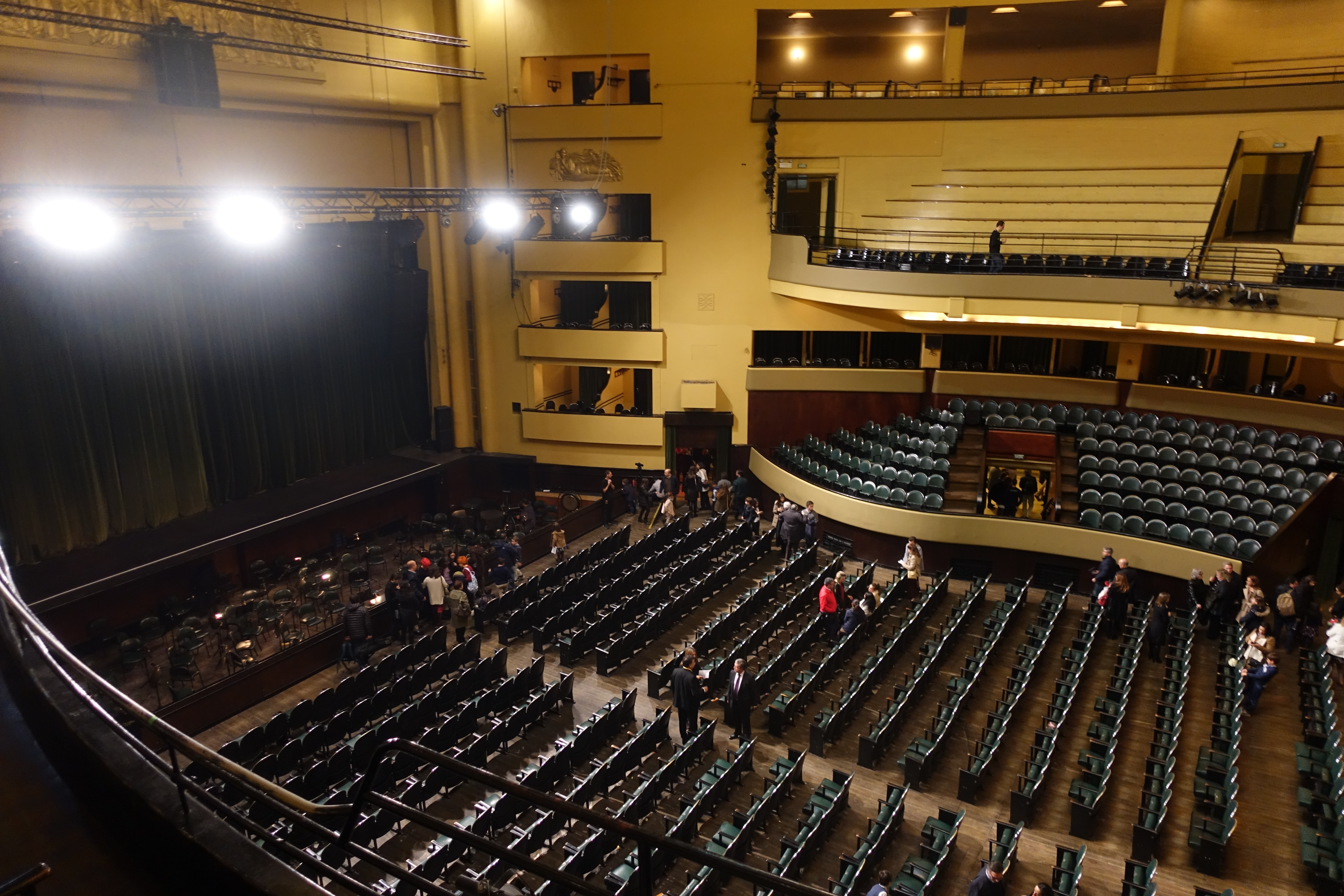
The stage and general seating in the auditorium

Located in the city of Porto, it is flanked by other buildings, implanted on land with an accentuated slope from east to west; it is addorsed to the Olímpia Cinema (in the west) and various four-storey residential/commercial buildings in the west. Opposite coliseum is a modernist garage. The main auditorium has a capacity for a standing audience of 4000 people and 3000 seated, that includes the 1st and 2nd stalls, the dress circle, the boxes, upper circle, reserved and general gallery. There is also the smaller Ático Room, with capacity for 300 people, suitable for smaller performances, conferences and symposia.
