= GNR (band) =

Portuguese pop rock band

- GNR at Festival Entre Portas, 2026

Background information
- Also known as: Grupo Novo Rock
- Origin: Porto, Portugal
- Genres: Alternative rock, new wave, pop rock, post-punk
- Years active: 1980–present
- Labels: EMI; Valentim de Carvalho; Capitol Records
- Members: Rui Reininho; Jorge Romão; Tóli César Machado
- Past members: Alexandre Soares; Vítor Rua; Mano Zé; Manuel Ribeiro; Herminio Tavares; Zezé Garcia
- Website: www.osgnr.com

GNR is a Portuguese pop rock band formed in Porto in 1980 and currently consists of vocalist Rui Reininho, bassist Jorge Romão and the only remaining founding member drummer Tóli César Machado. The formation of the group, that shares its acronym (Grupo Novo Rock, Portuguese for New Rock Group) with the Guarda Nacional Republicana, coincided with the so-called Boom of Portuguese Rock that took place during the eighties, of which GNR are one of the few survivors to this day.

The band was formed by Alexandre Soares, Vítor Rua and Tóli César Machado and underwent several line-up changes throughout its long career. Despite the successive changes to their line-up, a series of internal conflicts and significant variations in their style of music, the band was able to reinvent itself in order to keep their success throughout the decades, growing a dedicated fanbase and slowly becoming the symbol of the Portuguese rock scene.

== History ==
=== 1980-81: Formation and early years ===
The band's first concert was in 1981, in the Church of Carvalhido, Porto, and officially marked the beginning of GNR.

== Discography ==
=== Studio albums ===
- Independança (1982)
- Defeitos Especiais (1984)
- Os Homens Não Se Querem Bonitos (1985)
- Psicopátria (1986)
- Valsa dos Detectives (1989)
- Rock in Rio Douro (1992)
- Sob Escuta (1994)
- Mosquito (1998)
- Popless (2000)
- Do Lado dos Cisnes (2002)
- Retropolitana (2010)
- Voos Domésticos (2011)
- Caixa Negra (2015)
