= Ala dos Namorados =

Portuguese band

- Origin: Portugal
- Genre: Pop rock
- Years active: 1993–present
- Label: EMI
- Spinoffs: Filarmónica Gil
- Members: João Monge; Manuel Paulo; José Moz Carrapa
- Past members: João Gil; Nuno Guerreiro

Ala dos Namorados is a Portuguese band created in 1993. Its duet "Solta-se o Beijo" with Sara Tavares reached platinum.

== Band members ==
=== Nuno Guerreiro ===
From the inception until 2025, the band's lead vocalist was Nuno Guerreiro (1972–2025). Possessing a countertenor vocal register - quite unique in the Portuguese pop panorama at the time of his rise to fame - he distinguished himself in soul and rhythm & blues sounds. Nuno Guerreiro was born in Loulé, in the Portuguese southern region of Algarve, on 5 September 1972. He was raised in Loulé until moving Lisbon at the age of 16 to attend the Conservatory Dance School. During the following years, he cultivated the art of dance, until fate made him cross paths with the guitarist Carlos Paredes. In 1992, Nuno Guerreiro attended a rehearsal of a Paredes' show at Teatro São Luiz (Lisbon), during which he began to sing, catching the guitarist's attention, who soon invited him to sing in his show. Possessing a voice with a unique register in the Portuguese musical panorama, he joined the formation of Ala dos Namorados as lead vocalist at the invitation of musicians Manuel Paulo and João Gil (formerly a member of Trovante). In order to cultivate his countertenor voice, Guerreiro attended singing lessons with Maria Cristina Castro, one of the best Portuguese soprano singers. Outside of Ala dos Namorados, Nuno Guerreiro recorded, in 1999, the album Carta de Amor, released by EMI Japan. Recorded with the Japanese conductor and producer Akira Senju, this record is composed of classics of Anglo-American popular song, such as "When The Saints Go Marchin In", "Amazing Grace" and "Greensleeves". Carta de Amor also includes an interpretation of "Perdidamente", a poem by Florbela Espanca, put to music by João Gil for a great Trovante hit. At the Lisbon World Exposition in 1998, he performed in a show in which he recreated Amália Rodrigues, Peter Gabriel, Cole Porter, and Marlene Dietrich. The singer's second solo album, Tento Saber, was released in 2002. The title was changed in the Japanese version to "Give me Peace". The record is very intimate and was presented live, in acoustic format, all over the country. Nuno Guerreiro was openly gay and was a victim of domestic violence in a past romantic relationship.

Guerreiro died in Lisbon on 17 April 2025.

== Albums ==
- 1994 - Ala dos Namorados
- 1995 - Por Minha Dama
- 1996 - Alma
- 1999 - Solta-se o Beijo (reached Platinum)
- 2000 - Cristal (reached Gold)
- 2004 - Ao Vivo no S. Luíz (DVD)
- 2007 - Mentiroso Normal
