= Valentim de Carvalho =

- Parent company: Grupo JRP SGPS
- Founded: 1914; 112 years ago
- Founder: Eduard Neupart
- Genre: Various
- Location: Estrada de Paço de Arcos 26, 2770-129, Oeiras, Lisbon, Portugal
- Official website: www.valentim.pt

Valentim de Carvalho (European Portuguese pronunciation: [vɐlẽˈtĩ dɨ kɐɾˈvaʎu]) is a Portuguese record label founded in 1914.

== History ==
The company started selling phonograph, musical instruments and music since its 1914 foundation at the Rua da Assunção, Lisbon.

It distributes EMI in Portugal since 1920. VDC also carved names in the Portuguese music industry like Amália Rodrigues, António Variações, Fernanda Maria, and, most recently, Os Pontos Negros. It has two sub-labels: Popular and NorteSul. In 1994, the company was merged with EMI to form EMI-Valentim de Carvalho and also distributed UMG Portugal. It became EMI Music Portugal in 2006 and in 2013, the record label became a part of Parlophone and its Portuguese EMI catalogue are now under Warner Music Group.

As of 2014, JRP Group owns VdC. VdC now sells books aside from CDs and DVDs.

== Labels distributed ==
- EMI
- UMG Portugal
- Disney Music Group
- RCA Records
- N’Gola
- Som Livre
- Zomba Group of Companies
- His Master's Voice
- Decca Records
