= O Paraíso =

Studio album by Madredeus
- Released: October 20, 1997
- Recorded: June–August 1997
- Studios: Condulmer Studios, Venice
- Genres: Folk, world music
- Length: 71:27
- Labels: EMI, Valentim de Carvalho
- Producer: Pedro Ayres Magalhães

Madredeus chronology
Ainda (1995)	O Paraíso (1997)	O Porto (1998)

O Paraíso (English: "The Paradise") is the fifth studio album by Portuguese group Madredeus. It was released on 20 October 1997 by EMI-Valentim de Carvalho.

It is the first Madredeus album with their second lineup, as a quintet, with Carlos Maria Trindade replacing Rodrigo Leão on the keyboards and Fernando Júdice on the acoustic bass replacing Francisco Ribeiro.

Professional ratings
Review scores
Source	Rating
AllMusic	3/5 stars

== Recording ==
O Paraíso was recorded and mixed between 28 June and 26 August 1997 at the Condulmer Studios in Venice, Italy. The mastering was done by Tim Young at the Metropolis Studios in London.

== Track listing ==
No.	Title	Lyrics	Music	Length
1.	"Haja o que Houver"	Pedro Ayres Magalhães	Magalhães	4:30
2.	"Os Dias são à Noite"	Magalhães	Magalhães	4:31
3.	"A Tempestade"	Carlos Maria Trindade	Trindade	5:14
4.	"A Andorinha da Primavera"	Magalhães	Trindade	4:03
5.	"Claridade"	Magalhães	José Peixoto	5:25
6.	"A Praia do Mar"	Magalhães	Peixoto	3:25
7.	"O Fim da Estrada"	Magalhães	Peixoto	3:53
8.	"Agora (Canção aos Novos)"	Magalhães	Magalhães	9:23
9.	"À Margem"	Magalhães	Magalhães	4:43
10.	"Carta para Ti"	Peixoto	Peixoto	4:49
11.	"Coisas Pequenas"	Magalhães	Magalhães	5:25
12.	"Não Muito Distante"	Magalhães	Magalhães	4:10
13.	"O Sonho"	Magalhães	Magalhães	5:07
14.	"O Paraíso"	Magalhães	Magalhães	6:49
Total length:				71:27

== Personnel ==
Credits are adapted from the album's inner notes.

Madredeus

- Teresa Salgueiro – voice
- Pedro Ayres Magalhães – acoustic guitar
- José Peixoto – acoustic guitar
- Carlos Maria Trindade – synthesizers
- Fernando Júdice – acoustic bass

Production

- Pedro Ayres Magalhães – production, mixing, cover project
- Matt Butler – sound engineer
- Maximiliano Bacchin – assistant technician
- Jorge Barata – group's sound engineer
- Tim Young – mastering
- Daniel Blaufuks – artistic direction, photography
- Augusto Brázio – photomontage
- António Cunha – management

== Charts ==
Weekly charts
Chart	Peak position
Belgian Albums (Ultratop Flanders)	20
Belgian Albums (Ultratop Wallonia)	37
French Albums (SNEP)	65
Portuguese Albums (AFP)	2
