= Electrónico =

Compilation album by Madredeus
- Released: July 30, 2002
- Recorded: 2000–2002
- Genres: Portuguese music, folk, electronica
- Length: 60:15
- Label: EMI-Valentim de Carvalho
- Producer: Pedro Ayres Magalhães

Madredeus chronology
Euforia (2002)	Electrónico (2002)	Um Amor Infinito (2004)

Electrónico is a 2002 compilation album by the folk-influenced Portuguese band Madredeus. The tracks come from the following albums: O Espirito Da Paz, Ainda, O Paradiso, Antologia and Movimento. It achieved Gold certification, for sales exceeding 20,000 copies in Portugal.

== Track listing ==
=== Portuguese original ===
1. "Haja O Que Houver" (Pedro Ayres Magalhães) - 5:07
2. "Vem (Alem De Toda A Solidao)" (Magalhães) - 3:11
3. "Ecos Na Catedral" (Carlos Maria Trindade) - 4:12
4. "O Paraiso" (Magalhães) - 5:30
5. "O Mar" (Magalhães) - 7:34
6. "O Sonho" (Magalhães) - 5:32
7. "A Lira-Solidao No Oceano" (Magalhães) - 5:33
8. "A Andorinha Da Primavera" (Magalhães/Trindade) - 5:37
9. "Oxala" (Magalhães) - 5:18
10. "Ao Longe O Mar" (Magalhães) - 8:14
11. "Ainda Insect" (Magalhães) - 6:50
12. "Anseio (Fuga Apressada)" (Magalhães) - 4:40
13. "Guitarra" (Magalhães/Rodrigo Leão) - 8:04

=== English translation ===
1. "Come what may"
2. "Come (Beyond All The Loneliness)"
3. "Echoes In The Cathedral"
4. "The Paradise"
5. "The Sea"
6. "The Dream"
7. "The Lyre - Loneliness In The Ocean"
8. "The Swallow of Spring"
9. "I Hope (May God Wish)"
10. "Faraway The Sea"
11. "Still"
12. "Anxiety (Rushing Fugue)"
13. "Guitar"

All songs translated to English by their respective authors.

== Personnel ==
- Teresa Salgueiro - vocals
- José Peixoto - classic guitar
- Pedro Ayres Magalhães - classic guitar
- Francisco Ribeiro - cello
- Gabriel Gomes - accordion
- Rodrigo Leão - keyboards
- Fernando Judic - acoustic bass guitar
- Carlos Maria Trindade - keyboards
