= Ainda =

Soundtrack album by Madredeus
- Released: March 7, 1995
- Recorded: October 1993, March – May 1994
- Genres: Folk, world music
- Length: 41:25
- Labels: EMI, Valentim de Carvalho
- Producer: Pedro Ayres Magalhães

Madredeus chronology
O Espírito da Paz (1994)	Ainda (1995)	O Paraíso (1997)

Ainda: Original Motion Picture Soundtrack From The Film «Lisbon Story» is a soundtrack album by Portuguese group Madredeus for the 1994 film Lisbon Story, directed by Wim Wenders. It was released on 7 March 1995 by EMI-Valentim de Carvalho.

Professional ratings
Review scores
Source	Rating
AllMusic	4.5/5 stars

== Recording ==
Ainda was recorded between 27 March and 5 May 1994 at the Great Linford Manor and Lansdowne Recording Studios, in England. Recording and mixing were done by António Pinheiro da Silva and Jonathan Miller. The mixing was done at the Tritonius Studios in Berlin, in October 1994.

The bonus track "Maio Maduro Maio" was recorded on 4 and 5 October 1993 at the Estúdio Angel 2.

== Legacy ==
This album is present in the Brazilian edition of the book 1001 Albums You Must Hear Before You Die.

== Track listing ==
No.	Title	Lyrics	Music	Length
1.	"Guitarra"	Popular	Pedro Ayres Magalhães, Rodrigo Leão	3:45
2.	"Milagre"	Magalhães	Leão	4:17
3.	"Céu da Mouraria"	Magalhães	Magalhães	3:42
4.	"Miradouro de Santa Catarina" (instrumental)		Leão	4:09
5.	"A Cidade e os Campos"	Francisco Ribeiro	Ribeiro	3:33
6.	"Tejo"	Magalhães	José Peixoto	4:11
7.	"Viagens Interditas" (instrumental)		Magalhães, Leão	2:51
8.	"Alfama"	Magalhães	Magalhães, Leão	3:27
9.	"Ainda"	António Jorge Pacheco, Magalhães	Magalhães	7:18
10.	"Maio Maduro Maio" (bonus track)	José Afonso	Afonso	4:12
Total length:				41:25

== Personnel ==
Credits are adapted from the album's inner notes.

Madredeus

- Teresa Salgueiro – vocals
- José Peixoto – guitar
- Pedro Ayres Magalhães – guitar
- Francisco Ribeiro – cello
- Gabriel Gomes – accordion
- Rodrigo Leão – keyboard

Production

- Pedro Ayres Magalhães – production, artistic direction, arrangements, cover concept
- António Pinheiro da Silva – recording
- Jonathan Miller – recording, remixing (track 10)
- Andy Griffin – assistant in Linford Manor
- Mark Tucker – assistant in Lansdowne
- Thomas Juhl – assistant engineers
- Marko Berknir – assistant engineers
- Ingo Steinbech – digital mastering
- António Cunha – executive production

== Charts ==
Weekly charts
Chart	Peak position
Belgian Albums (Ultratop Flanders)	14
Belgian Albums (Ultratop Wallonia)	31
Portuguese Albums (AFP)	1
