= A Um Deus Desconhecido =

Studio album by Sétima Legião
- Released: July 1984
- Recorded: 1983–1984
- Genres: Post-punk, folk rock, rock
- Length: 54:08
- Label: EMI
- Producers: Sétima Legião, Pedro Ayres Magalhães, and Ricardo Camacho

Sétima Legião chronology
A Um Deus Desconhecido (1984)	Mar D'Outubro (1987)

A Um Deus Desconhecido (Portuguese words for "To an unknown God") is Sétima Legião debut album released in July 1984. Although it wasn't the most commercially successful album by the band, it is still regarded as one of the most important albums in the development of Portuguese rock.

== Track listing ==
1. Glória - 4:20
2. A Partida - 5:11
3. Com O Vento - 4:45
4. Manto Branco - 5:00
5. O Canto E O Gelo - 3:35
6. Mar D'Outubro - 3:09
7. Ritual - 3:55
8. Vertigem - 4:36
9. Aguarela - 3:59
10. A Partida (Versão) - 4:50
11. Porta Do Sol - 4:03
12. Pois Que Deus Assim O Quis - 4:30
13. Anos Depois - 1:18

All Songs written by Francisco Menezes except Glória written by Miguel Esteves Cardoso

== Credits ==
- Pedro Oliveira - lead vocals, guitar
- Rodrigo Leão - bass guitar, keyboards
- Nuno Cruz - drums
- Paulo Marinho - bagpipes
- Francisco Menezes - backing vocals
