= Movimento =

Studio album by Madredeus
- Released: April 9, 2001
- Recorded: January–February 2000
- Studio: Wisseloord Studios, Hilversum
- Genre: Folk, world music
- Length: 77:22
- Label: EMI, Valentim de Carvalho
- Producer: Pedro Ayres Magalhães

Madredeus chronology
O Porto (1998)	Movimento (2001)	Euforia (2002)

Movimento (English: "Movement") is the sixth studio album by Portuguese group Madredeus. It was released on 9 April 2001 by EMI-Valentim de Carvalho.

Professional ratings
Review scores
Source	Rating
AllMusic	4/5 stars

== Recording ==
Movimento was recorded in January and February 2000 at the Wisseloord Studios in Hilversum, Netherlands. The mixing was done at the Êxito Estúdio in Lisbon, Portugal, in April 2000.

== Track listing ==
No.	Title	Lyrics	Music	Length
1.	"Anseio (Fuga Apressada)"	Pedro Ayres Magalhães	Magalhães	3:39
2.	"Ecos na Catedral"	Carlos Maria Trindade	Trindade	6:24
3.	"Afinal – A Minha Canção"	Magalhães	Magalhães	6:06
4.	"O Labirinto Parado"	Trindade	Trindade	4:13
5.	"O Olhar"	Magalhães	José Peixoto	4:39
6.	"A Lira – Solidão No Oceano"	Magalhães	Magalhães	4:46
7.	"O Segredo do Futuro"	Magalhães	Fernando Júdice	5:05
8.	"A Quimera"	Magalhães	Magalhães	5:04
9.	"Graça – A Última Ciência"	Magalhães	Magalhães	3:20
10.	"A Vida Boa"	Magalhães	Peixoto	4:04
11.	"Um Raio de Luz Ardente"	Magalhães	Magalhães	6:06
12.	"A Capa Negra (Mano a Mano)"	Magalhães	Magalhães	3:36
13.	"Palpitação"	Magalhães	Magalhães	5:23
14.	"Ergue-te ao Sol"	Magalhães	Peixoto	5:38
15.	"Vozes no Mar"	Magalhães	Magalhães	5:25
16.	"Tarde, por favor"	Magalhães	Magalhães	3:46
Total length:				77:22

== Personnel ==
Credits are adapted from the album's inner notes.

Madredeus

- Teresa Salgueiro – voice
- Pedro Ayres Magalhães – classic guitar
- José Peixoto – classic guitar
- Carlos Maria Trindade – synthesizers
- Fernando Júdice – acoustic bass

Production

- Pedro Ayres Magalhães – production, musical direction, cover project
- Jorge Barata – sound engineer
- António Pinheiro da Silva – sound engineer
- Hessel Hélder – assistant at Wisseloord Studios
- Paulo Trindade – assistant at Êxito Estúdio
- Luís Delgado – assistant at Estúdio Tcha Tcha Tcha (pre-production)
- Paulo Jorge Ferreira – mastering
- Paulo Junqueiro – executive production
- Helena Evangelista – executive production
- Daniel Blaufuks – photography
- António Cunha – management
- Paulo Nery – management
- Maria Forjaz – management

== Charts ==
Weekly charts
Chart	Peak position
Belgian Albums (Ultratop Flanders)	42
Belgian Albums (Ultratop Wallonia)	11
French Albums (SNEP)	71
Italian Albums (FIMI)	47
Portuguese Albums (AFP)	2
