= Faluas do Tejo =

Studio album by Madredeus
- Released: February 14, 2005
- Recorded: February 2004
- Studio: Xangrilá Studios, Lisbon
- Genre: Folk, world music
- Length: 43:33
- Label: EMI, Valentim de Carvalho
- Producer: Pedro Ayres Magalhães

Madredeus chronology
Um Amor Infinito (2004)	Faluas do Tejo (2005)	Metafonia (2008)

Faluas do Tejo (English: "Faluas of the Tagus") is the eighth studio album by Portuguese group Madredeus. It was released on 14 February 2005 by EMI-Valentim de Carvalho.

It is the last Madredeus album with vocalist Teresa Salgueiro and musicians José Peixoto and Fernando Júdice.

Professional ratings
Review scores
Source	Rating
All About Jazz	4.5/5 stars

== Recording ==
Faluas do Tejo was recorded in February 2004 at the Xangrilá Studios in Lisbon, Portugal, in the same recording sessions as the group's previous album, Um Amor Infinito. The mixing was done at the Garate Studios in San Sebastián, Spain, in March 2004.

== Track listing ==
No.	Title	Lyrics	Music	Length
1.	"Lisboa, Rainha do Mar"	Pedro Ayres Magalhães	Magalhães	5:07
2.	"Fado das Dúvidas"	Magalhães	Magalhães	4:01
3.	"Adoro Lisboa"	Magalhães	Fernando Júdice	4:57
4.	"Névoas da Madrugada"	José Peixoto	Peixoto	3:48
5.	"Faluas do Tejo"	Magalhães	Magalhães	4:58
6.	"No Meu Jardim-Sementes à Terra"	Carlos Maria Trindade	Trindade	3:17
7.	"O Cais Distante"	Rui Machado	Peixoto	4:29
8.	"Na Estrada de Santiago"	Magalhães	Magalhães	4:32
9.	"Lá de Fora"	Trindade	Trindade	4:28
10.	"O Canto da Saudade (PAM)"	Magalhães	Magalhães	3:56
Total length:				43:33

== Personnel ==
Credits are adapted from the album's inner notes.

Madredeus

- Teresa Salgueiro – voice
- Pedro Ayres Magalhães – classic guitar
- José Peixoto – classic guitar
- Carlos Maria Trindade – synthesizers
- Fernando Júdice – acoustic bass

Production

- Pedro Ayres Magalhães – production, musical direction, cover concept
- Jorge Barata – sound engineer
- Pedro Rego – assistant technician at Xangrilá Studios
- Hartiz Harreguy – assistant technician at Garate Studios
- Tim Young – mastering
- Daniel Blaufuks – photography
- Paulo Junqueiro – executive production
- Maria João Fortes – executive production
- Helena Evangelista – executive production

== Charts ==
Weekly charts
Chart	Peak position
Belgian Albums (Ultratop Flanders)	47
Dutch Albums (Album Top 100)	71
Portuguese Albums (AFP)	2
Spanish Albums (PROMUSICAE)	63
