= Existir =

Studio album by Madredeus
- Released: 12 May 1990
- Recorded: February–April 1990
- Studios: Namouche Studios, Lisbon
- Genres: Folk, world music
- Length: 43:00
- Labels: EMI, Valentim de Carvalho
- Producers: Pedro Ayres Magalhães, António Pinheiro da Silva

Madredeus chronology
Os Dias da MadreDeus (1987)	Existir (1990)	Lisboa (1992)

Existir (English: "To exist") is the second studio album by Portuguese group Madredeus. It was released on 12 May 1990 through EMI-Valentim de Carvalho.

== Style ==
The music in Existir uses the same instrumentation as its predecessor, with classical guitar, keyboards, accordion, cello and vocals by Teresa Salgueiro. It combines Portuguese folk with the additional use of keyboards and synthesizers.

== Reception ==
Existir reached number one in the Portuguese album charts and was 4 weeks at the top position.

"O Pastor" (English: "The Shepherd") was a hit in Portugal. It was covered by vocalist/guitarist Rafael Bittencourt on his solo record Bittencourt Project – Brainworms I.

== Track listing ==
No.	Title	Lyrics	Music	Length
1.	"Matinal" (vocal)	Francisco Ribeiro	Ribeiro	3:24
2.	"O Pastor"	Pedro Ayres Magalhães	Madredeus	3:42
3.	"O Navio"	Magalhães	Magalhães	3:33
4.	"Tardes de Bolonha" (instrumental)		Rodrigo Leão	3:03
5.	"O Ladrão"	Magalhães, Teresa Salgueiro, Ribeiro	Madredeus	2:47
6.	"Confissão"	Magalhães	Magalhães	2:45
7.	"O Pomar das Laranjeiras"	Magalhães	Magalhães	4:18
8.	"Cuidado"	Magalhães	Madredeus	4:08
9.	"As Ilhas dos Açores" (instrumental)		Madredeus	5:01
10.	"O Menino"	Popular	Ribeiro	3:52
11.	"Solstício" (instrumental)		Madredeus	4:09
12.	"A Vontade de Mudar"	Leão, Ribeiro, Magalhães	Leão	2:18
Total length:				43:00

== Personnel ==
Credits are adapted from the album's inner notes.

Musicians

- Teresa Salgueiro
- Pedro Ayres Magalhães
- Rodrigo Leão
- Gabriel Gomes
- Francisco Ribeiro

Production

- Pedro Ayres Magalhães – producer, mixing
- António Pinheiro da Silva – producer, mixing, recording
- André Navarro – cover design
- António Homem Cardoso – photography

== Charts ==
Weekly charts
Chart	Peak position
Portuguese Albums (AFP)	1
