= Rita Damásio =

Portuguese singer (born 1978)

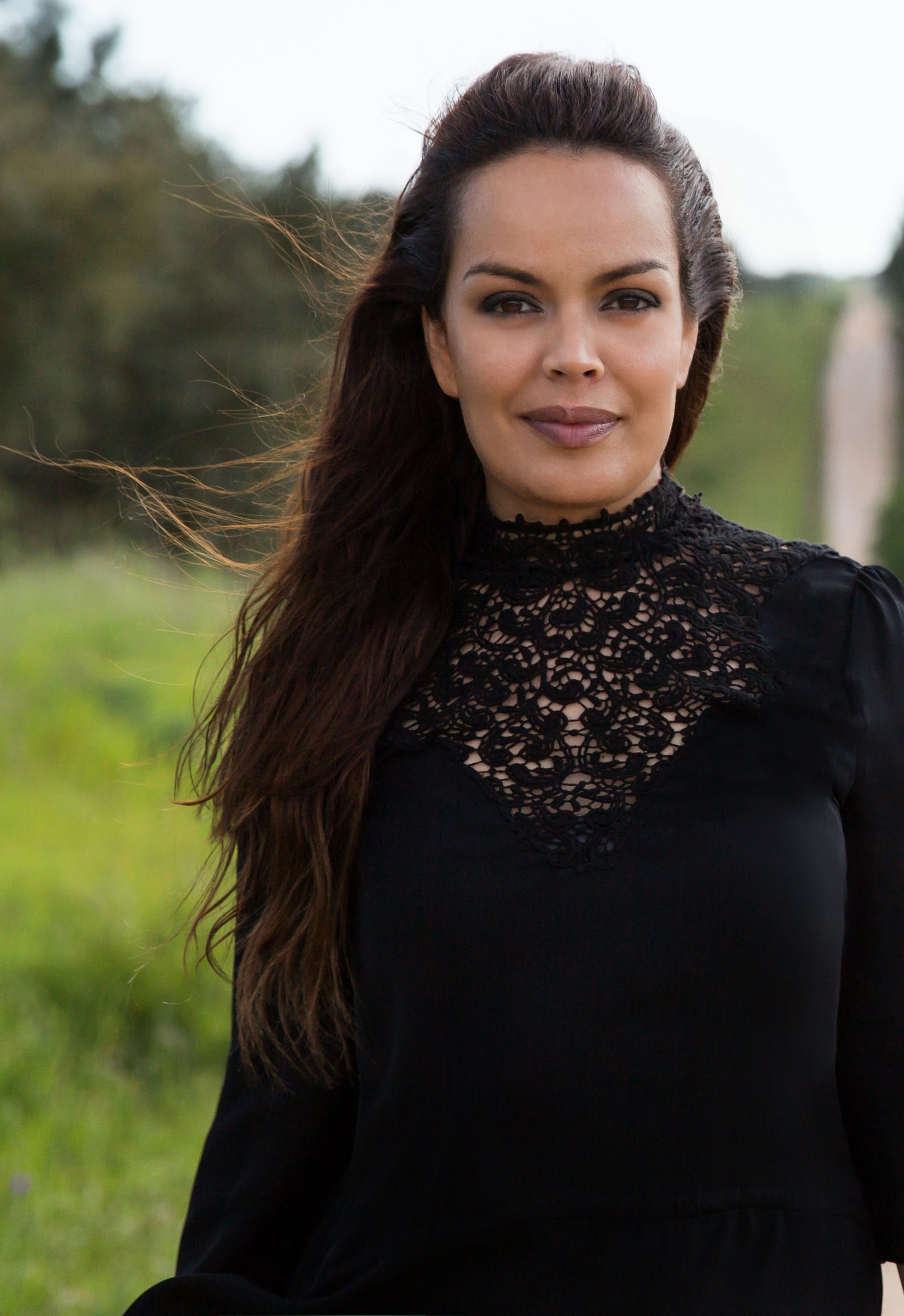
- Damásio in 2015

Background information
- Born: 12 August 1978 (age 48); Sainte-Adresse, Normandy, France
- Genre: World music
- Occupations: Singer, songwriter
- Instrument: Vocals
- Formerly of: Madredeus

Rita Damásio (born 1978) is a Portuguese singer, broadcaster and social worker. Her music mixes traditional Portuguese music, French music, alternative rock, world music and gospel. She sings in both Portuguese and French, and has been described as the "voice of multiculturalism".

== Early life ==
Damásio was born in Sainte-Adresse in the Normandy of France on 12 August 1978. She grew up in Rouen, where she began her musical training at the age of seven by joining the youth choir of the Chorale Maîtrise Saint-Évode de la Cathédrale Notre-Dame de Rouen, although she, together with her sister and brother, had already been exposed to strong musical influences at home from her family's Angolan roots. Her influences included Portuguese fado, as well as morna and semba, from Angola, together with French music and influences from artists of many nationalities who were exiled in France. Moving to Portugal, she continued studying classical singing in private classes and then at the jazz school of the Hot Club of Portugal.

Damásio has a degree in African Studies from the Faculty of Arts of the University of Lisbon and studied for a master's degree in Development Studies, with a specialization in Health, at ISCTE – University Institute of Lisbon. Damásio debuted with garage groups in Torres Novas and began her professional career in the band Cardilium, from Torres Novas, a band that played gothic rock. While studying, she began performing vocals for various Portuguese and African music groups, such as Tito Paris and Princezito (Cape Verde); Banda B.Leza, Paulo Flores, and Kalaf Angelo (Angola); Manecas Costa (Guinea-Bissau), and Costa Neto (Mozambique). She was also an editorial assistant for the digital African Contemporary Art platform BUALA.

== Career ==
As a backing vocalist, Damásio performed throughout Portugal. In 2008, with the departure of Teresa Salgueiro from Madredeus she joined the popular Portuguese group as part of the newly formed Banda Cósmica, as one of the two vocalists. This collaboration lasted for three years and resulted in three albums of new material: Metafonia (2008), A Nova Aurora (2009) and Castelos na Areia (2010). The music of Madredeus combined traditional Portuguese music, with fado and folk music. The arrangement ended because of financial reasons, caused in part by the decline in sales of compact discs due to the rise in online music sources. With Madredeus she performed in Portugal, in Germany, in Cape Verde, at the Théâtre de la Ville in Paris, and in the Teatro Calderón in Madrid. In 2009 Madredeus went to Brazil to take part in the Commemorative Week of Relations between Brazil and Portugal, in Brasília. In the same year, the group performed in Poland.

In 2013, Damásio started to write her own songs and to record for Portuguese and Angolan labels. In 2017, she wrote, recorded, and co-produced her first solo EP, together with Jean Massicotte and François Lalonde, who had produced Lhasa de Sela, a singer Damásio very much admired. The album's songs were in both Portuguese and French. She also works as a bilingual voice-over narrator for documentaries and films, as well as for advertising, with companies such as L'Oréal, and as an English-French translator. She has studied music in the community or participatory music at the University of Limerick in Ireland and the teaching of singing at the Institute for Vocal Advancement. In 2020 she took a course at Goldsmiths, University of London on using effective musical experiences for so-called "hard to reach" young people.

== Social work ==
Damásio is a co-founder of AP-IMIDIWAN based in Niamey, Niger, an NGO aimed at sponsoring Nomadic Tuareg children of the desert.

== Discography ==
=== Solo ===
- 2017 - Peregrina (Pilgrim)

=== With Madredeus ===
- 2011 - Castelos na Areia (Castles in the Sand)
- 2009 - A Nova Aurora (The New Dawn)
- 2008 - Metafonia
- 2008 - Metafonia - Live Studio-Concert at the Iberian Theatre (DVD)

=== Other collaborations ===
- 2020 - Alexandre Magnani - A Gente é Igual (People are equal))
- 2016 - Paulo Flores - Bolo De Aniversário (Birthday Cake)
- 2015 - Tito Paris - Acústico
- 2013 - Paulo Flores - O País que Nasceu Meu Pai – (The country where my father was born)
- 2012 - Boss AC featuring Shout - Tu És Mais Forte (Tou are stronger))
- 2009 - Paulo Flores - Ex Combatentes (Former Combatants)
