= Um Amor Infinito =

Studio album by Madredeus
- Released: May 17, 2004
- Recorded: February 2004
- Studio: Xangrilá Studios, Lisbon
- Genre: Folk, world music
- Length: 69:21
- Label: EMI, Valentim de Carvalho
- Producer: Pedro Ayres Magalhães

Madredeus chronology
Euforia (2002)	Um Amor Infinito (2004)	Faluas do Tejo (2005)

Um Amor Infinito (English: "An Infinite Love") is the seventh studio album by Portuguese group Madredeus. It was released on 17 May 2004 by EMI-Valentim de Carvalho.

== Recording ==
Um Amor Infinito was recorded in February 2004 at the Xangrilá Studios in Lisbon, Portugal. The mixing was done at the Garate Studios in San Sebastian, Spain, in March 2004.

== Track listing ==
No.	Title	Lyrics	Music	Length
1.	"Ó Luz da Alegria"	Pedro Ayres Magalhães	Magalhães	4:30
2.	"Cantador da Noite"	Magalhães	José Peixoto	4:17
3.	"Uma Estátua"	Carlos Maria Trindade	Trindade	7:38
4.	"Um Amor Infinito"	Magalhães	Magalhães	5:08
5.	"Palavras Ausente"	Magalhães	Magalhães	4:44
6.	"Vislumbrar – O Canto Encantado"	Magalhães	Magalhães	4:51
7.	"Moro em Lisboa"	Magalhães	Magalhães	4:09
8.	"Os Males do Mundo"	Magalhães	Fernando Júdice	5:47
9.	"Ao Crepúsculo"	Magalhães	Magalhães	6:39
10.	"O Olival – A passo, a trote e a galope"		Magalhães	5:10
11.	"Reflexos de Ouro"	Magalhães	Magalhães	5:01
12.	"Suave Tristeza"	Trindade	Trindade	5:37
13.	"Às Vezes"	Magalhães	Magalhães	5:50
Total length:				69:21

== Personnel ==
Credits are adapted from the album's inner notes.

Madredeus

- Teresa Salgueiro – voice
- Pedro Ayres Magalhães – classic guitar
- José Peixoto – classic guitar
- Carlos Maria Trindade – synthesizers
- Fernando Júdice – acoustic bass

Production

- Pedro Ayres Magalhães – production, musical direction, cover concept
- Jorge Barata – sound engineer
- Pedro Rego – assistant technician at Xangrilá Studios
- Hartiz Harreguy – assistant technician at Garate Studios
- Tim Young – mastering
- Daniel Blaufuks – photography
- Paulo Junqueiro – executive production
- Maria João Fortes – executive production
- Helena Evangelista – executive production

== Charts ==
Weekly charts
Chart	Peak position
Belgian Albums (Ultratop Flanders)	51
Belgian Albums (Ultratop Wallonia)	33
Italian Albums (FIMI)	69
Portuguese Albums (AFP)	1
