= O Espírito da Paz =

Studio album by Madredeus
- Released: June 23, 1994
- Recorded: March – May 1994
- Genres: Folk, world music
- Length: 56:34
- Labels: EMI, Valentim de Carvalho
- Producer: Pedro Ayres Magalhães

Madredeus chronology
Lisboa (1992)	O Espírito da Paz (1994)	Ainda (1995)

O Espírito da Paz (English: "The Spirit of Peace") is the third studio album by Portuguese group Madredeus. It was released on 23 June 1994 by EMI-Valentim de Carvalho.

Professional ratings
Review scores
Source	Rating
AllMusic	4/5 stars

== Recording ==
O Espírito da Paz was recorded and mixed between 27 March and 5 May 1994 at the Great Linford Manor and Lansdowne Recording Studios, in England. Recording and mixing were done by António Pinheiro da Silva and Jonathan Miller. The mastering was done at the CTS Studios in London, on 4 May 1994.

== Track listing ==
No.	Title	Lyrics	Music	Length
1.	"Concertino: Minuete"		Pedro Ayres Magalhães	1:44
2.	"Concertino: Allegro"		Magalhães	2:33
3.	"Concertino: Destino"	Magalhães	Magalhães	5:24
4.	"Concertino: Silêncio"	Magalhães	Magalhães	2:04
5.	"Os Senhores da Guerra"	Francisco Ribeiro, Magalhães	Ribeiro	4:42
6.	"Pregão"	Ribeiro	Ribeiro	4:11
7.	"O Mar"	Magalhães	Magalhães	5:39
8.	"Os Moinhos"		Magalhães, Rodrigo Leão	4:27
9.	"Três Ilusões: Sentimento"	Magalhães	Magalhães	3:38
10.	"Três Ilusões: Culpa"	Magalhães	Magalhães	3:13
11.	"Três Ilusões: Amargura"	Magalhães	Magalhães	3:07
12.	"As Cores do Sol"	Magalhães	Magalhães, Gabriel Gomes	3:44
13.	"Ao Longe O Mar"	Magalhães	Magalhães	3:47
14.	"Vem (Além de Toda a Solidão)"	Magalhães	Magalhães, Leão, Gomes	3:11
15.	"Ajuda"	Magalhães	Magalhães	5:10
Total length:				56:34

== Personnel ==
Credits are adapted from the album's inner notes.

Madredeus

- Teresa Salgueiro – voice
- José Peixoto – guitar
- Pedro Ayres Magalhães – guitar
- Francisco Ribeiro – cello
- Gabriel Gomes – accordion
- Rodrigo Leão – keyboards

Production

- Pedro Ayres Magalhães – production
- António Pinheiro da Silva – recording, mixing
- Jonathan Miller – recording, mixing
- Andy Griffin – assistant at Linford Manor
- Mark Tucker – assistant at Lansdowne
- Mike Brown – digital editing
- Inês Gonçalves – photography
- Alberto Lopes – graphics and layout
- António Cunha – executive producer

== Charts ==
Weekly charts
Chart	Peak position
Portuguese Albums (AFP)	1
Spanish Albums (PROMUSICAE)	8
US World Albums (Billboard)	10
