= Os Dias da MadreDeus =

Studio album by Madredeus
- Released: December 1987
- Recorded: July 1987
- Genres: Folk, world music
- Length: 76:30
- Labels: EMI, Valentim de Carvalho
- Producer: Pedro Ayres Magalhães

Madredeus chronology
Os Dias da MadreDeus (1987)	Existir (1990)

Os Dias da MadreDeus (English: "The days of MadreDeus") is the debut studio album by Portuguese group Madredeus. It was released in December 1987 by EMI-Valentim de Carvalho.

Professional ratings
Review scores
Source	Rating
AllMusic	4/5 stars

== Recording ==
Os Dias da MadreDeus was recorded between 28 and 30 July 1987, at the Teatro Ibérico facilities in the old Church of the Xabregas Convent, in Lisbon.

== Legacy ==
In 2009, Portuguese music magazine Blitz placed Os Dias da MadreDeus as the 5th greatest Portuguese album of the 1980s, in a list ranking the greatest Portuguese albums of the previous four decades.

== Track listing ==
LP release (1987)

No.	Title	Lyrics	Music	Length
1.	"As Montanhas" (instrumental)		Gabriel Gomes	2:25
2.	"A Sombra"	Pedro Ayres Magalhães	Magalhães	5:31
3.	"A Vaca de Fogo"	Magalhães	Gomes, Magalhães	5:02
4.	"Os Pássaros Quando Morrem Caem No Céu" (instrumental)		Rodrigo Leão, Gomes, Francisco Ribeiro, Magalhães	2:25
5.	"A Estrada do Monte"	Magalhães	Leão, Magalhães	3:50
6.	"Adeus... E Nem Voltei"	Magalhães	Magalhães	5:50
7.	"A Península" (instrumental)		Leão, Magalhães, Gomes	4:06
8.	"A Cantiga do Campo"	Gomes Leal	Leão, Magalhães	6:28
9.	"Fado do Mindelo"	António Jorge Pacheco, Magalhães	Magalhães, Leão	5:07
10.	"A Marcha da Oriental" (instrumental)			5:59
11.	"A Cidade"	Francisco Menezes, Magalhães	Magalhães, Leão	6:00
12.	"Maldito Dia Aziago"	Magalhães	Magalhães, Leão	5:10
13.	"A Andorinha" (instrumental)		Magalhães	4:45
14.	"O Brasil"	Magalhães	Leão	5:37
15.	"O Meu Amor Vai Embora"	Magalhães	Leão, Magalhães	3:21
16.	"Amanhã"	Magalhães	Magalhães, Leão, Gomes	4:54
Total length:				76:30

== Personnel ==
Credits are adapted from the album's inner notes.

Madredeus

- Teresa Salgueiro
- Pedro Ayres Magalhães
- Rodrigo Leão
- Gabriel Gomes
- Francisco Ribeiro

Production

- Pedro Ayres Magalhães – project concept, artistic production, arrangements, cover concept
- Rodrigo Leão – project concept
- Pedro Bidarra de Almeida – recording production assistance
- Pedro Vasconcelos – recording technician
- Miguel Gonçalves – recording technician
- Alexandre Gonefrey – cover art
- Luís Ramos – photography
- Álvaro Rosemão – photography

== Charts ==
Weekly charts
Chart	Peak position
Portuguese Albums (AFP)	40
