= Heróis do Mar (band) =

Portuguese pop rock band

- Origin: Portugal
- Genres: New wave, pop rock, post-punk, synthpop
- Years active: 1981–1990
- Members: Tozé Almeida; Rui Pregal da Cunha; Paulo Pedro Gonçalves; Pedro Ayres Magalhães; Carlos Maria Trindade

Heróis do Mar was a Portuguese pop rock band formed in March 1981. The group was disbanded in the spring of 1990. Their name Heróis do Mar is taken from the first line of the Portuguese national anthem.

== Members ==
- Paulo Pedro Gonçalves – guitar
- Carlos Maria Trindade – keyboards
- Tozé Almeida – drums
- Pedro Ayres Magalhães – bass guitar
- Rui Pregal da Cunha – vocals, mandolin

== Discography ==
=== Studio albums ===
- Heróis do Mar (LP, Polygram, 1981)
- Mãe (LP, Polygram, 1983)
- O Rapto (Mini-LP, Polygram, 1984)
- Macau (LP, EMI, 1986)
- Heróis do Mar IV (LP, EMI, 1988)

=== Video albums ===
- Vídeos 1981/1989 (DVD, EMI, 2011)

=== Singles ===
- Amor (Maxi, Polygram, 1982)
- Paixão (Maxi, Polygram, 1983)
- Alegria (Maxi, Polygram, 1985)
- Fado (Single, EMI, 1986)
- O Inventor (Maxi, EMI, 1987)
- Eu Quero (Mistura Possessiva) (Maxi, EMI, 1988)
- Africana (Maxi, EMI, 1989)
