= Madredeus =

Portuguese musical group

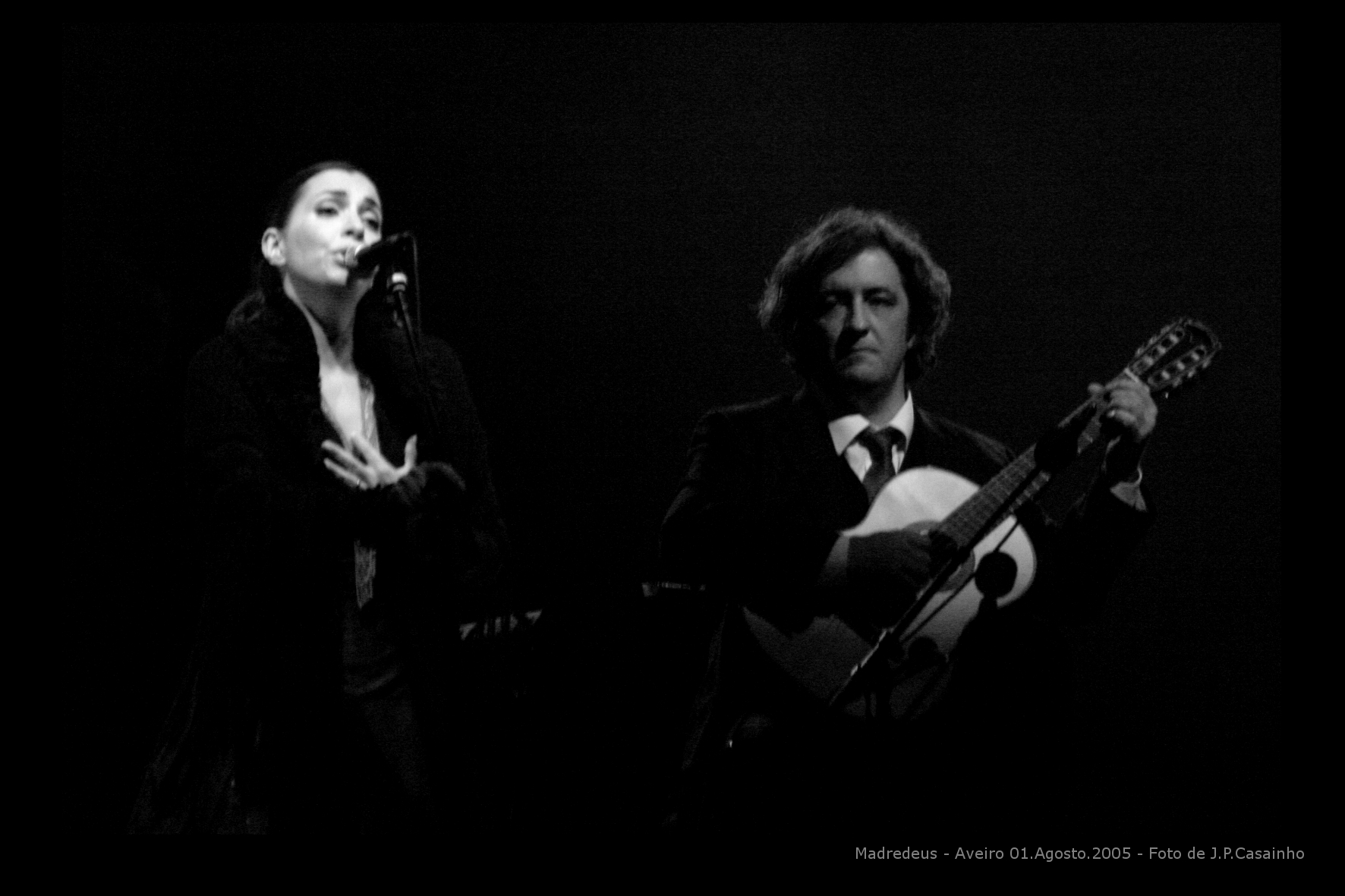
- Madredeus performing in Aveiro, in 2005

Background information
- Origin: Lisbon, Portugal
- Genres: Folk, new age, world music
- Years active: 1985–present
- Labels: EMI, Sony Music
- Members: Pedro Ayres Magalhães; Carlos Maria Trindade; Beatriz Nunes; Luís Clode; Ana Isabel Dias
- Past members: Teresa Salgueiro; Rodrigo Leão; Francisco Ribeiro; Gabriel Gomes; Fernando Júdice; José Peixoto; Jorge Varrecoso; António Figueiredo
- Website: madredeusofficial.com

Madredeus (Portuguese pronunciation: [maðɾɨˈðewʃ]) are a Portuguese musical ensemble formed in 1985, in Lisbon. Their music combines traditional Portuguese music, fado and folk music.

Madredeus are one of the most successful music groups from Portugal, having sold over 3 million albums worldwide.

== History ==
=== 1985–1993: Formation and first lineup ===
Madredeus' first lineup consisted of Pedro Ayres Magalhães (classical guitar), Rodrigo Leão (keyboard synthesizer), Francisco Ribeiro (cello), Gabriel Gomes (accordion) and Teresa Salgueiro (vocals). Magalhães and Leão formed the band in 1985, Ribeiro and Gomes joined in 1986. In search of a female singer, they found Teresa Salgueiro in one of Lisbon's night clubs. Teresa agreed to join and, in 1987, Madredeus recorded their first album, Os dias da MadreDeus.

The first album was recorded in their rehearsal space, a converted abbey in Lisbon. The recording was especially strenuous due to deafening interruptions every 5 minutes from Lisbon's tram service, which ran directly above. In honour of this unavoidable presence in their every performance, they named themselves after the surrounding neighborhood, Madre de Deus (Mother of God), shortened to the vernacular Madredeus.

The second album, Existir, was released in 1990. In 1992, they released their first live album, Lisboa, recorded at the Coliseu dos Recreios in Lisbon.

=== 1993–2007: Lineup changes and second main lineup ===
In 1993, Pedro Ayres Magalhães left the group temporarily and was replaced in live concerts by José Peixoto (classical guitar). Magalhães rejoined the group later, making it a sextet with two guitarists. In the following year, the group's third album O Espírito da Paz becomes their first album released as a sextet.

In 1994, the German director Wim Wenders, impressed by their music, asked Madredeus to perform in his movie Lisbon Story. The soundtrack for the film, Ainda, released in 1995, gave the group international fame. Madredeus consequently toured Europe, South America, Africa and Asia.

Rodrigo Leão left the group in 1994 to start a solo career, being replaced by Carlos Maria Trindade (keyboard synthesizer).

In 1997, Francisco Ribeiro and Gabriel Gomes left the group. Fernando Júdice (acoustic bass guitar) was invited to join the group and Madredeus became again a quintet. The album Paraíso, released that year, was the first with the new lineup, which would remain until 2007.

In 1998, Madredeus contributed "Os Dias São A Noite (Suso Saiz Remix)" to the AIDS benefit compilation album Onda Sonora: Red Hot + Lisbon produced by the Red Hot Organization. The group also performed in the opening ceremony of the Expo '98 in Lisbon, alongside José Carreras and Michael Nyman.

In November 2007, Teresa Salgueiro, Fernando Júdice and José Peixoto announce they would leave Madredeus.

=== 2008–2011: Madredeus & A Banda Cósmica ===
After the departures of Teresa Salgueiro, Fernando Júdice and José Peixoto, Pedro Ayres Magalhães and Carlos Maria Trindade decide to continue performing Madredeus' music with a new cast of supporting musicians, named A Banda Cósmica. The collaboration Madredeus & A Banda Cósmica released three albums of original material: Metafonia (2008), A Nova Aurora (2009) and Castelos na Areia (2010).

=== 2011–present: Current lineup ===
In 2011, Pedro Ayres Magalhães announced that Madredeus would be coming back with a new lineup and album. The new lineup is composed of Beatriz Nunes (vocals), Pedro Ayres de Magalhães (guitar), Carlos Maria Trindade (synthesizer), Jorge Varrecoso (violin), Antonio Figueirido (violin) and Luis Clode (cello).

The album Essência was released in 2012. The group's latest album, Capricho Sentimental, was released in 2015.

== Musical style ==
The music of Madredeus combines influences from traditional Portuguese music, fado and folk music. It has been described as post-fado and New Age fado.

A 1997 article in The New York Times stated that "Madredeus does to fado what Enya does to Irish traditional music: wrapping folk-rooted melodies in gauzy, portentous new age trappings", and that "in many ways, Madredeus is closer to an international movement of ethereal pop, akin to the Cocteau Twins and Kate Bush, than it is to fado."

Although Madredeus' visual presentation is similar to that of traditional fado settings, the group does not consider itself a fado group. According to Pedro Ayres Magalhães, “if you ask any fado player, they will very clearly tell you that Madredeus does not do fado. For example, we do not even include the traditional instrument - the 12-string Portuguese guitar”. Nevertheless, the influence of fado is very much present in their songs' lyrics, which are often melancholic and evoke the concept of saudade.

== Members ==
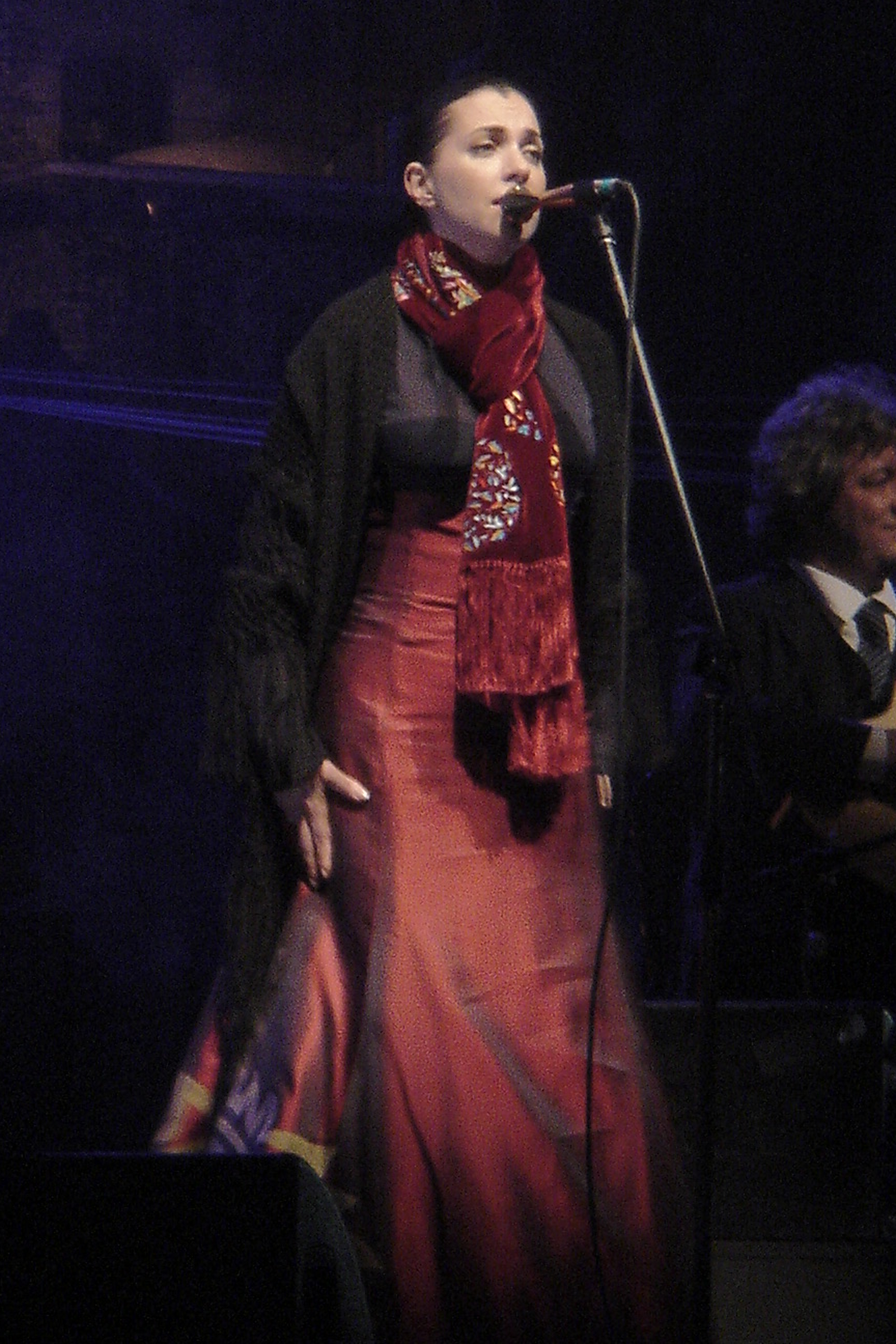
Teresa Salgueiro, vocalist between 1987 and 2007

Current members

- Beatriz Nunes – vocals (2012–present)
- Pedro Ayres Magalhães – classical guitar (1985–present)
- Carlos Maria Trindade – keyboards (1995–present)
- Luís Clode – cello (2012–present)
- Ana Isabel Dias – harp (2015–present)

Former members

- Rodrigo Leão – keyboards (1985–1994)
- Francisco Ribeiro – cello (1986–1997)
- Gabriel Gomes – accordion (1986–1997)
- Teresa Salgueiro – vocals (1987–2007)
- José Peixoto – classical guitar (1994–2007)
- Fernando Júdice – acoustic bass (1997–2007)
- Jorge Varrecoso – violin (2012–2015)
- António Figueiredo – violin (2012–2015)
- Rita Damásio – vocals (2008–2011)
- Mariana Abrunheiro - Vocals (2008-2011)

== Discography ==
=== Studio albums ===
- Os Dias da MadreDeus (1987)
- Existir (1990)
- O Espírito da Paz (1994)
- Ainda: Original Motion Picture Soundtrack From The Film "Lisbon Story" (1995)
- O Paraíso (1997)
- Movimento (2001)
- Um Amor Infinito (2004)
- Faluas do Tejo (2005)
- Essência (2012)
- Capricho Sentimental (2015)

As "Madredeus & A Banda Cósmica"

- Metafonia (2008)
- Metafonia - Concerto Estúdio ao vivo no Teatro Ibérico (2008)
- A Nova Aurora (2009)
- Castelos na Areia (2010)

=== Live albums ===
- Lisboa (1992, live in Lisbon)
- O Porto (1998, live in Porto)
- Euforia (2002, with the Flemish Radio Orchestra)

=== Remix albums ===
- Electrónico (2002)

=== Compilation albums ===
- Antologia (2000)
- Palavras Cantadas (2001)
