= Lisbon Story (1994 film) =

- Directed by: Wim Wenders
- Written by: Wim Wenders
- Produced by: Paulo Branco; Ulrich Felsberg; João Canijo; Wim Wenders
- Starring: Rüdiger Vogler; Patrick Bauchau
- Cinematography: Lisa Rinzler
- Edited by: Peter Przygodda; Anne Schnee
- Music by: Jürgen Knieper; Madredeus
- Distributed by: Atalanta Filmes (Portugal)
- Release date: 1994
- Running time: 100 minutes
- Countries: Germany; Portugal; France; Spain
- Languages: German; Portuguese; English

Lisbon Story (Portuguese: O Céu de Lisboa; German: Lisbon Story) is a 1994 feature film directed by Wim Wenders. It was screened in the Un Certain Regard section at the 1995 Cannes Film Festival. As part of Lisbon's programme as the European City of Culture in 1994, Wenders and three Portuguese filmmakers were invited to make a documentary about the city. The result was the fictional Lisbon Story.

== Plot ==
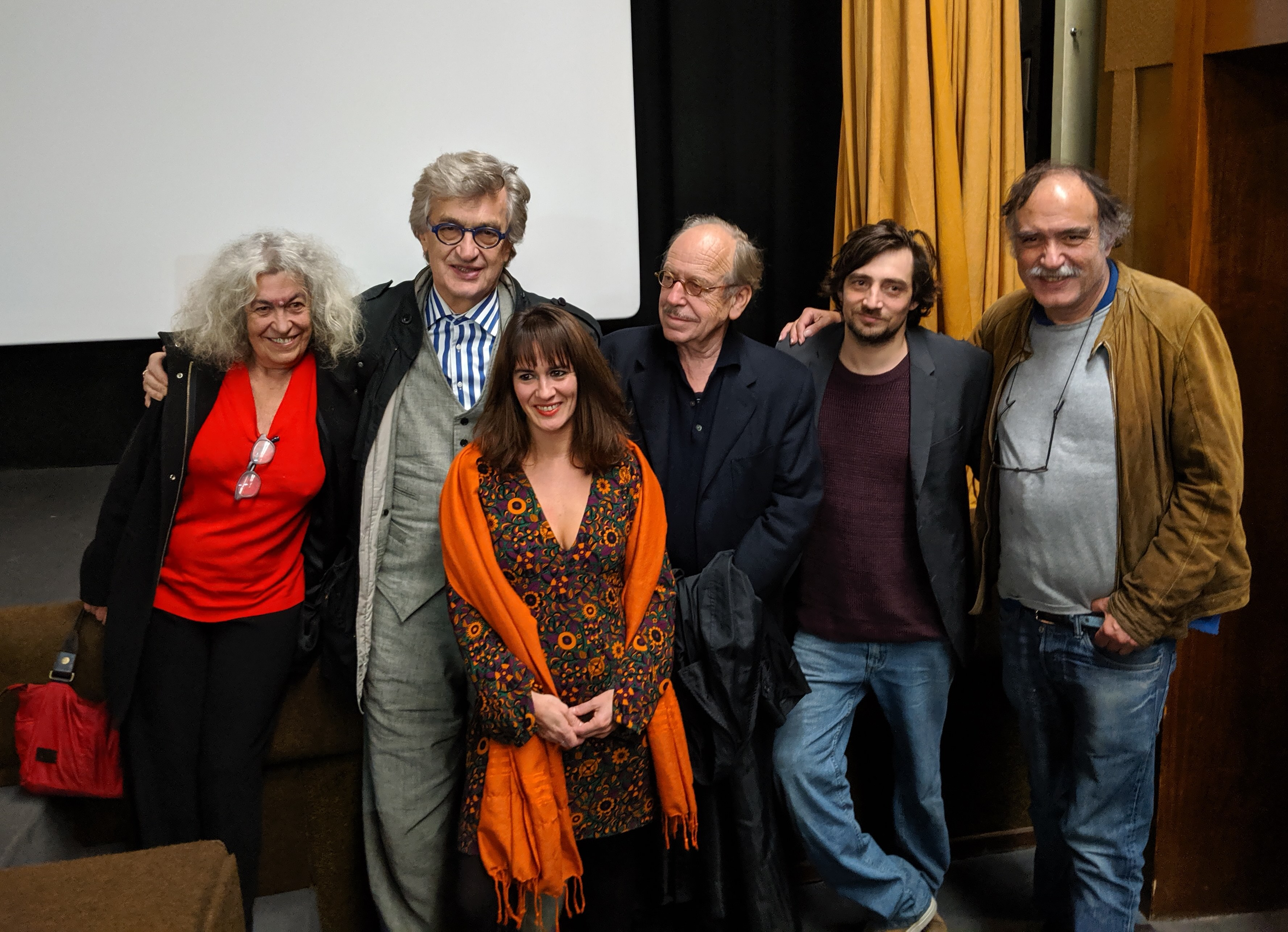
Wim Wenders with the producer and actors after the 25th Anniversary screening of Lisbon Story at Lisbon Film Festival 2019

Lisbon Story is partially a sequel to Wenders' 1982 film, The State of Things. The fictitious film director in the previous film, Friedrich Munro, reappears, again played by Patrick Bauchau.

In Lisbon Story Friedrich has moved to Lisbon, Portugal (the country where The State of Things was set). The principal character, Philip Winter (Rüdiger Vogler), a sound engineer, receives a postcard invitation from Friedrich to come to Lisbon to record sounds of the capital city for his forthcoming film. On arriving, Winter finds Friedrich's house occupied with his film editing equipment and many reels of film, but the director is nowhere to be found. Some children who apparently work with him indicate he will return, but don't know when. This sets in motion Winter's quest to find the missing Friedrich.

The sound engineer doesn't meet up with the director until the end of the movie, when it materialises that, disturbed by the commercialization of images, he had set out to capture what he terms the "unseen image" of the city, one devoid of the subjective view (executed by strapping a rolling camera onto his back, or carried about unaimed in plastic bags with holes cut for the lens), and then shown to no one, lest the source of the photo "die" with their viewing. This is after giving up on his initial project shot using an early hand-cranked motion picture camera, what he calls "pretending that the whole history of cinema had never happened." After this meeting, Winter leaves his own message for Friedrich using sound, his medium, and convinces him to continue his original project using the old-fashioned camera and his sound, together.

A semi-non-fictional aspect of the plot is the appearance of the internationally famous Portuguese folk music group Madredeus and Manoel de Oliveira.

== Homage to The Road Movie Trilogy ==
During the mid-1970s, Wim Wenders made three films which have come to be referred to as The Road Movie Trilogy. Lisbon Story pays subtle homage to these films. The sound engineer in Lisbon Story, Philip Winter, has the same name and is played by the same actor (Rüdiger Vogler) as the lead character in Alice in the Cities (1974), though the character Phil Winter was a writer in the first film. The name Winter is repeated in Kings of the Road (1976), also starring Vogler, although his full name in Kings is Bruno Winter and he is a projection-equipment mechanic.

== Featured cast ==
Actor	Role
Rüdiger Vogler	Philip Winter
Patrick Bauchau	Friedrich Munro
Vasco Sequeira	Truck Driver
Canto e Castro	Barber
Viriato José da Silva	Shoemaker
João Canijo	Crook
Ricardo Colares	Ricardo
Joel Cunha Ferreira	Zé
Sofia Bénard da Costa	Sofia
Vera Cunha Rocha	Vera
Elisabete Cunha Rocha	Beta
Teresa Salgueiro	Herself (Madredeus)
Pedro Ayres Magalhães	Himself (Madredeus)
Rodrigo Leão	Himself (Madredeus)
Gabriel Gomes	Himself (Madredeus)
José Peixoto	Himself (Madredeus)
Francisco Ribeiro	Himself (Madredeus)
Manoel de Oliveira	Himself

== Reception ==
In Portugal, the film was the fourth most popular Portuguese film in 1995 with admissions of 16,000.
