= Augusto Brázio =

Portuguese photographer

- Born: 1964 (age 61–62); Brinches, Serpa
- Website: augustobrazio.com

Augusto Brázio (Brinches, Serpa, 1964), is a Portuguese photographer with a long consolidated career in photography since the 90's, has had more than 10 books published.

== Biography ==
Augusto Brázio studied in Escola Superior de Belas Artes, Lisboa (1985–1990). He won First Prize in Visão / BES Photojournalism in 2008, was a member of the Collective Kameraphoto, and one of the 13 photographers selected for "Entre Imagens", a TV program for the Portuguese television about Portuguese Photography. Collaborates on a regular basis with several publications in different countries and has exhibitions in Lisbon, Porto, Paris, Brussels, among others.

In the recent years, the artist has concentrated more on his artistic projects, reflecting on issues such as immigration, belonging and occupied territories. He's represented in the collections: Portuguese State Collection / Ministry of Culture, Novo Banco Photography Collection, EDP Foundation, Coimbra Visual Arts Center, PLMJ Foundation, Norlinda and José Lima Collection, Encontros de Imagem de Braga (Photography festival), Sines Arts Center, Municipality of Alcanena, and “The never-ending collection” (Spain).

Augusto Brázio is represented by Galeria das Salgadeiras.

== Selected exhibitions ==
=== Solo ===
- 2023. "Visível corpo". Galeria das Salgadeiras. Lisboa. Portugal.
- 2020. "Fechados". Palácio de Landal. Santarém. Portugal.
- 2020. "Fechados". Museu de la Cárcova. Universidade Nacional das Artes. Buenos Aires. Argentina.
- 2020. "Filhos do Sol". Convento de São José Centro Cultural. Festival "Política e Imagem". Lagoa. Portugal.
- 2019. "Sopé". Museu da Água. Imago Lisboa. Lisboa. Portugal.
- 2017. "Na penumbra". Galeria das Salgadeiras. Lisboa. Portugal.
- 2016. "Bang!, Flâneur – New urban narratives". Paris. France.
- 2016. "Paz". Paço dos Henriques. Alcáçovas. Portugal.

=== Collective ===
- 2022. "ATER". Projekteria Art Gallery. Galeria das Salgadeiras. Barcelona. Spain.
- 2021. "Vende-se". Galeria Branca. Novosibirsk. Russia.
- 2021. "Vende-se". Budapest Photo Festival 2021. Budapest. Hungary.
- 2020. "SPECTRUM". Centro de Artes Visuais. Coimbra. Portugal.
- 2019. "ATER". Galeria das Salgadeiras. Lisboa. Portugal.
- 2019. "Da fluidez do vestígio." JUST LX. Galeria das Salgadeiras. Lisboa. Portugal.
- 2018. "A preto e branco na coleção da Fundação PLMJ". Sociedade Nacional de Belas Artes. Lisboa. Portugal.
- 2016. "Utopia hoje". Museu Abílio. FOLIO. Óbidos. Portugal.
- 2016. "Bang!, Flâneur by Lisboa". Lisboa. Portugal.

== Art Collections ==
His work is represented in several public and private collections, such as:

- Portuguese State Collection / Ministry of Culture
- Novo Banco Photography Collection, Portugal
- EDP Foundation, Portugal
- Coimbra Visual Arts Center, Portugal
- PLMJ Foundation, Portugal
- Norlinda and José Lima Collection, Portugal
- Encontros de Imagem de Braga (Photography Festival), Portugal
- Sines Arts Center, Portugal
- Municipality of Alcanena, Portugal
- The never-ending collection, Spain

== Art Fairs ==
- 2021. "Repouso e movimento. Invenção". Galeria das Salgadeiras. JUST MAD. Madrid. Spain.
- 2020. "ATER". Galeria das Salgadeiras. JUST MAD. Madrid. Spain.
- 2019. "Da fluidez do vestígio". Galeria das Salgadeiras. JUST LX. Lisboa. Portugal.

== Publications ==
- 2022. "Presentes Ausentes". PIPA – Programa da Imagem e da Palavra da Azinhaga. Portugal.
- 2020. "Filhos do Sol — A Busca do Idílico." Câmara Municipal de Lagoa. Portugal.
- 2019. "Rasgo" — Projecto "Viagens na minha terra". Quarta Parede. Covilhã. Portugal.
- 2017. "Debaixo da pele" — Projecto "Viagens na minha terra". Câmara Municipal de Águeda. Portugal.
- 2016. "Sor" — Projecto "Viagens na minha terra". Câmara Municipal de Ponte de Sor. Portugal.
- 2015. "Sopé" — Projecto "Viagens na minha terra". Teatro Virgínia/Câmara Municipal Torres Novas. Portugal.
- 2015. "Portel". Câmara Municipal de Portel. Portugal.

== Collective publications ==
- 2022. "Untitled". Galeria das Salgadeiras. Lisboa. Portugal.
- 2022. "ATER". Galeria das Salgadeiras. Lisboa. Portugal.
- 2011. "Um Diário da República". Lisboa. Portugal. KPhoto.
- 2009. "A State of Affairs". Lisboa. Portugal. Kphoto.
