= Sétima Legião =

Portuguese band

- Origin: Lisbon, Portugal
- Genres: Rock, post-punk, synthpop, folk rock
- Years active: 1982–2000
- Label: EMI
- Members: Pedro Oliveira (vocals, guitar); Rodrigo Leão (bass, composer); Nuno Cruz (drums); Paulo Marinho (bagpipes); Ricardo Camacho (keyboards, production); Susana Lopes (cello); Paulo Abelho (percussion); Gabriel Gomes (accordion); Francisco Menezes (lyrics, backing vocals); Lúcio Vieira (bass from 1996 to 1999 touring only)

Sétima Legião was a Portuguese rock band, active from 1982 when it was formed by friends Pedro Oliveira, Rodrigo Leão and Nuno Cruz until 2000. They named the band Sétima Legião after the Roman Seventh Legion sent to Lusitânia in the first century A.D.

In 1994, they split the stage with the British band The Stranglers to complete the opening act assignment in a live concert in Coimbra (Portugal) recorded in video on May 12.

== Members ==
- Pedro Oliveira (vocals and guitar)
- Rodrigo Leão (bass and keys)
- Nuno Cruz (drums, percussion)
- Gabriel Gomes (accordion)
- Paulo Tato Marinho (bagpipes, flute)
- Ricardo Camacho (keys)
- Paulo Abelho (percussion, samplers)
- Francisco Ribeiro de Menezes (letters, backing vocals)

== Discography ==
=== Studio albums ===
- A Um Deus Desconhecido (1984)
- Mar D'Outubro (1987)
- De Um Tempo Ausente (1989)
- O Fogo (1992)
- Sexto Sentido (1999)

=== Live albums ===
- Auto de Fé (1994)

=== Singles and promos ===
- Glória/Partida (1983)
- Sete Mares (1987)

=== Compilations ===
- A História da Sétima Legião: Canções 1983-2000 (2000)
- A História da Sétima Legião II: Músicas 1983-2003 (2003)
- Sete Mares - Colecção Caravelas (2004)
  - Grandes Êxitos (2006)
