= Mar D'Outubro =

Mar D'Outubro (Portuguese words for "October sea"), released in 1987, is the second album by Portuguese rock band Sétima Legião. It's one of the most commercially successful albums by the band, including singles like Sete Mares (Seven Seas) and Noutro Lugar (Another Place).

== Track listing ==
Side one
No.	Title	Writer(s)	Length
1.	"Sete Mares"		4:40
2.	"Noites Brancas"	Francisco Menezes	2:08
3.	"Noutro Lugar"	Francisco Menezes	5:13
4.	"Este Amor que nos Separa"		1:09
5.	"Saudades"	Menezes, Rodrigo Leão, Marco Santos	4:42

Side two
No.	Title	Writer(s)	Length
1.	"Baile (das Setes Partidas)"		2:50
2.	"Álem Tejo"	Menezes, Santos, Pedro Oliveira, Rodrigo Leão	4:35
3.	"A Reconquista"	Menezes, Santos, Oliveira	4:35
4.	"Os Limites do Mar"		4:15
5.	"Onde Tem Estado o Outono"		3:15
Total length:			35:62

== Personnel ==
- Rodrigo Leão - Bass, Guitar, Vocals
- Nuno Cruz - Drums
- Gabriel Gomes - Accordion
- Paulo Gabriel - Bagpipes, Wind (Bombard), Flute
- Ricardo Camacho - Guitar, Keyboards
- Pedro Oliveira - Guitar, Lead Vocals
- Paulo Abelho - Percussion

Technical personnel

- Amândio Bastos - Sound Engineer
- José Manuel Santa-Bárbara - Back Cover Photography
- José Pedro Santa-Bárbara - Cover Photography
- Ricardo Camacho - Producer
- Paulo Neves - Technician Assistant
