= Teresa Salgueiro =

Portuguese singer

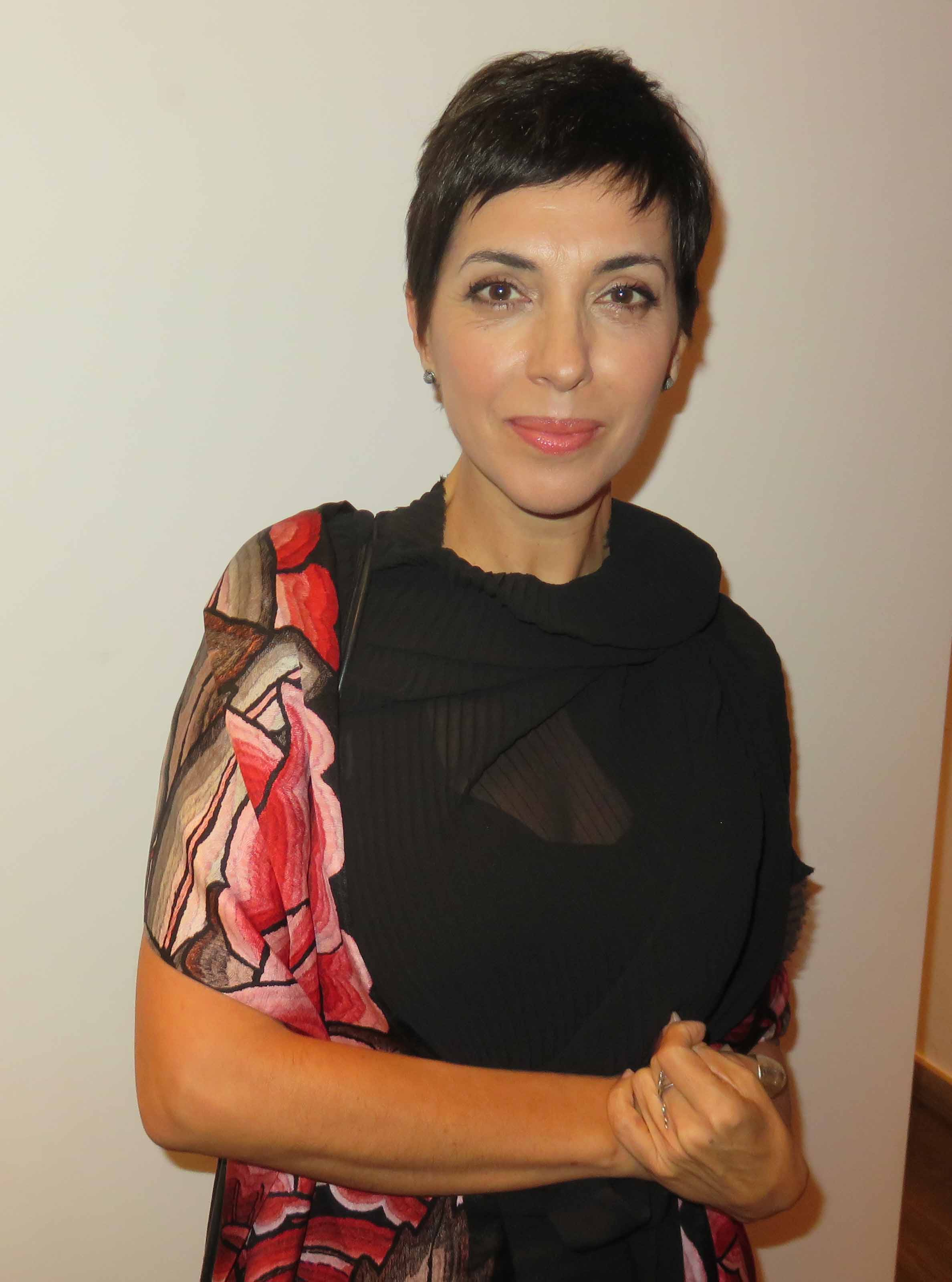
- Teresa Salgueiro in 2019

Background information
- Birth name: Maria Teresa de Almeida Salgueiro
- Occupation: Singer
- Years active: 1987–present
- Formerly of: Madredeus
- Website: teresasalgueiro.pt

Maria Teresa de Almeida Salgueiro OIH (Portuguese pronunciation: [tɨˈɾezɐ salˈɣɐjɾu]) is a Portuguese singer. She is best known as the lead singer of Madredeus from 1987 until 2007. She also appeared in Wim Wenders' film Lisbon Story.

== Career ==
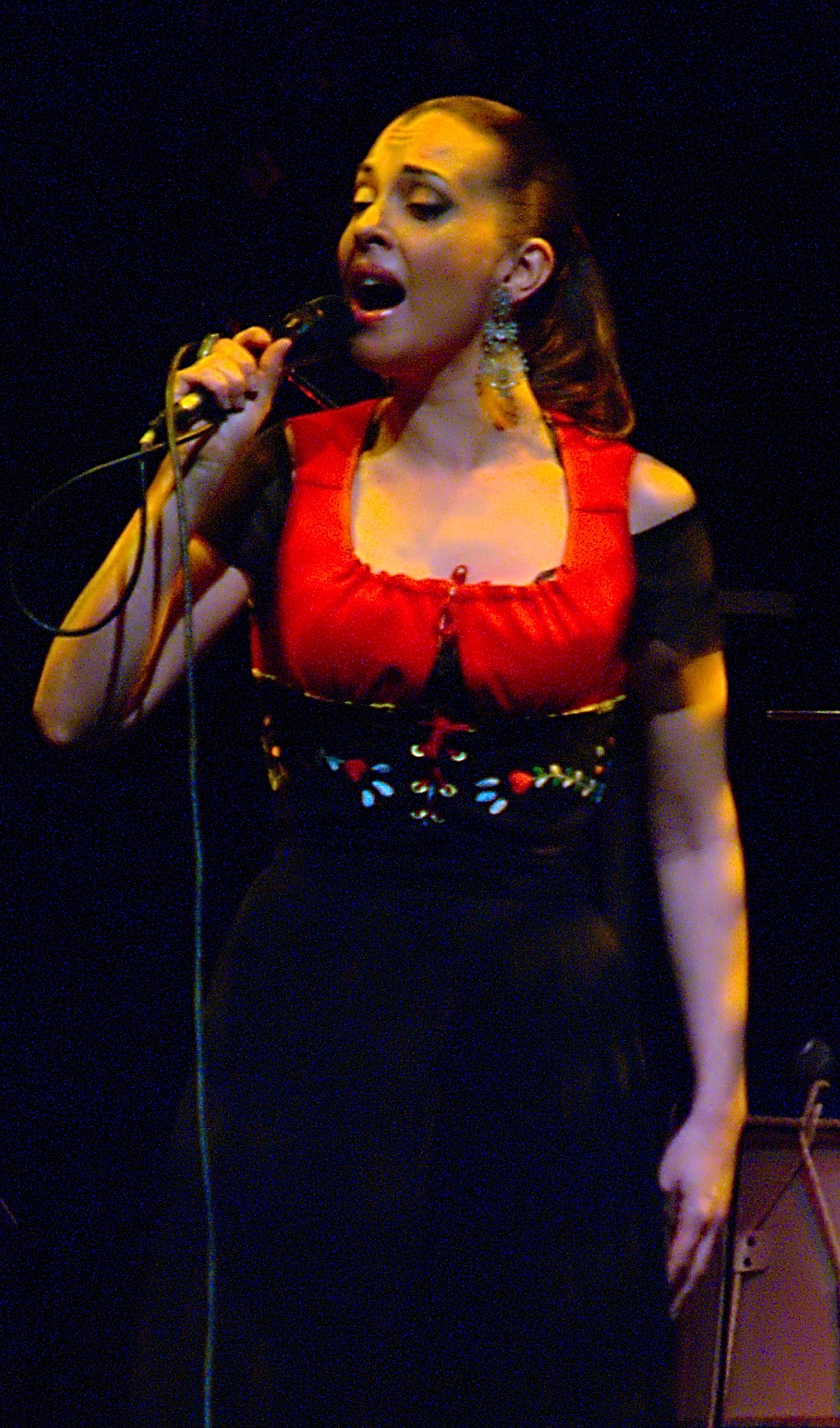
Salgueiro in 2009

Salgueiro joined Madredeus after other members noticed her singing at a bar in Lisbon. She left Madredeus in November 2007 to focus on solo work.

In 2007, Salgueiro performed a concert of Neapolitan music at the Teatro di San Carlo with the Solis String Quartet. In the same year, she released Você e Eu with Septeto de João Cristal; in this album, Salgueiro covers songs from well-known Brazilian artists such as Chico Buarque and Vinicius de Moraes.

In 2021, Salgueiro featured in two songs of Patrick Watson's singles album.

== Discography ==
=== With Madredeus ===
- Os Dias da MadreDeus (1987)
- Existir (1990)
- O Espírito da Paz (1994)
- Ainda: Original Motion Picture Soundtrack From The Film «Lisbon Story» (1995)
- O Paraíso (1997)
- Movimento (2001)
- Um Amor Infinito (2004)
- Faluas do Tejo (2005)

=== Solo ===
- Obrigado (2005)
- Você e Eu (2007; with Septeto de João Cristal)
- La Serena (2007; with Lusitânia Ensemble)
- Silence, Night & Dreams (2007, with Zbigniew Preisner)
- Matriz (2009; with Lusitânia Ensemble)
- O Mistério (2012)
- La Golondrina y el Horizonte (2015)
- O Horizonte (2016)
