= Rodrigo Leão (musician) =

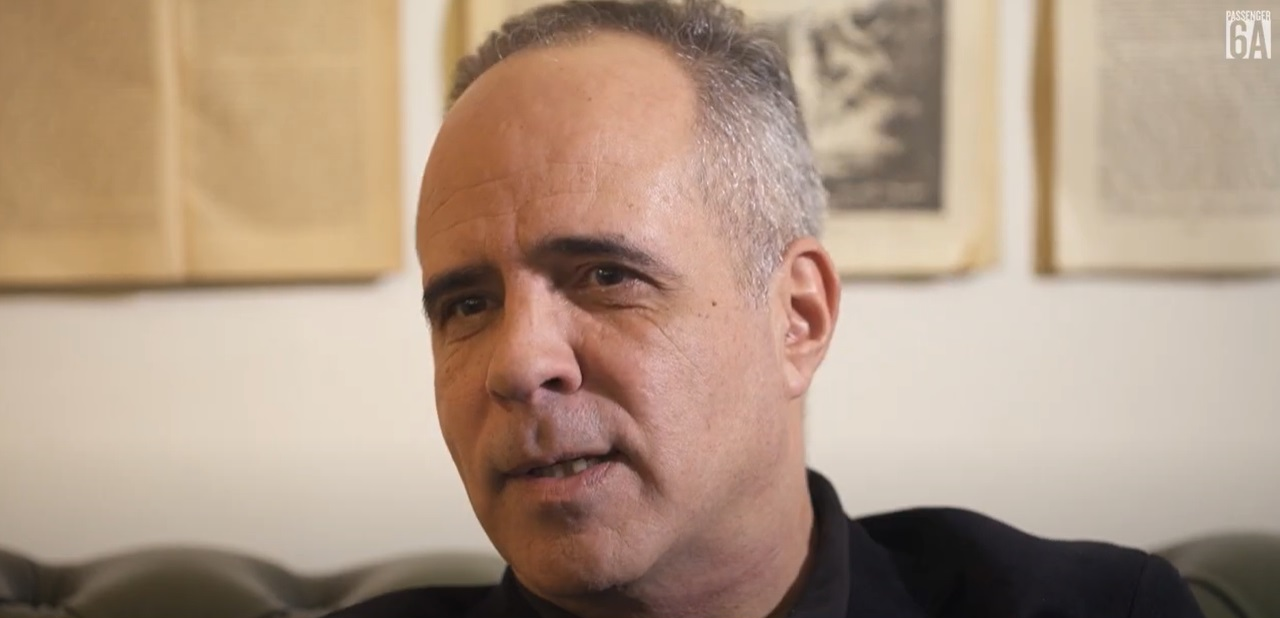

Background information
- Born: October 15, 1964 (age 61); Lisbon, Portugal
- Genres: New-age, minimal, world music
- Occupations: Musician, composer
- Instruments: Keyboards, guitar
- Years active: 1982–present
- Website: www.rodrigoleao.pt

Rodrigo Costa Leão Muñoz Miguez (born 15 October 1964), known professionally as Rodrigo Leão, is a Portuguese musician and songwriter. He became known in the 1980s as a member of the Portuguese groups Sétima Legião and Madredeus. In the 1990s, Leão launched his career as a solo artist, with multiple albums reaching number-one in the Portuguese album charts.

== Music career ==
In 1982, Leão was one of the founding members of Sétima Legião, one of the most successful bands in Portugal's 1980s rock scene.

In 1985, he started Madredeus with Pedro Ayres Magalhães and Sétima Legião's Gabriel Gomes as a sideline acoustic project. Madredeus received national and international acclaim and became one of Portugal's most successful music groups internationally.

In 1993, Rodrigo released a mostly instrumental solo album in a neo-classical, minimalist mode, titled Ave Mundi Luminar.

In 1994, with Sétima Legião on a long break, he left Madredeus to dedicate himself to his solo career. He has experimented with modern classical music and contemporary pop, joining electronics with string and horn sections. With the project Os Poetas, he composed music for poems from some of Portugal's greatest poets.

Over the years Leão has worked with various singers and musicians. Singers who have participated in Leão's music include Beth Gibbons (Portishead), Neil Hannon (The Divine Comedy), Stuart Staples (Tindersticks), Joan As Police Woman, Scott Matthew, Sónia Tavares (The Gift), Lula Pena, Rosa Passos and Thiago Petit. Leão has also performed with Ryuichi Sakamoto or Ludovico Einaudi.

Leão's music is also present in film and series soundtracks, including Lee Daniels’ Oscar-nominated historical drama The Butler (which won him an ASCAP award) and the TV documentary series Portugal – A Social Portrait by António Barreto. He has also composed the soundtracks for the mobile education apps Art Legacy and for the award-winning history app Back in Time.

== Discography ==
=== With Sétima Legião ===
- A Um Deus Desconhecido (1984)
- Mar d'Outubro (1987)
- De um Tempo Ausente (1989)
- O Fogo (1992)
- Auto de Fé (Live) (1994)
- Sexto Sentido (1999)

=== With Madredeus ===
- Os Dias da MadreDeus (1987)
- Existir (1990)
- Lisboa (1992)
- O Espírito da Paz (1994)
- Ainda (1995)

=== With Os Poetas ===
- Entre Nós e as Palavras (1997)

=== Solo albums ===
- Ave Mundi Luminar (1993)
- Mysterium (EP) (1995)
- Theatrum (1996)
- Alma Mater (2000)
- Pasión (Live) (2001)
- Cinema (2004)
- O Mundo (compilation with new material) (2006)
- Portugal, um Retrato Social (soundtrack album) (2007)
- A Mãe (2009)
- In Memoriam (2010) (extra CD from Ave Mundi Luminar new edition)
- A Montanha Mágica (2011)
- Songs (compilation with new material) (2012)
- The Butler (soundtrack album) (2013)
- O Espírito De Um País (Ao Vivo Na Assembleia Da República) (2014)
- Florestas Submersas (2015)
- A Vida Secreta das Máquinas (2015)
- O Retiro (with Orquestra e Coro Gulbenkian) (2015)
- Life Is Long (with Scott Matthew) (2016)
- 100 metros (soundtrack album) (2017)
- O Aniversário (compilation) (2018)
