= Pedro Ayres Magalhães =

Portuguese musician

Pedro Ayres Magalhães OIH
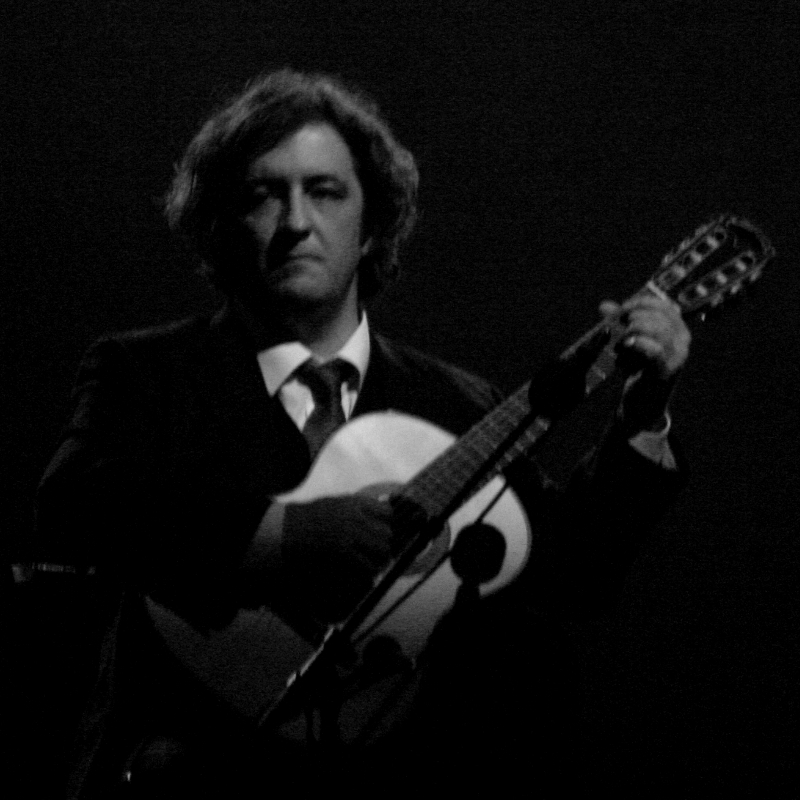
- Magalhães in 2005

Background information
- Born: Pedro Aires Ferreira de Almeida Gonçalves Magalhães; 31 July 1959 (age 67); Lisbon, Portugal
- Genres: Rock; new wave; folk; world music
- Instruments: Guitar, bass
- Years active: 1977–present

Pedro Aires Ferreira de Almeida Gonçalves Magalhães OIH (born 31 July 1959), known as Pedro Ayres Magalhães, is a Portuguese musician, best known as a founding member and the main songwriter of the musical group Madredeus. Magalhães has also been a member of the pop rock band Heróis do Mar and the Portuguese supergroup Resistência.

== Early life ==
Pedro Ayres Magalhães was born on 31 July 1959. He attended the Colégio Militar in Lisbon until the 5th grade, quitting shortly after the Carnation Revolution. Afterwards he joined the Academy of Musical Amateurs (Academia dos Amadores de Música), where he stayed until the age of 20.

Magalhães studied music and classical guitar during his youth.

== Career ==
=== 1977–1985: First bands and Heróis do Mar ===
In 1977, aged 17, Pedro Ayres Magalhães joined his first band, a punk rock group called Os Faíscas, as a bass player. He left the band about one year later, and formed the new wave band Corpo Diplomático, where he also played bass. Corpo Diplomático released one album in 1979 and disbanded the following year.

In 1981, he formed the pop rock band Heróis do Mar, along with two bandmates from Corpo Diplomático, Carlos Maria Trindade and Paulo Pedro Gonçalves. Heróis do Mar became a successful and influential band in Portugal thanks to hit singles such as "Amor" and "Paixão", and went on to release five studio albums from 1981 to 1988.

In 1982, Magalhães was one of the founders of the independent record label Fundação Atlântica. Magalhães released his only solo recording in 1985, the single "Ocidente Infernal".

=== 1985–1994: Madredeus and Resistência ===
In 1985, Magalhães and Rodrigo Leão, keyboardist of the band Sétima Legião, decided to start a side project outside of rock music. They were joined by Francisco Ribeiro and Gabriel Gomes in 1986 and later recruited Teresa Salgueiro to become the singer. In 1987, they named their group Madredeus, after the neighbourhood of Madre Deus in Lisbon where they recorded their first studio album. In December 1987, Madredeus released their first album, Os Dias da MadreDeus.

In 1989, Heróis do Mar decided to disband.

In May 1990, Madredeus released their second album Existir. The album reached number-one in the Portuguese album charts. The group did their first international tour in 1991, playing in Western Europe and Japan.

Around 1990, Magalhães, together with Tim (frontman of Xutos & Pontapés), Fernando Cunha and Miguel Ângelo (both from Delfins) formed a new band called Resistência. The idea for this band was to unite various musicians from the Portuguese rock sphere and create a mostly acoustic and voice-centered version of Portuguese pop-rock songs. The founding members were joined by Olavo Bilac (from Santos e Pecadores), Alexandre Frazão, Rui Luís Pereira, Fredo Margner, Fernando Júdice, Yuri Daniel and José Salgueiro for their first album and tour.

In 1991, Resistência released the debut album Palavras Ao Vento, which reached the top spot in the Portuguese album charts. The following year, they released the studio album Mano a Mano, followed by a live album in 1993, Armazém 22. Resistência went into hiatus in 1995.

=== 1994–2007: International success with Madredeus ===
Madredeus released their third album O Espírito da Paz in 1994. Around the same time, the group composed the soundtrack and participated in the film Lisbon Story by Wim Wenders, which was screened at the 1995 Cannes Film Festival and released in Europe afterwards. The film and its soundtrack, released with the title Ainda, gave Madredeus further international success and new audiences.

Magalhães toured extensively with Madredeus during the 1990s and early 2000s. The group played shows in Europe, Japan, United States, Mexico, Brazil and other Lusophone countries.

With their new lineup, Madredeus released four studio albums, two live albums, a compilation album and a remixes album until 2005. They achieved charted albums in Portugal, Spain, France, Italy, Belgium and the Netherlands.

In 2007, Teresa Salgueiro, Fernando Júdice and José Peixoto decided to leave Madredeus, leaving Magalhães and Carlos Maria Trindade as the only remaining members.

=== 2008–present: Banda Cósmica, return of Resistência ===
With Madredeus reduced to himself and Trindade, Magalhães cast a new ensemble of musicians with whom to play the music of Madredeus, to which he called A Banda Cósmica. Over the following three years, Magalhães, Trindade and A Banda Cósmica toured and released three albums, under the name Madredeus e a Banda Cósmica. In 2011, Magalhães decided to integrate two classically trained musicians, António Figueiredo and Luís Clode, and a classically trained singer, Beatriz Nunes, into Madredeus, thus ending the Banda Cósmica project. Madredeus have since released two albums, Essência and Capricho Sentimental.

In 2012, Magalhães joined the return of Resistência, starting with a concert in December at Campo Pequeno in Lisbon. The group has released two new albums since their return.

== Honours ==
- Officer of the Order of Prince Henry (9 June 1994)
