= Daniel Blaufuks =

Portuguese photographer

Daniel Blaufuks (born 1963) is a Portuguese photographer.

== Life and work ==
Blaufuks was born in Lisbon. He is the grandson of Polish and German Ashkenazi Jews who moved to Portugal in the late 1920s and 1930s. He moved to Germany in 1976 and returned to Portugal in 1983. He spent several years in the import business, which provided his first-and-last regular job. Blaufuks wanted to be a writer from an early age, but lacked confidence in his ability.

He studied photography and started his free-lancing career at the weekly music newspaper Blitz, followed by the newspaper O Independente and, later, the Portuguese Marie Claire and others. In 1989, he won the Portuguese Kodak Award despite the fact he had to settle in court with the company. In 1996, he was among the first eight chosen for the European Photography Award.

In 1991, Blaufuks published, with Paul Bowles, My Tangier, and in 1994, the London Diaries, followed by Ein Tag in Mostar (1995) and Uma Viagem a S. Petersburgo (1998). At one time or another, he lived in England and the United States and traveled in Europe, India, Russia, Africa and South America.

As well as producing many exhibitions, Blaufuks directed several films and videos: Life is not a picnic (1998, a film without a story), Black and White (2000, the story of a girl who becomes color-blind), Under Strange Skies (2002, a documentary on the Jewish refugees in Lisbon during and after the Second World War), Reversed Landscapes (2002, a film on Portuguese architecture), and Slightly Smaller than Indiana (2006, a documentary about contemporary Portugal).

== Publications ==
- Terez'n. Steidl, 2010. ISBN 978-3865216991.
- Works on Memory. Ffotogallery, 2012. ISBN 9781872771878.
- Pictures from Iran. London: Mack, 2012. ISBN 978-1907946219.
- Fabrica. Pierre von Kleist, 2013. ISBN 978-9899776326.
- Attempting Exhaustion. Akio Nagasawa, 2017. Edition of 600 copies.
