= Francisco Ribeiro =

Portuguese musician and composer (1965–2010)

For other uses, see Ribeirinho.

Francisco Ribeiro (15 March 1965 – 14 September 2010) was a Portuguese cellist, composer, lyricist, vocalist, arranger and record producer. He was born and died in Lisbon, Portugal.

Ribeiro is best known for being one of the founding members of Madredeus, a group that combined traditional Portuguese music with influences from contemporary folk music. While with Madredeus, Ribeiro collaborated on the soundtrack for the 1994 film Lisbon Story, directed by Wim Wenders.

In 1997, Ribeiro left Madredeus to complete his musical training in England. While in England, he was a member of the Gloucester and Stroud Symphony Orchestras from 2002 through 2003. He graduated from Bath Spa University in Music and Composition, and also studied at Gloucester Tech College while attending the Music Academy of Santa Cecilia.

Ribeiro returned to Portugal in 2006. In December 2009, he released The Junction Well, the first album by his personal project Desiderata. Ribeiro was actively involved in various music projects and festivals.

Ribeiro died in Lisbon from liver cancer at the age of 45.
