= List of freguesias of Portugal: A =

The freguesias (civil parishes) of Portugal are listed in by municipality according to the following format:

- concelho
  - freguesias

== Abrantes ==
- Aldeia do Mato
- Alferrarede
- Alvega
- Bemposta
- Carvalhal (Abrantes)
- Concavada
- Fontes
- Martinchel
- Mouriscas
- Pego
- Rio de Moinhos
- Rossio ao Sul do Tejo
- São Facundo
- São João
- São Miguel do Rio Torto
- São Vicente
- Souto
- Tramagal
- Vale das Mós

== Águeda ==
- Agadão
- Aguada de Baixo
- Aguada de Cima
- Águeda
- Barrô
- Belazaima do Chão
- Borralha
- Castanheira do Vouga
- Espinhel
- Fermentelos
- Lamas do Vouga
- Macieira de Alcoba
- Macinhata do Vouga
- Óis da Ribeira
- Préstimo
- Recardães
- Segadães
- Travassô
- Trofa
- Valongo do Vouga

== Aguiar da Beira ==
- Aguiar da Beira
- Carapito
- Cortiçada
- Coruche
- Dornelas
- Eirado
- Forninhos
- Gradiz
- Pena Verde
- Pinheiro
- Sequeiros
- Souto de Aguiar da Beira
- Valverde

== Alandroal ==
- Alandroal (Nossa Senhora da Conceição)
- Capelins (Santo António)
- Juromenha (Nossa Senhora do Loreto)
- Santiago Maior
- São Brás dos Matos (Mina do Bugalho)
- Terena (São Pedro)

== Albergaria-a-Velha ==
- Albergaria-a-Velha
- Alquerubim
- Angeja
- Branca
- Frossos
- Ribeira de Fráguas
- São João de Loure
- Valmaior

== Albufeira ==
- Albufeira
- Ferreiras
- Guia
- Olhos de Água
- Paderne

== Alcácer do Sal ==
- Alcácer do Sal (Santa Maria do Castelo)
- Alcácer do Sal (Santiago)
- Comporta
- Santa Susana
- São Martinho
- Torrão

== Alcanena ==
- Alcanena
- Bugalhos
- Espinheiro
- Louriceira
- Malhou
- Minde
- Moitas Venda
- Monsanto
- Serra de Santo António
- Vila Moreira

== Alcobaça ==
- Alcobaça
- Alfeizerão
- Aljubarrota (Prazeres)
- Aljubarrota (São Vicente)
- Alpedriz
- Bárrio
- Benedita
- Cela
- Coz
- Évora de Alcobaça
- Maiorga
- Martingança
- Montes
- Pataias
- São Martinho do Porto
- Turquel
- Vestiaria
- Vimeiro (Alcobaça)

== Alcochete ==
- Alcochete
- Samouco
- São Francisco

== Alcoutim ==
- Alcoutim
- Giões
- Martim Longo
- Pereiro
- Vaqueiros

== Alenquer ==
- Abrigada
- Aldeia Galega da Merceana
- Aldeia Gavinha
- Alenquer (Santo Estêvão)
- Alenquer (Triana)
- Cabanas de Torres
- Cadafais
- Carnota
- Carregado
- Meca
- Olhalvo
- Ota
- Pereiro de Palhacana
- Ribafria
- Ventosa
- Vila Verde dos Francos

== Alfândega da Fé ==
- Agrobom
- Alfândega da Fé
- Cerejais
- Eucisia
- Ferradosa
- Gebelim
- Gouveia
- Parada
- Pombal
- Saldonha
- Sambade
- Sendim da Ribeira
- Sendim da Serra
- Soeima
- Vale Pereiro
- Vales
- Valverde
- Vilar Chão
- Vilarelhos
- Vilares de Vilariça

== Alijó ==
- Alijó
- Amieiro
- Carlão
- Casal de Loivos
- Castedo
- Cotas
- Favaios
- Pegarinhos
- Pinhão
- Pópulo
- Ribalonga
- Sanfins do Douro
- Santa Eugénia
- São Mamede de Ribatua
- Vale de Mendiz
- Vila Chã
- Vila Verde
- Vilar de Maçada
- Vilarinho de Cotas

== Aljezur ==
- Aljezur
- Bordeira
- Odeceixe
- Rogil

== Aljustrel ==
- Aljustrel
- Ervidel
- Messejana
- Rio de Moinhos
- São João de Negrilhos

== Almada ==
- Almada
- Cacilhas
- Caparica
- Charneca de Caparica
- Costa da Caparica
- Cova da Piedade
- Feijó
- Laranjeiro
- Pragal
- Sobreda
- Trafaria

== Almeida ==
- Ade
- Aldeia Nova
- Almeida
- Amoreira
- Azinhal
- Cabreira
- Castelo Bom
- Castelo Mendo
- Freineda
- Freixo
- Junça
- Leomil
- Malhada Sorda
- Malpartida
- Mesquitela
- Mido
- Miuzela
- Monte Perobolço
- Nave de Haver
- Naves
- Parada
- Peva
- Porto de Ovelha
- São Pedro de Rio Seco
- Senouras
- Vale da Mula
- Vale de Coelha
- Vale Verde
- Vilar Formoso

== Almeirim ==
- Almeirim
- Benfica do Ribatejo
- Fazendas de Almeirim
- Raposa

== Almodôvar ==
- Aldeia dos Fernandes
- Almodôvar
- Gomes Aires
- Rosário
- Santa Clara-a-Nova
- Santa Cruz
- São Barnabé
- Senhora da Graça de Padrões

== Alpiarça ==
- Alpiarça
- Alter do Chão
- Chancelaria
- Cunheira
- Seda

== Alvaiázere ==
- Almoster
- Alvaiázere
- Maçãs de Caminho
- Maçãs de Dona Maria
- Pelmá
- Pussos
- Rego da Murta

== Alvito ==
- Alvito
- Vila Nova da Baronia

== Amadora ==
- Alfornelos
- Alfragide
- Brandoa
- Buraca
- Damaia
- Falagueira
- Mina
- Reboleira
- São Brás
- Venda Nova
- Venteira

== Amarante ==
- Aboadela
- Aboim
- Amarante (São Gonçalo)
- Ansiães
- Ataíde
- Bustelo
- Canadelo
- Candemil
- Carneiro
- Carvalho de Rei
- Cepelos
- Chapa
- Figueiró (Santa Cristina)
- Figueiró (Santiago)
- Fregim
- Freixo de Baixo
- Freixo de Cima
- Fridão
- Gatão
- Gondar
- Gouveia (São Simão)
- Jazente
- Lomba
- Louredo
- Lufrei
- Madalena
- Mancelos
- Oliveira
- Olo
- Padronelo
- Real
- Rebordelo
- Salvador do Monte
- Sanche
- Telões
- Travanca
- Várzea
- Vila Caiz
- Vila Chã do Marão
- Vila Garcia

== Amares ==
- Amares
- Barreiros
- Besteiros
- Bico
- Bouro (Santa Maria)
- Caires
- Caldelas
- Carrazedo
- Dornelas
- Ferreiros
- Figueiredo
- Fiscal
- Goães
- Lago
- Paranhos
- Paredes Secas
- Portela
- Prozelo
- Rendufe
- Sequeiros
- Seramil
- Torre
- Vilela

== Anadia ==
- Aguim
- Amoreira da Gândara
- Ancas
- Arcos
- Avelãs de Caminho
- Avelãs de Cima
- Mogofores
- Moita
- Óis do Bairro
- Paredes do Bairro
- Sangalhos
- São Lourenço do Bairro
- Tamengos
- Vila Nova de Monsarros
- Vilarinho do Bairro

== Angra do Heroísmo ==
- Altares
- Cinco Ribeiras
- Doze Ribeiras
- Feteira
- Nossa Senhora da Conceição
- Porto Judeu
- Posto Santo
- Raminho
- Ribeirinha
- Santa Bárbara
- Santa Luzia
- São Bartolomeu de Regatos
- São Bento
- São Mateus da Calheta
- São Pedro
- Sé
- Serreta
- Terra Chã
- Vila de São Sebastião

== Ansião ==
- Alvorge
- Ansião
- Avelar
- Chão de Couce
- Lagarteira
- Pousaflores
- Santiago da Guarda
- Torre de Vale de Todos

== Arcos de Valdevez ==
- Aboim das Choças
- Aguiã
- Alvora
- Arcos de Valdevez (Salvador)
- Arcos de Valdevez (São Paio)
- Ázere
- Cabana Maior
- Cabreiro
- Carralcova
- Cendufe
- Couto
- Eiras
- Ermelo
- Extremo
- Gavieira
- Giela
- Gondoriz
- Grade
- Guilhadeses
- Jolda (Madalena)
- Jolda (São Paio)
- Loureda
- Mei
- Miranda
- Monte Redondo
- Oliveira
- Paçô
- Padreiro (Salvador)
- Padreiro (Santa Cristina)
- Padroso
- Parada
- Portela
- Prozelo
- Rio Cabrão
- Rio de Moinhos
- Rio Frio
- Sá
- Sabadim
- Santar
- São Cosme e São Damião
- São Jorge
- Senharei
- Sistelo
- Soajo
- Souto
- Tabaçô
- Távora (Santa Maria)
- Távora (São Vicente)
- Vale
- Vila Fonche
- Vilela

== Arganil ==
- Anceriz
- Arganil
- Barril de Alva
- Benfeita
- Celavisa
- Cepos
- Cerdeira
- Coja
- Folques
- Moura da Serra
- Piódão
- Pomares
- Pombeiro da Beira
- São Martinho da Cortiça
- Sarzedo
- Secarias
- Teixeira
- Vila Cova de Alva

== Armamar ==
- Aldeias
- Aricera
- Armamar
- Cimbres
- Coura
- Folgosa
- Fontelo
- Goujoim
- Coura
- Queimadela
- Santa Cruz
- Santiago
- Santo Adrião
- São Cosmado
- São Martinho das Chãs
- São Romão
- Tões
- Vacalar
- Vila Seca

== Arouca ==
- Albergaria da Serra
- Alvarenga
- Arouca
- Burgo
- Cabreiros
- Canelas
- Chave
- Covelo de Paivó
- Escariz
- Espiunca
- Fermedo
- Janarde
- Mansores
- Moldes
- Rossas
- Santa Eulália
- São Miguel do Mato
- Tropeço
- Urrô
- Várzea

== Arraiolos ==
- Arraiolos
- Gafanhoeira (São Pedro)
- Igrejinha
- Sabugueiro
- Santa Justa
- São Gregório
- Vimieiro

== Arronches ==
- Assunção
- Esperança
- Mosteiros

== Arruda dos Vinhos ==
- Arranhó
- Arruda dos Vinhos
- Cardosas
- Santiago dos Velhos

== Aveiro ==
- Aradas
- Cacia
- Eirol
- Eixo
- Esgueira
- Glória
- Nariz
- Nossa Senhora de Fátima
- Oliveirinha
- Requeixo
- Santa Joana
- São Bernardo
- São Jacinto
- Vera Cruz

== Avis ==
- Alcôrrego
- Aldeia Velha
- Avis
- Benavila
- Ervedal
- Figueira e Barros
- Maranhão
- Valongo

== Azambuja ==
- Alcoentre
- Aveiras de Baixo
- Aveiras de Cima
- Azambuja
- Maçussa
- Manique do Intendente
- Vale do Paraíso
- Vila Nova da Rainha
- Vila Nova de São Pedro
