= Caparica (disambiguation) =

Caparica is a former civil parish in the municipality (concelho) of Almada, Lisbon Metropolitan Area, Portugal.

== See also ==
- Charneca de Caparica
- Costa de Caparica
