= Fermentelos =

Civil parish in Portugal

DarkFrame
- Civil parish
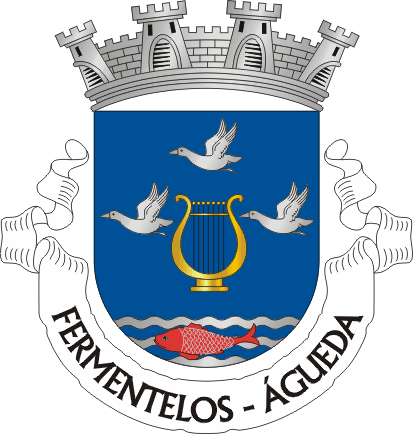
- Coat of arms

- Location in Portugal
- Coordinates: 40.567°N 8.523°W
- Country: Portugal
- Region: Centro
- Intermunic. comm.: Região de Leiria
- District: Aveiro
- Municipality: Olhão

Area
  - Total: 8.58 km^{2} (3.31 sq mi)

Population (201165)
  - Total: 3,258
  - Density: 380/km^{2} (983/sq mi)
- Time zone: UTC+00:00 (WET)
  - Summer (DST): UTC+01:00 (WEST)
- Postal code: 3750
- Area code: 234
- Patron: Santo André
- Website: http://www.jf-fermentelos.pt/

Fermentelos is a civil parish in the municipality of Águeda in the district of Aveiro, Portugal. The population in 2011 was 3,258, in an area of 8.58 km^{2}. A minor village within an independent parish, the area was elevated to the status of vila (English: town) on 5 May 1928.

== History ==
=== Legend ===
A popular legend tells of three brothers, who had become lost in the fog, as they navigated the River Cértima and were guided to the Pateira. Impressed by the beauty of the region, they decided to stay and fished the waters of the river to sell to the neighboring villages. The three brothers (André, Domingos and Tomé) then tried to give the area a name, and began to argue. The youngest proposed Ferment and quickly got into conflict with the other two, leading to a duel. From the Portuguese name for ferment+duel developed the name Fermentelos.

=== Medieval ===
The first record of Fermentelos (1050) came from inventories by Gonçalo Viegas and his wife Flâmula, that elaborated on the significance of the vila and peoples. By 1077, a similar inventory was carried out, but this time included the possessions of Paio Gonçalves' lands. Around this time a reference to a Faramontanellos situated along the margins River Cértima appeared in document 549 in Diplomata et Charte.

From the earliest references, there were horse-mounted huntsmen, who paid the donatários a fee to hunt on lands designated for hunting, which were known as Foramontanos. During King Afonso II's inquiries in 1220, the local name had evolved to Foramontaelos, whose significance was the base terms fora+monte (likewise montaria, monteiro), which had its meaning in "mounted hunting on horseback". When these lands were small, or if the existence of games was little, the referred to these areas as Foramontanelos. These adjectives evolved into proper nouns, Foramontões e Foramontanelos, and finally appeared in documents, such as the Manuelino foral.

The King's investigations identified a large quality and quantity of cultivated goods, yet there is no reference to inhabitants, even as adjacent territories were populated. Foramontaelos was a village and all royal"; it was a royal domain that produced wheat, wine, a chickens, eggs, cheese and butter, but little was known if inhabitants only cultivated these lands, or resided within their boundaries.

=== Mata Real ===
King Manuel incorporated Formentelos into the now extinct municipality of Óis da Ribeira on 2 June 1516, when he established its foral. The area of Formentelos was designated as Mata Real de Perrães, Paradela, e Louredo (English: King's Land of Perrães, Paradela, e Louredo), and were direct neighbors of lands occupied by the Bishop of Coimbra and the Convent of Lourã. By the end of the 15th century, the King was obliged to entrust in Anrique de Almeida, his sheriff in Aveiro, with the caretaker-ship of the Mata de Perrães, in order to secure his local lands from vagrants who took deer and grazed their pigs on the lands. In 1626, Lourenço de Almeida Alcoforado, son of the niece of Anrique de Almeida, who was inheritor of the royal privileges, sold these rights to Diogo de Teles Castel-Branco on 17 April 1626, in the presence of the notary Belchior Correia de Vasconcelos.

In 1672 a formal site plan of the Mata Real was undertaken by the King, concluded that the land designated as the King's land had diminished considerably; owing to the necessity to examine these domains by boat, it was determined that a portion had become a part of the Pateira de Fermentelos.

=== Modern ===
The caretaker-ship of Fermentelos continued to be the responsibility of the family of Diogo de Teles since 1626, until the middle of the 19th century. Afterward the House of Atalho, which was always responsible for justice, resolving property disputes and collecting rents took over the role of the Crown's Foreign Judge (Portuguese: Juíz de Fora). During the Liberal Wars, it was inherited by a noblewoman, whose husband was a proponent of Miguel of Portugal. Even after the 1822 and 1834 conflicts, she supported absolutist forces and their local interests, and forgot these rebels' rents.

Until 1832, the parish of Fermentelos was governed by noblemen under the auspicious of the Foreign Judge, a ceremonial title-holder that administered various lands owned by the monarch. Ferementelos became an independent parish when on 16 May 1832, the laws were abolished and a system of parishes, municipalities and districts were instituted that eliminated many of the titles and honorifics associated with the ruling-classes, including the Juizes de Fora and local sheriffs.

The village of Fermentelos was granted a parish charter on 5 May 1928.

== Geography ==
Fermentalos is located on the far south-western frontier of the municipality of Águeda, on the border with the municipalities of Oliveira do Bairro (to the south) and Aveiro (to the northwest). Similarly, it is fronted by the parishes of Requeixo (to the northwest), Óis da Ribeira (to the northeast), Espinhel (to the east) and Oiã (to the south and southeast). Its northern border is naturally divided by the Pateira de Fermentelos, a freshwater lake which it shares with its northern neighbors.

Access to the community is by the E.N.235 (from Aveiro and Oliveira do Bairro), and from Águeda center along the E.N.333, with access relative to the southern Aveiro A1 corridor.

=== Eco-regions/protected areas ===
Pateira de Fermentelos - a natural lake formed from the confluences of the Cértima and Águeda Rivers. It is the largest natural lake in the Iberian peninsula, and a zone rich in flora and fauna, including species of aquatic birds, such as: the little bittern, purple heron kingfisher, western marsh harrier, black kite and various types of duck. In addition, local fish, such as largemouth bass, Esox, carp, mullet, and perch, and the commercial popularity of crayfish and rays, support the freshwater fishing industry of the region.

=== Human geography ===
The 2001 Census revealed that 3148 inhabitants (consisting of 963 families) reside within the parish, making it the 6th largest parish (by population), as well as the 4th most dense demographically. The 2008 registry of voters included 2550 inhabitants available to vote.

The area is serviced by municipal water, treatment, electricity and basic sanitation services, and provides visitors with hotel, restaurants, cafes, commerce and three financial service centers.

Educational services include one kindergarten, two primary and one intermediary schools in the public system.

== Architecture ==
=== Civic ===
- Monumento ao Emigrante (English: Monument to the Emigrants)

=== Religious ===
- Cruzeiro - located in the small square; a base of four columns, recently remodeled with a new cross applied to the central column;
- Igreja Matriz de Santo André (English: Matriz Church of Saint Andrew) - reconstructed in 1911;
- Capela de Nossa Senhora da Saúde (English: Chapel of Our Lady of Health);
- Capela de Santo Inácio (English: Chapel of Ignatius of Antioch).

== Culture ==
The parish is rich with public associations of a cultural, social and recreational importance, a seniors center, nursery, two public bands, two folklore groups, the Museum of the Institute Joáo Tomás Nunes, a ranked football team, a hunting club (Os Caçadores da Pateira), the Associação Equitação Haras de Portugal, a youth group, scouts and various other groups.

=== Festivities ===
The primary festival of importance is the feast day of its patron saint (Saint Andrew), celebrated on 30 November annually as both a religious and secular holiday. Other celebrations include the festival of the Sacred Heart of Jesus (Portuguese: Sagrado Coração de Jesus), in June, the festival of Our Lady of Heart (Portuguese: Nossa Senhora do Coração), on 14–15 August, and the parochial fair on the last weekend of September.
