= António Cardoso (art historian) =

Portuguese art historian, painter and educational television producer

- Born: António Cardoso Pinheiro de Carvalho; 21 July 1932; Salvador do Monte, Amarante, Portugal
- Died: 3 June 2021 (aged 88); Porto, Portugal
- Education: Academia Alvarez; Escola Superior de Belas-Artes do Porto; University of Porto (PhD)
- Occupations: Art historian; Painter; Professor; Museum director
- Employer: University of Porto
- Known for: Educational television (Televisão Escolar, Telescola); direction of the Museu Municipal Amadeo de Souza-Cardoso

António Cardoso Pinheiro de Carvalho (21 July 1932 – 3 June 2021), commonly known as António Cardoso, was a Portuguese art historian, painter, university professor and museum director. Born in Salvador do Monte, in the municipality of Amarante, he was involved in the early development of educational television in Portugal, presenting programmes for Televisão Escolar and later directing programmes for Telescola, the country's educational television system. He was a professor at the University of Porto and director of the Museu Municipal Amadeo de Souza-Cardoso in Amarante.

== Early life and education ==
Cardoso was born on 21 July 1932 in Salvador do Monte, in the municipality of Amarante, Portugal. He completed a teacher-training course in 1951 and began working in primary education. During the 1950s, he studied painting at the Academia Alvarez in Porto and subsequently attended the Escola Superior de Belas-Artes do Porto. Cardoso later studied History at the Faculty of Arts of the University of Porto, graduating in 1974. He received a doctorate in Art History from the Faculty of Arts of the University of Porto in 1992, with a dissertation entitled O Arquitecto José Marques da Silva e a Arquitectura no Norte do País na primeira metade do século XX.

== Educational television and Telescola ==
Cardoso became involved in educational television in the early 1960s through his association with the Instituto de Meios Audiovisuais and the Instituto de Tecnologia Educativa. His entry into television education followed a meeting with school inspector Baptista Martins, who was involved in the development of Telescola. Cardoso subsequently participated in the preparation and presentation of educational television programmes.

Cardoso initially presented programmes for Televisão Escolar between 1963 and 1965. His work involved combining teaching with visual illustration, including drawing to explain educational subjects during broadcasts. He studied contemporary approaches to art education and audiovisual teaching, drawing on the work of Portuguese and international educators and researchers.

Telescola was established in 1964 as an alternative means of providing compulsory education, particularly in areas where access to schools and teachers was limited. Regular Televisão Escolar broadcasts began on 23 October 1965. Cardoso worked as a director of educational television from 1965 to 1974, contributing to the development of televised teaching during the programme's formative years. In December 1967, he participated in the fifth international seminar of the European Broadcasting Union on educational television, held in Basel, Switzerland.

Following the end of his television commission, Cardoso returned to teaching and participated in educational initiatives across Portugal. In 1977, he became director of the Curso do CPTV/ITE, a position he held until 1981. He also organised teacher-training activities for primary and secondary education, including programmes broadcast by RTP. In this role, he advocated an educational approach centred on understanding pupils, encouraging creativity, developing critical thinking and respecting individual learning abilities.

Telescola became an important part of the history of Portuguese education. Its use of television as a teaching medium enabled educational provision to reach communities with limited access to conventional schools. Subsequent historical research has examined its role as an innovative educational subsystem and its contribution to the expansion of compulsory education in Portugal.

== Academic career and research ==
In 1981, Cardoso joined the teaching staff of the Faculty of Arts of the University of Porto, where he taught Art History and related subjects. His research focused on Portuguese architecture, particularly the work of architect José Marques da Silva, and on the painter Amadeo de Souza-Cardoso.

His doctoral research on Marques da Silva was subsequently published as O Arquitecto José Marques da Silva e a Arquitectura no Norte do País na primeira metade do século XX (1997). He also contributed to the Catálogo raisonné of the work of Amadeo de Souza-Cardoso, published by the Calouste Gulbenkian Foundation in 2008.

Between 1996 and 2001, he represented the University of Porto on the Porto Municipal Council's Heritage Commission. He retired from the university in 2002.

== Artistic career ==
Alongside his work in education and art history, Cardoso pursued a career as a painter, draughtsman and printmaker. He studied at the Academia Alvarez in Porto, where he worked under the guidance of Jaime Isidoro and António Sampaio. His early paintings included landscapes and urban subjects, and his artistic practice subsequently developed towards more gestural and abstract forms of expression.

In 1959, his painting Paisagem III was included in the Portuguese selection for the 1st Biennale de Paris. The work, an oil painting on hardboard measuring 460 by 550 millimetres, depicts a landscape organised around a river and its banks. The Portuguese painting representation received the Critics' Prize, with works by several contemporary Portuguese artists included in the selection.

Cardoso held his first solo exhibition at Galeria Divulgação in 1967. His subsequent artistic production included painting, drawing and printmaking. He exhibited individually and collectively in Portugal and abroad, and his works entered collections including those of the Fundação Calouste Gulbenkian and the Museu Municipal Amadeo de Souza-Cardoso.

== Museum direction and cultural heritage ==
Cardoso was closely associated with the cultural life of Amarante and the development of the Museu Municipal Amadeo de Souza-Cardoso. In the 1990s, he became director of the museum, a position he held until his death in 2021.

He had been involved in the museum's development from its early decades. As director, he oversaw the publication of its first collection catalogue in 1997 and contributed to the preservation and promotion of the artistic heritage of Amarante, including the legacy of painter Amadeo de Souza-Cardoso. Cardoso also regularly served on the jury of the Amadeo de Souza-Cardoso Prize, participating in the selection of its biennal laureates.

He also played an important role in the establishment of the Fundação Instituto Arquitecto José Marques da Silva, now known as the Fundação Marques da Silva, in Porto. His research and advocacy contributed to the preservation and study of the architect's documentary and architectural legacy.

== Death and legacy ==
Cardoso died in Porto on 3 June 2021, aged 88.

In 2022, the Museu Municipal Amadeo de Souza-Cardoso organised an exhibition entitled António Cardoso, Diretor… "desde que nasci…" (António Cardoso, Director… "since I was born…"), displaying his paintings, drawings and personal and institutional documents. The same year, the Fundação Marques da Silva presented Isto não é só um quadro: António Cardoso para além da evidência (This is not just a painting: António Cardoso beyond the obvious), an exhibition exploring his artistic, academic and cultural activities.

== Selected publications ==
- O Arquitecto José Marques da Silva e a Arquitectura no Norte do País na primeira metade do século XX (1997).
- Sínteses = Arte + António Cardoso (2004).
- 20 Desenhos de António Cardoso (2006).
- Contribution to the Catálogo raisonné of the work of Amadeo de Souza-Cardoso (2008).

== Cultural journalism ==
Cardoso contributed to Portuguese cultural periodicals, including Coordenada – Cadernos de convívio (1958–1959). He also directed the cultural page Página Quatro of the Amarante publication Flor do Tâmega and collaborated on the cultural supplement Ângulo from 1966.
