= Vila Seca =

Vila Seca may refer to:

== Places ==
=== Portugal ===
- Vila Seca (Armamar), a civil parish in the municipality of Armamar
- Vila Seca (Barcelos), a parish in the municipality of Barcelos
- Vila Seca (Condeixa-a-Nova), a civil parish in the municipality of Condeixa-a-Nova

=== Spain ===
- Vila-seca, a municipality in the comarca of Tarragonès
