= Igreja de São Miguel (Armamar) =

Church in Armamar, Portugal

Coordinates: 41.109432°N 7.692711°W

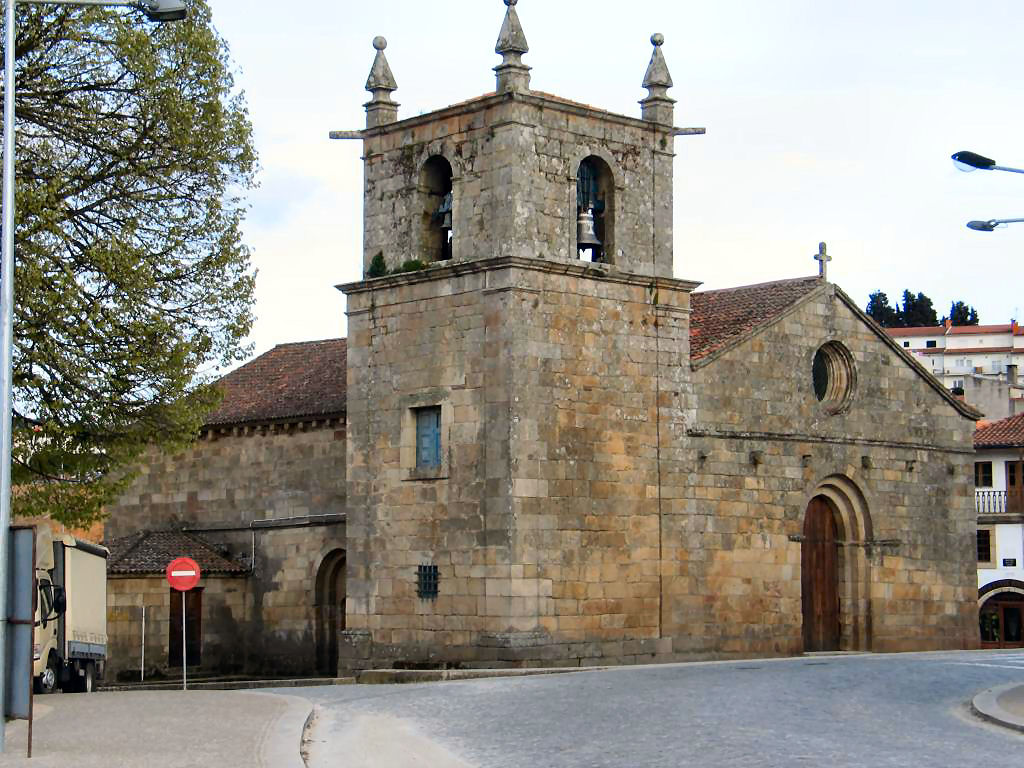
Main facade of the main church of Armamar

Igreja de São Miguel (Church of São Miguel) is a church designated as a National Monument in Portugal. Its construction possibly dates back to the 12th century, and is the only national monument in the municipality of Armamar, Portugal. It underwent several interventions after the construction in the 17th and 18th centuries.

According to tradition, the church was built with stones from the demolished Armamar Castle, before the foundation of the Salzedas Monastery. Opinions in this regard are divided: there are those who consider that the church was founded by Egas Moniz, aide of King D. Afonso Henriques; others say that on the initiative of Egas Moniz a primitive temple, perhaps a chapel, would have been built, and not the current church that would have succeeded him. Of all the opinions, the end of the 12th century / the beginning of the 13th century is registered as a probable date of its construction.

Built in a combination of Romanesque and Gothic styles, it has a Latin rectangular floor plan, with three naves and a bell tower with a square floor plan. Both the facade and the interior are built in granite stonework. At the rear is the chancel with a quarter-sphere cover.
