= Ponte de Prozelo =

Bridge of Prozelo Ponte de Prozelo
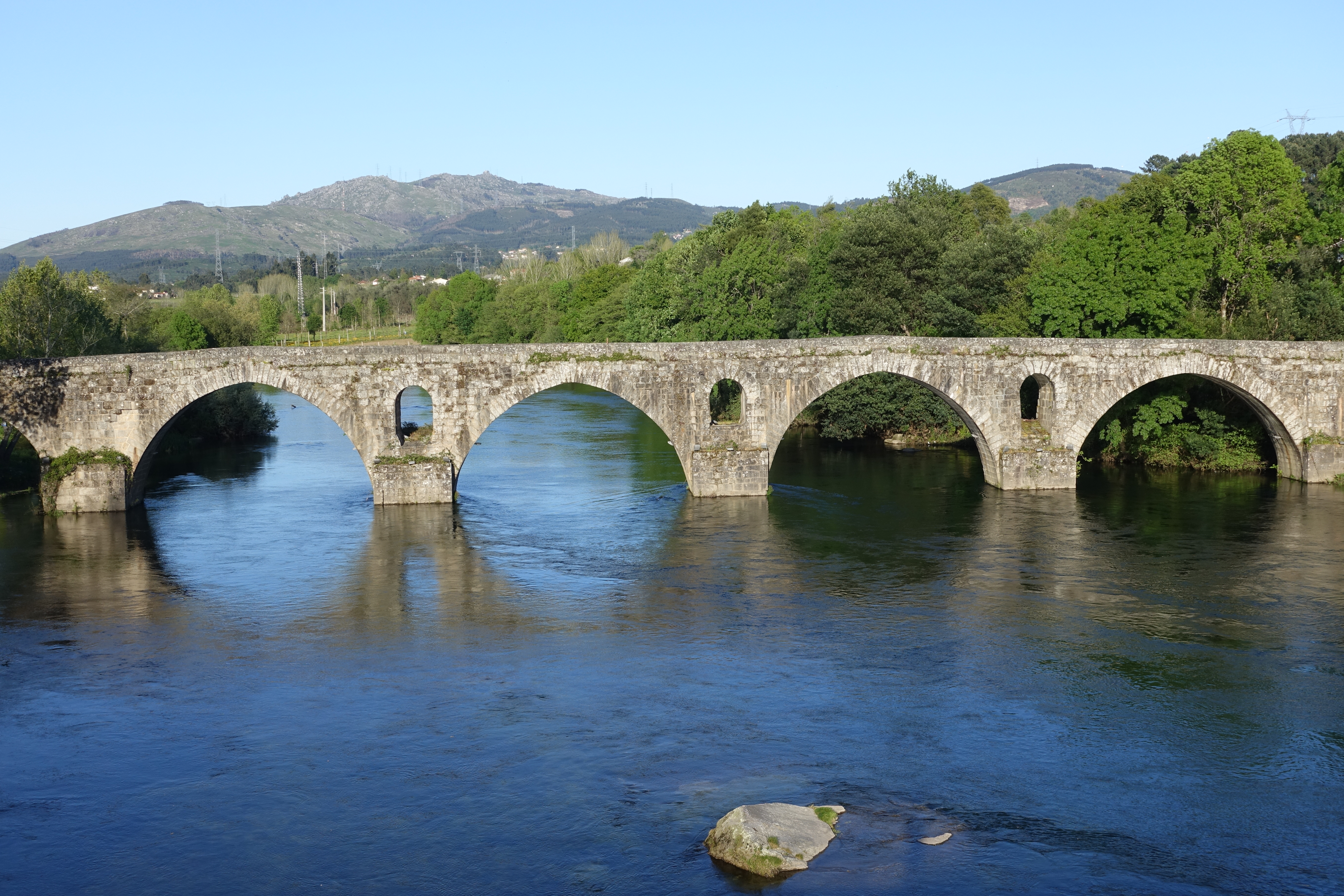
- Coordinates: 41°36′58″N 8°20′33″W
- Carries: Pedestrians and bicycles
- Crosses: Cávado River
- Locale: Ferreiros, Prozelo e Besteiros, Amares (Braga District), Portugal
- Official name: Ponte de Prozelo/Ponte do Porto
- Other name: Port Bridge
- Heritage status: National Monument; Monumento Nacional; Decree (16 June 1910), DG136 (23 June 1910)

Characteristics
- Material: Granite
- Total length: 150 metres (490 ft)
- Width: 2.8 metres (9.2 ft)
- No. of spans: 4

History
- Construction start: 14th century

Location
- Interactive map of Bridge of Prozelo

The Bridge of Prozelo (Portuguese: Ponte de Prozelo) is a bridge in the civil parish of Ferreiros, Prozelo e Besteiros, municipality of Amares, in the Portuguese district of Braga, that crosses the Cávado River.

== History ==
Sometime during the middle of the 14th century, the bridge was constructed, owing to the acronyms on the structure.

The roadway had its origins in Braga, crossing the Cávado River over the port bridge in the direction of Amares (where a shelter existed), bisecting at the path to Geira, to the east, or to north, passing the River Homen at the bridge of Caldelas/Rodas in the direction of Ponte da Barca. Passage along the Cávado before the construction of the port bridge was made to the west between Ribeiro and Lago.

== Architecture ==
The bridge is situated in a rural, isolated position over the River Cávado, between the parishes of Pousada (in Braga) and Prozelo (in Amares), in the locality of Ponte do Porto, 55 kilometres (34 mi) along the Estrada Nacional E.N.205 linking Amares and Póvoa de Lanhoso. There are several houses that line the roadway near the entrance-way to the north of the bridge. The banks of the river is covered in vegetation.

The bridge is approximately 150 metres (490 ft) long and 2.8 metres (9.2 ft) over a flat surface with two access ramps. The four arches in the horizontal section of the bridge are broken and the high part of the three piers that separate them have eyelets. The remaining arcs, ten in number, have unequal dimensions and shape. It includes buttresses with triangular and rectangular talhamares, with the a platform protected by low parapets in granite.

== See also ==
- List of bridges in Portugal

=== Sources ===
- Capela, M. (1895), Miliários do Conventus Bracarangustanos em Portugal (in Portuguese), Porto, Portugal, p. 59
- PEREIRA, F. Alves, Pontes Medievais nos Arcos de Valdevez. Apêndices: II. A ponte do Pôrto em Amares, Portucale, I (in Portuguese), pp. 254–256
- SILVA, Domingos M. da (1959), Entre Homem e Cávado: 1 e 2. Monografia do concelho de Amares (in Portuguese), Amares, Portugal
- ALMEIDA, Carlos A. F. (1968), Vias Medievais. Entre-Douro-e-Minho (in Portuguese), Porto, Portugal, pp. 196–197
- ALMEIDA, Carlos A. F. (1973), Os Caminhos e a Assitência no Norte de Portugal, A Pobreza e a Assitência aos Pobres na Península Ibérica durante a Idade Média (in Portuguese), vol. I, Lisbon, Portugal, pp. 39–57
- Guia de Portugal. IV Entre Douro e Minho. II. Minho (in Portuguese), Lisbon, Portugal, 1986, p. 880
- Património Arquitectónico e Arqueológico Classificado, Inventário (in Portuguese), vol. II, Lisbon, Portugal: Distrito de Braga, 1993, p. 8
