= São Simão de Gouveia =

- Civil parish
- Location in Portugal
- Coordinates: 41.217°N 8.062°W
- Country: Portugal
- Region: Norte
- Intermunic. comm.: Tâmega e Sousa
- District: Porto
- Municipality: Amarante

Area
  - Total: 12.49 km^{2} (4.82 sq mi)

Population (2011)
  - Total: 633
  - Density: 51/km^{2} (130/sq mi)
- Time zone: UTC+00:00 (WET)
  - Summer (DST): UTC+01:00 (WEST)

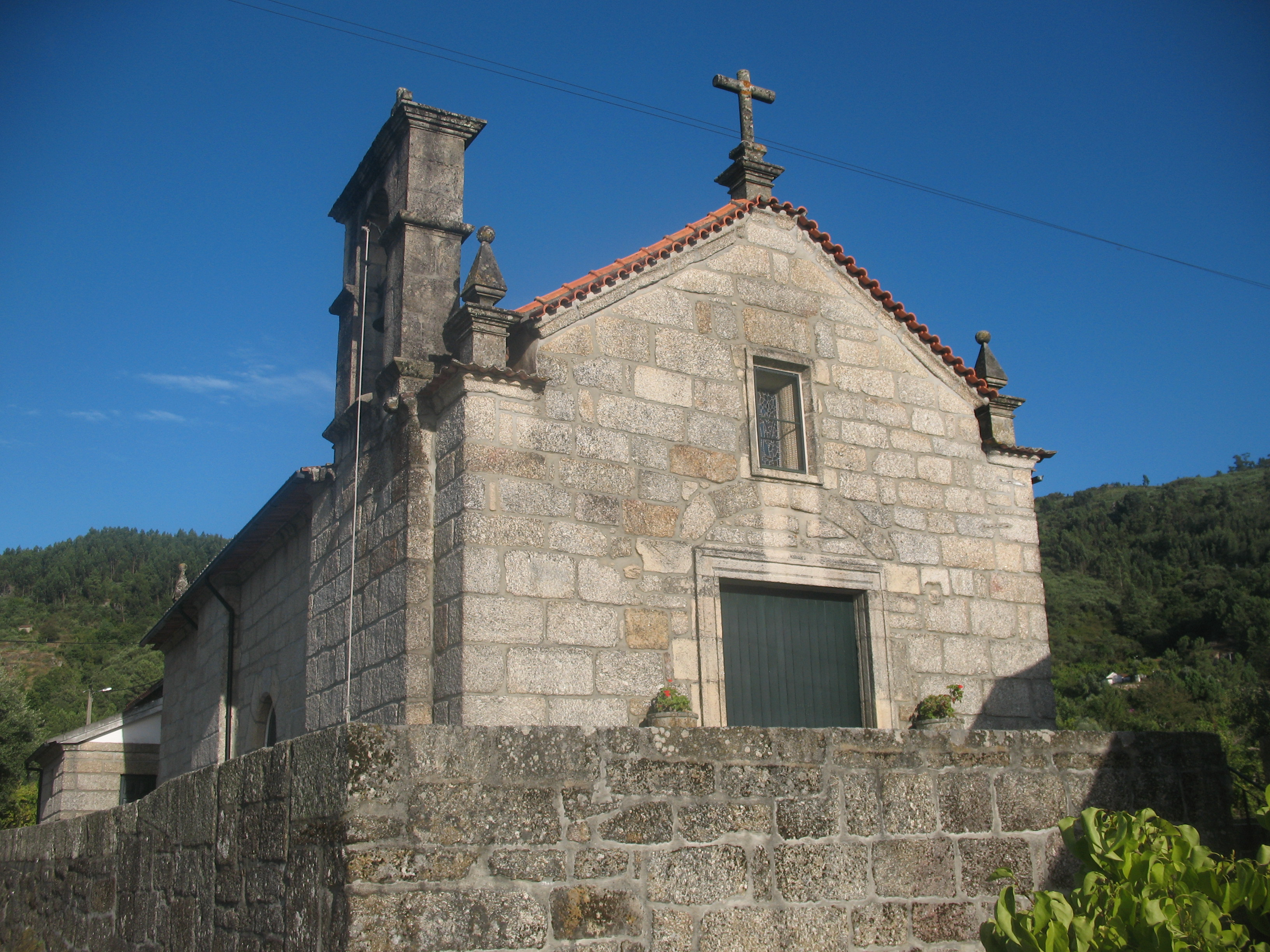

São Simão de Gouveia, or simply São Simão, is a parish (freguesia) in the municipality of Amarante in Portugal. The population in 2011 was 633, in an area of 12.49 km^{2}.

Situated in the extreme south of the municipality, São Simão is bordered to the south by the municipalities of Marco de Canaveses and Baião, to the west by Carvalho de Rei, to the north by Lomba and Jazente, and to the east by Salvador do Monte.

São Simão was a town and the center of a municipality until the early 19th century. This municipality was constituted by the following parishes: Aliviada, Cepelos, Folhada, Gouveia, Lomba, Monte (São Salvador) and Várzea. It had, in 1801, a population of 3 015.
