= Abrigada e Cabanas de Torres =

- Civil parish
- Location in Portugal
- Coordinates: 39.144°N 9.018°W
- Country: Portugal
- Region: Oeste e Vale do Tejo
- Intermunic. comm.: Oeste
- District: Lisbon
- Municipality: Alenquer

Area
  - Total: 46.15 km^{2} (17.82 sq mi)

Population (2011)
  - Total: 4,309
  - Density: 93/km^{2} (240/sq mi)
- Time zone: UTC+00:00 (WET)
  - Summer (DST): UTC+01:00 (WEST)

Abrigada e Cabanas de Torres is a civil parish in the municipality of Alenquer, Portugal. It was formed in 2013 by the merger of the former parishes Abrigada and Cabanas de Torres. The population in 2011 was 4,309, in an area of 46.15 km^{2}.
