= Fuentes (surname) =

Fuentes is a Spanish language surname meaning "fountains".

== Notable people with the surname ==
- Adrián Fuentes (born 1996), Spanish football (soccer) player
- Adriana Fuentes Cortés (born 1968), Mexican politician of the National Action Party (PAN)
- Adriana Fuentes Téllez (born 1964), Mexican politician of the Institutional Revolutionary Party (PRI)
- Agustin Fuentes (born 1966), American primatologist
- Alberto Fuentes Mohr (1927–1979), Guatemalan economist and politician
- Alejandra Fuentes (born 1980), Venezuelan diver
- Alejandro Jano Fuentes (1972–2019), Mexican singer
- Alejandro Javiero Fuentes (born 1999), Norwegian singer born in Chile
- Alfredo Felipe Fuentes (1949–2025), Cuban journalist and activist
- Amado Carrillo Fuentes (1956–1997), Mexican drug lord
- Amalia Fuentes (1940–2019), Filipina actress
- Amarilis Fuentes (1894–1955), Ecuadorian teacher and suffragist
- Andrea Fuentes (born 1983), Spanish synchronised swimmer, sister of Tina Fuentes
- Ángel Fuentes (born 1996), Spanish road cyclist
- Angel Fuentes (born 1961), Puerto Rican American politician of the Democratic Party
- Brian Fuentes (born 1975), American pro baseball player
- Carlos Fuentes (1928–2012), Mexican writer
- Carmen Fuentes (born 1965), Spanish long-distance runner
- Cynthia de las Fuentes (born 1964), American counseling psychologist
- Daisy Fuentes (born 1966), Cuban-American model, actress, and television show hostess
- Daisy Avance Fuentes (born 1957), Filipino politician
- Didier Fuentes (born 2005), Colombian baseball player
- Eduardo Sánchez de Fuentes (1874–1944), Cuban composer and folk music historian
- Erasmo Fuentes (born 1943), Mexican-born sculptor
- Eufemiano Fuentes (born 1945) Spanish sports doctor
- Eugenio Fuentes (born 1958), Spanish novelist
- Fabricio Fuentes (born 1976), Argentine football (soccer) player
- Gregorio Fuentes, (1897-2002) Spanish-Cuban, who is credited by some as a model for Ernest Hemingway's protagonist, Santiago, in The Old Man and the Sea
- Gustavo Fuentes (born 1973), Argentine football (soccer) player
- Heidemarie Fuentes, American actress and producer
- Hernán Fuentes (1918–1999), Chilean modern pentathlete
- Humberto Fuentes (born 1961), Venezuelan weightlifter
- Ivette Fuentes (born 1972), Mexican theoretical physicist
- Jesús Fuentes Lázaro (1946–2026), Spanish politician
- José Fuentes (judoka) (born 1960), Puerto Rican judoka
- José Francisco Fuentes (c. 1966–2009), Mexican politician
- José Luis Fuentes (born 1985), Venezuelan male artistic gymnast
- Josh Fuentes (born 1993), American baseball player
- Jovita Fuentes (1895–1978), Filipina soprano singer
- Juan Francisco Fuentes (born 1955), Spanish historian
- Julio Fuentes (pentathlete) (born 1960), Chilean modern pentathlete
- Julio Fuentes Serrano (1954–2001), Spanish journalist
- Julio M. Fuentes (born 1946), Puerto Rican Senior United States federal judge
- Katty Fuentes (born c. 1976), Mexican beauty queen
- Luis Fuentes (wrestler) (born 1946), Guatemalan wrestler
- Luisa Fuentes (1948–2025), Peruvian Olympic volleyball player
- Lupe Fuentes (born 1987), Colombian music producer, DJ, and former pornographic actress
- Marcos Fuentes (born 1973), Mexican football (soccer) player and manager
- Mariola Fuentes (born 1970), Spanish actress
- Mercedes Fuentes (born 1958), Spanish handball player
- Miguel Fuentes (1946–1970), major-league pitcher
- Miguel Ángel Fuentes (born 1964), Spanish football (soccer) player
- Miguel de Jesús Fuentes (born 1971), Mexican football (soccer) goalkeeper
- Mike Fuentes (baseball) (born 1958), American baseball player
- Mike Fuentes (musician) (born 1984), American musician, drummer for band Pierce The Veil
- Miren Ortubay Fuentes (born 1958), Spanish lawyer, criminologist, professor
- Moisés Fuentes (born 1985), Mexican professional boxer
- Nelson Fuentes (born 1978), Salvadoran economist and politician
- Nick Fuentes (born 1998), American political commentator
- Nicolás Fuentes (1941–2015), Peruvian football (soccer) player
- Nina Fuentes (born 1968), Venezuelan artist, art collector, curator, and art dealer
- Orlando Fuentes (born 1974), American judoka
- Don Pedro Enríquez de Acevedo, Count of Fuentes, Spanish governor of Milan
- Pedro Fuentes (born 1957), Cuban weightlifter
- Reymond Fuentes (born 1991), Puerto Rican baseball player
- Rosa Fuentes (born 1965), Mexican freestyle swimmer
- Rubén Fuentes (1926–2022), Mexican violinist & composer
- Sammy Fuentes (born 1964), Puerto Rican boxer
- Sebastián Fuentes (born 1987), Uruguayan football (soccer) player
- Susan Fuentes (1954–2013), Filipina singer
- Thomas Fuentes, former Assistant Director of the FBI
- Tina Fuentes (artist) (born 1949), American painter
- Tito Fuentes (born 1944), Cuban-American pro baseball player
- Tom Fuentes (1948–2012), American politician of the Republican Party
- Fernando de Fuentes (1894–1958), Mexican film director, considered a pioneer in the film industry worldwide
- Vic Fuentes (born 1983), American musician, singer for band Pierce The Veil
- Zetna Fuentes (fl. 1996–present), American television director

== Fictional characters ==
- Isabel Fuentes, Mexican-American character portrayed by Mexican-American actress Salma Hayek in the movie Fools Rush In
- Marisol Fuentes, Mexican-American character portrayed by American actress Cree Cicchino in the Netflix series Mr. Iglesias

== See also ==
- Fontes (surname), Portuguese variant
