= Feteira (Angra do Heroísmo) =

- Civil parish
- Location in the Azores Feteira (Terceira)
- Coordinates: 38°39′16″N 27°9′4″W
- Country: Portugal
- Auton. region: Azores
- Island: Terceira
- Municipality: Angra do Heroísmo

Area
  - Total: 5.25 km^{2} (2.03 sq mi)
- Elevation: 162 m (531 ft)

Population (2011)
  - Total: 1,239
  - Density: 236/km^{2} (611/sq mi)
- Time zone: UTC−01:00 (AZOT)
  - Summer (DST): UTC+00:00 (AZOST)
- Postal code: 9700-356
- Area code: 292
- Patron: Nossa Senhora da Consolação
- Website: freguesiafeteira.com

Feteira (pronounced [fɨ.ˈtɐj.ɾɐ]) is a rural civil parish in the municipality of Angra do Heroísmo in the Portuguese archipelago of the Azores. The population in 2011 was 1,239, in an area of 5.25 square kilometres (2.03 mi^{2}).

== History ==
During the settlement of the island (between the 15th and 16th century), the region of Feteiras was a frontier area, between various jurisdictions, including captaincies and municipalities. The first settlement was the ecclesiastical parish of Santa Ana da Porta Alegre, created by the first colonists to venture east of Pico da D. Joana, and later, when that settlement lost its influence, it was absorbed into the parish of Vila de São Sebastião. With the restructuring of parishes and municipalities, that resulted in a densification of settlements during the first half of the 16th century, the region was integrated into the parish of São Pedro da Ribeirinha, until it became an independent parish on 30 November 1906.

During the captaincy period, delimited in 1474 between Angra and Praia, the southern coast was fixed at the old geodesic mark, that followed the eastern edge of the volcanic tailings in Feteira. That way, the limit coincided with the parish of Ribeirinha (until 1906) and the territory was part of Angra. Many of the references to Marco refers to the diverse points in the parish, that marked and demarcated the captaincy's boundaries. This situation changed in 1565, when experienced geographers through a 1565 accord of the Tribunal da Relação da Corte (who had long opposed the Donatary-Captains Antão Martins and Manuel Corte-Real), advanced the boundary 1 kilometre (1,000 m) to the west, to follow the actual Canada do Marco. The final demarcation was concluded on 8 July 1565, and put an end to quarrels that had been raging since 1525, over the limits of Altares. By consequence, the eastern edge of the parish, between Canada dos Clérigos and Canada do Marco, that included the Ponta Nova bridge, became the responsibility of the Captaincy of Praia, while the eastern frontier, from Canada do Marco until Ladeira Grande, became part of the captaincy of Angra. Yet, this decision was not peaceful, and required the intervention of the Crown, who established a geodesic mark along Canada do Marco.

The parish of Ribeirinha was part of the city of Angra, and by extension, a curato of the parish of São Sebastião. By 1568, the parish of São Pedro da Ribeirinha was already created, and included the territory of Feteira. In this context, when they structured the municipalities of Terceira, the limit of Ribeirinha, which extended to the edge of the volcanic fields of Feteira, began to be the border between Angra and São Sebastião. The area east of the volcanic fields, between Canada do Marco and the parish limits, was part of the region of Porto Judeu (and by extension the municipality of Vila de São Sebastião). This explains the successive changes east of the parish, that occurred between 1911 and 1928.

Located on the peripheral area, with little potable water, the settlement was late in developing and, then, slow to grow. The original settlement developed from the small nuclei that sprang around the Hermitage of Nossa Senhora das Mercês, a small temple constructed at the top of Caminho das Vinhas. Yet, at the beginning of the 18th century, two centuries and a half after its settlement, only included six permanent residences. That hermitage, which maintained its architectural design, was constructed in 1590, through the initiative of Father Manuel Martins Coelho Baião, then vicar of the parish of Ribeirinha, whose territory included Feteira. The locality included few residents, and the priest constructed the hermitage at his own expense, to celebrated mass during the period of grape cultivation and winemaking, and included an improvised building so that the priest could overnight during the harvest. The selection of the invocation, to Our Lady of Mercy, originated in Spain, and was popularized by the monks of the Order of Our Lady of Mercy, founded by São Pedro Nolasco. The image was considered a protector of captive Christians in North Africa, and specifically to those captured by Saracen raiders. The invocation was also a patron of various brotherhoods, formed by slaves, who considered the image as vestige of liberation.

Without any consistent source of potable water, the area continued to be sparsely populated until the beginning of the 19th century, when the expansion of cistern construction, growth in the winemaking industry and the opening of the Royal Roadway facilities the settlement of families and the place began to take on a life of its own. At this time, the hermitage, which became the property of the Toste Parreira family, became the centre of village life and embryo for the parish of Feteira.

On 10 September 1863 Feteira was elevated to the status of suffrage of the parish of São Pedro da Ribeirinha, transforming the small hermitage into local cult. At the time there were 300 permanent inhabitants. It first cura was Father Domingos Correia de Ávila. The hermitage, which was owned by Inácio Toste Parreira, was too small install the Holy Sacrament, meaning the parish of Ribeirinha still retained its importance. As a consequence, after its elevation, there was an upswell of interest in constructing a new church of adequate dimensions, therein the intention to expand the hermitage. Yet, the property owner opposed the idea, and did not cede any land for its construction. Following his obstruction, the townsfolk decided to construct the new temple along the Royal Road linking Angra and Vila de São Sebastião, along the Caminho das Vinhas (today Canada das Mercês).

As a consequence of this decision, the new Church of Nossa Senhora da Consolação was inaugurated in 1868, and the hermitage began to be the responsibility of its property owners. The change in patron came from Inácio Toste Parreira, who did not permit the transference of the image of Our Lady of Mercy to the new church. At the time of its inauguration, therefore, Maria Luísa Guedes Sampaio (widow of Diogo Labatt) donated the image of Our Lady of Consolation. Consequently, the church obtain its patron, while the ecclesiastical parish retained the Nossa Senhora das Mercês, since the Vatican did not authorize the change. The Church of Nossa Senhora da Consolação was officially inaugurated on 20 May 1968, but had to be repaired after damage from the 1980 earthquake.

There were approximately 403 homes in 1991.

== Geography ==
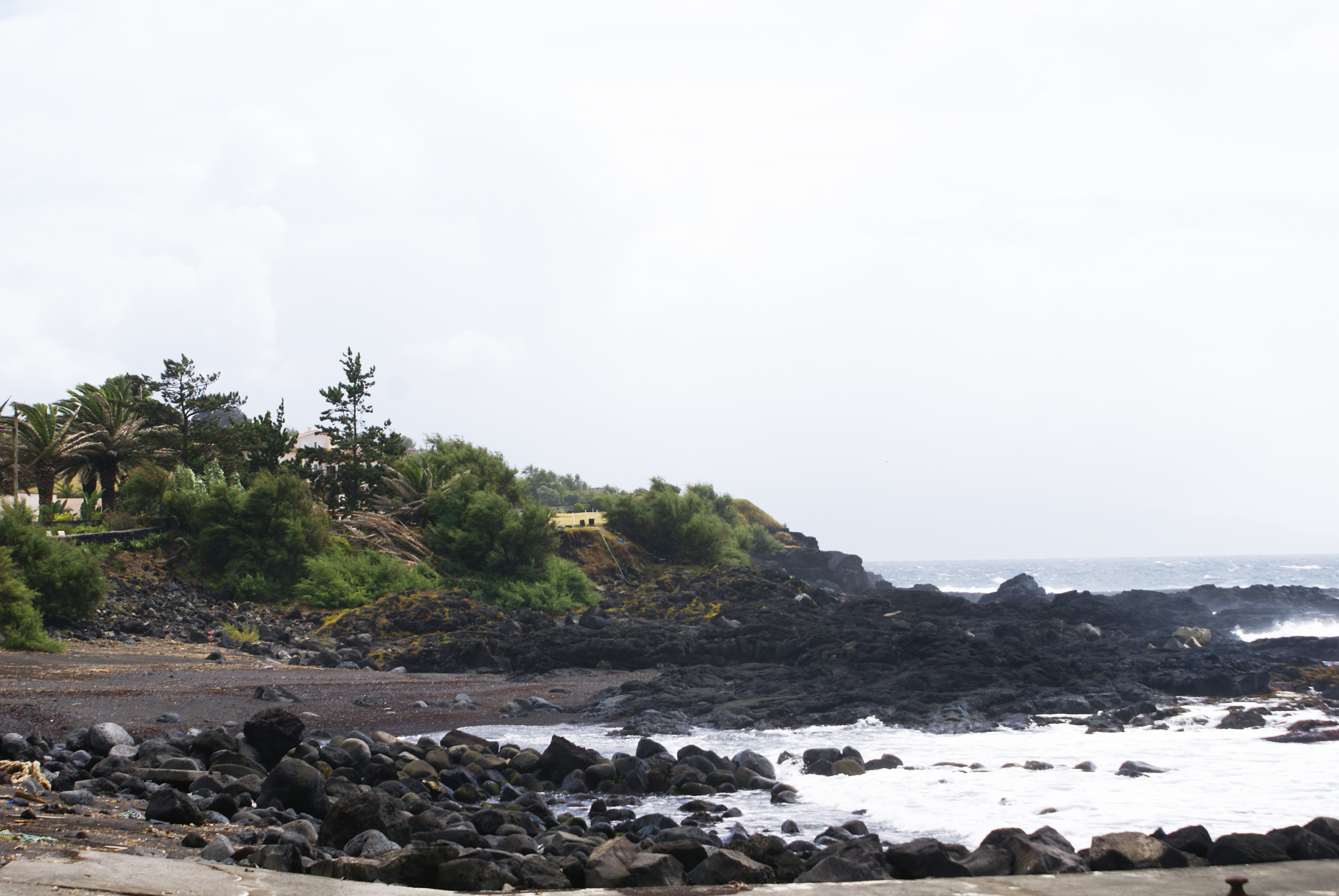
A view of the southern border of Feteria at the beach of the same name

The rural parish is located 7 kilometres (4.3 mi) from the municipal seat of Angra do Heroísmo. The geographic limits of the parish include the parish of Porto Judeu (to the east), Ribeirinha (to the north and west), while it fronts the Atlantic Ocean (to the south). It contains the localities Fajã da Lajinha, Feteira, Nossa Senhora da Esperança, Nossa Senhora dos Mercês, Outeiro and Serretinha.

Although the population has decreased, current statistics indicate a leveling of out-migration.

== Architecture ==
The traditional architecture of Doze Ribeiras resembles much of the rural homes of the western Terceira region, generally constructed around a single floor, many white-washed homes, bordered by multi-coloured trim at the corners, doors and windows.

- Hermitage of Nossa Senhora das Mercês (Portuguese: Capela de Nossa Senhora das Mercês/Ermida de Nossa Senhora das Mercês)
- Church of Nossa Senhora das Mercês (Portuguese: Igreja Paroquial de Feteira/Igreja de Nossa Senhora das Mercês)
- Império of the Holy Spirit of Ponta Nova do Parada Portuguese: Império do Espírito Santo da Ponta Nova do Parada)
- Império of the Holy Spirit of Canada dos Vinhais Portuguese: Império do Espírito Santo das Mercês/Império da Canada das Vinhas
