= Fontes =

Fontes can refer to:

== Places ==
=== France ===
- Fontès, a commune in the Hérault department

=== Portugal ===
- Fontes (Abrantes), a civil parish in the municipality of Abrantes
- Fontes (Santa Marta de Penaguião), a civil parish in the municipality of Santa Marta de Penaguião

== Literature ==
- Fontes Christiani, a bilingual collection of patristic and medieval Latin works with modern German translations

== Other ==
- Fontes (surname), a Portuguese-language surname
