= Charneca de Caparica e Sobreda =

- Civil parish
- Location in Portugal
- Coordinates: 38.63°N 9.20°W
- Country: Portugal
- Region: Lisbon
- Metropolitan area: Lisbon
- District: Setúbal
- Municipality: Almada

Area
  - Total: 29.31 km^{2} (11.32 sq mi)

Population (2011)
  - Total: 44,929
  - Density: 1,533/km^{2} (3,970/sq mi)
- Time zone: UTC+00:00 (WET)
  - Summer (DST): UTC+01:00 (WEST)
- Website: www.jf-charnecacaparica-sobreda.pt

Charneca de Caparica e Sobreda is a civil parish in the municipality of Almada, Portugal. It was formed in 2013 by the merger of the former parishes Charneca de Caparica and Sobreda. The population in 2011 was 44,929, in an area of 29.31 km^{2}.

== History ==
It was formed in 2013, as part of a national administrative reform, by the aggregation of the former parishes of Charneca de Caparica and Sobreda, with its headquarters in Charneca de Caparica. The current president of the parish council is Pedro Matias.

Its territory includes Monte da Cruz, a hill of reference in terms of historical and religious heritage, and Herdade da Aroeira with its world-renowned pine forest (the King's Pine Forest, planted by King João V of Portugal) and golf course.
