= Ribafria e Pereiro de Palhacana =

- Civil parish
- Location in Portugal
- Coordinates: 39.062°N 9.094°W
- Country: Portugal
- Region: Oeste e Vale do Tejo
- Intermunic. comm.: Oeste
- District: Lisbon
- Municipality: Alenquer

Area
  - Total: 18.34 km^{2} (7.08 sq mi)

Population (2011)
  - Total: 1,547
  - Density: 84.35/km^{2} (218.5/sq mi)
- Time zone: UTC+00:00 (WET)
  - Summer (DST): UTC+01:00 (WEST)

Ribafria e Pereiro de Palhacana is a civil parish in the municipality of Alenquer, Portugal. It was formed in 2013 by the merger of the former parishes Ribafria and Pereiro de Palhacana. The population in 2011 was 1,547, in an area of 18.34 km².
