= Museu Municipal Amadeo de Souza-Cardoso =

Art museum in Amarante, Portugal

Coordinates: 41.2697°N 8.0785°W

Museu de Arte Moderna Amadeo de Souza-Cardoso
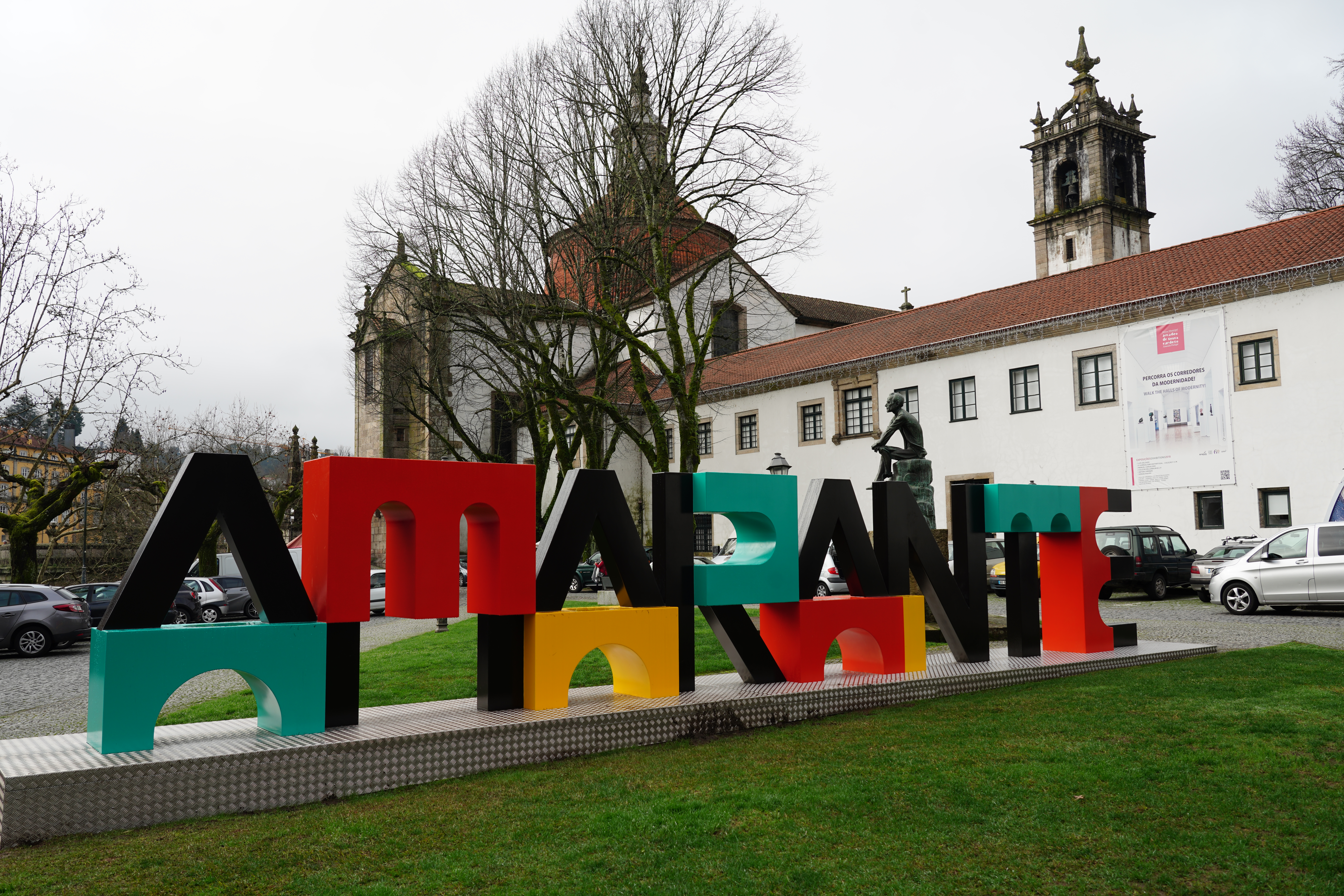
- Established: 1947
- Location: Alameda Teixeira de Pascoaes, Amarante, Portugal
- Type: Modern and contemporary art, archaeology, and ethnography
- Owner: Municipality of Amarante
- Website: www.amadeosouza-cardoso.pt

The Museu de Arte Moderna Amadeo de Souza-Cardoso ("Amadeo de Souza-Cardoso Museum of Modern Art"; formerly the Museu Municipal Amadeo de Souza-Cardoso, "Amadeo de Souza-Cardoso Municipal Museum") is an art museum in Amarante, Portugal. The museum houses collections relating to artists and writers born in Amarante, including Amadeo de Souza-Cardoso, António Carneiro, and Acácio Lino. It was founded in 1947 as the Biblioteca-Museu Municipal de Amarante ("Municipal Library-Museum of Amarante"). In the 1980s, it was relocated to the Monastery of São Gonçalo, which was adapted for use as a museum to a design by architect Alcino Soutinho. The museum and the Municipality of Amarante jointly award the Prémio Amadeo de Souza-Cardoso to Portuguese artists in three categories every two years, with the winner of the top-tier Grande Prémio being invited to hold an exhibition at the museum.

== History ==
The origins of the museum date to 1938, when a fire destroyed the cinema that occupied the former Chapter House of the Monastery of São Gonçalo. The fire prompted Lieutenant Colonel Costa Santos to propose establishing a library and museum in the space.

In 1946, Albano Sardoeira led the creation of the Grupo de Amigos da Biblioteca-Museu ("Friends of the Library-Museum"), and the institution was formally established in 1947 under the direction of a governing board.

The museum's original collections were eclectic and included:

- the municipal archives and library, including works from the former secondary school;
- the artistic estate of António Carneiro, later expanded through donations by Katherine Carneyro;
- examples of local folk iconography, including A Serpe ("The Serpent") and the Diabos de Amarante ("Devils of Amarante");
- sacred art, furniture, and a collection of local archaeological artifacts.

In 1953, the museum opened galleries dedicated to António Carneiro, António Cândido, and Amadeo de Souza-Cardoso.

The Biblioteca Municipal Albano Sardoeira and the Museu Municipal Amadeo de Souza-Cardoso became separate institutions in 1980.

From the 1990s until his death in 2021, the museum was directed by Portuguese art historian, painter and university professor António Cardoso (1932–2021). During his directorship, Cardoso was responsible for the publication of the museum's first collection catalogue, issued in 1997. His work contributed to the development and documentation of the museum's collections.
