= Cerdeira =

Cerdeira is a surname. Notable people with the surname include:

- Carmen Cerdeira (1958–2007), Spanish politician
- Clemente Cerdeira Fernández (1887–1947), Spanish diplomat
- Hilda Cerdeira (born 1942), Argentine-Brazilian physicist
- Tales Cerdeira (born 1987), Brazilian swimmer
