= Posto Santo =

- Civil parish
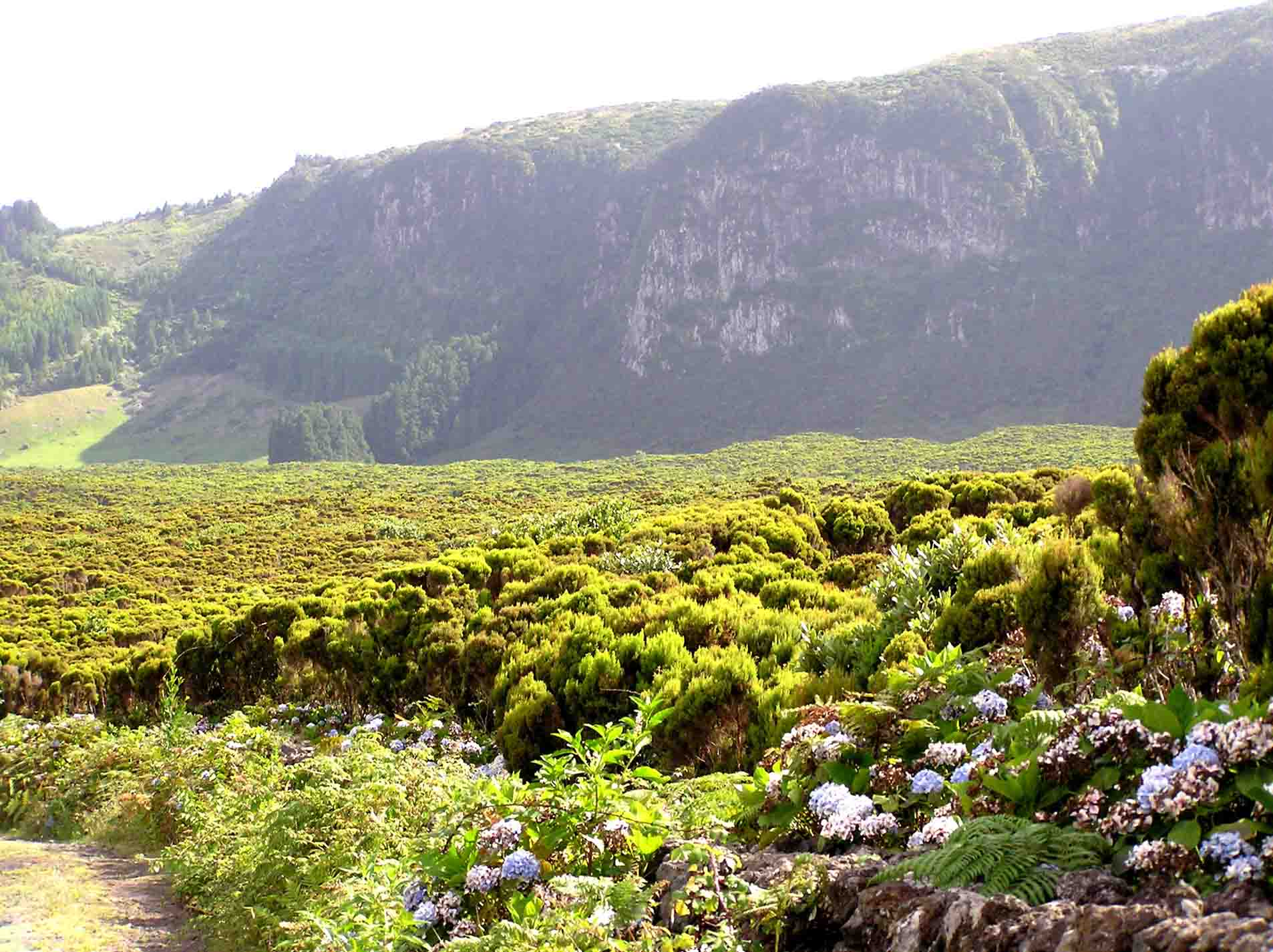
- The crater face of the Guilherme Moniz caldera, on the eastern edge of the parish's frontier

- Location in the Azores Posto Santo (Terceira)
- Coordinates: 38°40′42″N 27°13′51″W
- Country: Portugal
- Auton. region: Azores
- Island: Terceira
- Municipality: Angra do Heroísmo
- Established: Settlement: fl. 1500; Parish: fl. 1599; Civil parish: 15 September 1980

Area
  - Total: 20.37 km^{2} (7.86 sq mi)
- Elevation: 211 m (692 ft)

Population (2011)
  - Total: 1,048
  - Density: 51.45/km^{2} (133.3/sq mi)
- Time zone: UTC−01:00 (AZOT)
  - Summer (DST): UTC+00:00 (AZOST)
- Postal code: 9700-238
- Area code: (+351) 292 XXX-XXXX
- Website: www.jfpostosanto.pt

Posto Santo (pronounced [ˈpoʃ.tu ˈsɐ̃.tu]) is a parish in the municipality of Angra do Heroísmo on the island of Terceira in the Azores. The population in 2011 was 1,048, in an area of 20.37 km^{2}. Posto Santo was elevated to parish status on 15 September 1980. It was previously part of the parish of Santa Luzia. The parish is relatively far from the ocean, and it lies at an elevation of forty-five metres. Its predominant economic activity is agriculture. It contains the localities Espigão, Grota do Medo, Lapinha, Piquinho and Posto Santo.

== History ==
The name, "Posto Santo", is literally translated as "holy post", its origin developed from an outbreak of bubonic plague in 1599 that killed thousands on the island of Terceira. The parish of Posto Santo was spared and served as a refuge for many of the residents of Angra do Heroísmo. Since then, it has been known as Posto Santo.

Posto Santo should not be confused with Porto Santo which is an island close to Madeira Island.
