= Abrigada =

- Civil parish
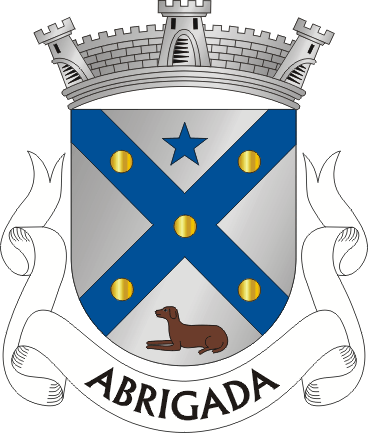
- Coat of arms

- Location in Portugal
- Coordinates: 39°08′N 9°01′W
- Country: Portugal
- Region: Oeste e Vale do Tejo
- Intermunic. comm.: Oeste
- District: Lisbon
- Municipality: Alenquer

Area
  - Total: 39.23 km^{2} (15.15 sq mi)

Population (2001)
  - Total: 3,416
  - Density: 87.08/km^{2} (225.5/sq mi)
- Time zone: UTC+00:00 (WET)
  - Summer (DST): UTC+01:00 (WEST)

Abrigada (Portuguese pronunciation: [ɐβɾiˈɣaðɐ]) is a former civil parish, located in the municipality of Alenquer, in western Portugal. In 2013, the parish merged into the new parish Abrigada e Cabanas de Torres. It covers 39.23 km^{2} in area, with 3416 inhabitants as of 2001.
