= Cértima River =

River in northern Portugal

Coordinates: 40°35′29″N 8°31′31″W

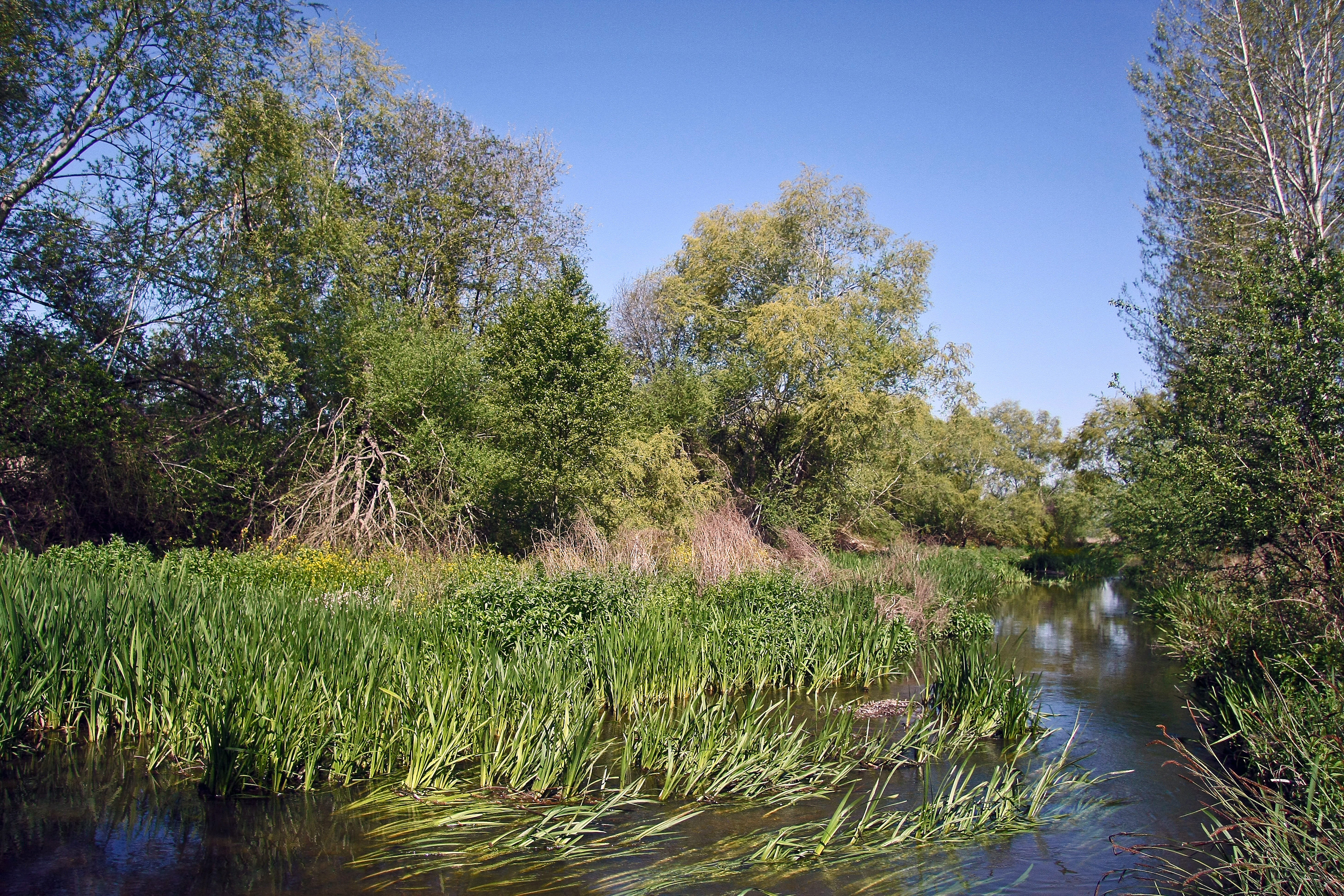
The Certima River

The Cértima River (Portuguese: Rio Cértima, Portuguese pronunciation: [ˈsɛɾtimɐ]) is a river in Portugal that runs through the freguesia of Barrô e Aguada de Baixo, in Águeda Municipality, Aveiro District.

== See also ==
- List of rivers in Portugal
