= Vilela, Seramil e Paredes Secas =

- Civil parish
- Location in Portugal
- Coordinates: 41.630°N 8.348°W
- Country: Portugal
- Region: Norte
- Intermunic. comm.: Cávado
- District: Braga
- Municipality: Amares

Area
  - Total: 8.60 km^{2} (3.32 sq mi)

Population (2011)
  - Total: 645
  - Density: 75.0/km^{2} (194/sq mi)
- Time zone: UTC+00:00 (WET)
  - Summer (DST): UTC+01:00 (WEST)

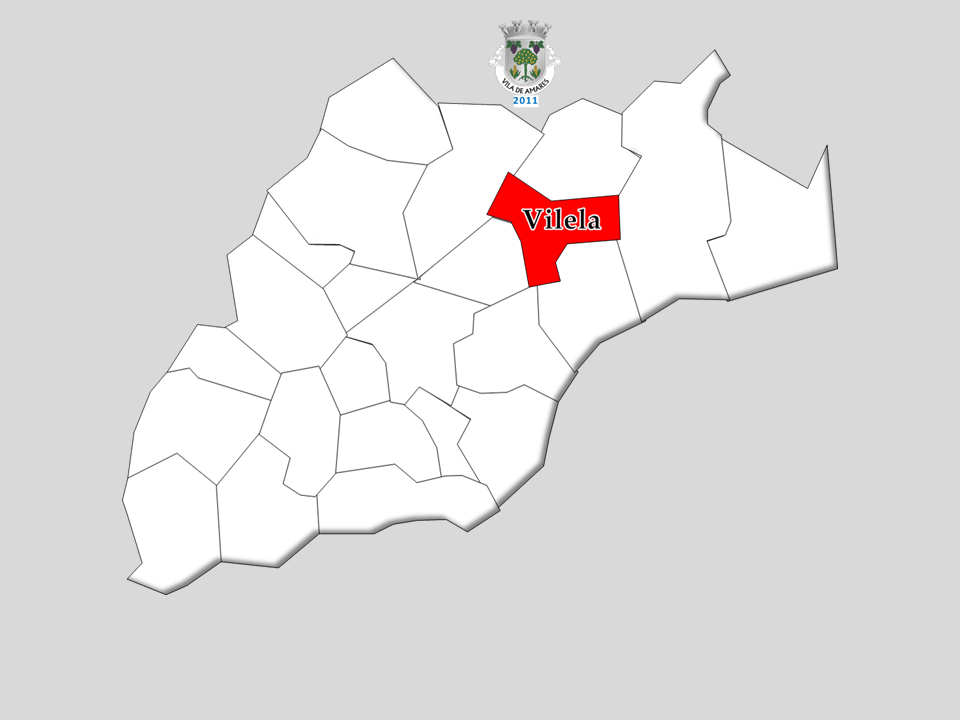
Vilela in Amares

Vilela, Seramil e Paredes Secas is a civil parish in the municipality of Amares, Braga District, Portugal. It was formed in 2013 by the merger of the former parishes Vilela, Seramil and Paredes Secas. The population in 2011 was 645, in an area of 8.60 km^{2} (3.32 sq mi).
