= São Facundo e Vale das Mós =

Civil parish in Portugal

- Civil parish
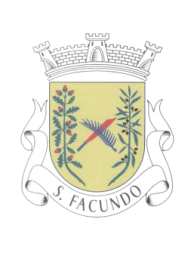
- Coat of arms

- Location in Portugal
- Coordinates: 39.37°N 8.10°W
- Country: Portugal
- Region: Oeste e Vale do Tejo
- Intermunic. comm.: Médio Tejo
- District: Santarém
- Municipality: Abrantes

Area
  - Total: 104.91 km^{2} (40.51 sq mi)

Population (2011)
  - Total: 1,515
  - Density: 14.44/km^{2} (37.40/sq mi)
- Time zone: UTC+00:00 (WET)
  - Summer (DST): UTC+01:00 (WEST)

São Facundo e Vale das Mós is a freguesia ("civil parish") in the municipality of Abrantes, Portugal. It was formed in 2013 by the merger of the former parishes São Facundo and Vale das Mós. The population in 2011 was 1,515, in an area of 104.91 km^{2} (40.51 sq mi).
