= Bugalhos =

- Civil parish
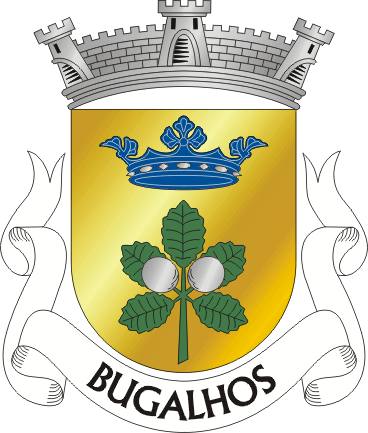
- Coat of arms

- Location in Portugal
- Coordinates: 39.446389°N 8.646389°W
- Country: Portugal
- Region: Centro
- District: Santarém
- Municipality: Barreiro

Area
  - Total: 16.46 km^{2} (6.36 sq mi)

Population (2011)
  - Total: 1,084
  - Density: 65.86/km^{2} (170.6/sq mi)
- Time zone: UTC+00:00 (WET)
  - Summer (DST): UTC+01:00 (WEST)
- Postal code: 2380
- Website: freguesia-bugalhos.net

Bugalhos is a civil parish in the municipality of Alcanena, Portugal. The population in 2011 was 1,084.
