= Cabanas de Torres =

- Civil parish
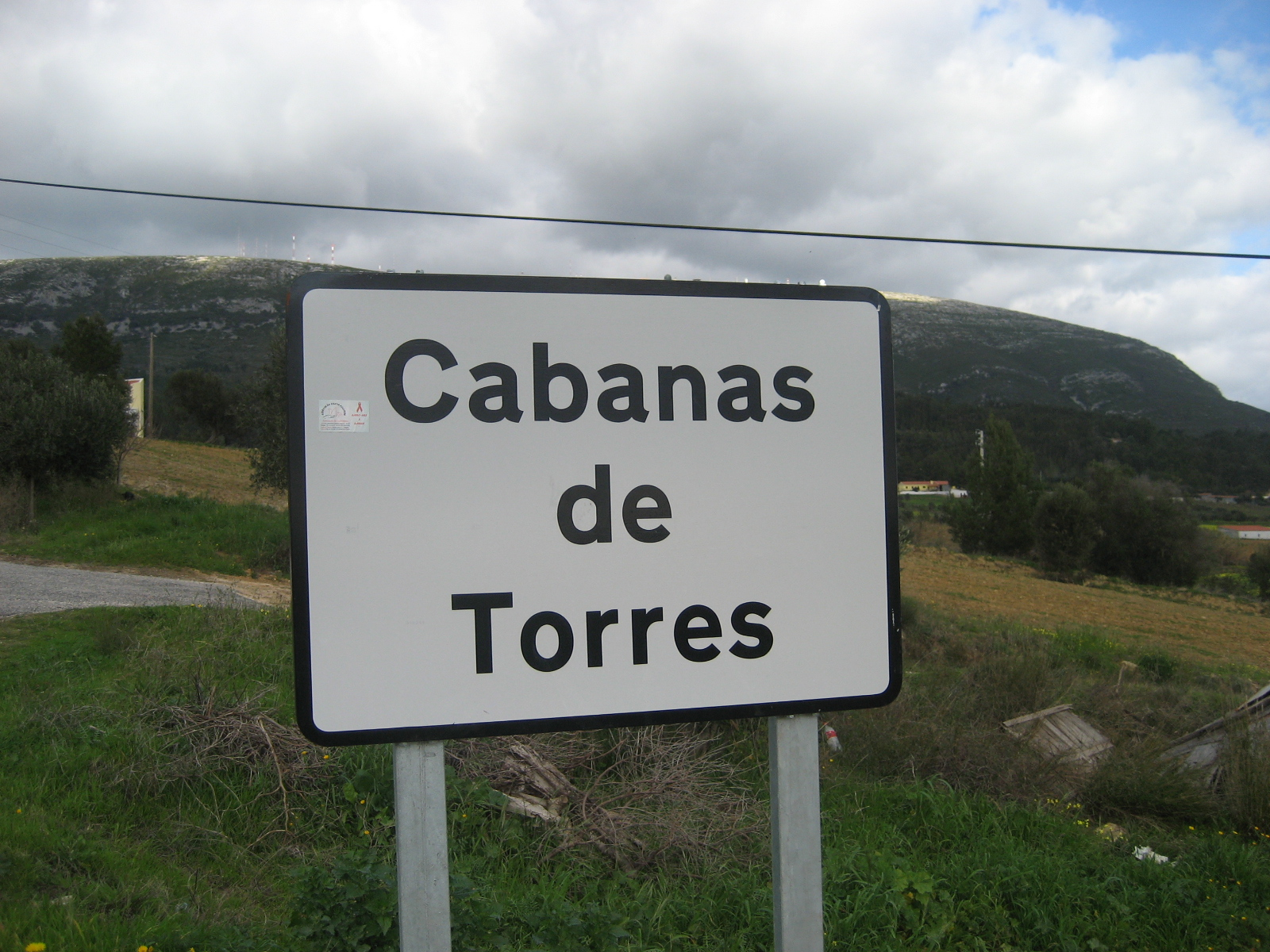

- Location in Portugal
- Coordinates: 39°09′N 9°03′W
- Country: Portugal
- Region: Oeste e Vale do Tejo
- Intermunic. comm.: Oeste
- District: Lisbon
- Municipality: Alenquer

Area
  - Total: 6.19 km^{2} (2.39 sq mi)

Population (2001)
  - Total: 1,018
  - Density: 164/km^{2} (426/sq mi)
- Time zone: UTC+00:00 (WET)
  - Summer (DST): UTC+01:00 (WEST)

Cabanas de Torres (Portuguese pronunciation: [kɐˈβɐnɐʒ ðɨ ˈtoʁɨʃ]) is a former civil parish, located in the municipality of Alenquer, in western Portugal. In 2013, the parish merged into the new parish Abrigada e Cabanas de Torres. It covers 6.19 km^{2} in area, with 1018 inhabitants as of 2001.
