= Nariz =

Former civil parish in Portugal

- Civil parish
- Location in Portugal
- Coordinates: 40°32′55.66″N 8°35′25.52″W
- Country: Portugal
- Region: Centro
- Intermunic. comm.: Região de Aveiro
- District: Aveiro
- Municipality: Aveiro
- Established: Parish: c. January 1819; Civil parish: 1 January 1936

Area
  - Total: 9.32 km^{2} (3.60 sq mi)
- Elevation: 27 m (89 ft)

Population (2001)
  - Total: 1,467
  - Density: 160/km^{2} (410/sq mi)
- Time zone: UTC+00:00 (WET)
  - Summer (DST): UTC+01:00 (WEST)
- Postal code: 3810-589
- Area code: 234
- Patron: São Pedro

Nariz is a former civil parish located in the municipality of Aveiro, in western Portugal. In 2013, the parish merged into the new parish Requeixo, Nossa Senhora de Fátima e Nariz. It was named for São Pedro de Náris. With an area of 9.32 square kilometres (3.60 sq mi), it is made of localities of Nariz, Verba and Vessada. Its population was 1,467 in 2001.

== History ==
The existence of a settlement in Nariz was first referred to in the population cadastre (Portuguese: Cadastro da População) ordered by Manuel I of Portugal in 1521 (completed in 1527). At the time the region was already part of the municipality of Aveiro.

The origin of its name remains clouded in mystery, although it could have been a colloquial term of derision, to indicate a rural backwater. In the 13th century, it was also likely to have been designated as Amalarici ("town"), which presupposes its translation to Mariz or Maariz, later adopting the form commonly used today.

On 3 October 1775, Father Manuel do Vale, prior of Requeixo, responding to an inquiry on 22 September, referred to the ecclesiastical parish that existed, encompassing the places of Requeixo, Narix and Póvoa, which were supported by individual financial clerks and clergy (the co-adjuster for Nariz was Father Francisco Rodriques Álvares, from Recardães). This branch of the parish of Requeixo included a small population of 164 dwellings dispersed in the hamlets of Nariz, Cabeço da Eireira, Canissais, Porto de Ilhavo, Verba, Vessada and Ramalheiro.

The archive at the University of Coimbra holds a document dated 7 March 1811, that was presented by the local brotherhood of São Pedro and villagers from Nariz, requesting the authority to have the blessed sacrament in the sacristy of the local chapel during Lent.

The parish of São Pedro de Nariz was created by the Bishop of Aveiro, D. Manuel Pacheco de Resende, in January 1819, de-annexing it from Requeixo. Its first parish priest was Father Pedro Duarte Rosa, until 31 December 1829, succeeded by Father João Simões, who remained chaplain until 1808. He was succeeded by Father Jerónimo Vieira de Carvalho, who was born in Nariz in 1781, and was vicar from April 1839 to January 1848, dying on 24 October 1866. At the time of its incorporation the area included 200 dwellings and more than 700 inhabitants. Its urban size hovered around this size in 1867 (215), 1896 (218), slowly creeping upwards in 1909 (226 dwellings with 958 inhabitants) and 1941 (372 dwellings with 1199 inhabitants). The Church of São Pedro was constructed from the small oratory that existed on the same site, developed over time, although the first baptism on the site occurred on 27 March 1819.

== Geography ==
The territory of Nariz is located in the southern extremity of the municipality of Aveiro, between the neighbouring municipalities of Vagos and Oliveira do Bairro.

== Architecture ==
The Instituto de Gestão do Património Arquitectónico e Arqueológico (IGESPAR) has classified the historical main Church of Nariz/Church of São Pedro as a site of public interest, owing to its history as the centre of worship and communal life. This church, originally built on a smaller chapel to the patron saint, was ordered constructed by Father João Simões in 1808.

== Culture ==
The parish's main celebration is in honour of Nossa Senhora do Rosário, which is celebrated on the first Sunday of August.
