= Hilda Cerdeira =

Argentine mathematical physicist

Hilda Alicia Gómez de Cerdeira (born 1942) is an Argentine mathematical physicist whose research concerns nonlinear systems and the synchronization of chaos. She is a retired professor at the Institute of Theoretical Physics of São Paulo State University in Brazil.

== Education and career ==
Cerdeira earned a licenciada in physics from the University of Buenos Aires in 1966, and completed a Ph.D. in physics at Brown University in 1972. Her dissertation, High frequency transport coefficients of a clean type II superconductor near the upper critical field, was supervised by Anthony Houghton.

After postdoctoral research at the Max Planck Institute for Solid State Research and Max Planck Institute for Metals Research in Stuttgart, Germany, she took a faculty position in 1974 at the University of Campinas in Brazil. She left Campinas in 1988 to become a researcher at the International Centre for Theoretical Physics in Italy and then the Max Planck Institute for the Physics of Complex Systems in Germany, before returning to Brazil in 2006 as an invited professor at São Paulo State University.

== Recognition ==
In 2006, Cerdeira was named a Fellow of the American Physical Society (APS), after a nomination from the APS Forum on International Physics, "for her contributions in superconductivity, nonlinear dynamics and synchronization of chaotic systems and her development and management of outreach programs in communications and literature for colleagues in developing countries".
