= Pereiro de Palhacana =

- Civil parish
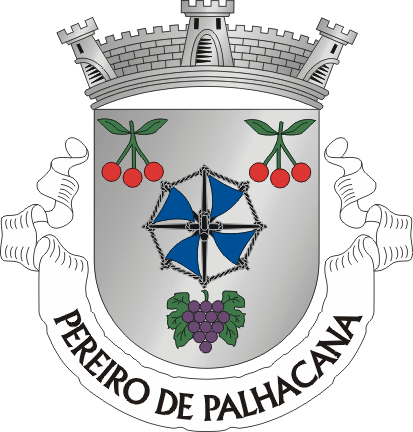
- Coat of arms

- Location in Portugal
- Coordinates: 39°02′N 9°06′W
- Country: Portugal
- Region: Oeste e Vale do Tejo
- Intermunic. comm.: Oeste
- District: Lisbon
- Municipality: Alenquer

Area
  - Total: 9.12 km^{2} (3.52 sq mi)

Population (2001)
  - Total: 591
  - Density: 65/km^{2} (170/sq mi)
- Time zone: UTC+00:00 (WET)
  - Summer (DST): UTC+01:00 (WEST)

Pereiro de Palhacana (Portuguese pronunciation: [pɨˈɾɐjɾu ðɨ pɐʎɐˈkɐnɐ]) is a former civil parish, located in the municipality of Alenquer, in western Portugal. In 2013, the parish merged into the new parish Ribafria e Pereiro de Palhacana. It covers 9.12 km^{2} (3.52 sq mi) in area, with 591 inhabitants as of 2001.
