= Sobreda =

- Civil parish
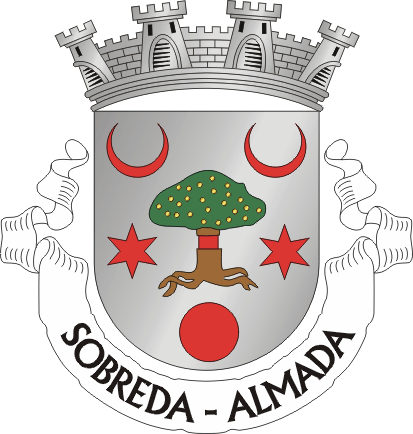
- Coat of arms

- Location in Portugal
- Coordinates: 38.648°N 9.185°W
- Country: Portugal
- Region: Lisbon
- Metropolitan area: Lisbon
- District: Setúbal
- Municipality: Almada
- Disbanded: 2013

Area
  - Total: 6.16 km^{2} (2.38 sq mi)

Population (2011)
  - Total: 15,166
  - Density: 2,500/km^{2} (6,400/sq mi)
- Time zone: UTC+00:00 (WET)
  - Summer (DST): UTC+01:00 (WEST)

Sobreda is a former civil parish in the municipality of Almada, Lisbon metropolitan area, Portugal. In 2013, the parish merged into the new parish Charneca de Caparica e Sobreda. The population in 2011 was 15,166, in an area of 6.16 km^{2}.
