= Eixo e Eirol =

Civil parish in Portugal

- Civil parish
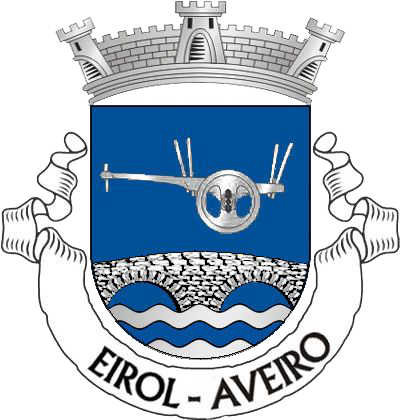
- Coat of arms

- Location in Portugal
- Coordinates: 40.628°N 8.561°W
- Country: Portugal
- Region: Centro
- Intermunic. comm.: Região de Aveiro
- District: Aveiro
- Municipality: Aveiro

Area
  - Total: 22.42 km^{2} (8.66 sq mi)

Population (2011)
  - Total: 6,324
  - Density: 280/km^{2} (730/sq mi)
- Time zone: UTC+00:00 (WET)
  - Summer (DST): UTC+01:00 (WEST)

Eixo e Eirol is a civil parish in the municipality of Aveiro, Portugal. It was formed in 2013 by the merger of the former parishes Eixo and Eirol. The population in 2011 was 6,324, in an area of 22.42 km^{2}.
