= Ferreiros (Amares) =

- Civil parish
- Location in Portugal
- Coordinates: 41.629°N 8.364°W
- Country: Portugal
- Region: Norte
- Intermunic. comm.: Cávado
- District: Braga
- Municipality: Amares
- Established: Settlement: 16th century Parish: 1514
- Disbanded: 2013

Area
  - Total: 2.65 km^{2} (1.02 sq mi)

Population (2011)
  - Total: 3,212
  - Density: 1,210/km^{2} (3,140/sq mi)
- Time zone: UTC+00:00 (WET)
  - Summer (DST): UTC+01:00 (WEST)
- Postal code: 4720-341
- Area code: 253
- Patron: Nossa Senhora da Expectação

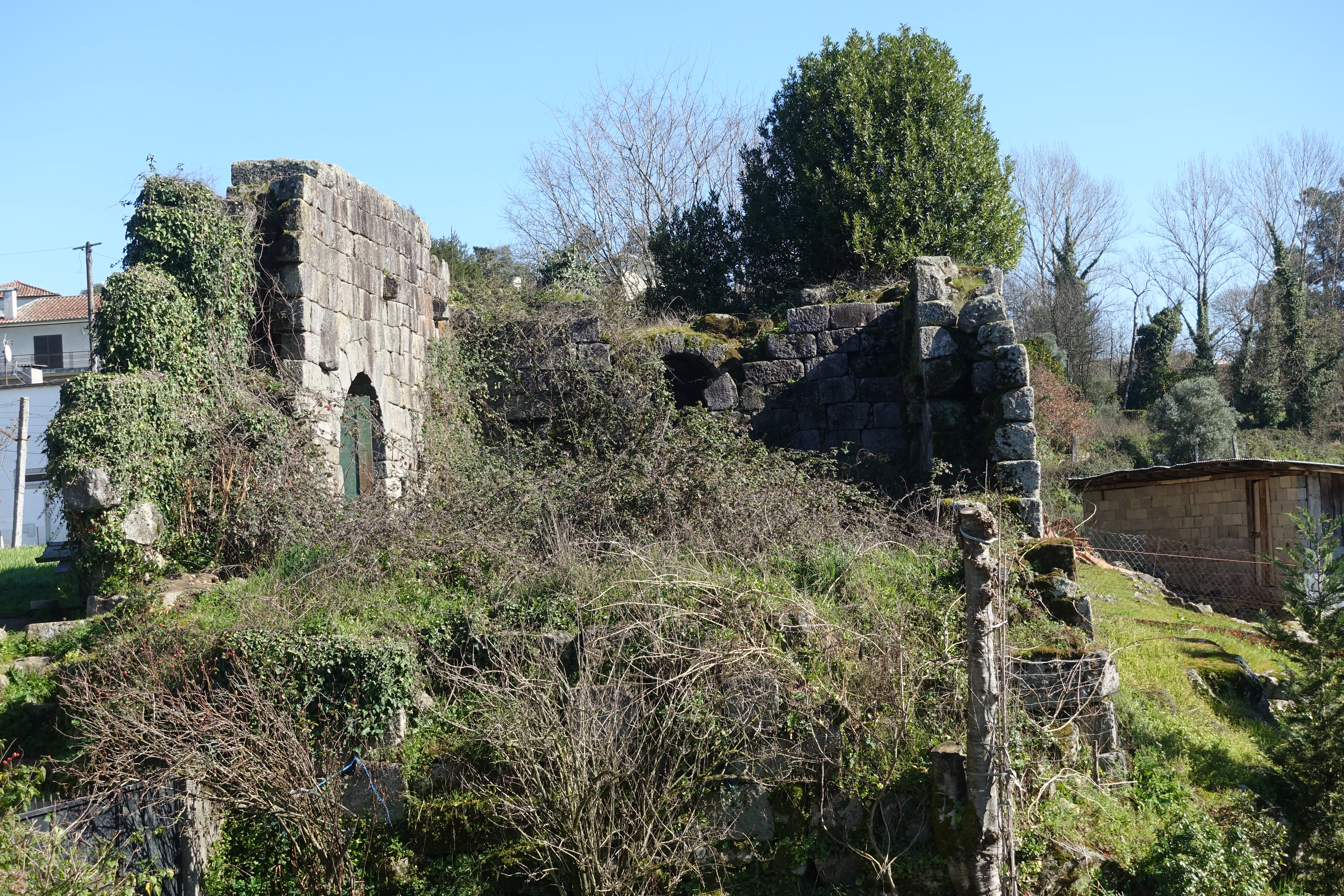
Ruins of Tower of Vasconcelos

Ferreiros is a former civil parish of the municipality of Amares in the Portuguese intermunicipal community Cávado. In 2013, the parish merged into the new parish Ferreiros, Prozelo e Besteiros. The population in 2011 was 3,212, in an area of 2.65 km^{2}.

== History ==
Ferreiros received its foral (charter) in 1514. Originally, it was called Feira-Nova (New Fair), then referring to its importance as the gathering-place for weekly fairs, a period when the populations of the parish and municipality were relatively small.

The patron saint of the parish is Santa Maria, or Nossa Senhora da Expectação (Our Lady of the Expectation), with a parochial cross located in the middle of the historical square that was the place for the weekly squares.

== Geography ==
Ferreiros is situated in the heart of Minho, along the valleys and hills created by confluent of the Homem and Cávado rivers, along the flanks of the Serra do Gerês mountains.

== Architecture ==
=== Civic ===
- Primary School of Ferreiros (Escola Primaria de Ferreiros), a 20th-century schoolhouse, constructed in the plans of the Repartição das Construções Escolares, a rectangular building with two wings and illuminated by several windows on its facade.
- Tower and Honour of the Vasconcelos (Ruínas da Torre e Honra de Vasconcelos/Casa dos Mouros), an example of one of a medieval fortified seigneurial residences comprising tower, annex and chapel.

=== Religious ===
- Chapel of Santa Luzia (Capela de Santa Luzia), a longitudinal chapel with unique nave and presbytery, site of annual pilgrimages on 25 December, that, along with an inscription, hints at its history affiliated with the Order of Malta.
- Church of Santa Maria (Igreja Paroquial de Ferreiros/Igreja de Santa Maria).
