= Fontelo =

- Civil parish
- Location in Portugal
- Coordinates: 41.122°N 7.731°W
- Country: Portugal
- Region: Norte
- Intermunic. comm.: Douro
- District: Viseu
- Municipality: Armamar

Area
  - Total: 7.52 km^{2} (2.90 sq mi)
- Elevation: 518 m (1,699 ft)

Population (2011)
  - Total: 641
  - Density: 85.2/km^{2} (221/sq mi)
- Time zone: UTC+00:00 (WET)
  - Summer (DST): UTC+01:00 (WEST)
- Postal code: 5110
- Area code: 254
- Patron: São Domingos
- Website: http://www.terralusa.net/index.php?site=120&sec=part4

Fontelo is a parish in the northern municipality of Armamar in Portugal. The population in 2011 was 641, in an area of 7.52 km^{2} (2.90 sq mi).

== History ==
There are a few elements that prove the antiquity of the settlement of Fontelo. The castro of São Domingos, which was a Romanized rural villa, marks the first referential indication of local settlement. The settlement's growth is intimately linked to the chapel that was constructed on Mount São Domingos, in place of a pagan shrine.

In the second half of the 12th century, Fontelo was divided into three "honours": that of Egas Moniz, that of Pero Viegas, and a Crown bridge.

Fontelo became a centre of the Knights Hospitaller by donation of Veraca Sanches, daughter of Sancho I of Portugal, which helped resettlement of the community. During the donatorio period, the primary benefactors were the Coutinho family, rich nobles who were alcaides of Lamego and Trancoso, and who later became Counts of Marialva. Later, it became a command of the Sovereign Military Order of Malta, with a resident bishop, granted by the Casa dos Santos. It was also the seat of a vicariate of the Bishopric of Lamego, later reduced to a rectorate.

Legend recounts that King Afonso V visited the ancient chapel of São Domingos with Queen Elizabeth of Portugal in 1454, on his journey to battle in Toro. Another visit was made a few years later by his son John II and Queen Leonor, to request divine intervention in order for the couple to conceive an heir to the throne. They returned in 1483, with their son, the Infante Afonso (born on 18 May 1475) and thereafter couples that wished to conceive used to sleep on the pedra propiciatória (favourable stone), also the fraga da fertilidade (boulder of fertility), located outside the door leading to the sacristy of the chapel.

The parish was established as a municipality on 17 May 1514 by the Manueline foral, with its own magistrate, secretary, two councilmen, a prosecutor, jail, municipal salon and pillory. The municipality was abolished in 1834-35, and the parish was integrated into the municipality of Armamar.

== Geography ==
Fontelo is the second most populous parish in the municipality of Armamar, with approximately 816 habitantes and 262 families. In addition to Fontelo, the locality of Balteiro, is another locality within its territory, six kilometres from the municipal seat. Three other localities are Comenda, Serra and Tapada.

== Economy ==
Agriculture, more specifically viniculture but also dairy and beef cattle, has been the most important part of the local economy. There is also civil construction and industry, primarily granite quarrying in the eastern part of Mount São Domingos.
