= Caldelas, Sequeiros e Paranhos =

- Civil parish
- Location in Portugal
- Coordinates: 41.668°N 8.375°W
- Country: Portugal
- Region: Norte
- Intermunic. comm.: Cávado
- District: Braga
- Municipality: Amares

Area
  - Total: 11.37 km^{2} (4.39 sq mi)

Population (2011)
  - Total: 1,187
  - Density: 104.4/km^{2} (270.4/sq mi)
- Time zone: UTC+00:00 (WET)
  - Summer (DST): UTC+01:00 (WEST)

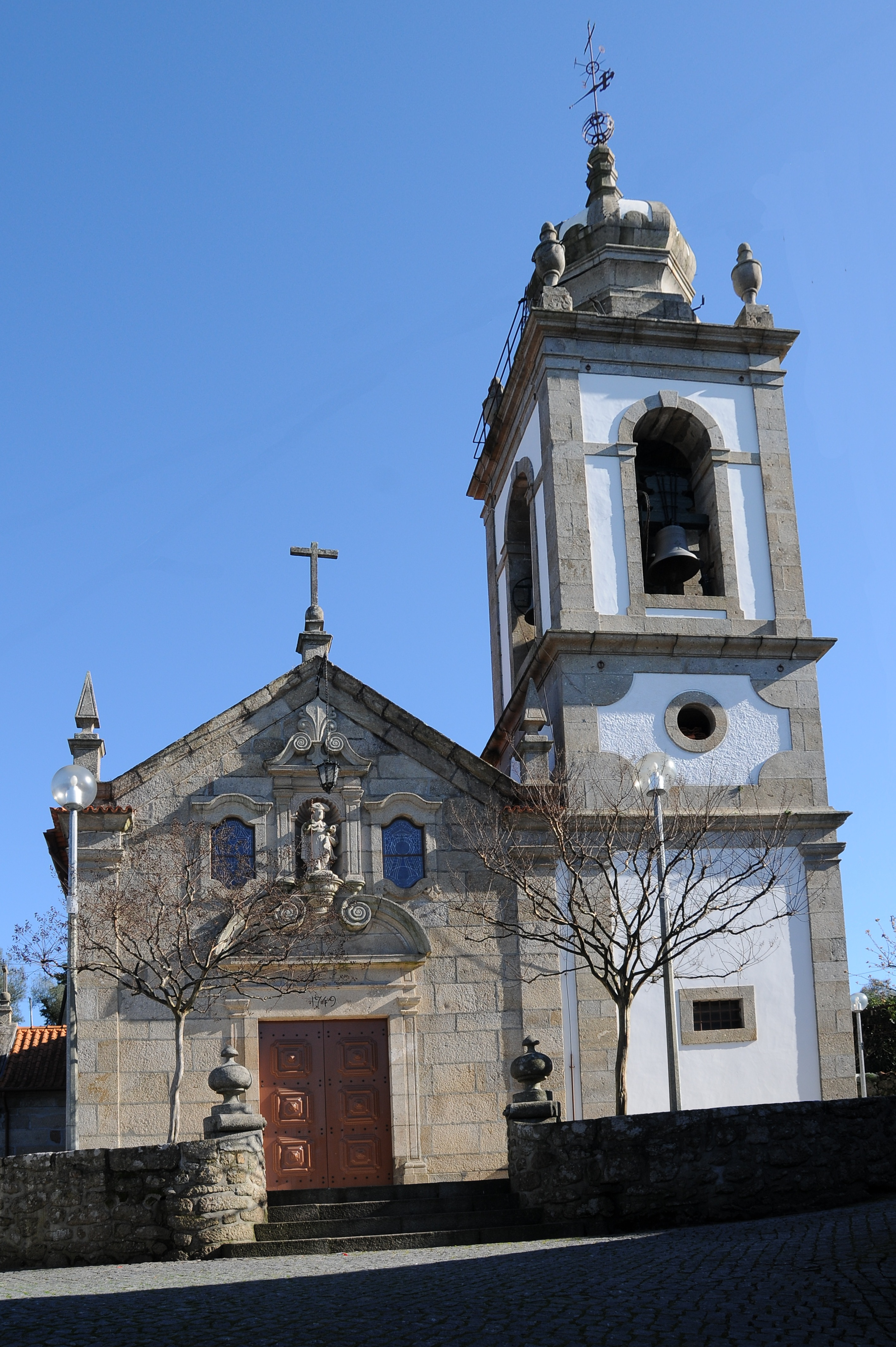

Caldelas, Sequeiros e Paranhos is a civil parish in the municipality of Amares, Braga District, Portugal. It was formed in 2013 by the merger of the former parishes Caldelas, Sequeiros and Paranhos. The population in 2011 was 1,187, in an area of 11.37 km^{2}.
