= Fontes (surname) =

Fontes (Portuguese pronunciation: ['fontɨʃ], meaning sources or fountains) is a Portuguese surname.

== Notable people with this surname ==
- Azdrubal Fontes Bayardo (1922–2006), Uruguayan racecar driver
- Flavia Fontes, Brazilian filmmaker and film editor
- Fontes Pereira de Melo (1819–1887), Portuguese statesman, politician, and engineer
- Guilherme Fontes (1967), Brazilian actor
- José Fontes Rocha (1926–2011), Portuguese singer and instrumentalist
- Wayne Fontes, former head coach of the Detroit Lions NFL team

== See also ==
- Fuentes (surname), Spanish variant
