= Ribafria =

- Civil parish
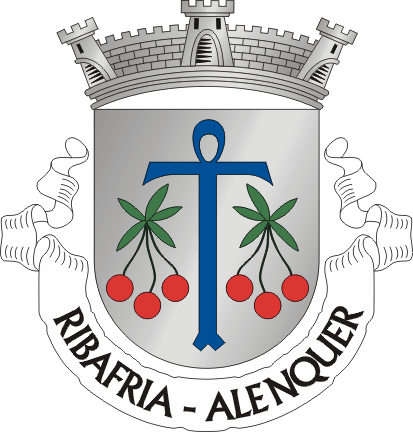
- Coat of arms

- Location in Portugal
- Coordinates: 39°03′N 9°05′W
- Country: Portugal
- Region: Oeste e Vale do Tejo
- Intermunic. comm.: Oeste
- District: Lisbon
- Municipality: Alenquer

Area
  - Total: 9.10 km^{2} (3.51 sq mi)

Population (2001)
  - Total: 974
  - Density: 110/km^{2} (280/sq mi)
- Time zone: UTC+00:00 (WET)
  - Summer (DST): UTC+01:00 (WEST)

Ribafria (Portuguese pronunciation: [ʁibɐˈfɾiɐ]) is a former civil parish, located in the municipality of Alenquer, in western Portugal. In 2013, the parish merged into the new parish Ribafria e Pereiro de Palhacana. It covers 9.10 km^{2} in area, with 974 inhabitants as of 2001.
