= Ribeirinha (Angra do Heroísmo) =

- Civil parish
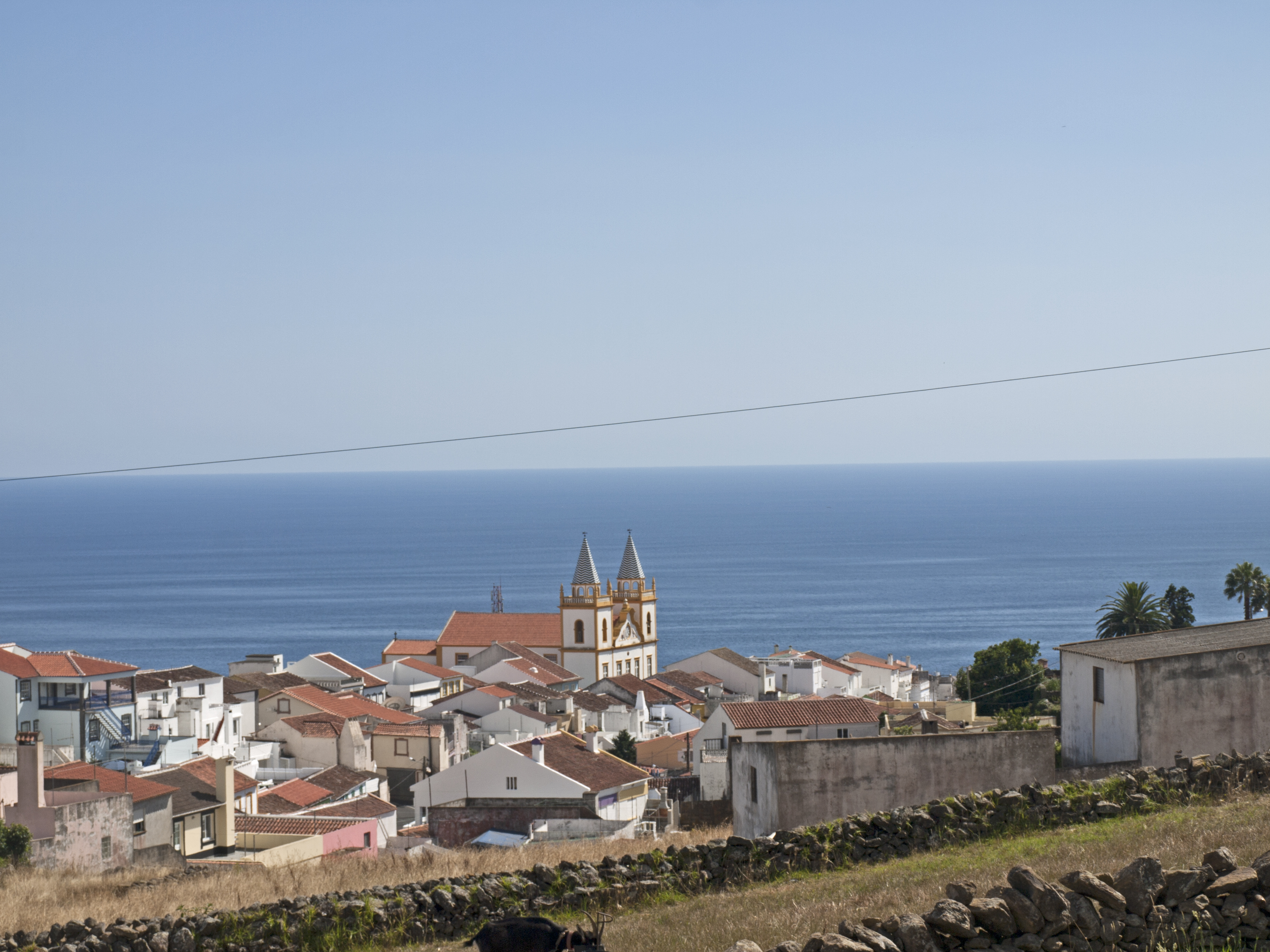
- Panorama of Ribeirinha

- Location in the Azores Ribeirinha (Terceira)
- Coordinates: 38°39′49″N 27°10′45″W
- Country: Portugal
- Auton. region: Azores
- Island: Terceira
- Municipality: Angra do Heroísmo

Area
  - Total: 7.53 km^{2} (2.91 sq mi)
- Elevation: 196 m (643 ft)

Population (2011)
  - Total: 2,684
  - Density: 356/km^{2} (923/sq mi)
- Time zone: UTC−01:00 (AZOT)
  - Summer (DST): UTC+00:00 (AZOST)
- Postal code: 9700-435
- Area code: 292
- Patron: São Pedro
- Website: http://www.jfribeirinha.com/

Ribeirinha (pronounced [ʁi.bɐj.ˈɾi.ɲɐ]) is a parish in the municipality of Angra do Heroísmo on the island of Terceira in the Azores. The population in 2011 was 2,684, in an area of 7.53 km^{2}.
