= Ferreiros, Prozelo e Besteiros =

- Civil parish
- Location in Portugal
- Coordinates: 41.629°N 8.364°W
- Country: Portugal
- Region: Norte
- Intermunic. comm.: Cávado
- District: Braga
- Municipality: Amares

Area
  - Total: 7.34 km^{2} (2.83 sq mi)

Population (2011)
  - Total: 4,573
  - Density: 620/km^{2} (1,600/sq mi)
- Time zone: UTC+00:00 (WET)
  - Summer (DST): UTC+01:00 (WEST)

Ferreiros, Prozelo e Besteiros is a civil parish in the municipality of Amares, Braga District, Portugal. It was formed in 2013 by the merger of the former parishes Ferreiros, Prozelo and Besteiros. The population in 2011 was 4,573, in an area of 7.34 km^{2} (2.83 sq mi).
