= Charneca de Caparica =

Charneca da Caparica
- Civil parish
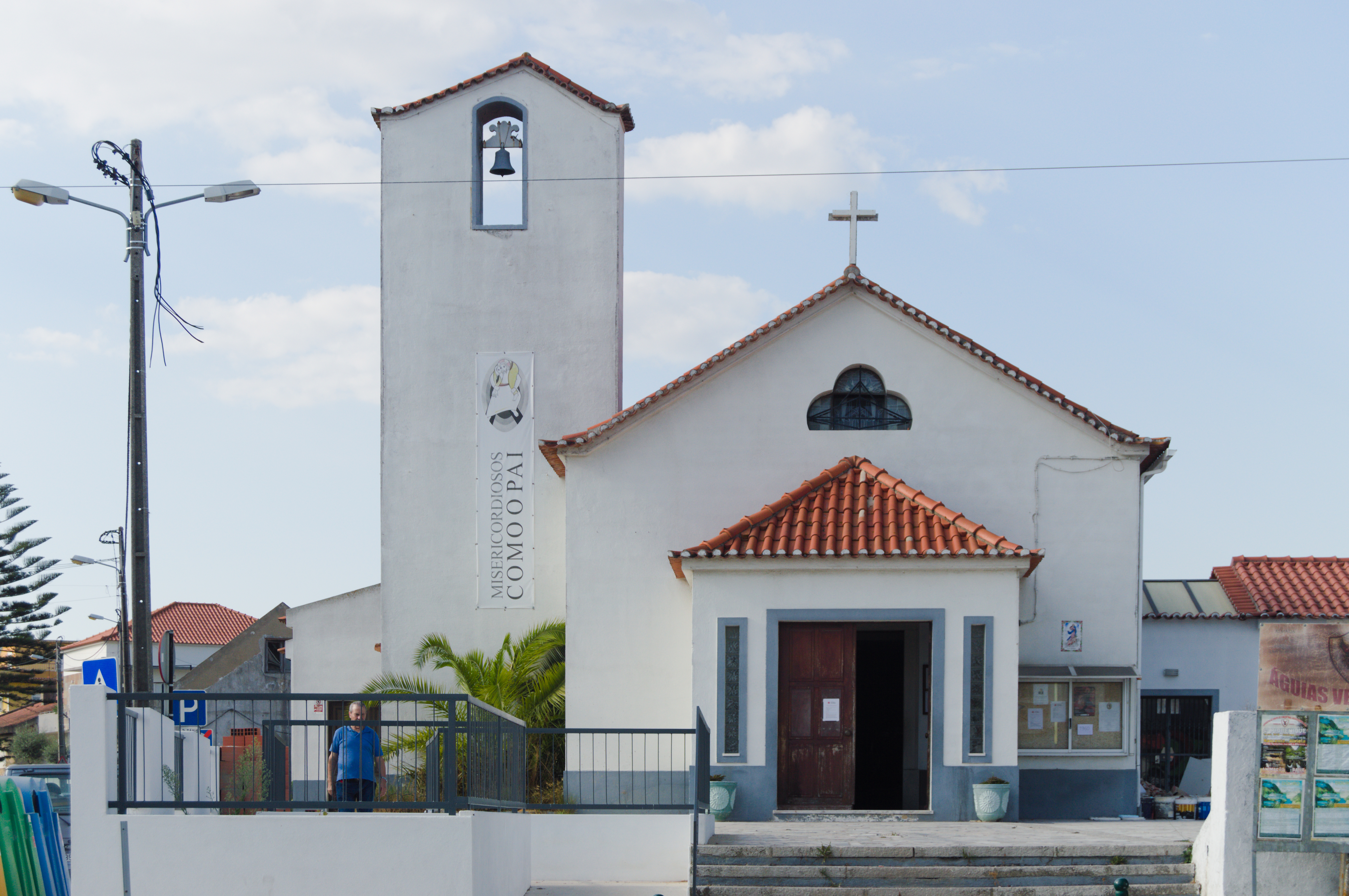
- Parish church

- Location in Portugal
- Coordinates: 38.63°N 9.20°W
- Country: Portugal
- Region: Lisbon
- Metropolitan area: Lisbon
- District: Setúbal
- Municipality: Almada
- Disbanded: 2013

Area
  - Total: 23.14 km^{2} (8.93 sq mi)

Population (2011)
  - Total: 29,763
  - Density: 1,286/km^{2} (3,331/sq mi)
- Time zone: UTC+00:00 (WET)
  - Summer (DST): UTC+01:00 (WEST)
- Postal code: P-2820
- Website: http://www.jf-charneca-caparica.pt

Charneca de Caparica (Portuguese pronunciation: [ʃɐɾˈnɛkɐ ðɐ kɐpɐˈɾikɐ]) is a former civil parish in the municipality of Almada, Lisbon metropolitan area, Portugal. In 2013, the parish merged into the new parish Charneca de Caparica e Sobreda. The population in 2011 was 29,763, in an area of 23.14 km^{2}.
