= Santa Luzia (Angra do Heroísmo) =

- Civil parish
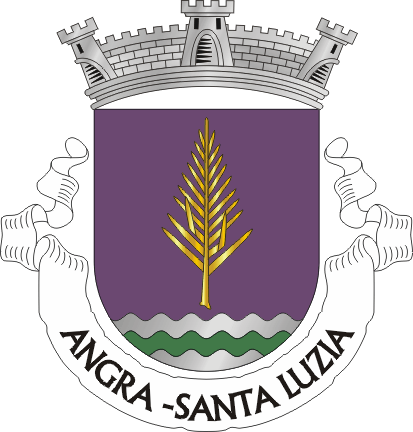
- Coat of arms

- Location in the Azores Santa Luzia (Terceira)
- Coordinates: 38°39′39″N 27°13′22″W
- Country: Portugal
- Auton. region: Azores
- Island: Terceira
- Municipality: Angra do Heroísmo
- Established: Parish: 18 August 1595 (426 Years)

Area
  - Total: 1.26 km^{2} (0.49 sq mi)
- Elevation: 89 m (292 ft)

Population (2011)
  - Total: 2,755
  - Density: 2,200/km^{2} (5,700/sq mi)
- Time zone: UTC−01:00 (AZOT)
  - Summer (DST): UTC+00:00 (AZOST)
- Postal code: 9700-072
- Area code: 292
- Patron: Santa Luzia

Santa Luzia (Portuguese for Saint Lucy) is a parish in the municipality of Angra do Heroísmo on the island of Terceira, in the Azores. The population in 2011 was 2,755, in an area of 1.26 km^{2}. It is the smallest parish in Angra do Heroísmo. Part of its territory integrates the historical center of the city of Angra do Heroísmo classified as UNESCO World Heritage. Its built heritage includes the monument Memória a D. Pedro IV, the mansion Madre de Deus, the Church of Santa Luzia and Angra do Heroísmo Cultural and Congress Center.

== History ==
Of the five civil parishes that constitute the urban area of Angra do Heroísmo, Santa Luzia is the most recent, founded in the first years of the Iberian Union (on 18 August 1595). It was Bishop Manuel de Gouveia (then bishop of Angra) who proposed the creation of the ecclesiastical parish from a portion of Sé, that included: the Rua de Paulus Gomes the two bands until the home of George de Lemos de Betancor, down to the fountain and forward to the house of the sheriff, from there to the Castle and from there to the Serra cut by the ravine and mills with all the residents that exist within those limits. He justified it owing to the large faith community, the need to control transit on the island's port and the necessity to have access to health care services (at the time administered by the church).

At the time of its creation the parish of Santa Luzia had only about 300 homes, with four per capita, the population only consisted of between 1200 and 1500 souls. There already existed a hermitage to the invocation of Santa Luzia, simplifying the de-annexation of the parish; it was constructed originally by a pious couple at the limits of their property, João vaz Merens and Catarina Lourenço Fagundes, although their selection of Saint Lucia is unclear.

In a documented dated in 1551, Joana Fernandes ou Rodrigues, a widow, donated lands in order to raise a church to Santa Luzia, reformulate or expand the existing hermitage (ostensibly for the founders and not for a future church) at the end of the 16th century.
