= Requeixo, Nossa Senhora de Fátima e Nariz =

Civil parish in Portugal

- Civil parish
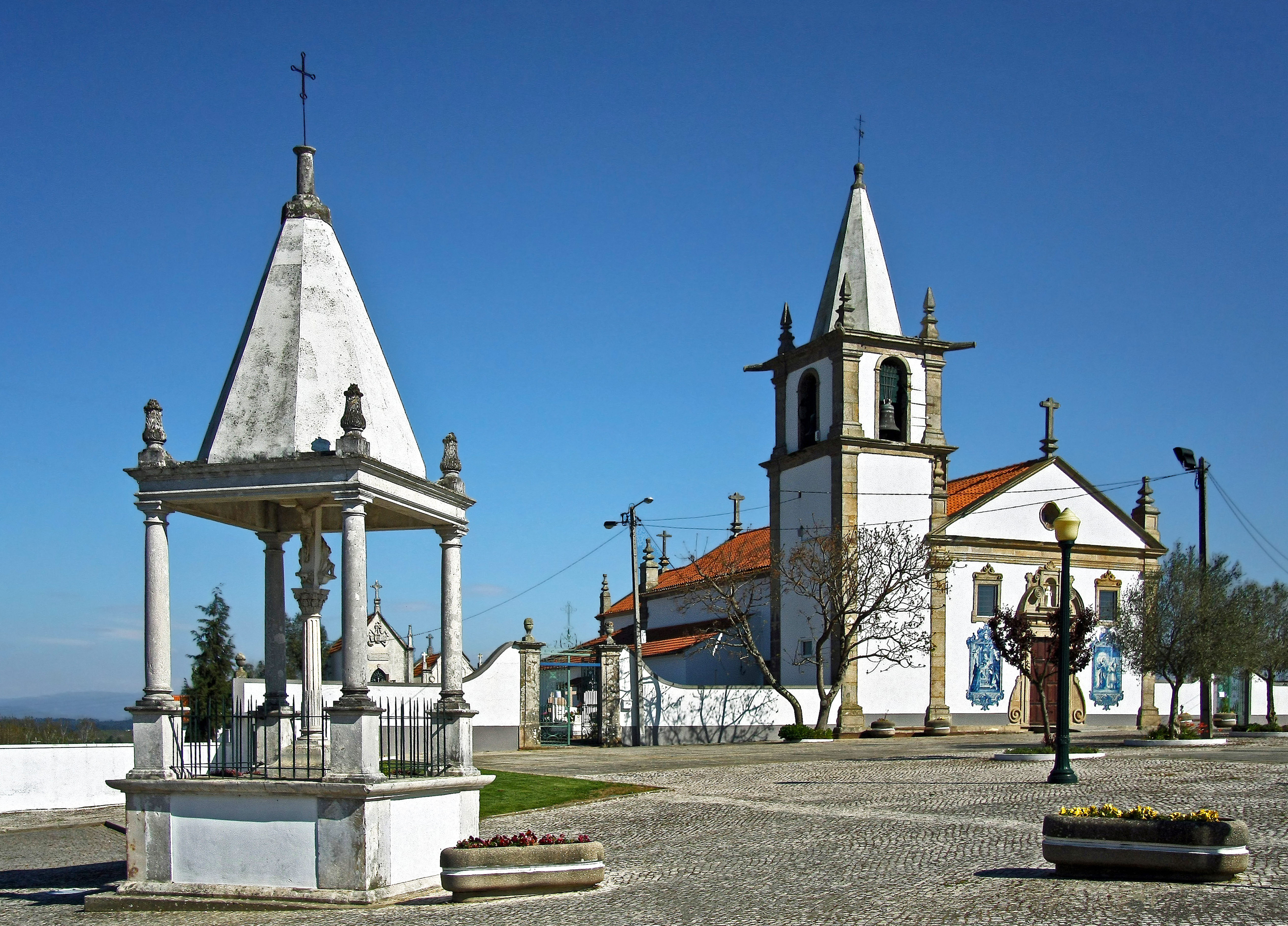

- Location in Portugal
- Coordinates: 40.579°N 8.579°W
- Country: Portugal
- Region: Centro
- Intermunic. comm.: Região de Aveiro
- District: Aveiro
- Municipality: Aveiro

Area
  - Total: 32.32 km^{2} (12.48 sq mi)

Population (2011)
  - Total: 4,564
  - Density: 141.2/km^{2} (365.7/sq mi)
- Time zone: UTC+00:00 (WET)
  - Summer (DST): UTC+01:00 (WEST)

Requeixo, Nossa Senhora de Fátima e Nariz is a civil parish in the municipality of Aveiro, Portugal. It was formed in 2013 by the merger of the former parishes Requeixo, Nossa Senhora de Fátima and Nariz. The population in 2011 was 4,564, in an area of 32.32 km^{2}.
