= Salvador do Monte =

Civil parish in Amarante, Portugal

- Civil parish
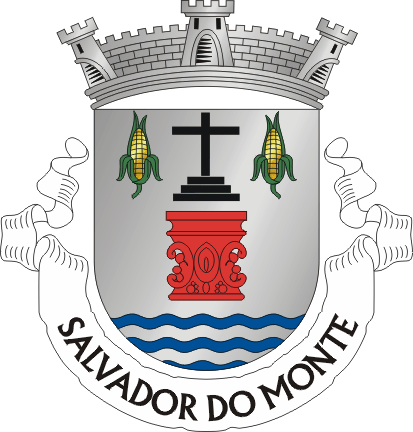
- Coat of arms

- Coordinates: 41.240°N 8.089°W
- Country: Portugal
- Region: Norte
- District: Porto
- Municipality: Amarante

Area
  - Total: 7.48 km^{2} (2.89 sq mi)

Population (2021)
  - Total: 894
  - Density: 120/km^{2} (310/sq mi)
- Time zone: UTC+00:00 (WET)
  - Summer (DST): UTC+01:00 (WEST)

Salvador do Monte is a civil parish (freguesia) in the municipality of Amarante, in the Porto District of northern Portugal. It covers an area of 7.48 km² and had a population of 894 inhabitants according to the 2021 census.

== History ==
The parish has a long-standing religious and historical identity associated with the dedication to the Divine Saviour (Divino Salvador). Historical records document the existence of the parish and its religious institutions over several centuries. The parish archives include baptismal, marriage and burial registers dating from 1591 onwards.

The parish church was originally situated on the hill of Nossa Senhora de Louredo. Following its relocation, the former site continued to be associated with burials, and a stone cross was erected there. A gravestone dated 1666 was also recorded near the former church site.

In the 18th century, the parish church contained five altars, including the main altar dedicated to the Blessed Sacrament and several side altars. The church also housed religious images and devotional objects associated with local brotherhoods and confraternities, including those dedicated to the Rosary, the Child Jesus and Saint Sebastian.

== Heritage ==
=== Parish Church ===
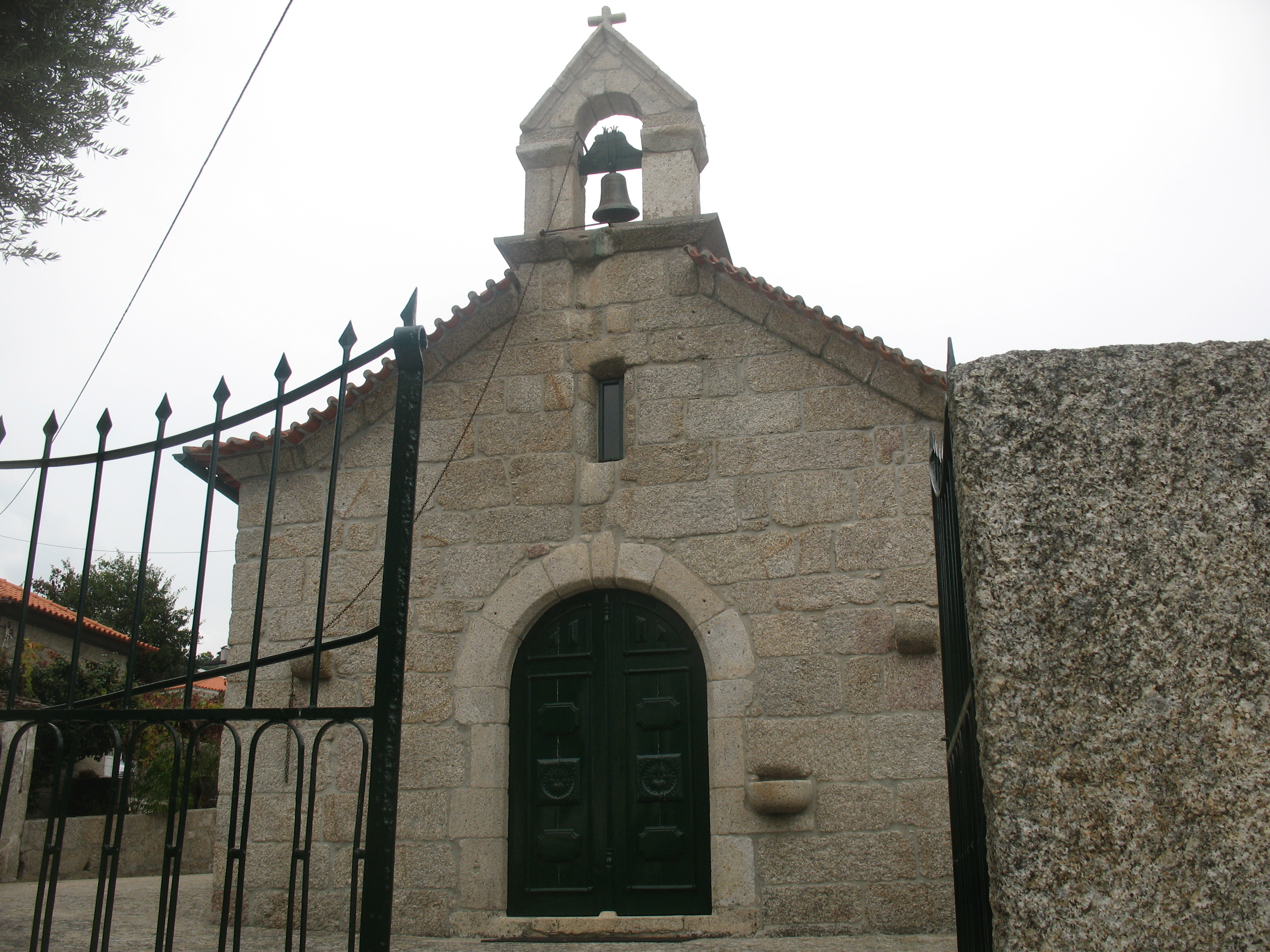
Parish Church of Salvador do Monte

The Parish Church of Salvador do Monte (Igreja Matriz de Salvador do Monte), dedicated to the Divine Saviour, is one of the principal historical buildings in the parish. Its interior includes decorative woodcarving (talha) associated with the João V Baroque style, particularly in the main altarpiece and pulpit.

The church and its religious furnishings reflect the development of ecclesiastical art and devotional practices in the Amarante region during the 17th and 18th centuries.

=== Louredo ===
The former site of the parish church on the hill of Nossa Senhora de Louredo preserves evidence of the parish's earlier religious history. The location was used for burials and was marked by a stone cross following the relocation of the church.

== Demographics ==
Salvador do Monte had 894 inhabitants in the 2021 census, representing a decrease from the 1,066 residents recorded in 2011.

Population of Salvador do Monte
Year	Population
2001	1,154
2011	1,066
2021	894
