= Armamar =

- Municipality
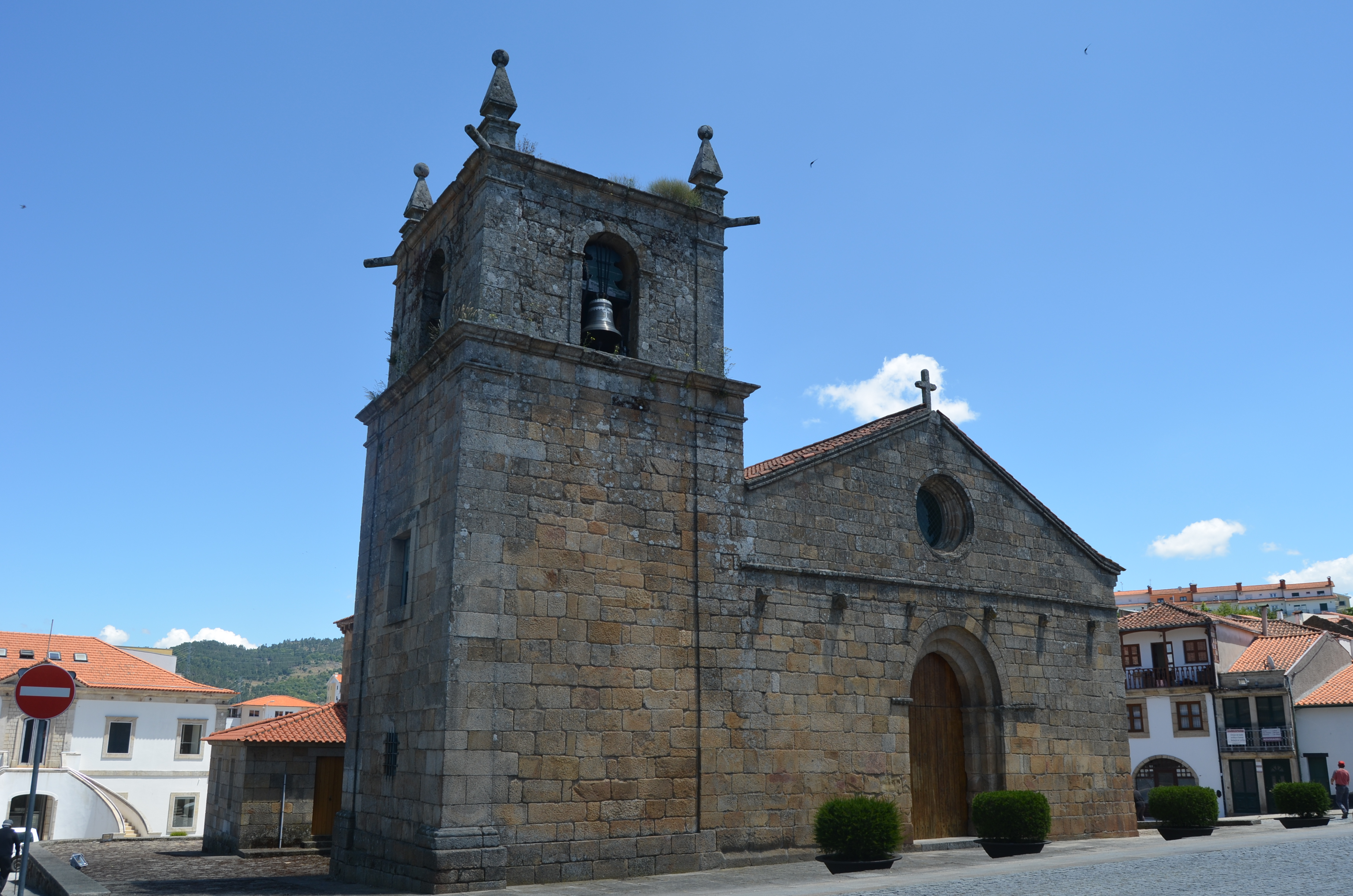
- View of Armamar

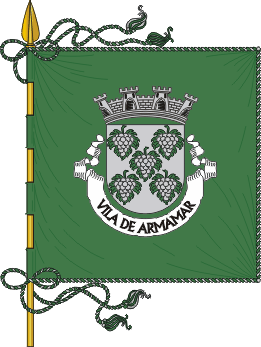
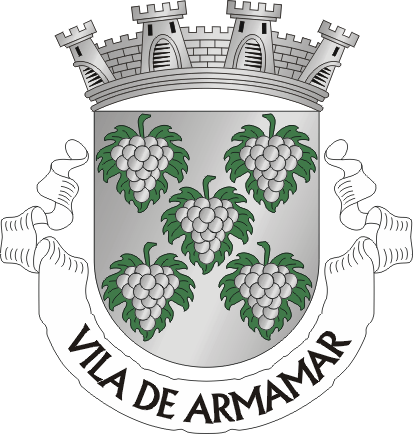
- Flag Coat of arms
- Interactive map of Armamar
- Location in Portugal
- Coordinates: 41°6′34″N 7°41′32″W
- Country: Portugal
- Region: Norte
- Intermunic. comm.: Douro
- District: Viseu
- Parishes: 14

Government
  - President: Hernâni Pinto Fonseca Almeida (PPD-PSD)

Area
  - Total: 117.24 km^{2} (45.27 sq mi)
- Elevation: 575 m (1,886 ft)

Population (2011)
  - Total: 6,297
  - Density: 53.71/km^{2} (139.1/sq mi)
- Time zone: UTC+00:00 (WET)
  - Summer (DST): UTC+01:00 (WEST)
- Postal code: 5110
- Area code: 254
- Patron: São Miguel

Armamar (Portuguese pronunciation: [ɐɾmɐˈmaɾ]) is a municipality in Viseu District in Portugal. The population in 2011 was 6,297, in an area of 117.24 km^{2}.

== Geography ==
Administratively, the municipality is divided into 15 civil parishes (freguesias):

- Aldeias
- Aricera e Goujoim
- Armamar
- Cimbres
- Folgosa
- Fontelo
- Queimada
- Queimadela
- Santa Cruz
- São Cosmado
- São Martinho das Chãs
- São Romão e Santiago
- Vacalar
- Vila Seca e Santo Adrião
- Coura

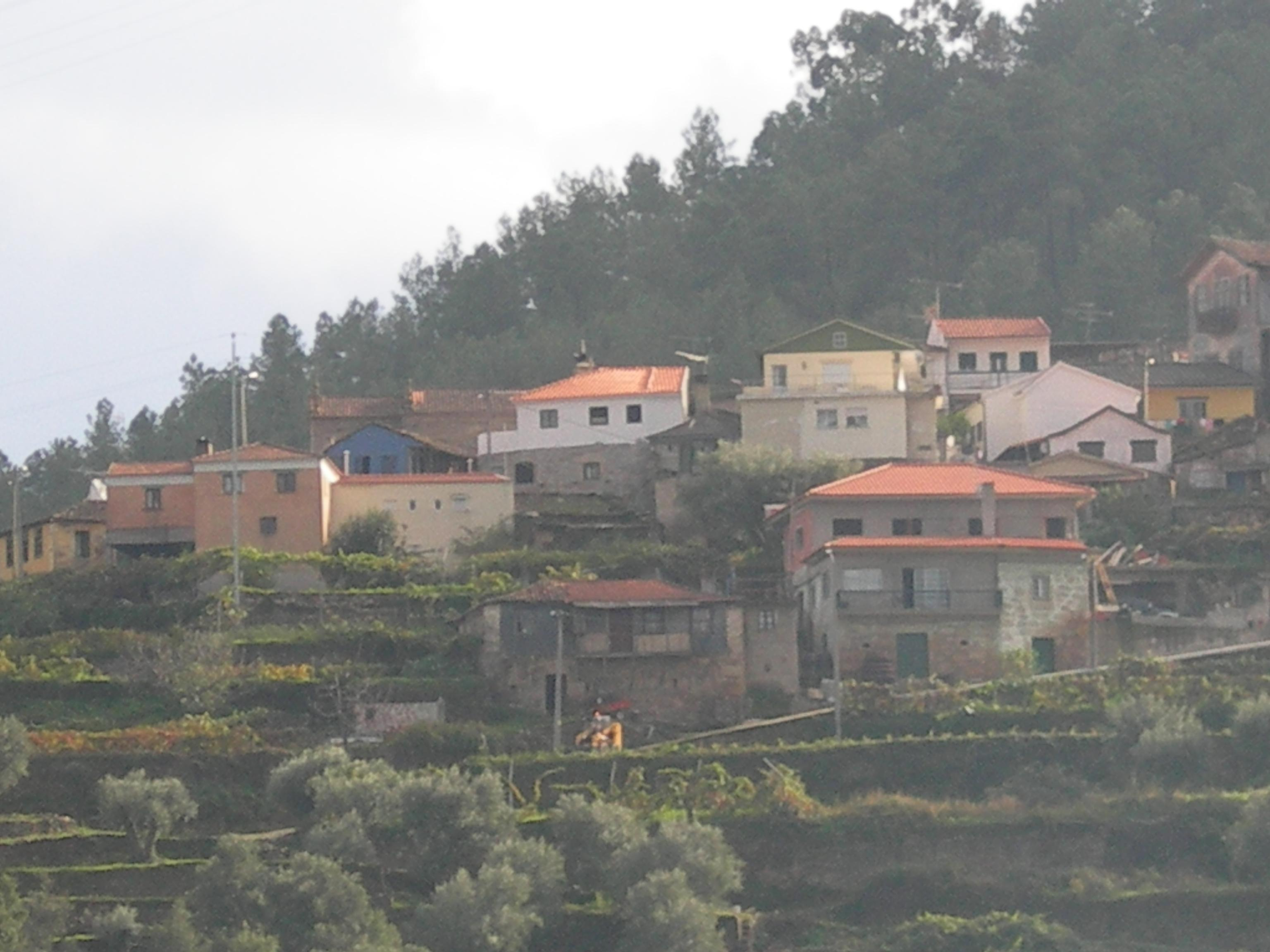
A portion of the village of Santo Adrião
