= Castle of Aguiar da Beira =

Portuguese medieval castle

- Castelo de Aguiar da Beira
- Guarda, Dão-Lafões, Centro in Portugal
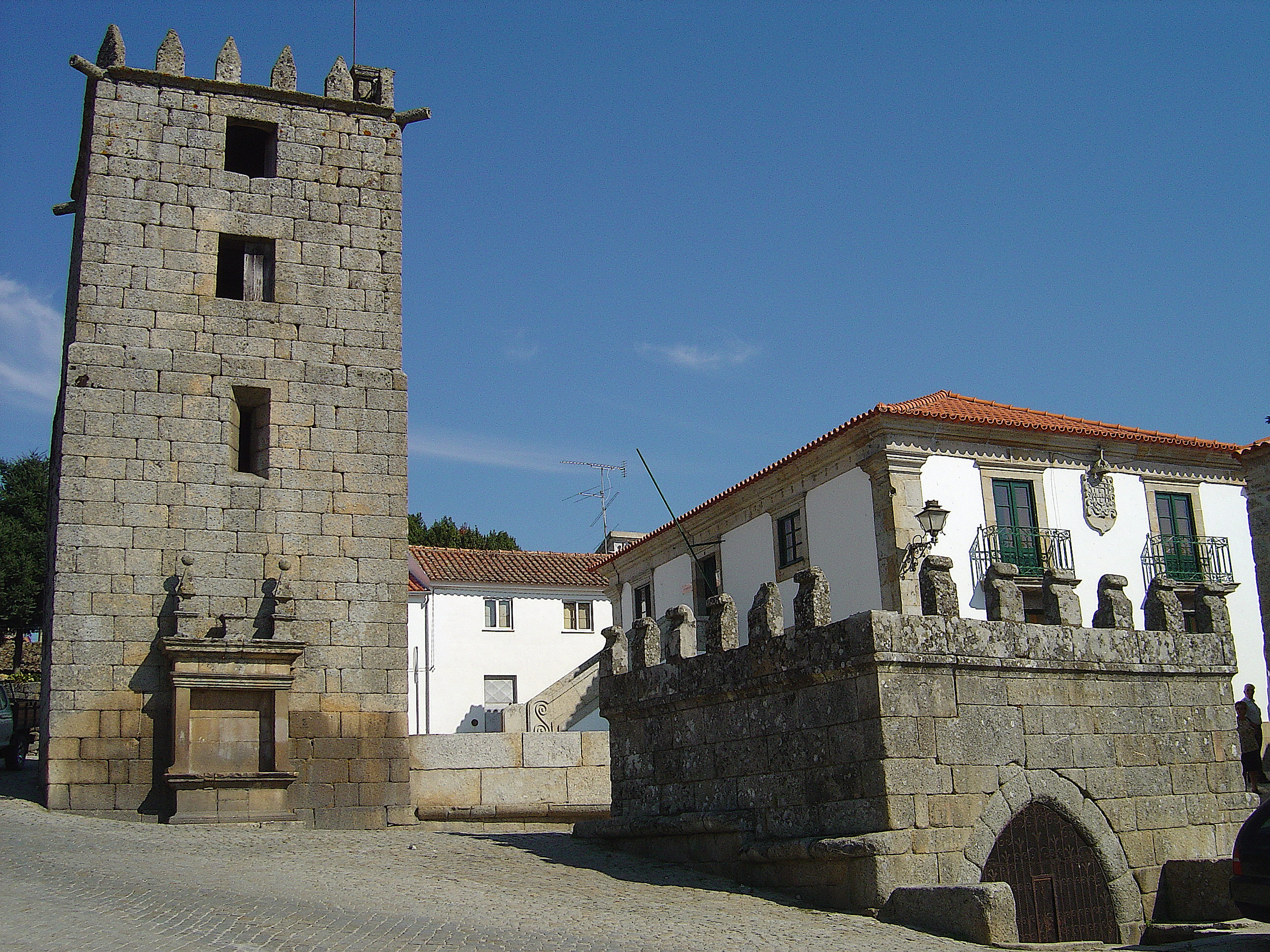
- The mis-named "Clock Tower": the Castle of Aguiar da Beira and the Fonte Ameada in the central square

Site information
- Type: Castle
- Owner: Portuguese Republic
- Operator: Câmara Municipal de Aguiar da Beira, ceded on 9 October 1946
- Open to the public: Public

Location
- Coordinates: 40°49′00″N 7°32′43″W

The Castle of Aguiar da Beira (Portuguese: Castelo de Aguiar da Beira) is a Portuguese medieval castle in civil parish of Aguiar da Beira e Coruche, in the municipality of Aguiar da Beira, in the Centro district of Guarda.

== History ==
The site was reconstructed in the beginning of the 14th century, based on a former castro and pre-national settlement, during the reign of Kind D. Dinis. It is assumed that the existing tower was part of the defensive systems, that included a watchtower and prison, that was expanded over time. Of this castle, only the walls of the castle, overlooking the square and water deposit, and the keep tower.

The castle was dismantled over time, and its materials reused for other purposes.

In the 17th century, gargoyles were installed on the tower, also designated at the time as the Torre da Cabicanca, which related it to the legend of a stork that terrorized the inhabitants.

During the Restoration Wars (in the 18th century), the castle continued to defend the territory. By 1777, the clock was restored.

In 1922, the property was classified along with the Pillory of Aguiar da Beira and the fountain of Aguiar da Beira.

The first work to support and conserve the tower occurred in 1942, by the DGEMN Direção Geral de Edíficos e Monumentos Nacionais (Directorate General for Buildings and National Monuments). This work (between 1942 and 1943) included the consolidation and repairs to the stairs, cornerstones, battlements, merlons and slabs, as well as the joints with water-resistant mortar and reinforced concrete. Work on the interior occurred in 1945, with replacement of wood flooring and stairs.

== Architecture ==
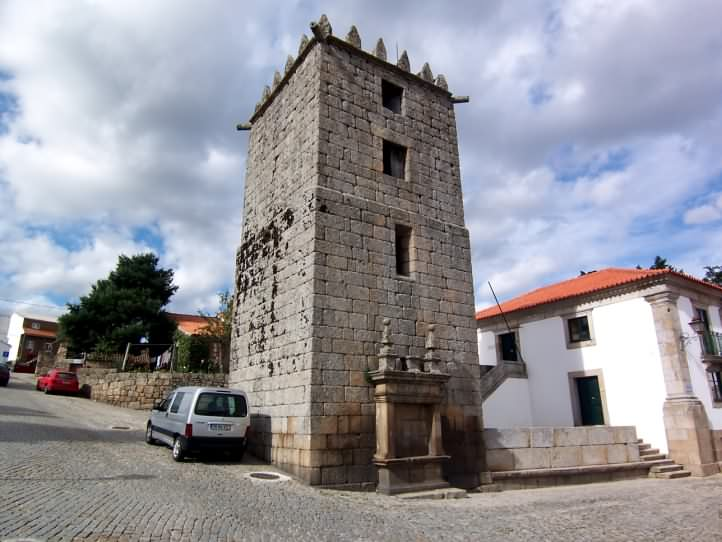
The two-story vertical tower, with the lower section protruding

The tower and the remnants of the castle are situated on a hillside, in the principal square of the settlement, in an irregular configuration along the Rua da Misericórdia, Rua Direita, Rua de Baixo and Rua do Castanheiro, as well as the 17th century municipal hall. Addorsed to the southeast facade of the tower, is an old Passo da Via Sacra, that includes an ample base comprising a polygonal and vertical niche decorated with a double cornice and frieze, surmounted by three pyramidal pinnacles with spheres (and the central over plinth). The square is paved in granite blocks, highlighted by the Pillory of Aguiar da Beira and the Fonte Ameada.

The vertical, square-shaped tower is covered in homogeneous tiles. Its facades are covered in masonry in the opus isodomum style, topped with a rectangular cornice and triangular crenellations, with four, tubular gargoyles along each corner. The main facade, in the southeast, includes two registers with the lower one protruding. On top of the building is a belfrey. On the ground floor is a rectilinear slot in slate, and the second by two rectangular windows (one over the other), while the rear and lateral facades of the same register have no openings. The right lateral facade (facing the northeast) has a full arch door, with access by a step, framed and formed by staves, protected by a wooden door.

The interior includes single spaces on four floors separated by wooden floors and accessed by wooden stairs. The entrance hall has a dirt floor, and the roof is covered in wood framing, that supports the roof.
