= Aguiar da Beira (freguesia) =

- Civil parish
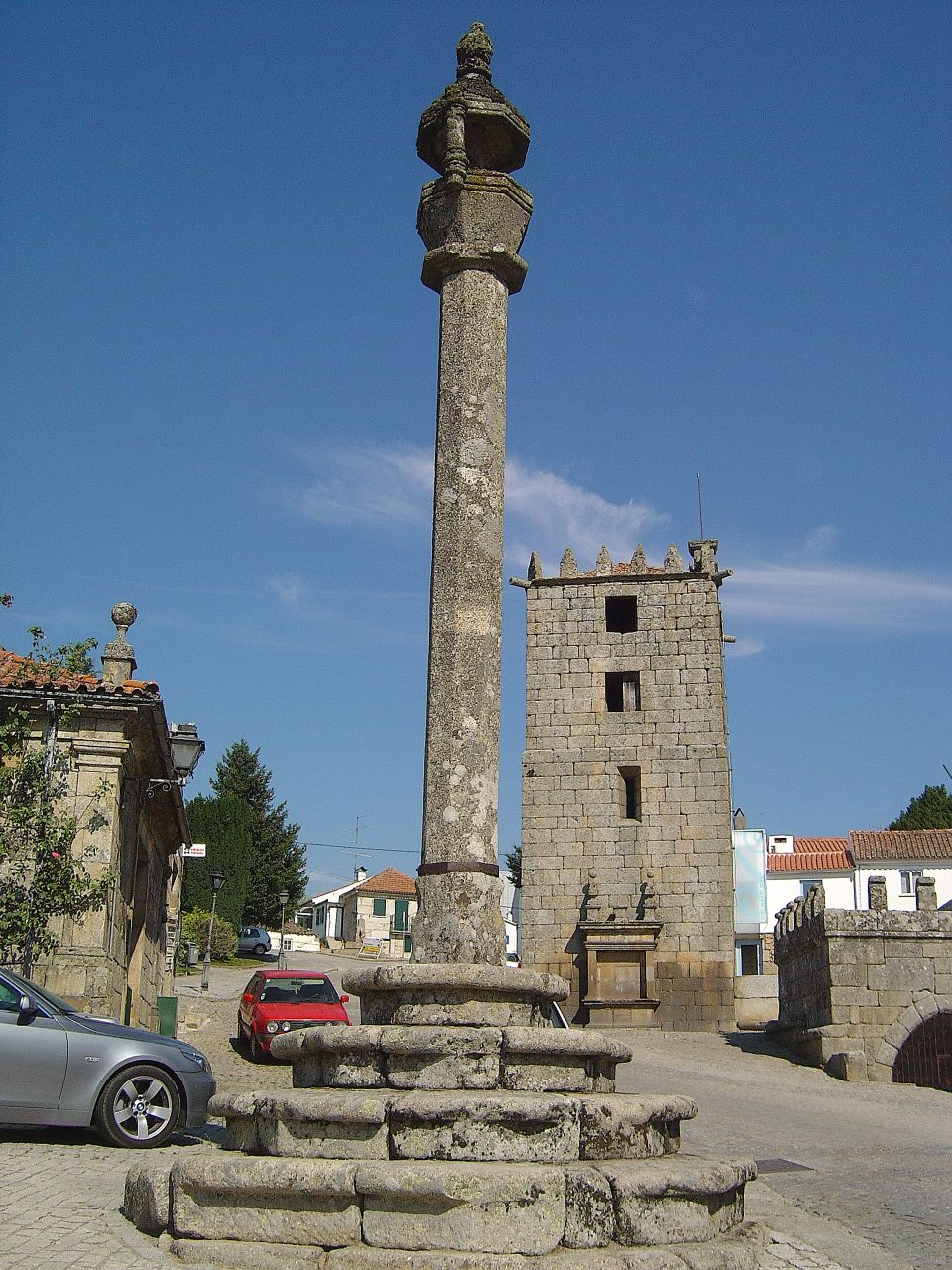
- The Pillory of Aguiar da Beira.

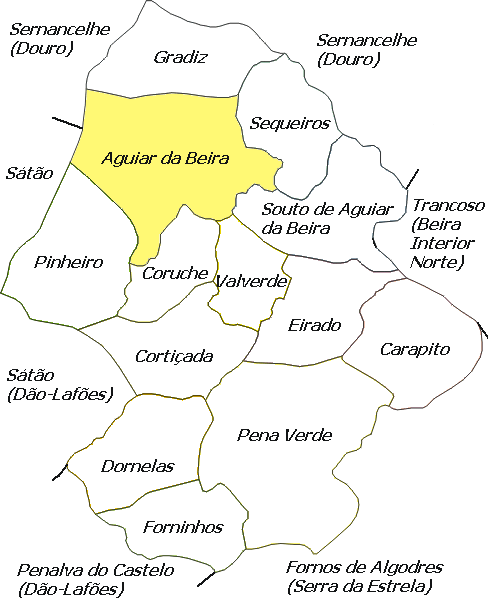
- Location of Aguiar da Beira in Aguiar da Beira Municipality
- Coordinates: 40°49′02″N 7°32′36″W
- Country: Portugal
- Region: Centro
- Intermunic. comm.: Viseu Dão Lafões
- District: Guarda
- Municipality: Aguiar da Beira

Area
  - Total: 34.04 km^{2} (13.14 sq mi)

Population (2001)
  - Total: 1,478
  - Density: 43.42/km^{2} (112.5/sq mi)
- Time zone: UTC+00:00 (WET)
  - Summer (DST): UTC+01:00 (WEST)

Aguiar da Beira is a former freguesia ("civil parish") in Aguiar da Beira Municipality, Guarda District, Portugal. It was merged with Coruche in 2013 to form the new freguesia Aguiar da Beira e Coruche. The Pillory of Aguiar da Beira is located in this former freguesia.

== Demography ==
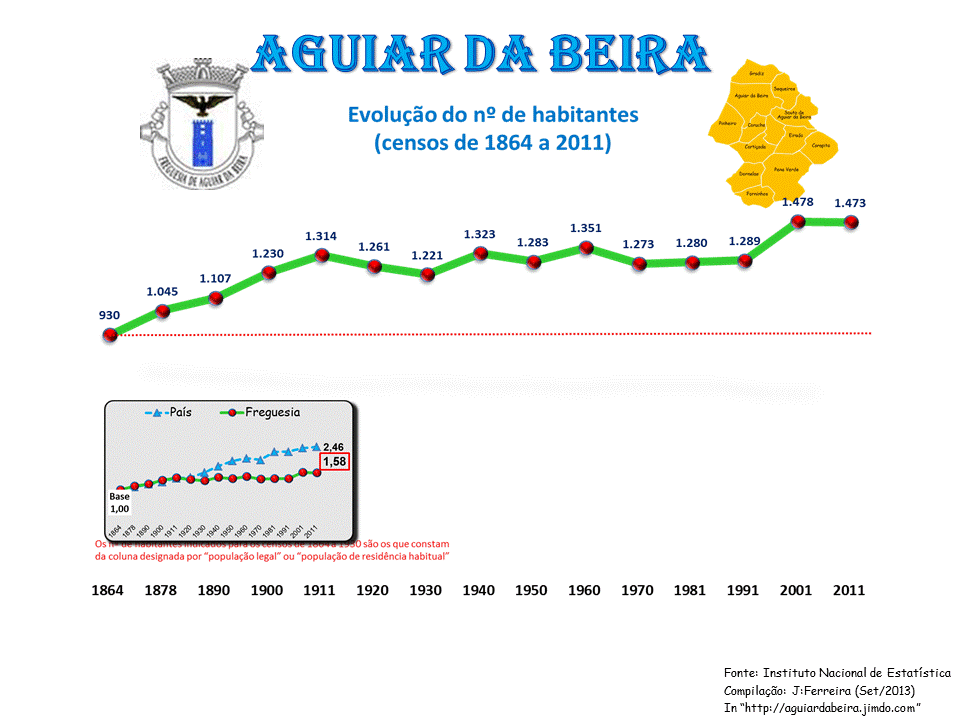
Population from 1864 to 2011

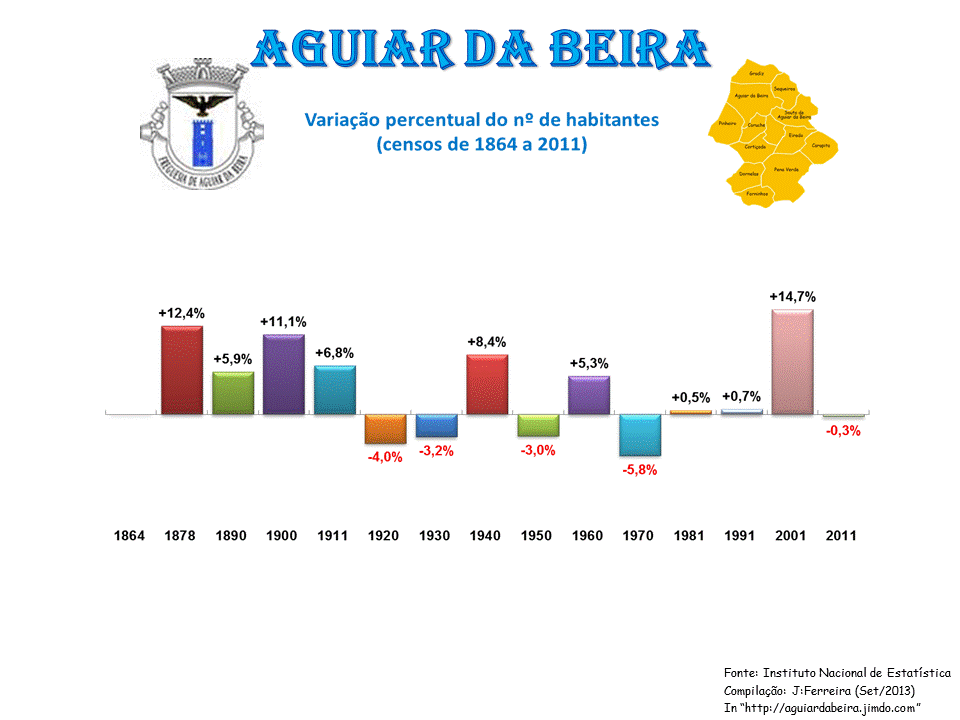
Population variation from 1864 to 2011
