= Dão River =

River in northern Portugal

Dão river
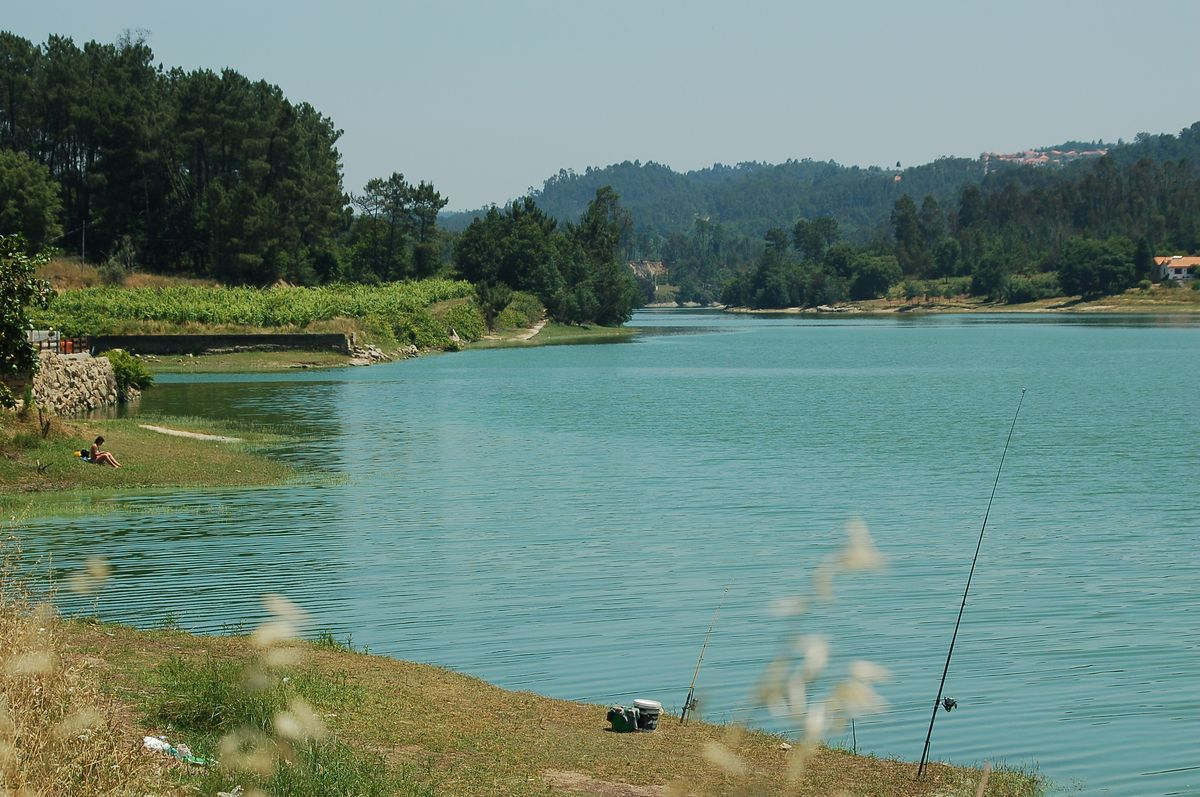
- Native name: Rio Dão (Portuguese)

Physical characteristics
- Source: Eirado
  - location: Aguiar da Beira
  - coordinates: 40°47'09.4"N 7°29'52.2"W
  - elevation: 750 m
- Mouth: Mondego River
  - location: Foz do Dão, Santa Comba Dão
  - coordinates: 40°20'27.4"N 8°10'51.2"W
  - elevation: 110 - 124,7 m
- Basin size: 1377 km2

Basin features
- Tributaries
  - left: Carapito stream
  - right: Coja stream, Sátão River, Criz River

Dão (Portuguese pronunciation: [dɐ̃w]) is a Portuguese river that originates in the plateau regions of Trancoso-Aguiar da Beira in the Eirado parish, Aguiar da Beira Municipality, Guarda District, and varies between 714 and 757 metres (2,343 and 2,484 ft) in elevation.

It flows in a general northeast–southwest direction, passing through Barragem de Fagilde and crosses or demarcates the limits of the councils of Aguiar da Beira, Penalva do Castelo, Mangualde, Viseu, Carregal do Sal, Nelas, Tondela, and Santa Comba Dão. It empties into the Mondego River, in the limits of the councils of Santa Comba Dão, Mortágua, and Penacova, after covering about 100 kilometres (62 mi).

Its granite-sloped valley is situated in the "Região Demarcada do Dão", where the Vinho do Dão wines are produced.

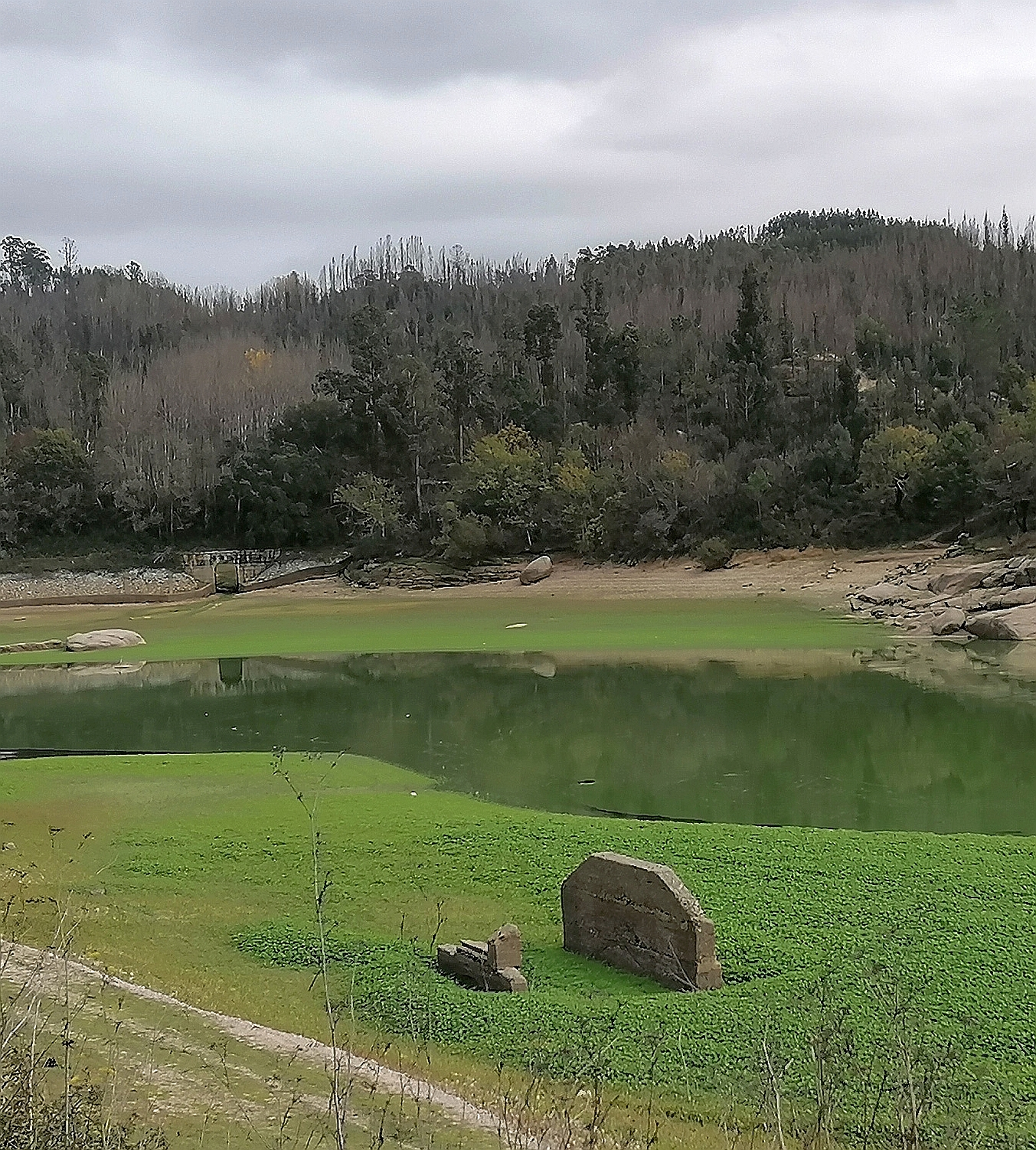
Low water level in Dão river

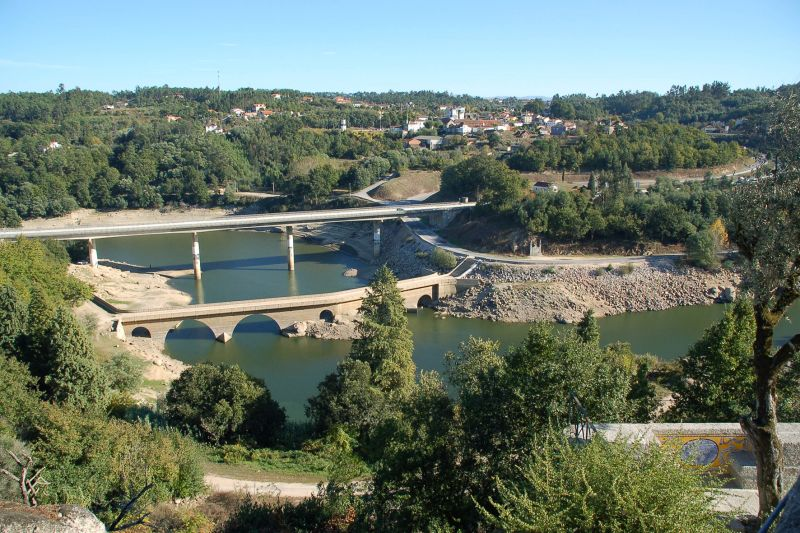
Dão River at Santa Comba Dão

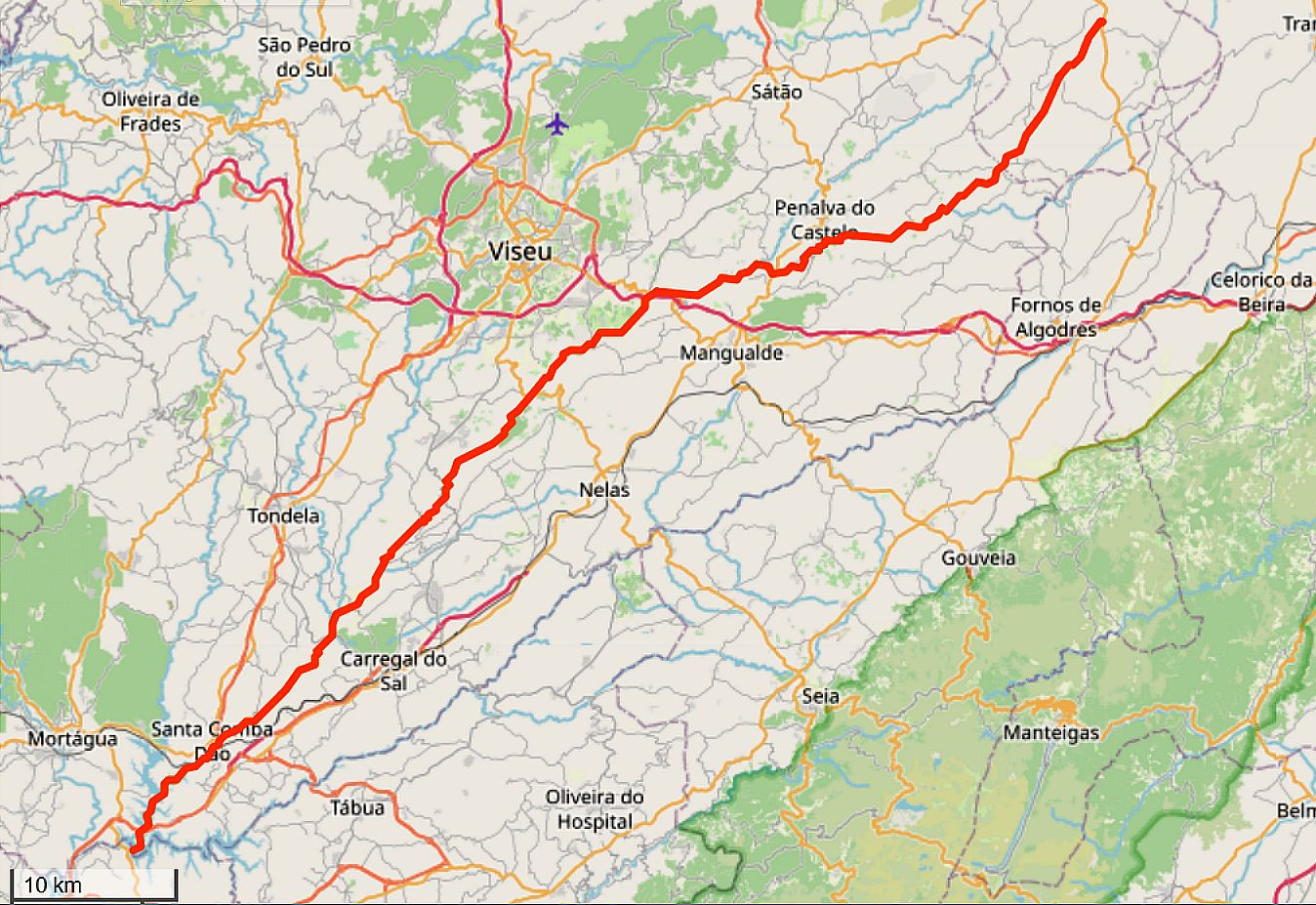
