= Sequeiros (Aguiar da Beira) =

- Civil parish
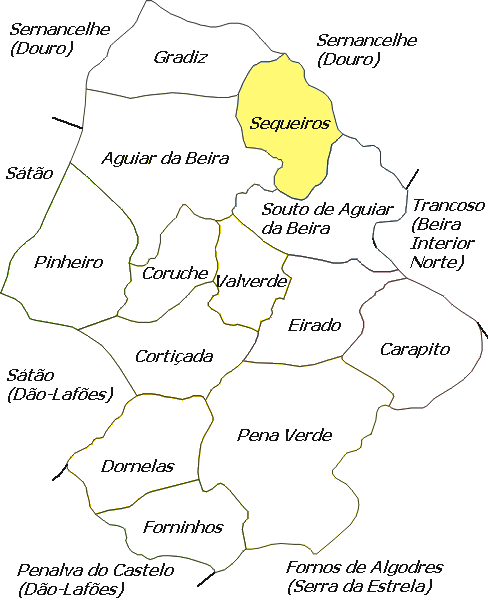
- Location of Sequeiros in Aguiar da Beira Municipality
- Coordinates: 40°50′23″N 7°30′30″W
- Country: Portugal
- Region: Centro
- Intermunic. comm.: Viseu Dão Lafões
- District: Guarda
- Municipality: Aguiar da Beira

Area
  - Total: 11.2 km^{2} (4.3 sq mi)

Population (2001)
  - Total: 297
  - Density: 27/km^{2} (69/sq mi)
- Time zone: UTC+00:00 (WET)
  - Summer (DST): UTC+01:00 (WEST)

Sequeiros is a former freguesia ("civil parish") in Aguiar da Beira Municipality, Guarda District, Portugal. It was merged with Gradiz in 2013 to form the new freguesia Sequeiros e Gradiz.

== Demography ==
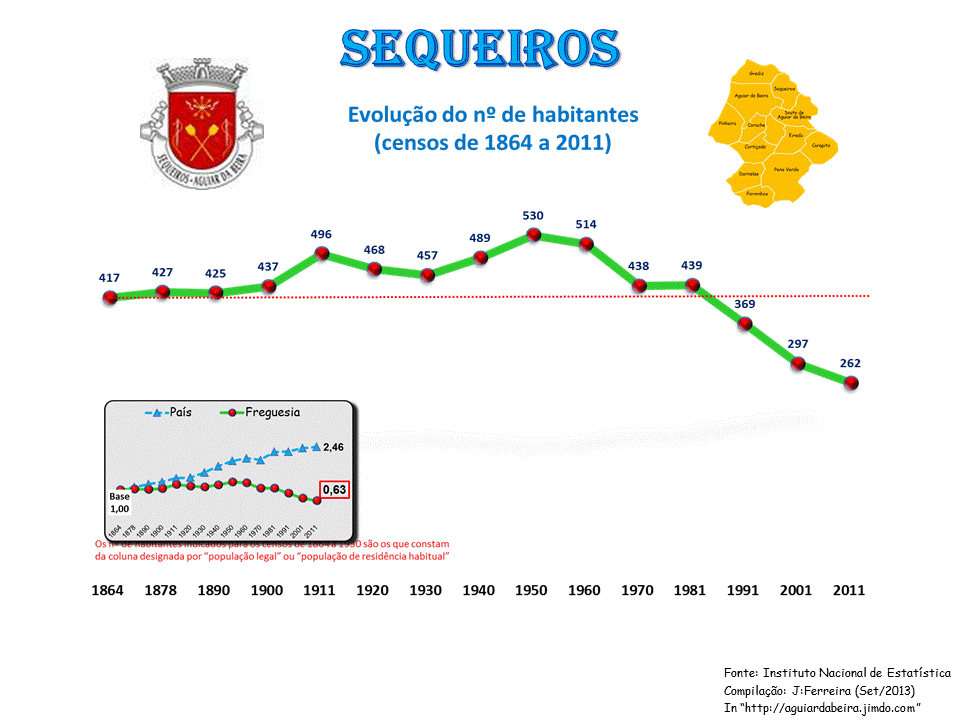
Population from 1864 to 2011

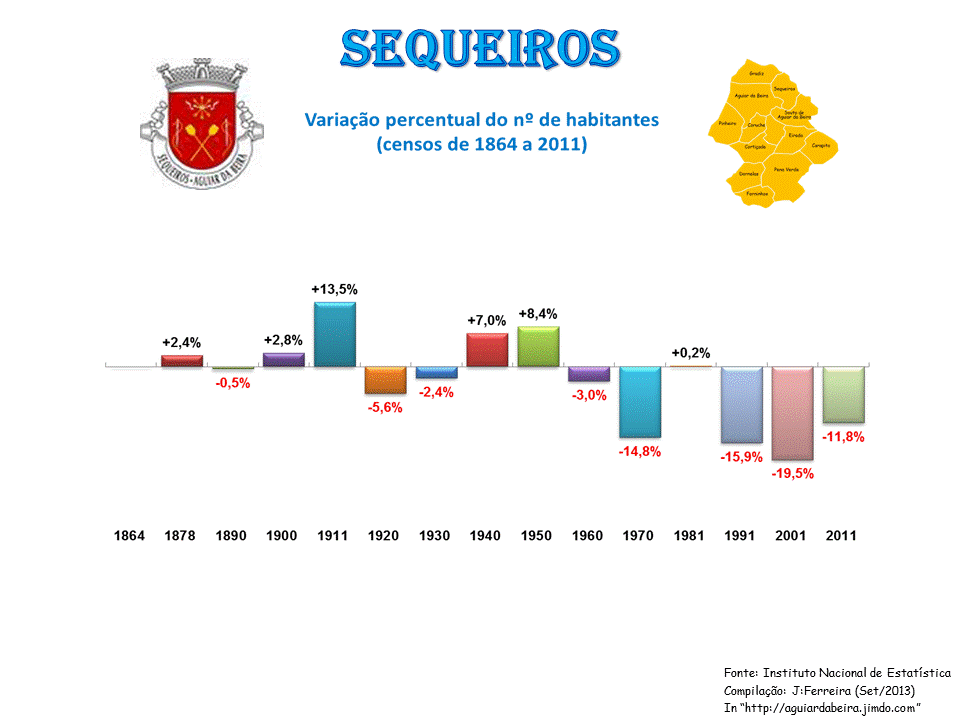
Population variation from 1864 to 2011
