= Souto de Aguiar da Beira =

- Civil parish
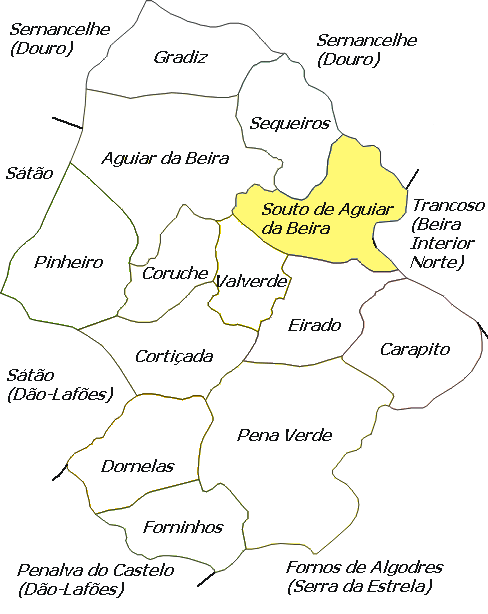
- Location of Souto de Aguiar da Beira in Aguiar da Beira Municipality
- Coordinates: 40°48′13″N 7°30′17″W
- Country: Portugal
- Region: Centro
- Intermunic. comm.: Viseu Dão Lafões
- District: Guarda
- Municipality: Aguiar da Beira

Area
  - Total: 14.8 km^{2} (5.7 sq mi)

Population (2001)
  - Total: 369
  - Density: 25/km^{2} (65/sq mi)
- Time zone: UTC+00:00 (WET)
  - Summer (DST): UTC+01:00 (WEST)

Souto de Aguiar da Beira is a former freguesia ("civil parish") in Aguiar da Beira Municipality, Guarda District, Portugal. It was merged with Valverde in 2013 to form the new freguesia Souto de Aguiar da Beira e Valverde.

== Demography ==
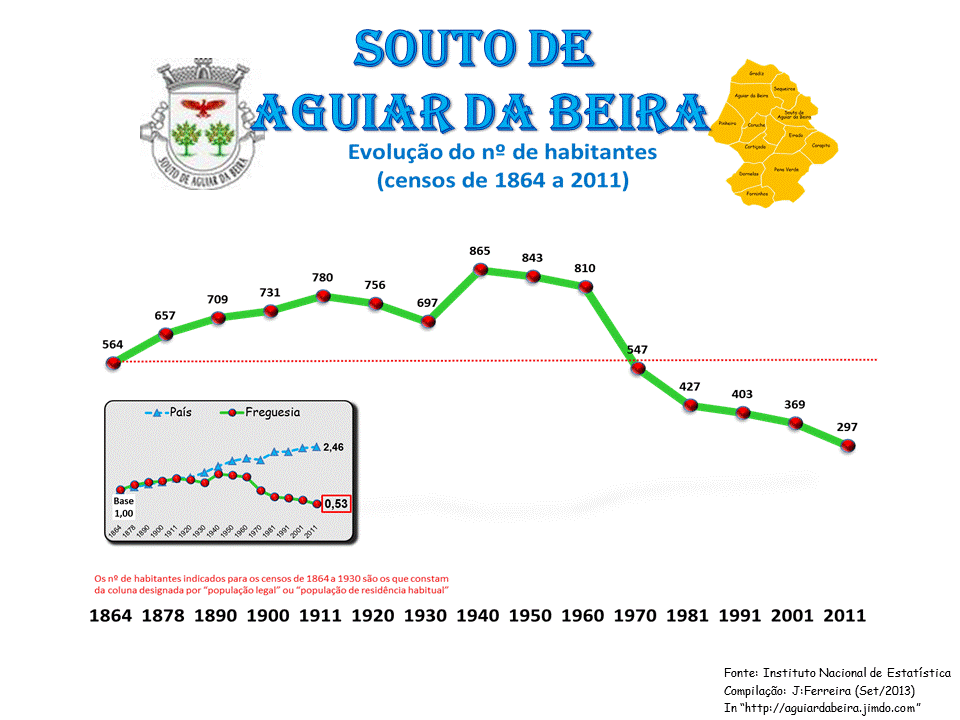
Population from 1864 to 2011

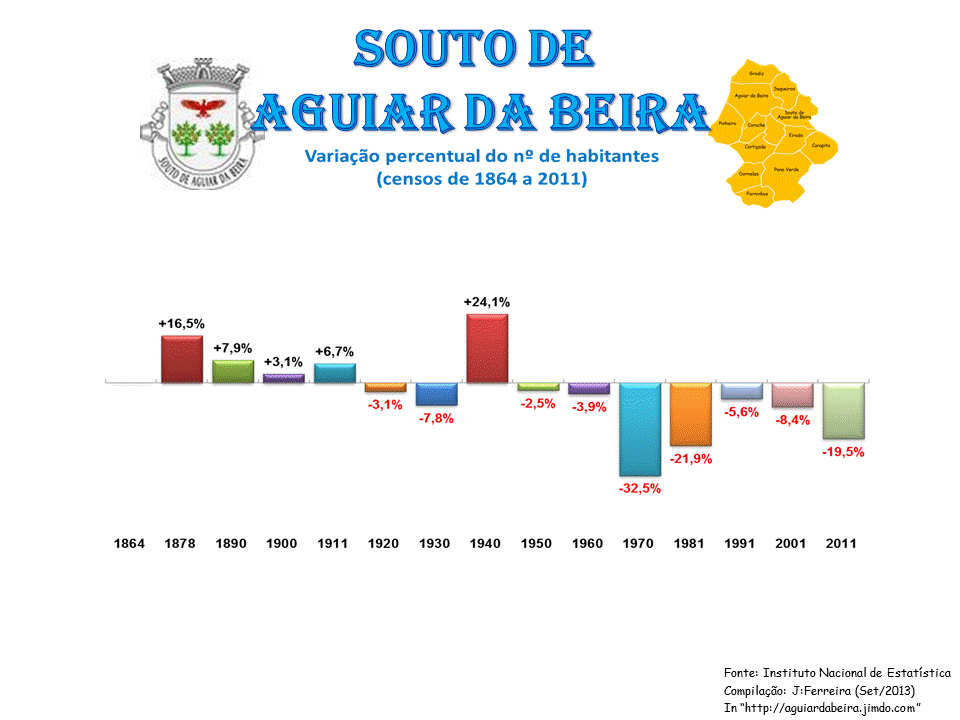
Population variation from 1864 to 2011
