= Valverde (Aguiar da Beira) =

- Civil parish
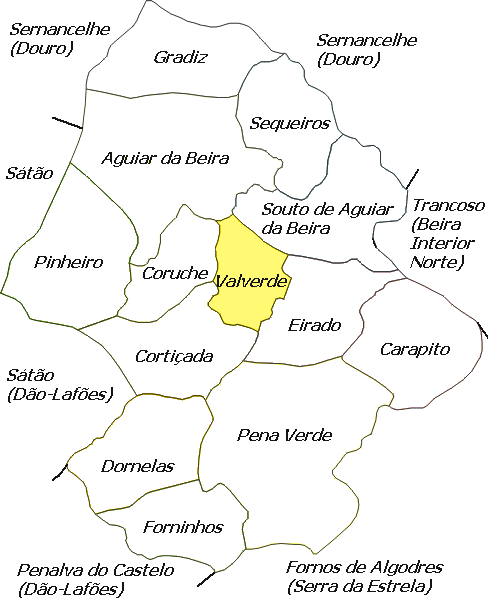
- Location of Valverde in Aguiar da Beira Municipality
- Coordinates: 40°47′03″N 7°31′19″W
- Country: Portugal
- Region: Centro
- Intermunic. comm.: Viseu Dão Lafões
- District: Guarda
- Municipality: Aguiar da Beira

Area
  - Total: 6.9 km^{2} (2.7 sq mi)

Population (2001)
  - Total: 203
  - Density: 29/km^{2} (76/sq mi)
- Time zone: UTC+00:00 (WET)
  - Summer (DST): UTC+01:00 (WEST)

Valverde is a former freguesia ("civil parish") in Aguiar da Beira Municipality, Guarda District, Portugal. It was merged with Souto de Aguiar da Beira in 2013 to form the new freguesia Souto de Aguiar da Beira e Valverde.

== Demography ==
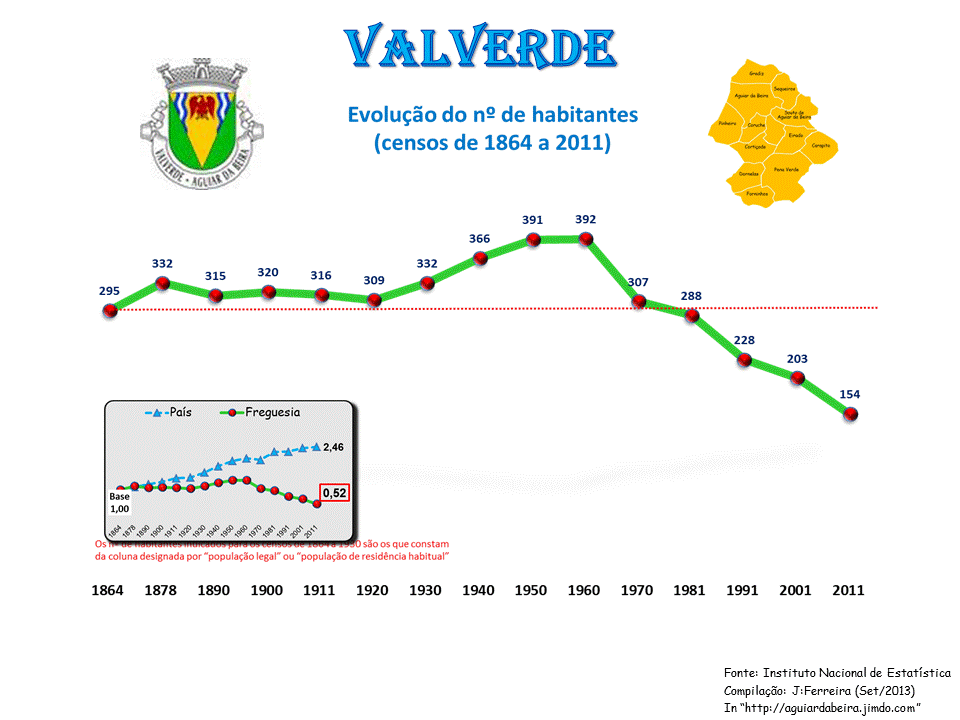
Population from 1864 to 2011

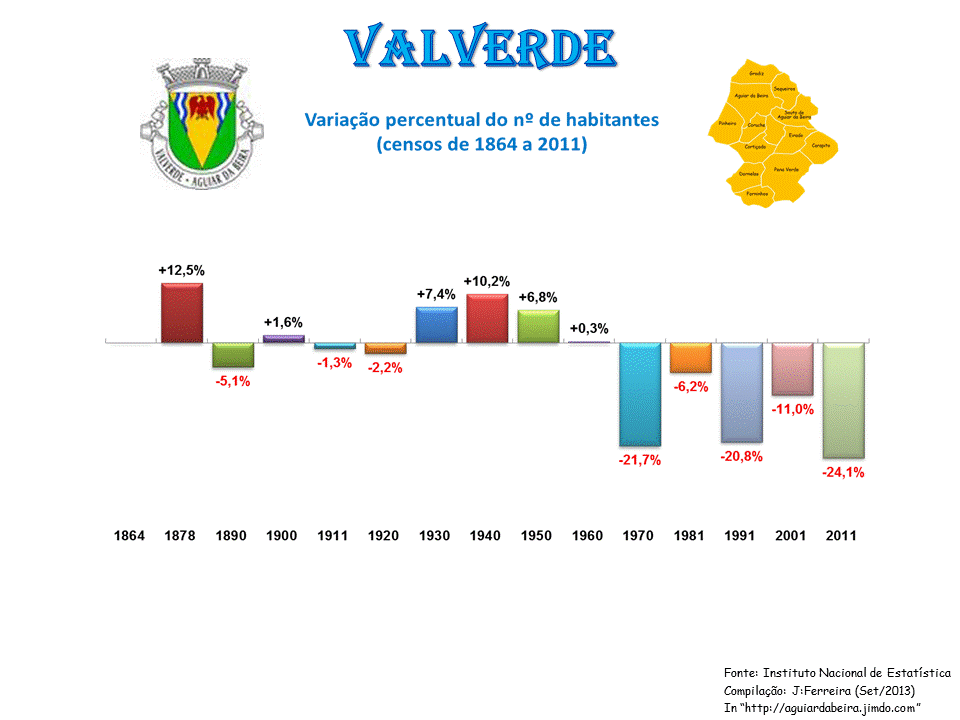
Population variation from 1864 to 2011

== Monuments ==
Igreja matriz de Valverde

Capela de Santo Antão

Fonte romana de Valverde
