= Dornelas =

Dornelas may refer to:

== Portugal ==
- Dornelas (Aguiar da Beira), a civil parish in the municipality of Aguiar da Beira
- Dornelas (Amares), a civil parish in the municipality of Amares
- Dornelas (Boticas), a civil parish in the municipality of Boticas
- Dornelas (Sever do Vouga), a civil parish in the municipality of Sever do Vouga
