= Dolmen of Carapito I =

Dolmen in Carapito, Portugal

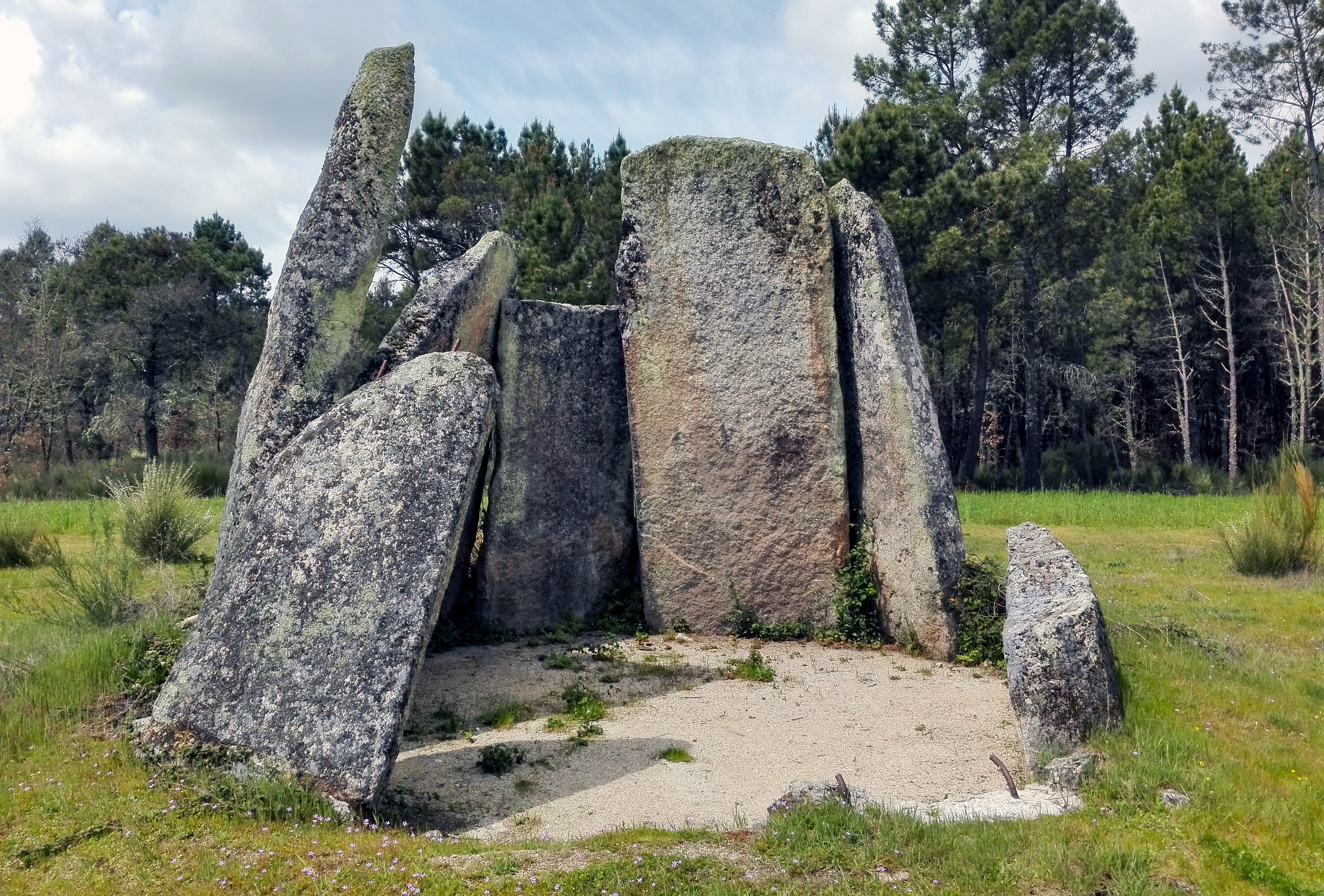
- The dolmen in 2019
- Interactive map of Dolmen of Carapito I
- 40°45′3.4″N 7°27′51.1″W
- Type: Dolmen
- Location: Guarda, Portugal

History
- Built: c. 2900 BC

Site notes
- Material: Stone
- Elevation: 651 m (2,136 ft)
- Owner: Portugal
- Public access: Private EC583 in the direction of Queiriz, on the western margin of the Ribeira do Carapito

Dolmen of Carapito I (Portuguese: Anta de Carapito I) is a megalithic monument located in the civil parish of Carapito, in the municipality of Aguiar da Beira in the Guarda District of Portugal.

== History ==
The dolmen was constructed during the Megalithic period, around 2900 BC.

The first explorations of the site were completed by J. Coelho, who collected ceramic fragments. At the time, the ceiling was discovered caved-in, and the pillar to the south broken and fallen, that occurred sometime at the beginning of the 20th century. The southern pillar, near the opening and the northern pillar by the master stone were also intact, although a pillar was crossed within the interior chamber.

In 1955, Irisalva Moita visited the site, encountering a ruined structure, even as the ceiling remained intact.

Excavations by Vera Leisner and Leonel Ribeiro were undertaken in 1966. At that time, the southern pillar at the entranceway and the first and second pillars to the north had fallen. During the dig, the team discovered stones from the ceiling, as well as two pillars with solar or serpentine carvings. The fragmentation of the pillars were associated with tectonic movements, rather than human intervention. Radiocarbon dating of the artefacts unearthed on the site were undertaken on coarse pottery, microliths and flint blades, shale beads and calaite. At another level of the chamber, there were encountered blades and lamellae.

The IPPC Serviços de Arquelogia da Zona Centro (Centro Zone Archaeological Services) intervened at the site in 1988, with archaeological excavations under the direction of Raquel Vilaça. This led to the 1990 work to consolidate the site, including supporting two pillars with iron and cement, drainage to the north pillar and repairing fragments that were encountered spread in the surrounding area.

== Architecture ==
Located near Guarda, the dolmen is located in a rural landscape, isolated on the western margin of the Ribeira do Carapito, encircled to the north by pine-trees. The structure was part of three dolmens encountered and explored by V. Leisner and L. Ribeiro in the civil parish of Carapito in 1966.

Carapito I is the type of megalithic dolmen characterised by I. Moita as a simple structure with a ten-sided polygonal chamber without a corridor, facing the northwest. The pillars or stone sheets are about 3.5 metres (11 ft) height and 2.3 metres (7.5 ft) medium width. Alongside the ravine is the 3.5–3.8 metres (11–12 ft) "ceiling" of the dolmen. To the south, is the main slab and four pillars, with the first alongside the entranceway, fractured (but consolidated with iron and cement). Peninsular, constituting a reduction in chamber dolmens and developed corridor. However, the variant most characteristic of Beira is the dolmen polygonal chamber with short or incipient corridor, like the Carapito III and IV dolmens. Carapito I is a large dolmen with two pillars decorated with solar and serpentine motifs. It is largely fragmented, but partially reconstituted, situated on fertile soil, indicating the existence of an agrarian community.
