= Coruche (Aguiar da Beira) =

- Civil parish
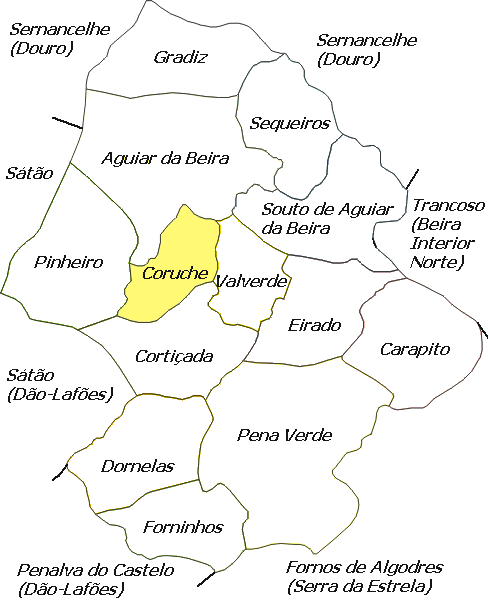
- Location of Coruche in Aguiar da Beira Municipality
- Coordinates: 40°47′37″N 7°33′27″W
- Country: Portugal
- Region: Centro
- Intermunic. comm.: Viseu Dão Lafões
- District: Guarda
- Municipality: Aguiar da Beira

Area
  - Total: 7.6 km^{2} (2.9 sq mi)

Population (2001)
  - Total: 208
  - Density: 27/km^{2} (71/sq mi)
- Time zone: UTC+00:00 (WET)
  - Summer (DST): UTC+01:00 (WEST)

Coruche is a former freguesia in Aguiar da Beira Municipality, Guarda District, Portugal. It was merged with Aguiar da Beira in 2013 to form the new freguesia Aguiar da Beira e Coruche. The Portucalense Bridge over the River Coja is located in this former freguesia.

== Demography ==
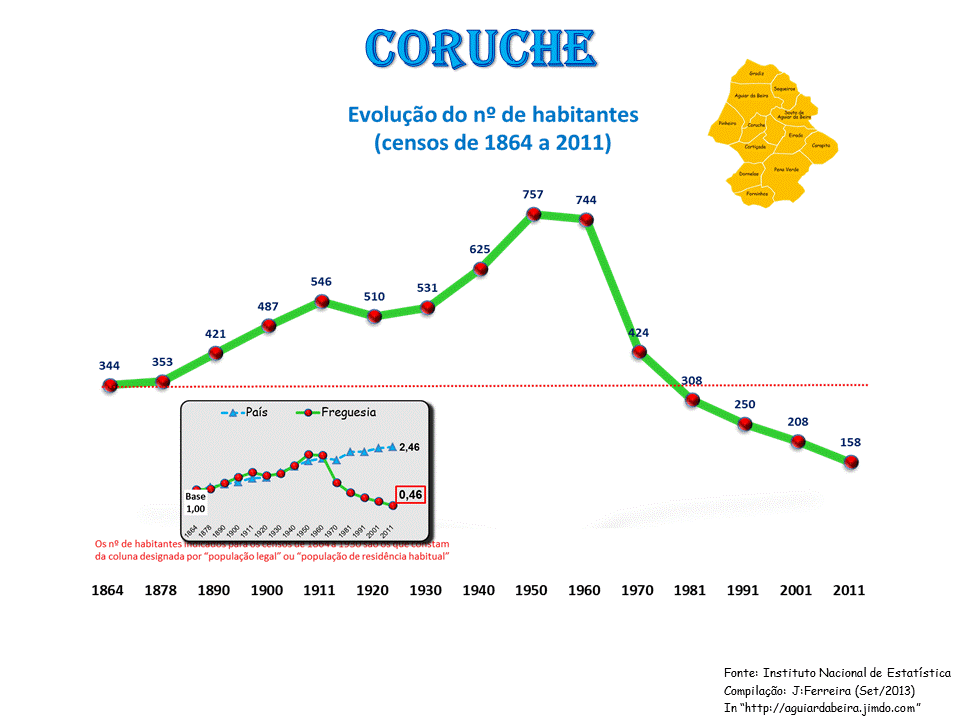
Population from 1864 to 2011

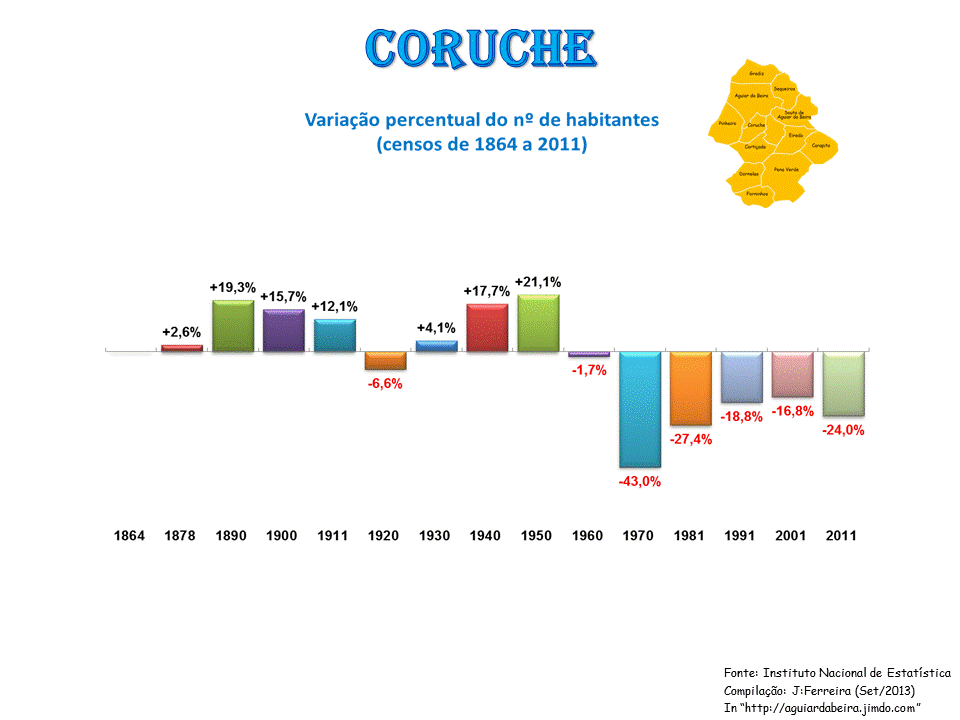
Population variation from 1864 to 2011
