= Pillory of Aguiar da Beira =

- Pelourinho de Aguiar da Beira
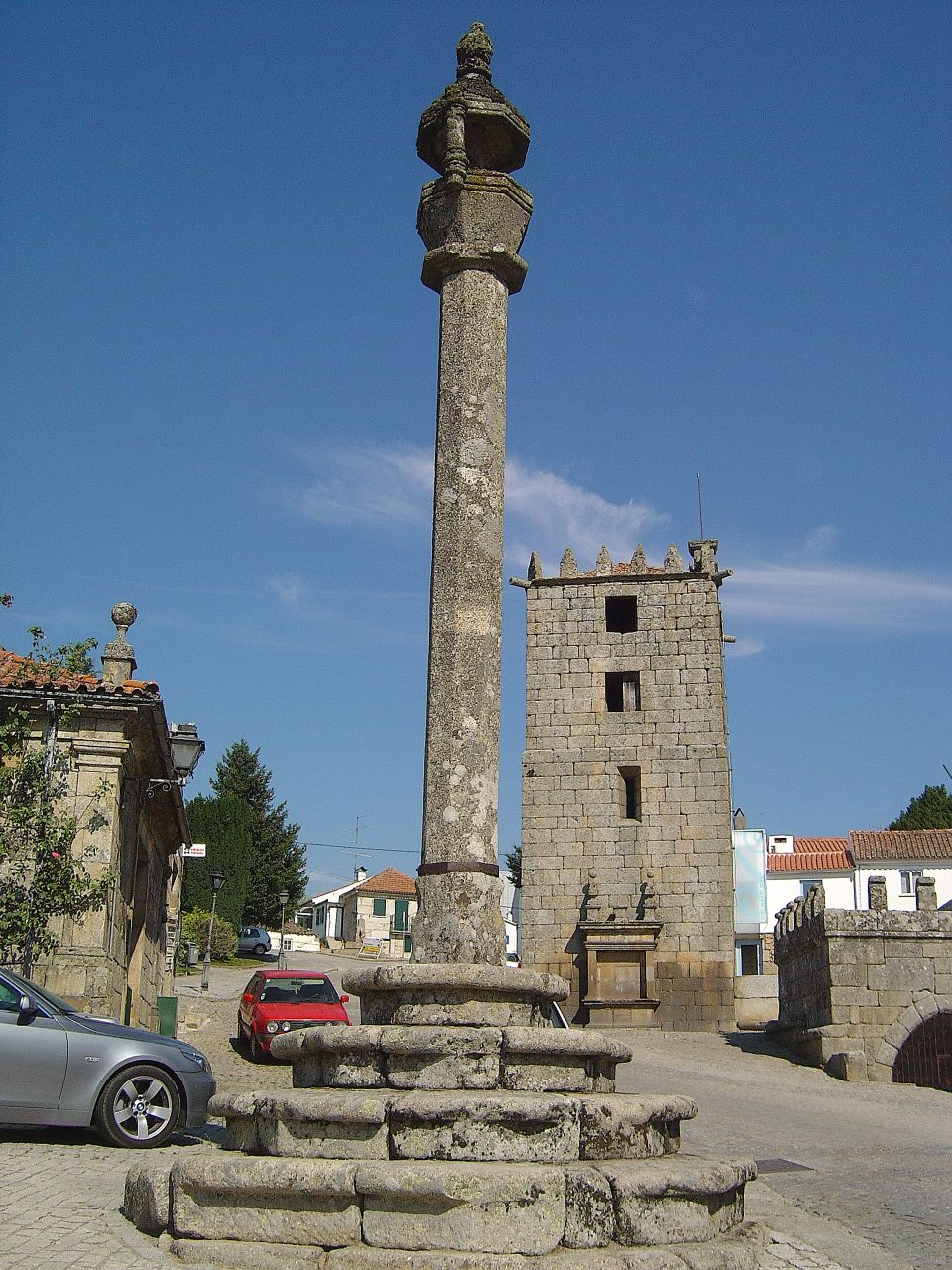
- A view of the pillory in the Largo dos Monumentos Nacionais
- Interactive map of the Pillory of Aguiar da Beira area

General information
- Type: Pillory
- Architectural style: Manueline
- Location: Aguiar da Beira e Coruche, Portugal
- Coordinates: 40°48′58.7″N 7°32′42.1″W
- Opened: 1120
- Owner: Portuguese Republic

Technical details
- Material: Granite

The Pillory of Aguiar da Beira (Portuguese: Pelourinho de Aguiar da Beira) is a pillory located in the civil parish of Aguiar da Beira e Coruche, in the municipality of Aguiar da Beira, Portuguese district of Guarda.

== History ==
In 1120, either D. Teresa or Afonso Henriques issued a foral (charter) for the territory. This administrative title was reformed in 1258 under the reign of D. Afonso III.

But in 1512, King D. Manuel I renewed the foral, at the same time that pillory was installed or re-installed.

By 1708, the settlement had 160 neighbours, and was likely in the possession of the Order of Christ. In the 4 June 1758 Memórias Paroquiais, the parish priest José Cardoso das Neves, referred to Aguiar da Beira as a possession of the Casa do Infantado, under the title of the Infante D. Pedro. By that time, it supported two judges, three representatives and prosecutor, as well as a population of 159 residents.

In 1896, the municipality was extinguished and its territory integrated into Trancoso.

The municipality was reestablished in 1989.

== Architecture ==
The pillory is situated in the middle of the principal square, between the Rua da Misericórdia, Rua Direita, Rua de Baixo and Rua do Castanheiro. The old square, central to the historic part of the town, is dominated by various important architectural structures, dating to as early as the Middle Ages. Erected close by is important tower and simple fountain (from the 14th century), the manorhouse Casa dos Magistrados (15th century) and former Casa da Câmara (the 18th century municipal hall), resulting in the square being known as the Largo dos Monumentos (square of the monuments). Along with the pillory, the Torre Ameada and Fonte Ameada have been classified as Monumentos Nacionais (National Monument).

The granite structure is supported on a four-step octagonal base with lip, from which rises an octagonal column on square, beveled base, with an iron ring half-way up its height. The capital is decorated with subsectional ring and topped by a cage, with the lower part in shape of an inverted and truncated pyramid with rings. The hat-shaped inverted octagonal pyramid, with the base decorated with incised rings and crowned by armillary sphere. The base and the capital decorated by rings and half spheres.
