= Cortiçada =

- Civil parish
- Location in Portugal
- Coordinates: 40.765°N 7.542°W
- Country: Portugal
- Region: Centro
- Intermunic. comm.: Viseu Dão Lafões
- District: Guarda
- Municipality: Aguiar da Beira

Area
  - Total: 12.65 km^{2} (4.88 sq mi)

Population (2011)
  - Total: 341
  - Density: 27/km^{2} (70/sq mi)
- Time zone: UTC+00:00 (WET)
  - Summer (DST): UTC+01:00 (WEST)

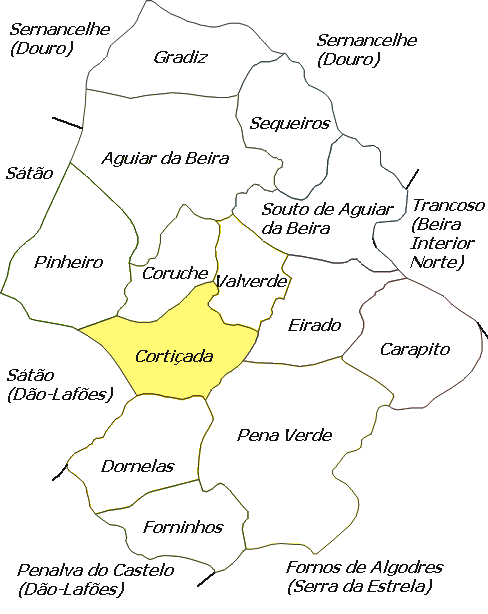
Location within the municipality

Cortiçada is a freguesia in Aguiar da Beira Municipality, Guarda District, Portugal. The population in 2011 was 341, in an area of 12.65 km^{2}.

== Demography ==
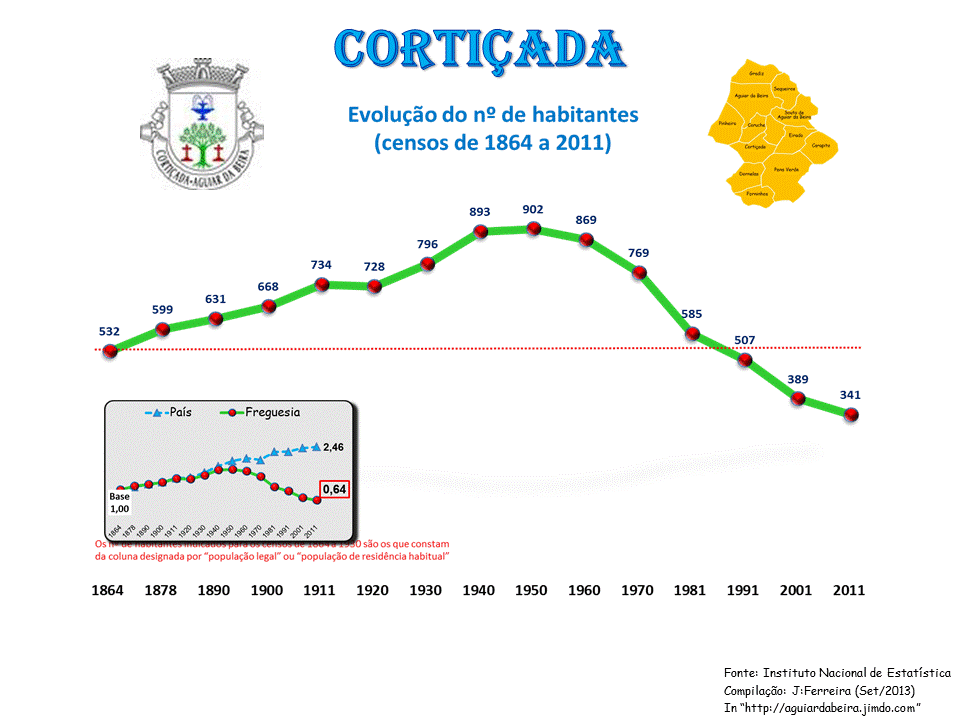
Population from 1864 to 2011

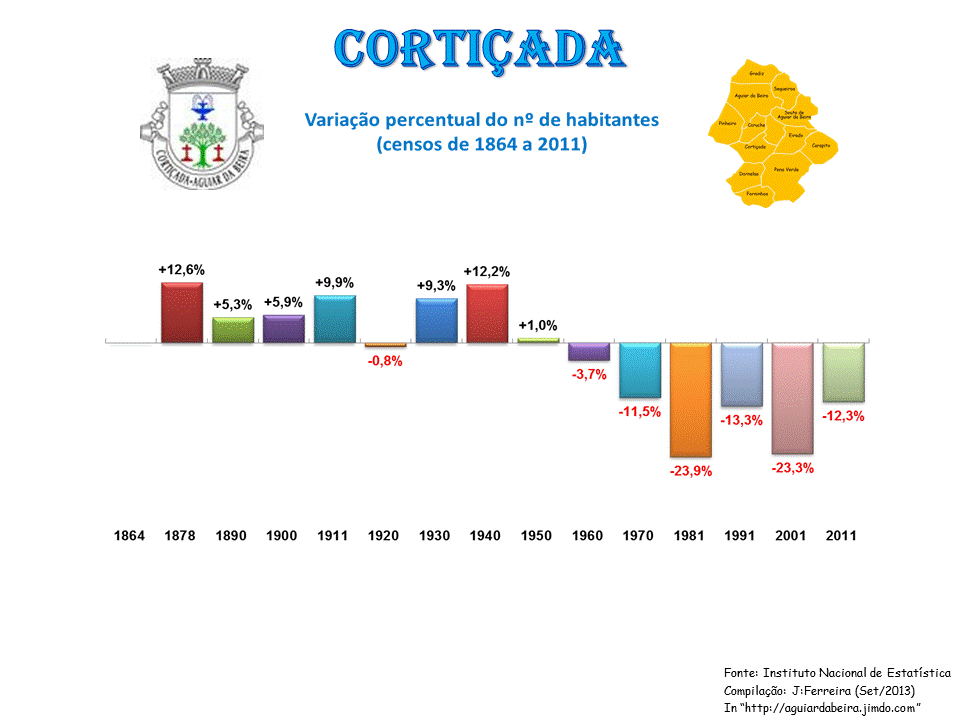
Population variation from 1864 to 2011
