= Irisalva Moita =

Portuguese archaeologist and museologist

- Born: Irisalva Constância de Nóbrega Nunes Moita; 21 May 1924; Sá da Bandeira, Portuguese Angola
- Died: 13 June 2009 (Aged 85); Lisbon, Portugal
- Occupation(s): Archaeologist and museologist
- Known for: Contribution to the expansion of the Museum of Lisbon
- Parent(s): José Nunes Moita and Justina de Nóbrega

Irisalva Moita (1924–2009) was a Portuguese archaeologist and museum conservator and curator.

== Early life ==
Irisalva Constância de Nóbrega Nunes Moita was born on 21 May 1924, in Sá da Bandeira (now Lubango), Portuguese Angola. When she was 20 she moved to the Portuguese capital of Lisbon to pursue her studies. There she graduated in 1949 in Historical and Philosophical Sciences. One of her first interests was in archaeology and from the early 1950s, she obtained a research scholarship from the archaeology section of the Instituto de Alta Cultura (High Culture Institute), a body set up by the Ministry of Education of the authoritarian Estado Novo regime to develop and improve artistic culture, scientific research and cultural relations with other countries, as well as to disseminate the Portuguese language and culture. The scholarship would last two decades, with Moita being involved in several archaeological investigations and excavations, beginning with a study of the Portuguese dolmen culture, such as the Dolmen of Cunha Baixa near Viseu and the Dolmen of Carapito I in the Guarda District, as well as other sites in the Alentejo region.

== Archaeological studies in Lisbon ==
Moita then carried out a detailed study of the Castro culture, a period in Portugal generally considered to cover from the 9th century BCE to the 1st century BCE when the Romans overwhelmed the country. From the mid-1950s her interests would focus increasingly on the capital, from the Roman period, when it was known as Olisipo, to more or less the present day. Her role in archaeology in Lisbon was necessitated by the increase in building work, such as that for the Lisbon Metro, which began in 1955. She was frequently involved in protecting infrastructure and artefacts about to be destroyed by site works. Over time she would become internationally known as an expert on urban preservation. Her excavations included those at the Monsanto Forest Park, the Lisbon Roman theatre, the Hospital Real de Todos-os-Santos of Praça da Figueira, and the Roman necropolis in the same area.

== Museum of Lisbon ==
Throughout the 1950s Moita also taught at the Faculty of Arts of the University of Lisbon and took a course to become a Museum Conservator. In 1958 she joined the Museum of Lisbon network of six museums, becoming Chief Conservator from 1970 to 1994. She became a specialist in Olisipography, the study of writings connected with Lisbon, notably regarding the city's historical and urban development. She became particularly interested in the Portuguese caricaturist and owner of a ceramics factory, Rafael Bordalo Pinheiro, and published many articles on him and the characters of his time. She also curated many exhibitions, including on the Cult of St. Anthony in Lisbon; the Marquis of Pombal, held on the bicentenary of his death; Fifteenth Century Lisbon – The image and life in the city, an exhibition about the people of Lisbon, their environment, ways of life, entertainment and mentality; Azulejo tiles of Lisbon; Faiences of Rafael Bordalo Pinheiro; and the water supply in the time of D. João V. In addition to the exhibition catalogues, her work included the coordination of O Livro de Lisboa (The Book of Lisbon), prepared for Lisbon's Expo '98, to which she also contributed two articles.

In 1973/75, Moita outlined a new structure for the Museum of Lisbon, which proposed a chronological and evolutionary approach to the city's development. She oversaw the expansion of the museum from the relatively small museum that she joined to the multi-locational museum of the present day, with a rapid expansion in the collection.

== Later life ==
Her interest in her work continued until the end of her life: she would walk through Lisbon on a constant look out for any likely destruction of the city's heritage, such as demolitions of old tiles or classified stonework, which she would then denounce. In 2005, she was awarded the rank of Grand Officer of the Order of Prince Henry (Ordem do Infante Dom Henrique) by the Portuguese President. In 2008, Lisbon City Council awarded her the city's medal of honour, in recognition of her work in developing the municipal museums. Irisalva Moita died on the 13th of June, 2009. Following her instructions, however, her death was not announced until the 23rd of that month.
