= Pena Verde =

- Civil parish
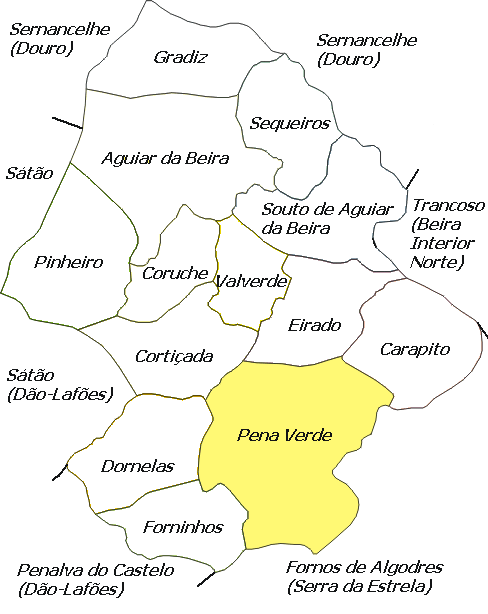
- Coordinates: 40.728°N 7.505°W
- Country: Portugal
- Region: Centro
- Intermunic. comm.: Viseu Dão Lafões
- District: Guarda
- Municipality: Aguiar da Beira

Area
  - Total: 29.40 km^{2} (11.35 sq mi)

Population (2011)
  - Total: 813
  - Density: 28/km^{2} (72/sq mi)
- Time zone: UTC+00:00 (WET)
  - Summer (DST): UTC+01:00 (WEST)

Pena Verde is a freguesia in Aguiar da Beira Municipality, Guarda District, Portugal. The population in 2011 was 813, in an area of 29.40 km^{2}. The Pillory of Pena Verde is located in this freguesia.

== Demography ==
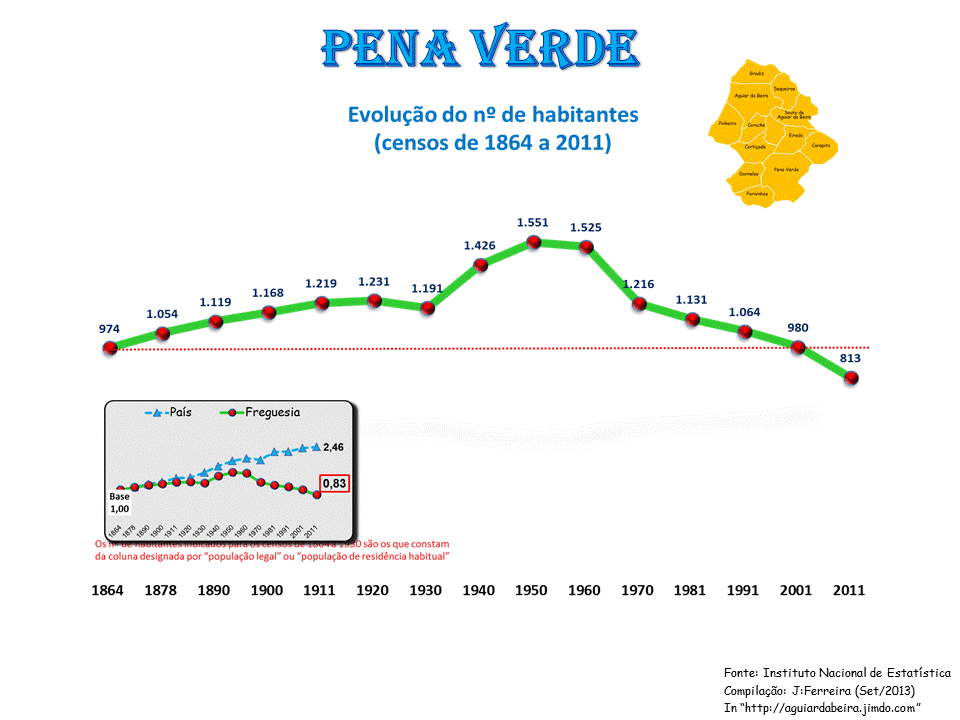
Population from 1864 to 2011
