= Carapito =

- Civil parish
- Location in Portugal
- Coordinates: 40.764°N 7.464°W
- Country: Portugal
- Region: Centro
- Intermunic. comm.: Viseu Dão Lafões
- District: Guarda
- Municipality: Aguiar da Beira

Area
  - Total: 17.26 km^{2} (6.66 sq mi)

Population (2011)
  - Total: 442
  - Density: 26/km^{2} (66/sq mi)
- Time zone: UTC+00:00 (WET)
  - Summer (DST): UTC+01:00 (WEST)

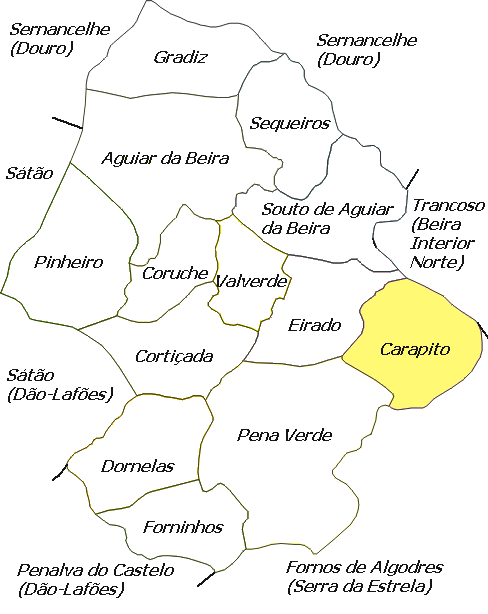
Location within the municipality

Carapito is a freguesia in Aguiar da Beira Municipality, Guarda District, Portugal. The population in 2011 was 442, in an area of 17.26 km^{2}. The Dolmen of Carapito I is located in this freguesia.

== Demography ==
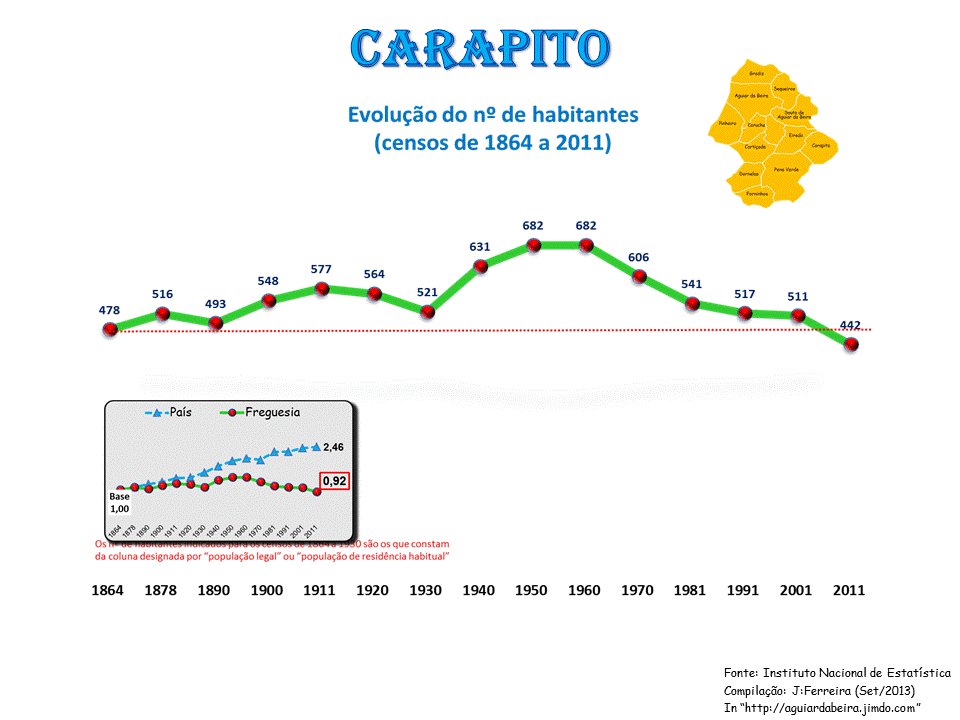
Population from 1864 to 2011

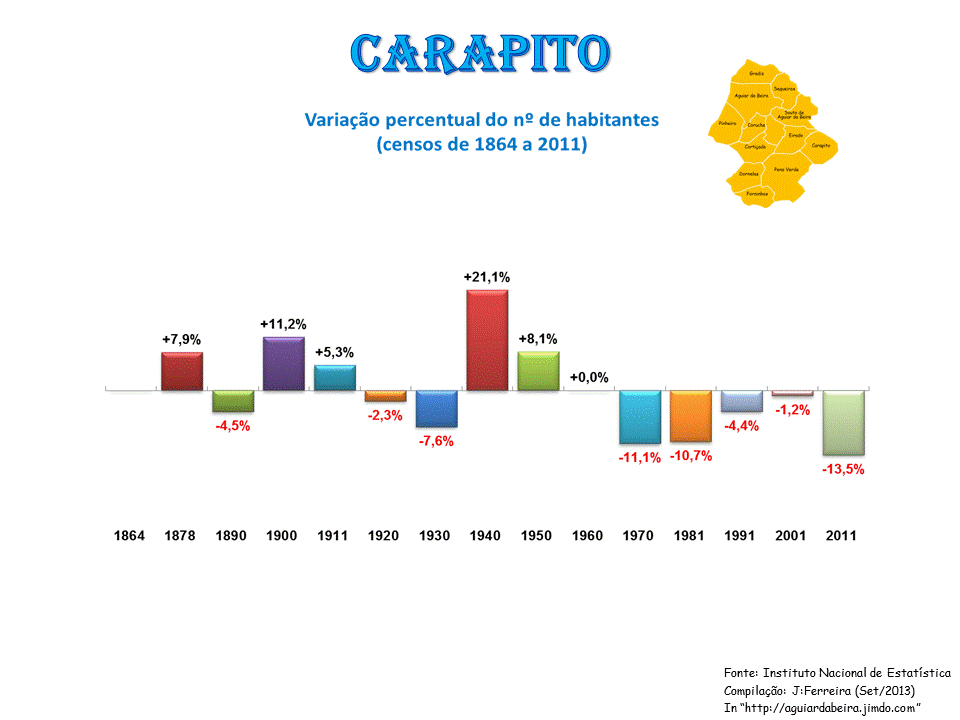
Population variation from 1864 to 2011
