= Sequeiros e Gradiz =

- Civil parish
- Location in Portugal
- Coordinates: 40.839°N 7.509°W
- Country: Portugal
- Region: Centro
- Intermunic. comm.: Viseu Dão Lafões
- District: Guarda
- Municipality: Aguiar da Beira

Area
  - Total: 23.92 km^{2} (9.24 sq mi)

Population (2011)
  - Total: 421
  - Density: 17.6/km^{2} (45.6/sq mi)
- Time zone: UTC+00:00 (WET)
  - Summer (DST): UTC+01:00 (WEST)

Sequeiros e Gradiz is a civil parish in the municipality of Aguiar da Beira, Portugal. It was formed in 2013 by the merger of the former parishes Sequeiros and Gradiz. The population in 2011 was 421, in an area of 23.92 km^{2}.
