= Souto de Aguiar da Beira e Valverde =

- Civil parish
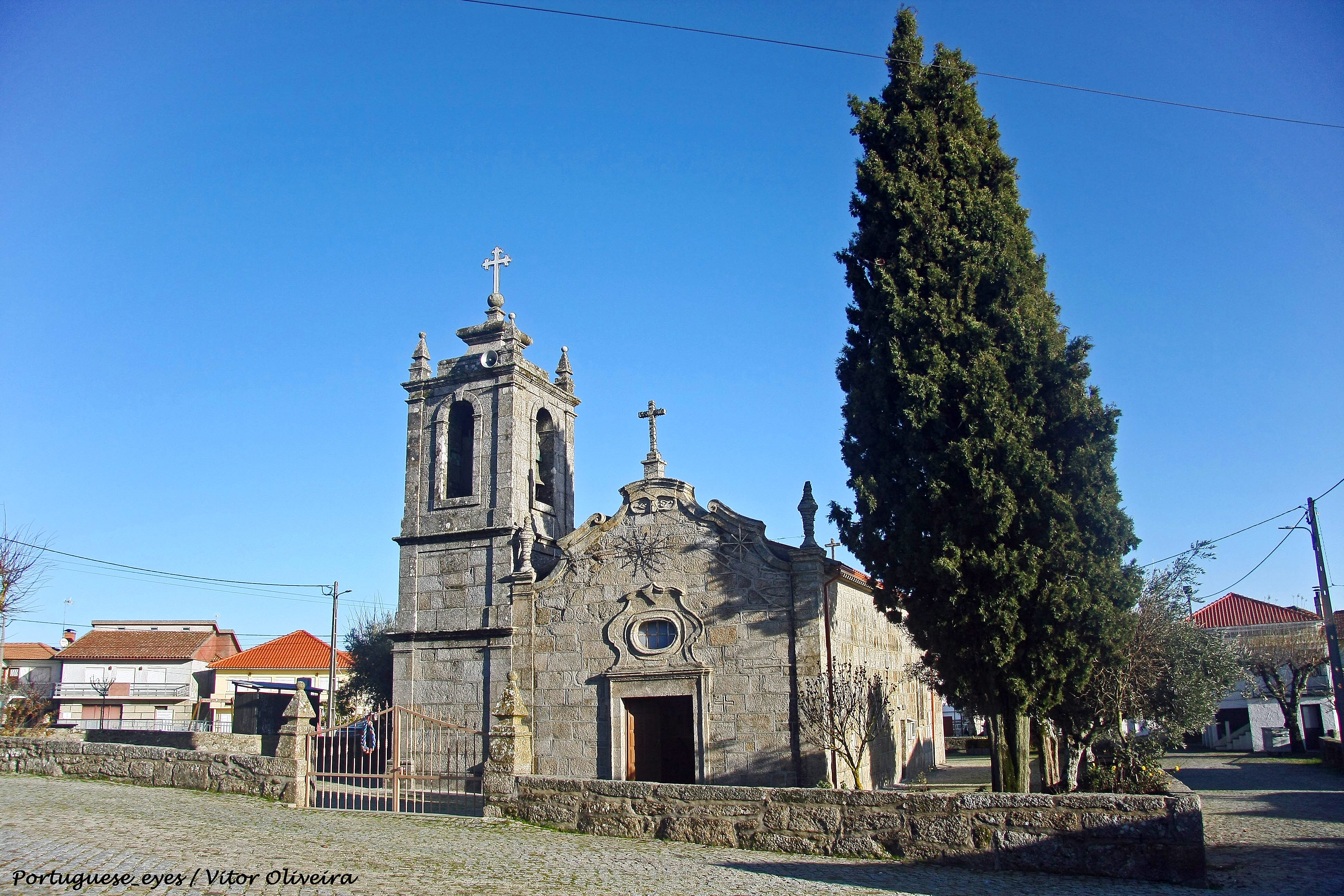

- Location in Portugal
- Coordinates: 40.803°N 7.504°W
- Country: Portugal
- Region: Centro
- Intermunic. comm.: Viseu Dão Lafões
- District: Guarda
- Municipality: Aguiar da Beira

Area
  - Total: 21.68 km^{2} (8.37 sq mi)

Population (2011)
  - Total: 451
  - Density: 20.8/km^{2} (53.9/sq mi)
- Time zone: UTC+00:00 (WET)
  - Summer (DST): UTC+01:00 (WEST)

Souto de Aguiar da Beira e Valverde is a civil parish in the municipality of Aguiar da Beira, Portugal. It was formed in 2013 by the merger of the former parishes Souto de Aguiar da Beira and Valverde. The population in 2011 was 451, in an area of 21.68 km^{2}.
