= Pinheiro (Aguiar da Beira) =

- Civil parish
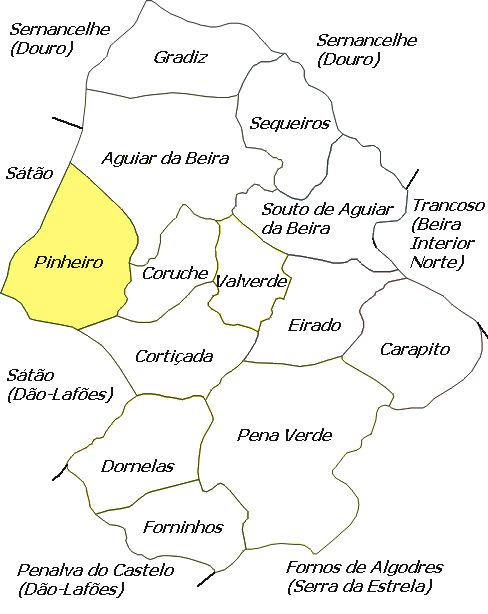
- Coordinates: 40.801°N 7.598°W
- Country: Portugal
- Region: Centro
- Intermunic. comm.: Viseu Dão Lafões
- District: Guarda
- Municipality: Aguiar da Beira

Area
  - Total: 15.88 km^{2} (6.13 sq mi)

Population (2011)
  - Total: 232
  - Density: 15/km^{2} (38/sq mi)
- Time zone: UTC+00:00 (WET)
  - Summer (DST): UTC+01:00 (WEST)

Pena Verde is a freguesia ("civil parish") in Aguiar da Beira Municipality, Guarda District, Portugal. The population in 2011 was 232, in an area of 15.88 km^{2}.

== Demography ==
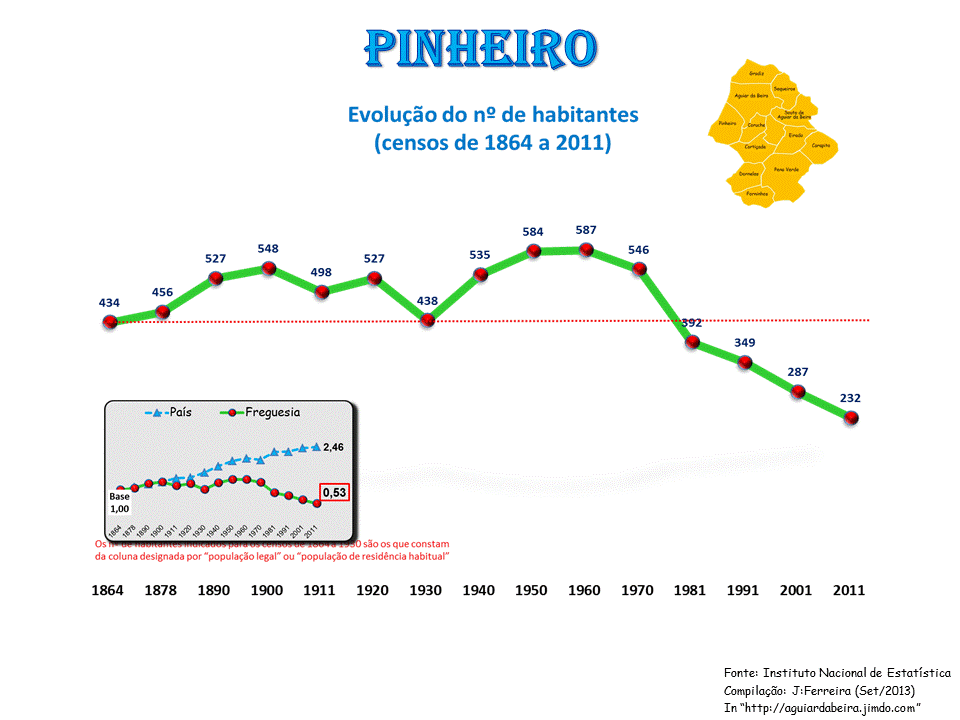
Population from 1864 to 2011

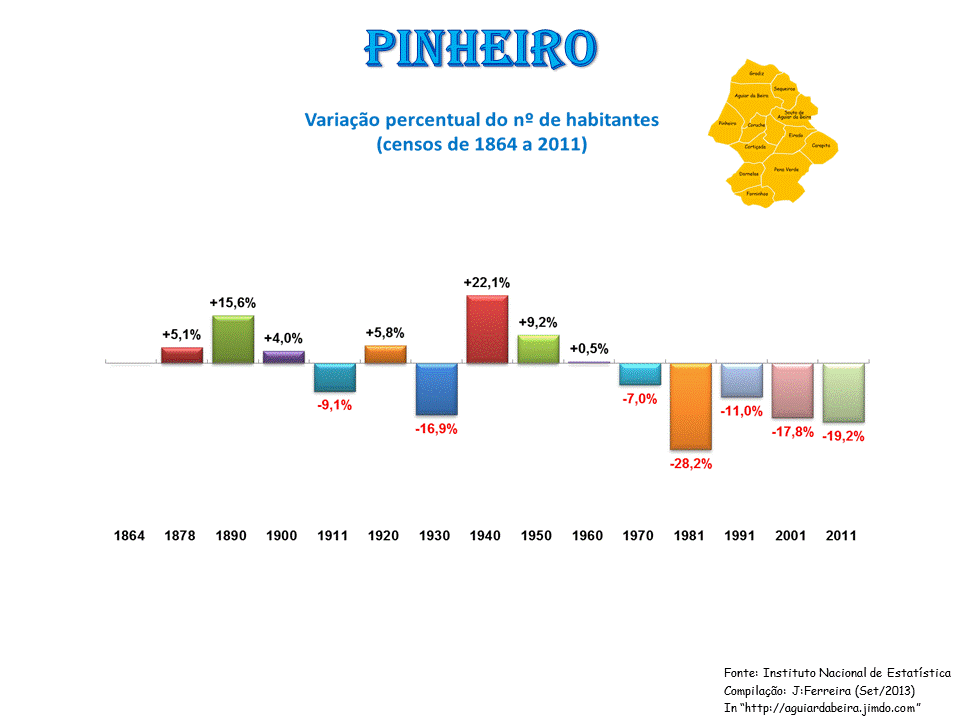
Population variation from 1864 to 2011
