= Dornelas (Aguiar da Beira) =

- Civil parish
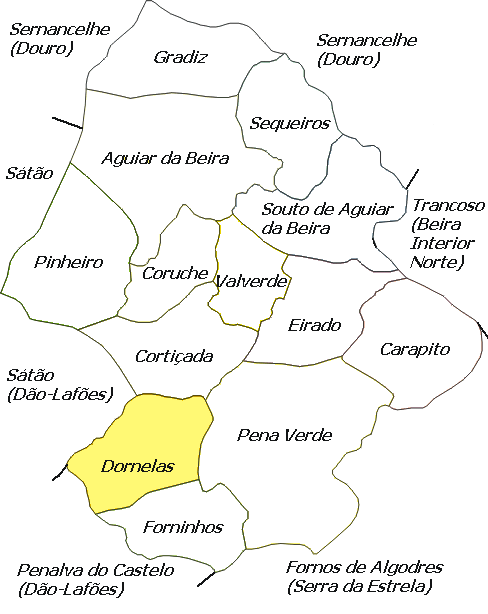
- Coordinates: 40.732°N 7.558°W
- Country: Portugal
- Region: Centro
- Intermunic. comm.: Viseu Dão Lafões
- District: Guarda
- Municipality: Aguiar da Beira

Area
  - Total: 23.75 km^{2} (9.17 sq mi)

Population (2011)
  - Total: 690
  - Density: 29/km^{2} (75/sq mi)
- Time zone: UTC+00:00 (WET)
  - Summer (DST): UTC+01:00 (WEST)

Dornelas is a freguesia in Aguiar da Beira Municipality, Guarda District, Portugal. The population in 2011 was 690, in an area of 23.75 km^{2}.

== Demography ==
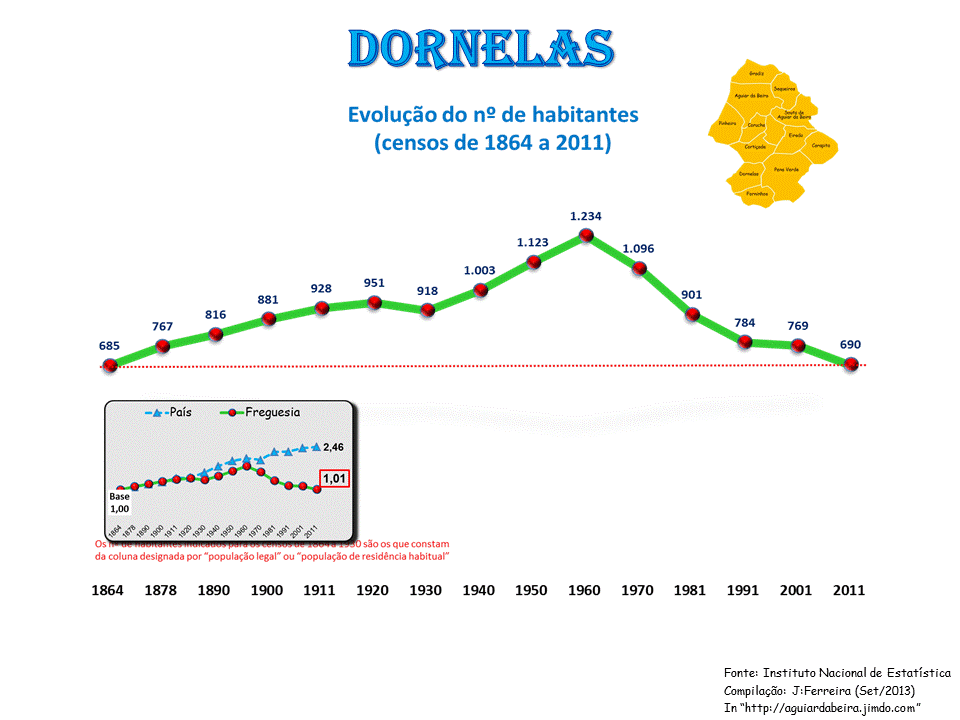
Population from 1864 to 2011

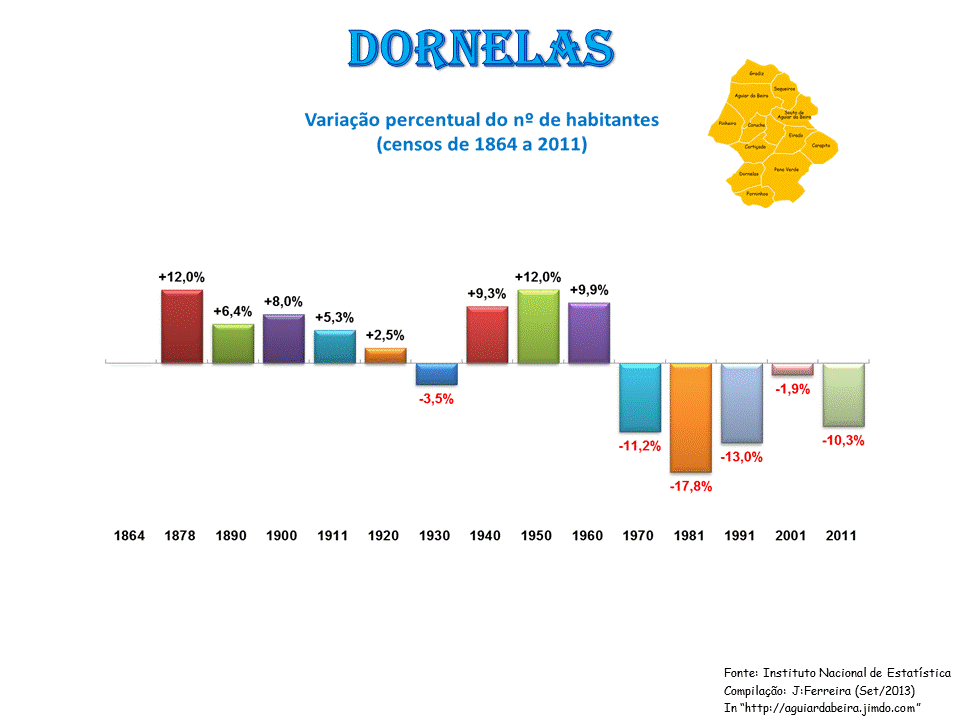
Population variation from 1864 to 2011
