= Aguiar da Beira e Coruche =

- Civil parish
- Location in Portugal
- Coordinates: 40.818°N 7.544°W
- Country: Portugal
- Region: Centro
- Intermunic. comm.: Viseu Dão Lafões
- District: Guarda
- Municipality: Aguiar da Beira

Area
  - Total: 43.36 km^{2} (16.74 sq mi)

Population (2011)
  - Total: 1,631
  - Density: 38/km^{2} (97/sq mi)
- Time zone: UTC+00:00 (WET)
  - Summer (DST): UTC+01:00 (WEST)

Aguiar da Beira e Coruche is a civil parish in the municipality of Aguiar da Beira, Portugal. It was formed in 2013 by the merger of the former parishes Aguiar da Beira and Coruche. The population in 2011 was 1,631, in an area of 43.36 km^{2}.
