= Aguiar da Beira =

- Municipality
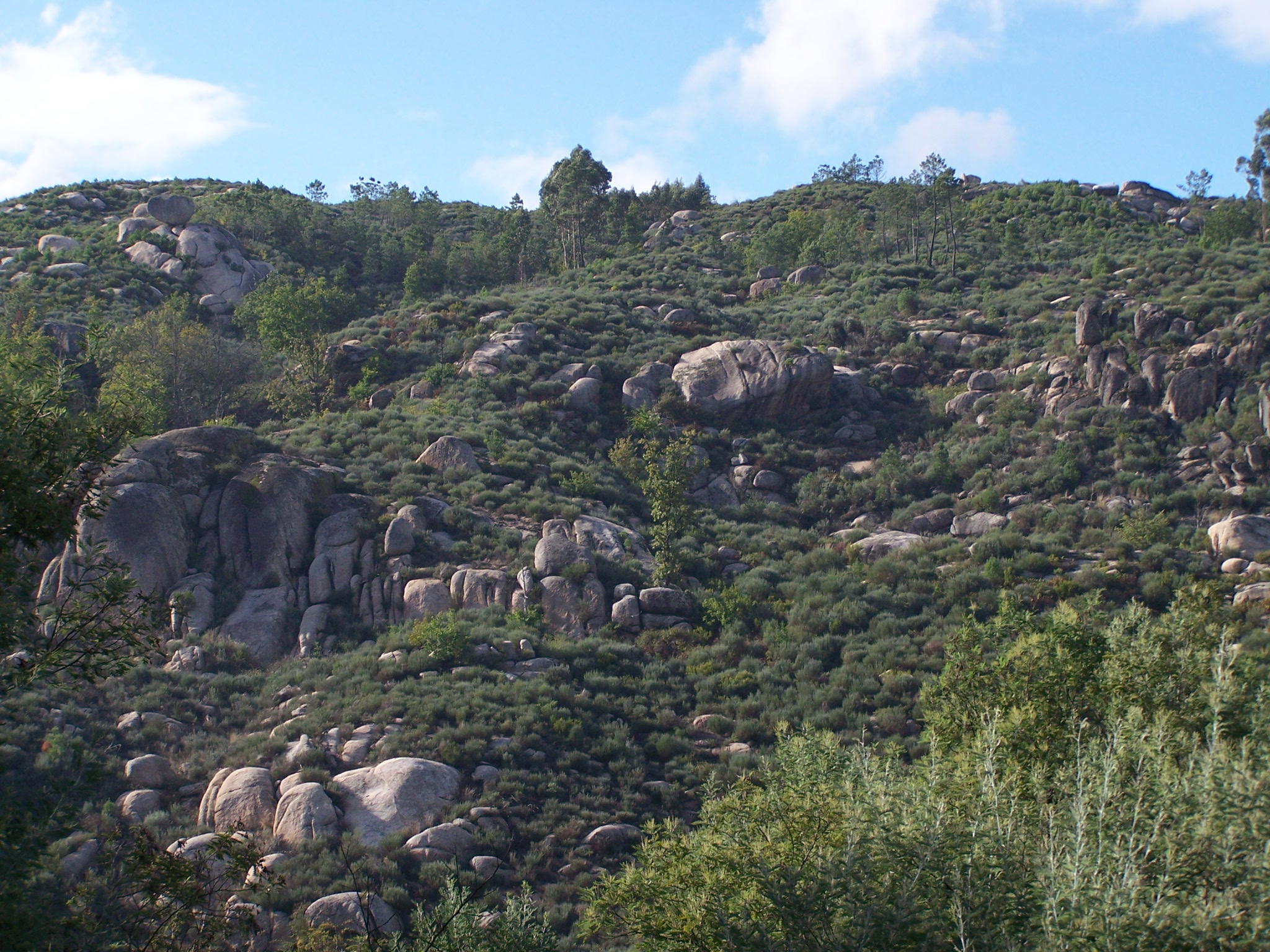
- The terrain around Caldas-da-Cavaca, showing the rugged rock-outcroppings near the train terminal

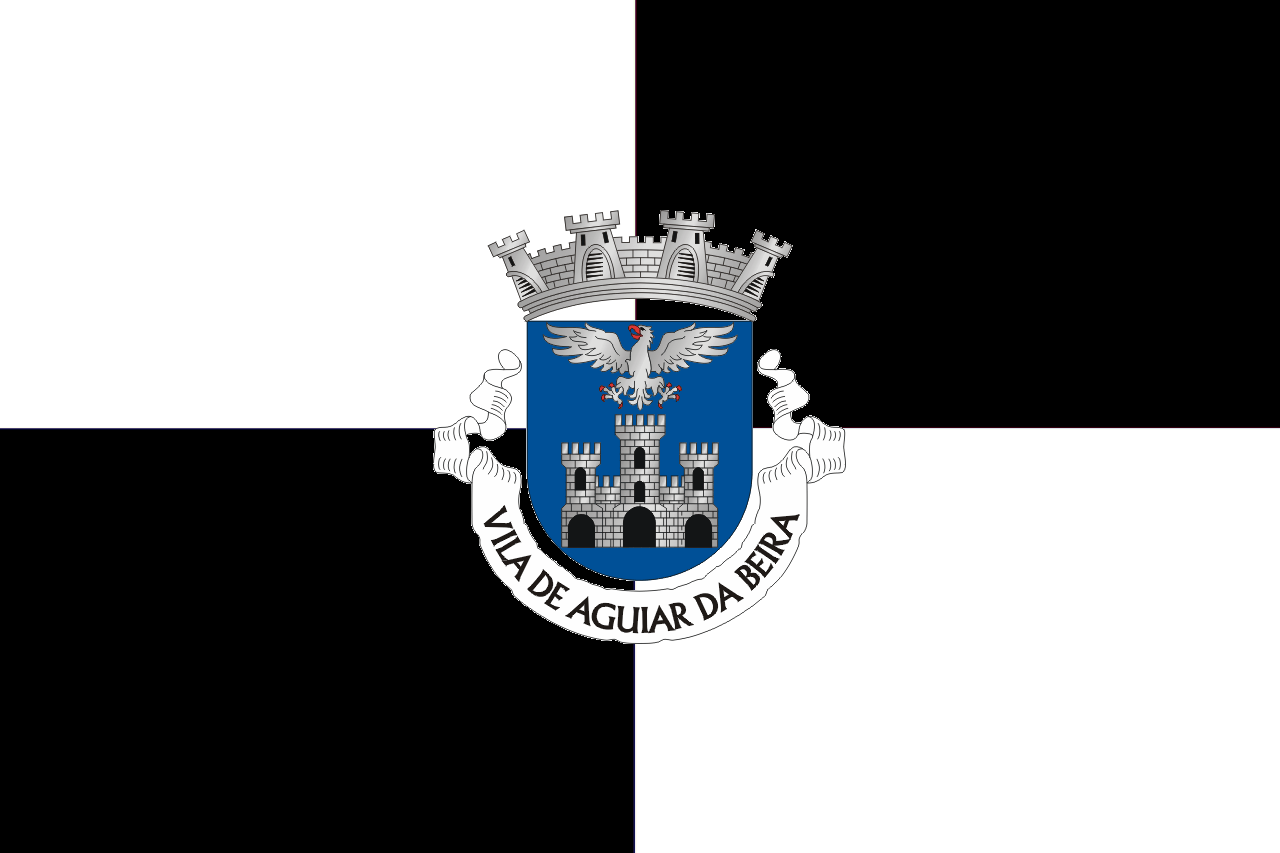
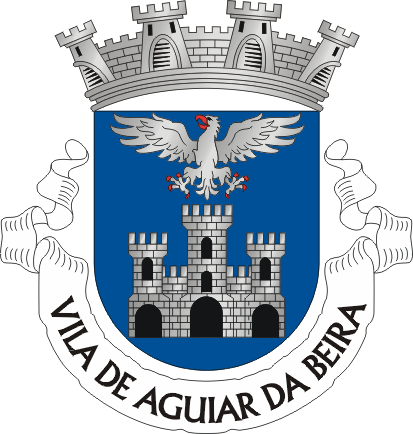
- Flag Coat of arms
- Interactive map of Aguiar da Beira
- Location in Portugal
- Coordinates: 40°49′03″N 7°32′36″W
- Country: Portugal
- Region: Centro
- Intermunic. comm.: Viseu Dão Lafões
- District: Guarda
- Parishes: 10

Government
  - President: Virgílio da Cunha (Movimento Independente)

Area
  - Total: 206.77 km^{2} (79.83 sq mi)

Population (2011)
  - Total: 5,473
  - Density: 26.47/km^{2} (68.55/sq mi)
- Time zone: UTC+00:00 (WET)
  - Summer (DST): UTC+01:00 (WEST)
- Area code: 292
- Website: http://www.cm-aguiardabeira.pt

Aguiar da Beira (European Portuguese: [ɐɣiˈaɾ ðɐ ˈβɐjɾɐ]) is a municipality in Guarda District in Portugal. The population in 2011 was 5,473, in an area of 206.77 km^{2} (79.83 sq mi).

The present Mayor is Virgílio da Cunha, elected by an independent group of citizens. The municipal holiday is February 10.

== History ==
Analysis of archaeological patrimony in the region suggest that human occupation in the region extends to the 4 millennium B.C., from investigations at the megalithic site of Carapito and the Dolmen of Carapito. Within the proto-historic period, three sites (Castro de Carapito, Castro da Gralheira and Castro das Albelhas) were primary settlements in the region that collected small populations. On these sites were evidence of Roman tiles (specifically Castro da Gralheira and Castro das Albelhas), suggesting a longer period of settlement, beyond the Roman occupation.

Roman presence in the region also included vestiges, as in the case of granite edicules, in the locality of Penaverde (later conserved in the National Archaeological Museum in Lisbon), and various ashlars reused in the construction the medieval castle of Aguiar da Beira, as well as the typical of other localities in the municipality in the construction of residences in the region.

After the fifth century, although during a period of instability caused by barbarian invasions, later Muslim armies and wars of Reconquest, settlement of continued in the region, during the later Medieval Age. This is evident from the tombstones and burial grounds, as well as sarcophagus in necropoles in Aguiar da Beira and Moreira. This included various isolate sites, such as in Penaverde or Mosteiro, or alternately in Colherinhas, Pinheiro and Sequeiros, that point to human presence between the 7th and 12th century. The early Middle Ages in the area resulted from a period of pacification, the reinforcement of local administration and development of structures (judicial and socio-economic) that included the concession of a forals (charters) to reinforce settlement. This is how Aguiar da Beira, and Penaverde, received their first forals in the 13th century, in order to develop and fix populations in the region. At the beginning of the 16th century, Carapito was elevated to the status of municipality, in a foral issued by King D. Manuel I. A letter to establish a fair in the town of Aguiar da Beira was issued during the reign of King D. Dinis in 1308, which reveals the importance of the settlement, in terms of its dynamic economic role in the region.

After the 16th century, and during the modern era, the territory has been governed by the administration of the town of Aguiar da Beira as regional seat, and divided between the three principal localities of Aguiar, Carapito and Penaverde. This was maintained until the 19th century, when the Liberal administrative reform resulted in the extinction of Carapito and Penaverde in 1836 (when the first was incorporated into Aguiar da Beira and the second into the neighbouring Transcoso). But, in the 1840 reformulation, Penaverde was transferred to the municipality of Aguiar, and temporarily re-obtaining the status of municipality in 1898, aggregating the former municipalities of Carapito and Penaverde, before definitively part of Aguiar after this period.

== Geography ==
Population of Aguiar da Beira (1864 - 2011)
Year	Pop.	±%
1864	6,909	—
1878	7,566	+9.5%
1890	8,053	+6.4%
1900	8,466	+5.1%
1911	8,919	+5.4%
1920	8,635	−3.2%
1930	8,545	−1.0%
1940	9,625	+12.6%
1950	10,177	+5.7%
1960	10,215	+0.4%
1970	8,464	−17.1%
1981	7,285	−13.9%
1991	6,725	−7.7%
2001	6,247	−7.1%
2011	5,473	−12.4%

The municipality of Aguiar da Beira is situated 70 kilometres (43 mi) from the district capital, part of the Beira Alta, comarca of Transcoso, Diocese of Viseu and Centro Tourism Region, in addition to integrating part of the Intermunicipal Community of Dão-Lafões.

It is limited in the north by the municipality of Sernancelhe, east by Trancoso, southeast by Fornos de Algodres, southwest by Penalva do Castelo and west by Sátão.

Administratively, the municipality is divided into 10 civil parishes (freguesias):

- Aguiar da Beira e Coruche
- Carapito
- Cortiçada
- Dornelas
- Eirado
- Forninhos
- Pena Verde
- Pinheiro
- Sequeiros e Gradiz
- Souto de Aguiar da Beira e Valverde
