= Tunisian Forum for Economic and Social Rights =

Non-governmental organization

The Tunisian Forum for Economic and Social Rights (Arabic: المنتدى التونسي للحقوق الإقتصادية والإجتماعية; French: Forum tunisien pour les droits économiques et sociaux, or FTDES) is a non-governmental organization in Tunisia. FTDES studies and makes recommendations about such socioeconomic issues as protest movements, economic policy, unemployment, state violence, transitional justice, anti-corruption, marginalization of Tunisia's interior (west-central) regions, and the Mediterranean migration crisis.

== Origin ==
The organization cites the January 2008 Gafsa Basin protests as well as the 2011 revolution as inspiration for its work.

== Leadership and structure ==
As of 2021, the FTDES executive director is Alaa Talbi.

== Actions ==
Among the core activities of the FTDES is researching and publishing monitoring reports on current issues of social and economic concern in Tunisia.

In 2015, the FTDES worked with families of missing youth who had migrated to Italy to pressure the government into forming a commission of inquiry about their fates.

== Collaborations ==
FTDES is a member organization of the EuroMed Rights network alongside other Tunisian organizations including the Committee for the Respect of Freedom and Human Rights in Tunisia (CRLDHT), the Tunisian Association of Democratic Women (ATFD), the Federation of Tunisians for a Citizenship of the Two Shores (FTCR), and the Tunisian Human Rights League (LTDH). It also part of the La Roujou3 ("No Return" or "Never Again") national awareness campaign for transitional justice with Lawyers Without Borders and Al Bawsala. The Forum is also a member of the Legal Empowerment Network.
