= Santa Joana =

Santa Joana may refer to:

- Santa Joana (parish) - in Aveiro Municipality, Portugal
- Santa Joana River - river in Espírito Santo, Brazil
- Santa Joana, Princesa de Portugal - a Portuguese princess considered holy by the Catholic Church
- Santa Joana, work by George Bernard Shaw
- Santa Joana, Portuguese for Jeanne d'Arc
