= Talbi =

Talbi is a surname. Notable people with the surname include:

- Ahmed Talbi (born 1981), Moroccan footballer
- Alaa Talbi (born 1978), Tunisian Civil Society and Human Rights activist
- Chemsdine Talbi (born 2005), Belgian footballer
- Mohamed Talbi (1921–2017), Tunisian historian and professor
- Montassar Talbi (born 1998), French-born Tunisian footballer
- Rachamim Talbi (born 1943), Israeli footballer
- Rachid Talbi Alami (born 1958), Moroccan politician
- Zouhair Talbi (born 1995), Moroccan-American runner

See also

- Mozaffar-e Talbi, is a village in Qeshlaq-e Sharqi Rural District, Qeshlaq Dasht District, Bileh Savar County, Ardabil Province, Iran
- Qeshlaq-e Qarqoli Rahim Talbi, is a village in Qeshlaq-e Sharqi Rural District, Qeshlaq Dasht District, Bileh Savar County, Ardabil Province, Iran
