= Aveiro, Portugal =

Aveiro
- Municipality
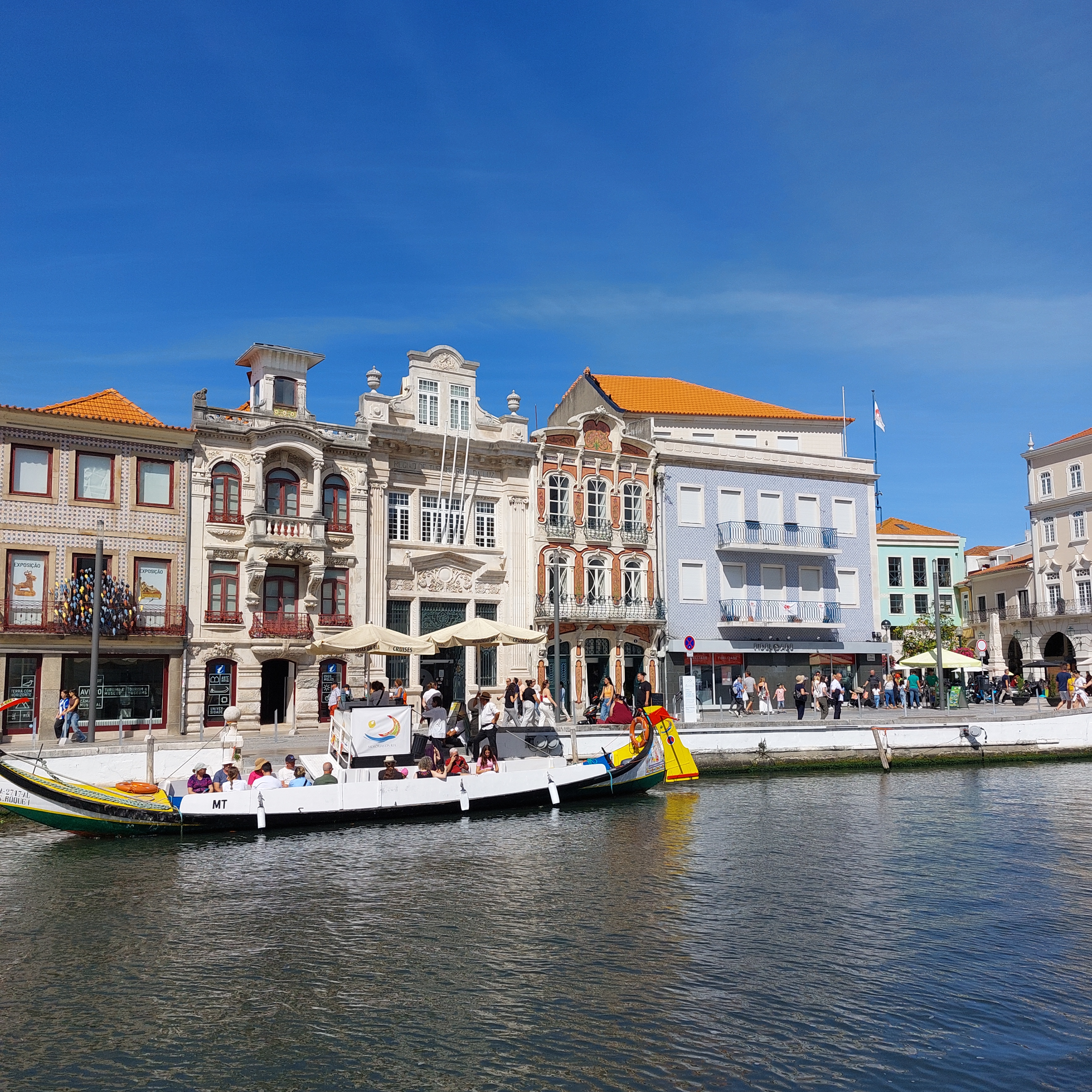
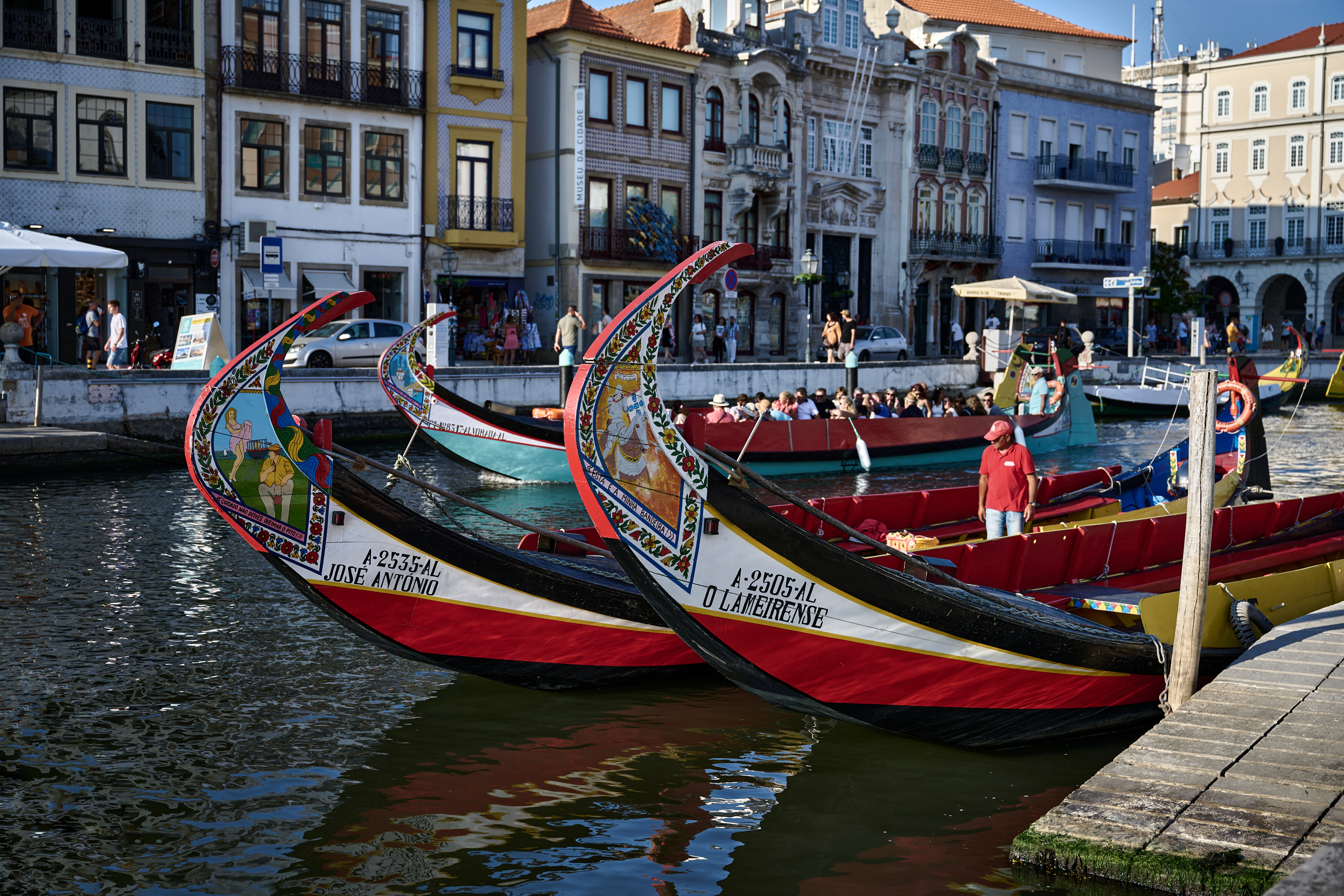
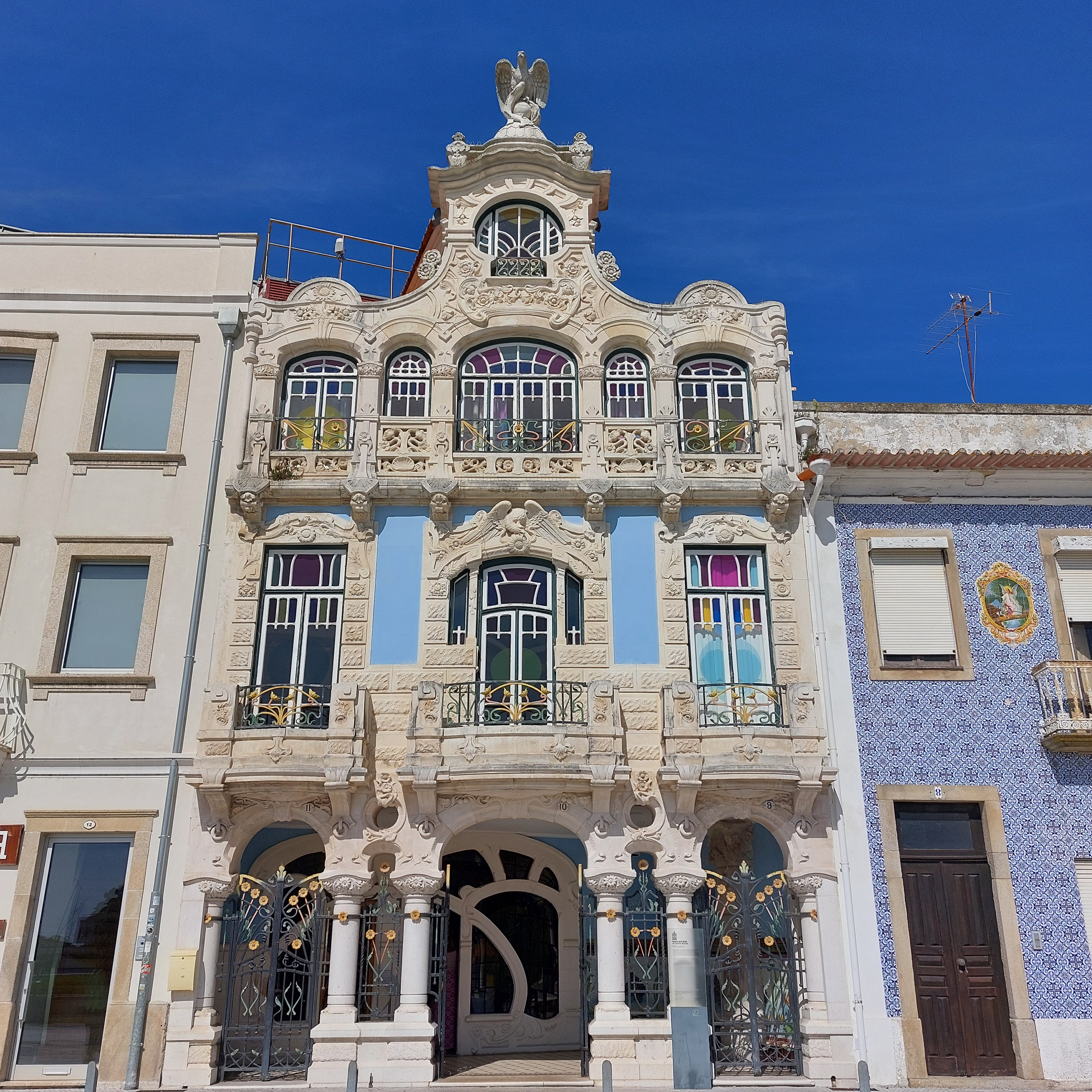
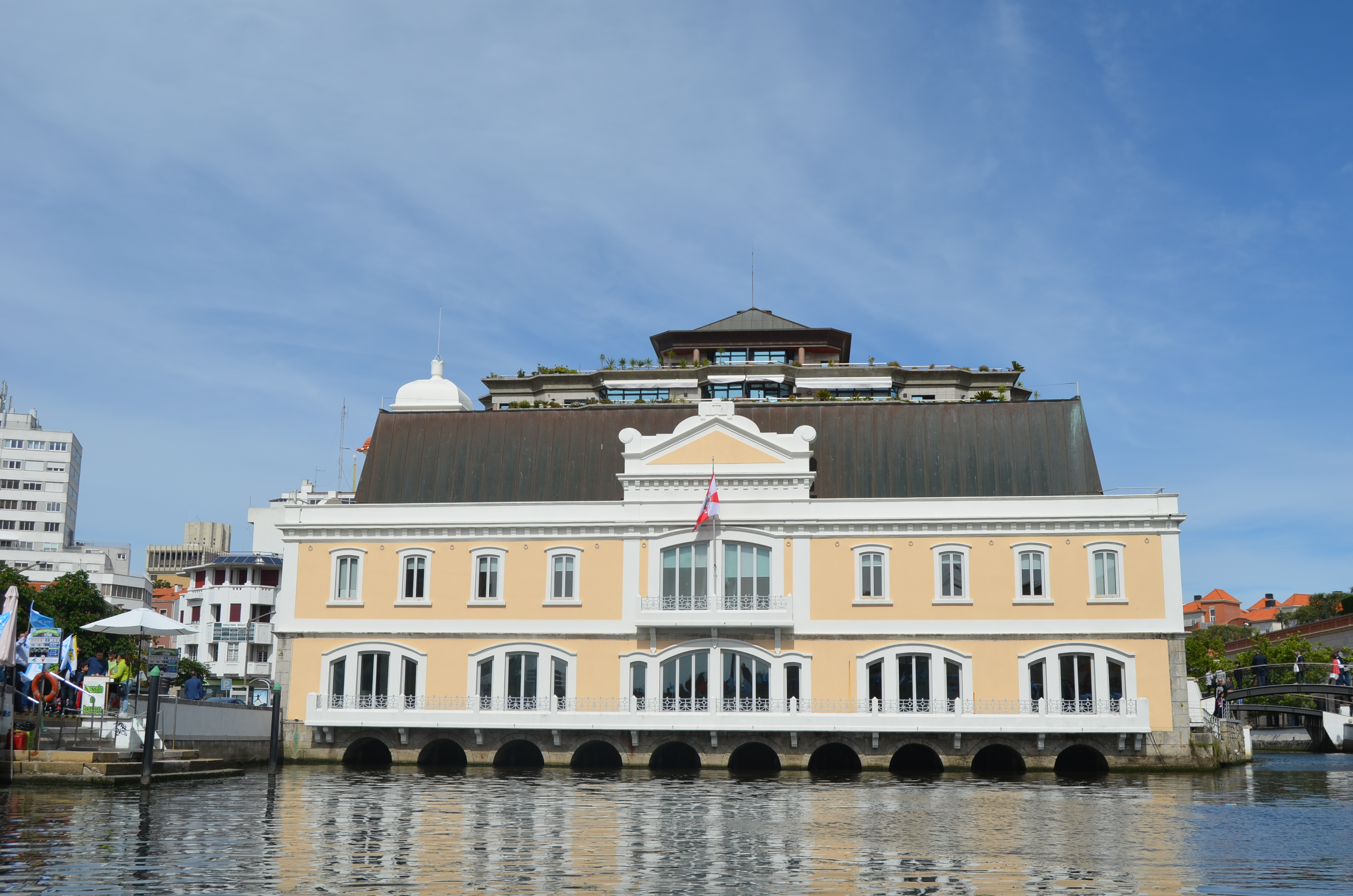
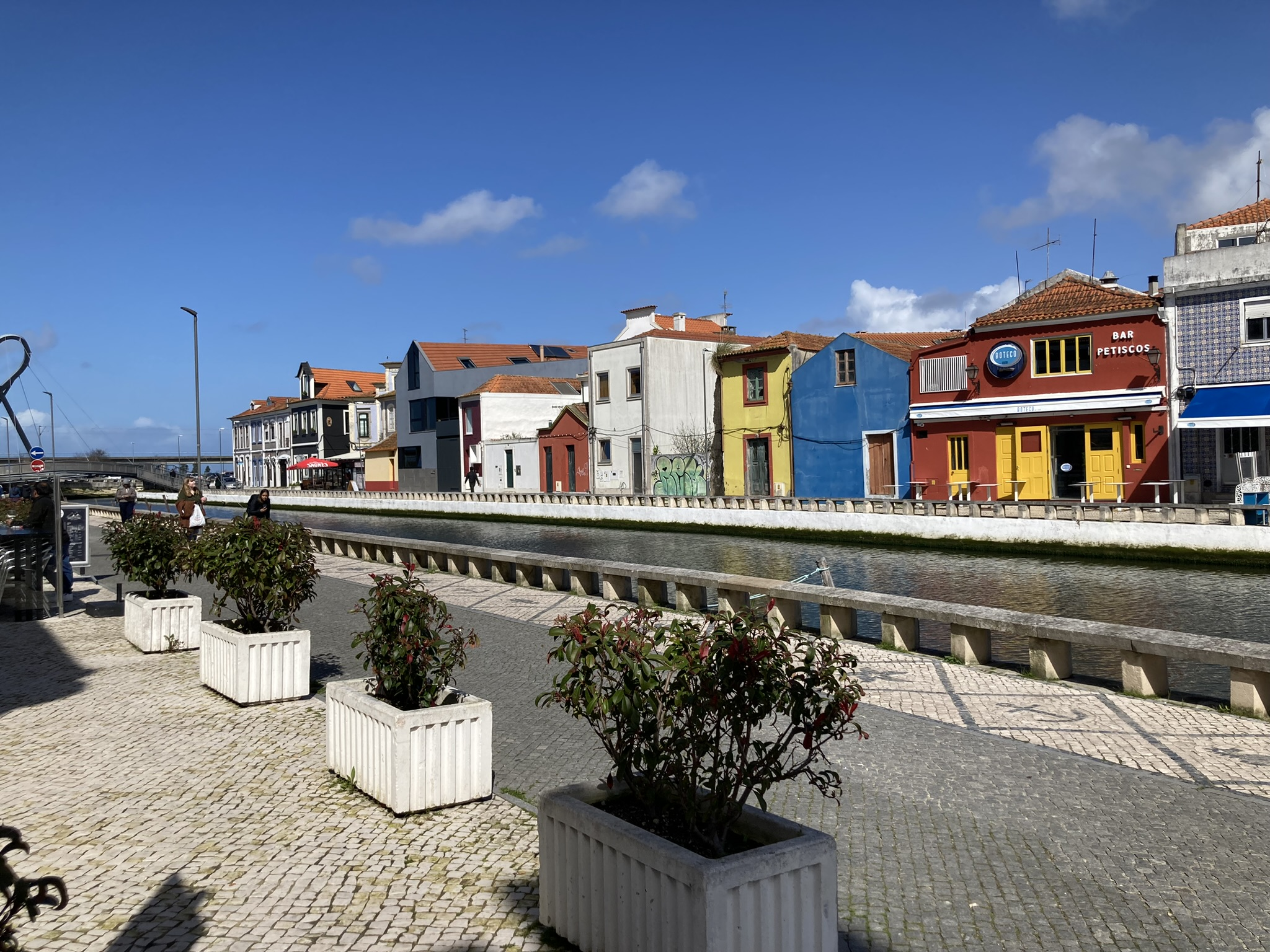
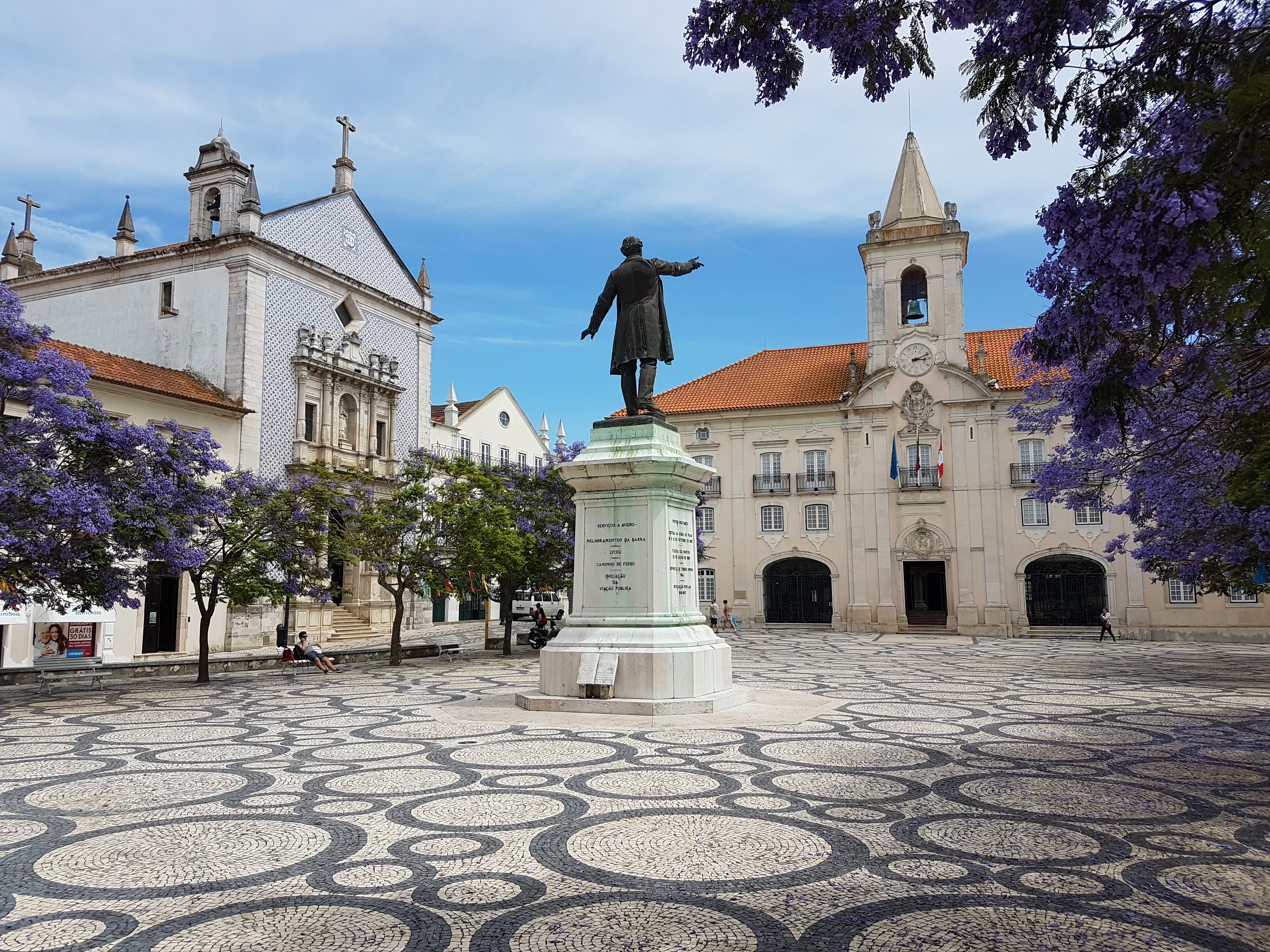
- Canal dos Botirões Moliceiro Boat Museum Old Capitania do Porto Palheiros Republic Square

- Flag Coat of arms
- Interactive map of Aveiro
- Location in Portugal
- Coordinates: 40°38′N 8°39′W
- Country: Portugal
- Region: Centro
- Intermunic. comm.: Região de Aveiro
- District: Aveiro
- Parishes: 10

Government
  - President: Luís Souto Miranda (PSD-CDS–PP)

Area
  - Total: 197.58 km^{2} (76.29 sq mi)

Population (2021)
  - Total: 80,880
  - Density: 409.4/km^{2} (1,060/sq mi)
- Time zone: UTC+00:00 (WET)
  - Summer (DST): UTC+01:00 (WEST)
- Local holiday: 12 May
- Website: cm-aveiro.pt (in Portuguese)

Aveiro (pronounced [aˈvɐjɾu]) is a city and a municipality in Portugal. In 2021, the population was 80,880, in an area of 197.58 square kilometres (76.29 mi^{2}): it is the fifth most populous city in the Centro Region of Portugal (after Coimbra, Leiria, Viseu and Torres Novas).

Along with the neighbouring city of Ílhavo, Aveiro is part of an urban agglomeration that includes 120,000 inhabitants, making it one of the most important populated regions by density in the North Region, and primary centre of the Intermunicipal Community of Aveiro and Baixo Vouga. Administratively, the president of the municipal government is Luís Souto Miranda, elected by coalition between the Social Democratic Party and the Democratic Social Centre, who governs the ten civil parishes (Portuguese: freguesias).

== History ==
The presence of human settlement in the territory of Aveiro extends to the period associated with the great dolmens of pre-history, which exist in most of the region. The Latinised toponym Averius derived from the Celtic word aber (river-mouth, etym.< Brythonic *aber < Proto-Celtic *adberos, compare Welsh Aberystwyth).

For a long period Aveiro was an important economic link in the production of salt and commercial shipping. It was a centre of salt exploration by the Romans and trade centre through the Middle Ages, registered since 26 January 959 (from the testament of Countess Mumadona Dias to the cenóbio of Guimarães). During this testament, Mumadona Dias also highlighted the ancient name for Aveiro, this time referring to the monastery's lands in Alauario et Salinas, literally, "a gathering place or preserve of birds and of great salt". From 11th century onwards, Aveiro became popular with Portuguese royalty because of its strategic location.

=== Kingdom of Portugal ===
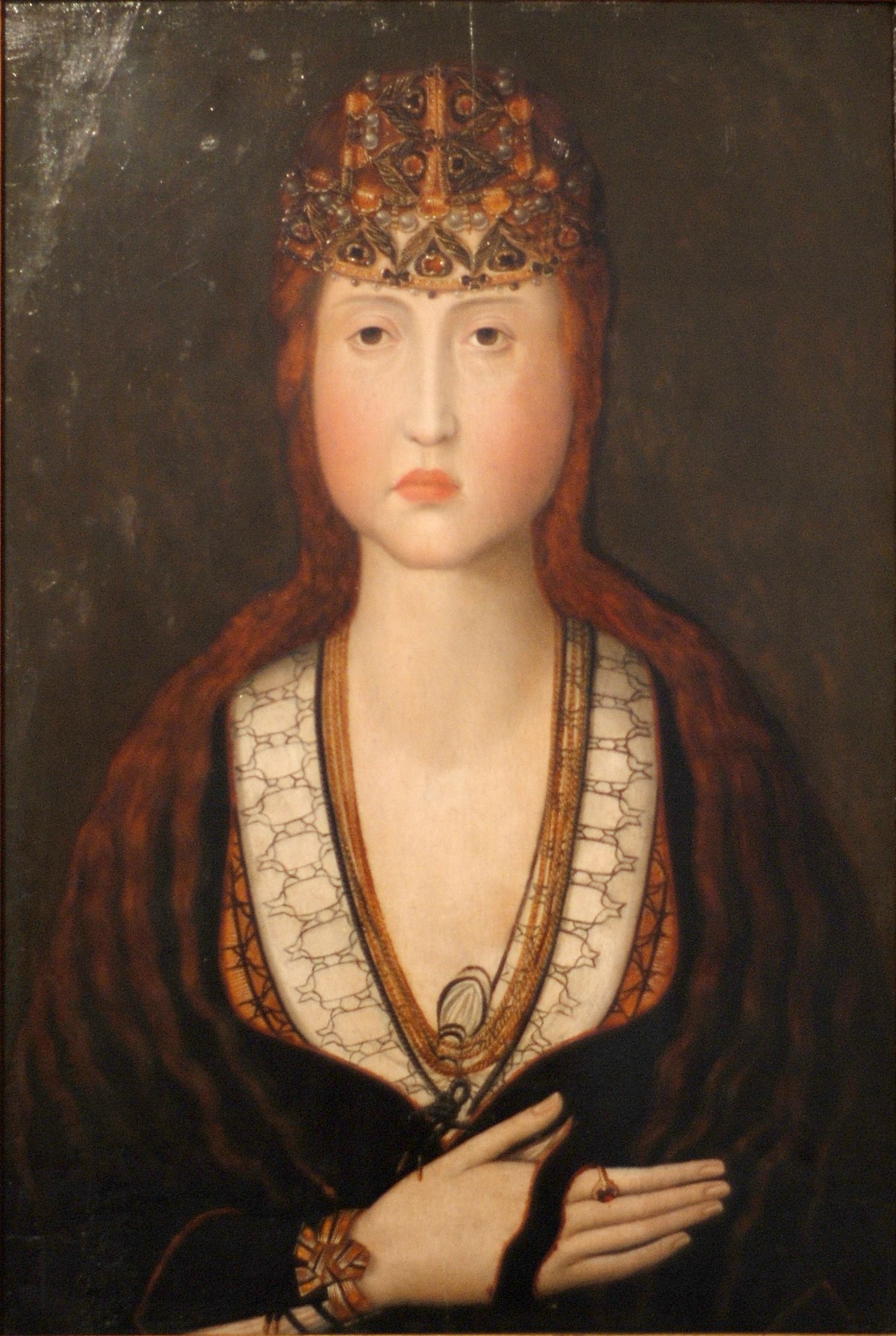
Infanta D. Joana, daughter of King Afonso V

Later, King João I, on the advice of his son Pedro, who was the donatary of Aveiro, requested the construction of fortification walls.

King D. Duarte conceded in 1435 the privilege of providing an annual duty-free fair, later referred to as the Feira de Março (March Fair), today still an annual tradition.

The Princess St. Joana, daughter of Afonso V lived in Aveiro, entering the convent of Jesus, and lived there until her death on 12 May 1490. During her life her presence brought attention to the town, and favoured it with an elevated level of development for the time.

The first charter (foral) was conceded by Manuel I of Portugal on 4 August 1515, as indicated in the Livro de Leituras Novas de Forais da Estremadura. Its geographic position along the Aveiro River had always helped it to subsist and grow, supported by salt market, fishing and maritime commercial development. By the beginning of the 15th century, there already existed a great wall around the historical centre, intonating the significance of the community and growth of the population. This included the founding of many religious institutions and their supports, which assisted during the 17th and 18th century crises associated with silt in the waterway. In the winter of 1575, a terrible storm closed the entrance to its port, ending a thriving trade in metals and tiles, and creating a reef barrier at the Atlantic Ocean. The walls were subsequently demolished and used to create the docks around the new sand bar.

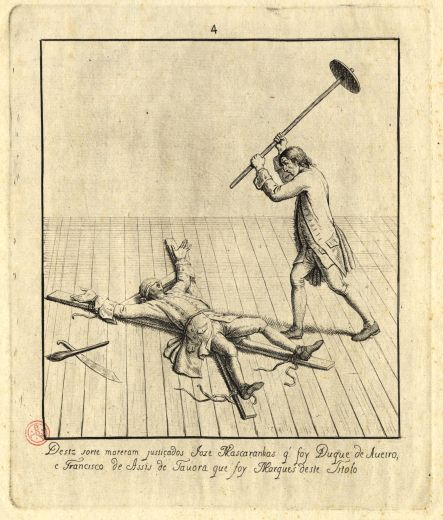
A depiction of the execution of Duke José Mascarenhas of Aveiro

Between the 16th and 17th centuries, the river's instability at the mouth (between the Ria and open ocean) resulted in the closure of the canal, impeding the use of the port of Aveiro, and creating stagnation in the waters of the lagoon. This blow to the economy created a social and economic crisis, and resulted in the decrease in the population and emigration. It was at this time that the Church of the Misericórdia was constructed, during the Philippine Dynastic union.

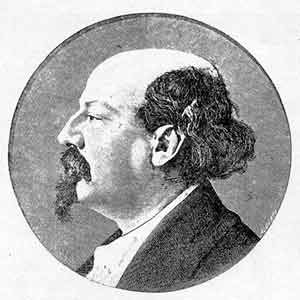
José Estêvão, parliamentary and 19th-century hero

In 1759, King José I elevated the town to the status of city, a few months after condemning the Duke of Aveiro (a title established in 1547 by João III), José Mascarenhas, to death. As a result, Aveiro became known as Nova Bragança; this was abandoned later and returned to Aveiro. In 1774, by request of King José, Pope Clement XIV instituted the Diocese of Aveiro.

In the 19th century, the Aveirense were active during the Liberal Wars, and it was José Estêvão Coelho de Magalhães, a parliamentary member who was determinant in resolving the problem of access along the Ria. He also helped with the development of transport, especially the railway line between Lisbon and Porto. It was the opening of the artificial canals, completed in 1808, that allowed Aveiro to expand economically, marking the beginning in the town's growth.

The municipality was elevated to the status of town, centered on its principal church, consecrated to the Archangel Michael, today the location of the Praça da República (having been demolished in 1835).

== Geography ==
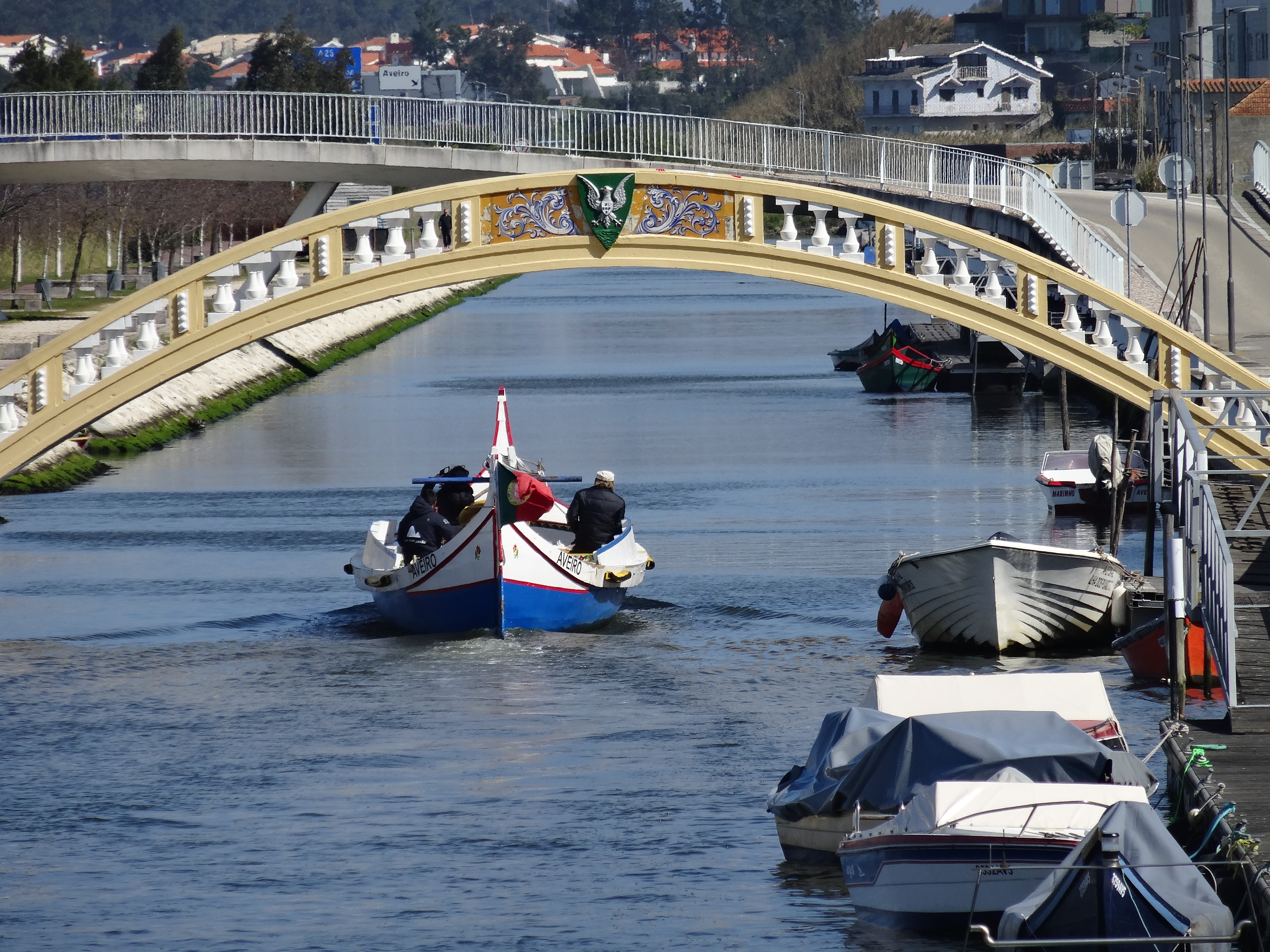
Bridge over canal in Aveiro

Located on the shore of the Atlantic Ocean, Aveiro is an industrial city with an important seaport.

The seat of the municipality is the city of Aveiro, comprising the five urban parishes with about 73,003 inhabitants. The city of Aveiro is also the capital of the District of Aveiro, and the largest city in the Baixo Vouga intermunicipal community subregion.

Aveiro is known as "the Portuguese Venice", due to its system of canals and boats similar to the Italian city of Venice.

=== Climate ===
Aveiro has a warm-summer Mediterranean climate influenced by its proximity to the Atlantic Ocean. The maritime influence causes a narrow temperature range resulting in summers averaging around 24 to 25 °C (75 to 77 °F) in daytime temperatures, considerably lower than inland areas on the same parallel on the Iberian Peninsula. As typical of Mediterranean climates, summers are dry and winters are wet. A characteristic of the coastal climate is that frosts are very rare and never severe. The hottest temperature recorded was 39.3 °C (102.7 °F). Temperatures above 32 °C (90 °F) are only occasional.

Climate data for Aveiro, 1991–2020 normals
Month	Jan	Feb	Mar	Apr	May	Jun	Jul	Aug	Sep	Oct	Nov	Dec	Year
Record high °C (°F)	22.5 (72.5)	25.0 (77.0)	28.9 (84.0)	32.5 (90.5)	39.0 (102.2)	37.6 (99.7)	39.3 (102.7)	38.1 (100.6)	35.1 (95.2)	36.1 (97.0)	26.0 (78.8)	24.0 (75.2)	39.3 (102.7)
Mean daily maximum °C (°F)	14.6 (58.3)	15.6 (60.1)	17.6 (63.7)	18.6 (65.5)	20.8 (69.4)	22.8 (73.0)	24.0 (75.2)	24.5 (76.1)	23.7 (74.7)	21.4 (70.5)	17.3 (63.1)	15.4 (59.7)	19.7 (67.4)
Daily mean °C (°F)	10.7 (51.3)	11.5 (52.7)	13.5 (56.3)	14.7 (58.5)	16.9 (62.4)	19.1 (66.4)	20.2 (68.4)	20.5 (68.9)	19.5 (67.1)	17.4 (63.3)	13.7 (56.7)	11.6 (52.9)	15.8 (60.4)
Mean daily minimum °C (°F)	6.8 (44.2)	7.4 (45.3)	9.4 (48.9)	10.9 (51.6)	13.1 (55.6)	15.4 (59.7)	16.4 (61.5)	16.4 (61.5)	15.4 (59.7)	13.4 (56.1)	10.0 (50.0)	7.8 (46.0)	11.9 (53.3)
Record low °C (°F)	−3.0 (26.6)	−2.5 (27.5)	0.0 (32.0)	1.5 (34.7)	5.5 (41.9)	8.5 (47.3)	11.4 (52.5)	10.0 (50.0)	8.5 (47.3)	3.5 (38.3)	1.0 (33.8)	−3.0 (26.6)	−3.0 (26.6)
Average precipitation mm (inches)	132.7 (5.22)	87.0 (3.43)	81.3 (3.20)	95.5 (3.76)	75.0 (2.95)	27.9 (1.10)	11.6 (0.46)	19.9 (0.78)	51.3 (2.02)	132.4 (5.21)	134.7 (5.30)	126.1 (4.96)	975.4 (38.39)
Average precipitation days (≥ 1 mm)	12.7	9.3	8.9	10.3	8.2	4.0	2.3	2.4	5.2	10.8	12.0	11.2	97.3
Source: Instituto Português do Mar e da Atmosfera

=== Demography ===
The civil parishes of the municipality of Aveiro

Population of Aveiro Municipality (1801 – 2008)
1801	1849	1900	1930	1960	1981	1991	2001	2008	2021
14 144	10 780	24 919	31 644	46 055	60 284	66 444	73 335	73 100	80 880

Administratively, the municipality is divided into 10 civil parishes (Portuguese: freguesias):

- Aradas
- Cacia
- Eixo e Eirol
- Esgueira
- Glória e Vera Cruz (urban centre and location of the seat of the municipality of Aveiro)
- Oliveirinha
- Requeixo, Nossa Senhora de Fátima e Nariz
- Santa Joana
- São Bernardo
- São Jacinto

São Jacinto is located on an eponymous peninsula, between the Atlantic Ocean and Ria de Aveiro. Aveiro had 61,430 eligible voters in 2006.

== International relations ==
Aveiro's sister cities are:

- – Arcachon, France, since 1989
- – Belém, Brazil, since 1970
- – Bourges, France, since 1989
- – Cholargos, Greece, since 2001
- – Ciudad Rodrigo, Spain, since 1989
- – Cubatão, Brazil, since 1992
- – Farim, Guinea-Bissau, since 1992
- – Forlì, Italy, since 1990
- – Inhambane, Mozambique, since 1989
- – Mahdia, Tunisia, since 1998
- – Ōita, Japan, since 1978
- – Panyu District, China since 2000
- – Pelotas, Brazil, since 1996
- – Pemba, Mozambique, since 1995
- – Santa Cruz, Cape Verde, since 1993
- – Santo António, São Tomé and Príncipe, since 1998
- – Trois-Rivières, Canada, since 1996
- – Viana do Castelo, Portugal, since 1910

== Economy ==
Aveiro was known for many years for its production of salt and for the moliço seagrass harvest, which was used as fertilizer before the development of chemicals for that purpose. The boats once used for harvesting now carry tourists on the canals. Salt production has also decreased dramatically with only a few salt ponds still remaining.

The region is now known for the preponderance of ceramics industries, a reflection of the regions advancements, resulting in a long productive tradition since the late Roman, early medieval period (reflected in the ceramics kilns).

Software development is important too, both at the R&D centre for a large telecom company and at the University of Aveiro (UA) which is attended by 15,000 students on undergraduate and postgraduate programs. UA works with companies in national and European R&D projects.

The city of Aveiro has several shopping centers and malls (Pingo Doce Shopping Center, Fórum Aveiro, Glicínias Plaza (Jumbo – Auchan), Aveiro Center (Continente & Mediamarkt), Aveiro's Retail Park and the Oita Shopping Center). This city has many traditional commerce stores. The most central one being Forum Aveiro with clothes stores, restaurant zone and book stores.

The town's unemployment rate in 2015 was 12.5%; the University of Aveiro is a major employer.

=== Tourism ===
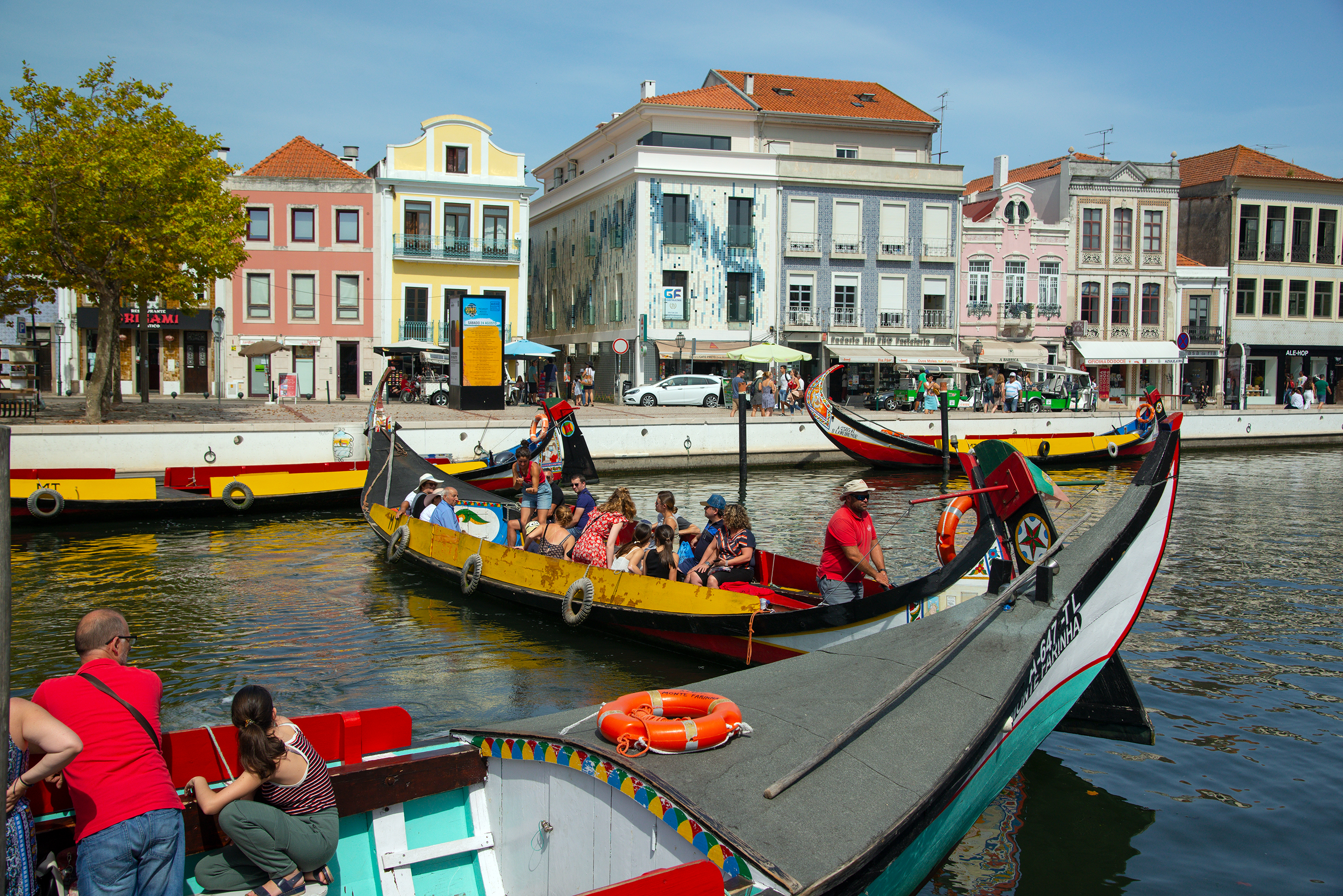
The central area with its Art Nouveau buildings and boat rides on Barcos Moliceiros attracts many tourists.

Tourism is also important for the economy. The old town centre, with its Art Nouveau and Romanesque architecture and "gondolas" (barcos moliceiros once used for collecting moliço seaweed) plying the Ria de Aveiro canals, is referred to as "The Venice of Portugal" in some tourist brochures.

Important tourist attractions are the Arte Nova (Art Nouveau) architectural designs and tiles of some buildings that were created in the early 20th century, the Art Nouveau museum, the Aveiro Museum (Museu de Aveiro, formerly the Mosteiro de Jesus convent with exhibits of King Afonso V's daughter, Santa Joana), the 15th century Aveiro Sé or São Domingos cathedral and the Church of Jesus (Igreja de Jesus) with its architecture. The nearby beaches, Costa Nova and Barra, attract many visitors in warm weather; they can be reached by bus from Aveiro. Other sites of interest to tourists include the Carmelite Church and the Misericórdia Church built in the 16th century.

=== Transport ===
The local economy is fed by a series of transport networks that cross the municipal boundaries.

==== Air ====
Regional gateways include air service through the Aeródromo de Aveiro/São Jacinto (LPAV) and the Porto de Aveiro (Ílhavo/Aveiro).

==== Rail ====
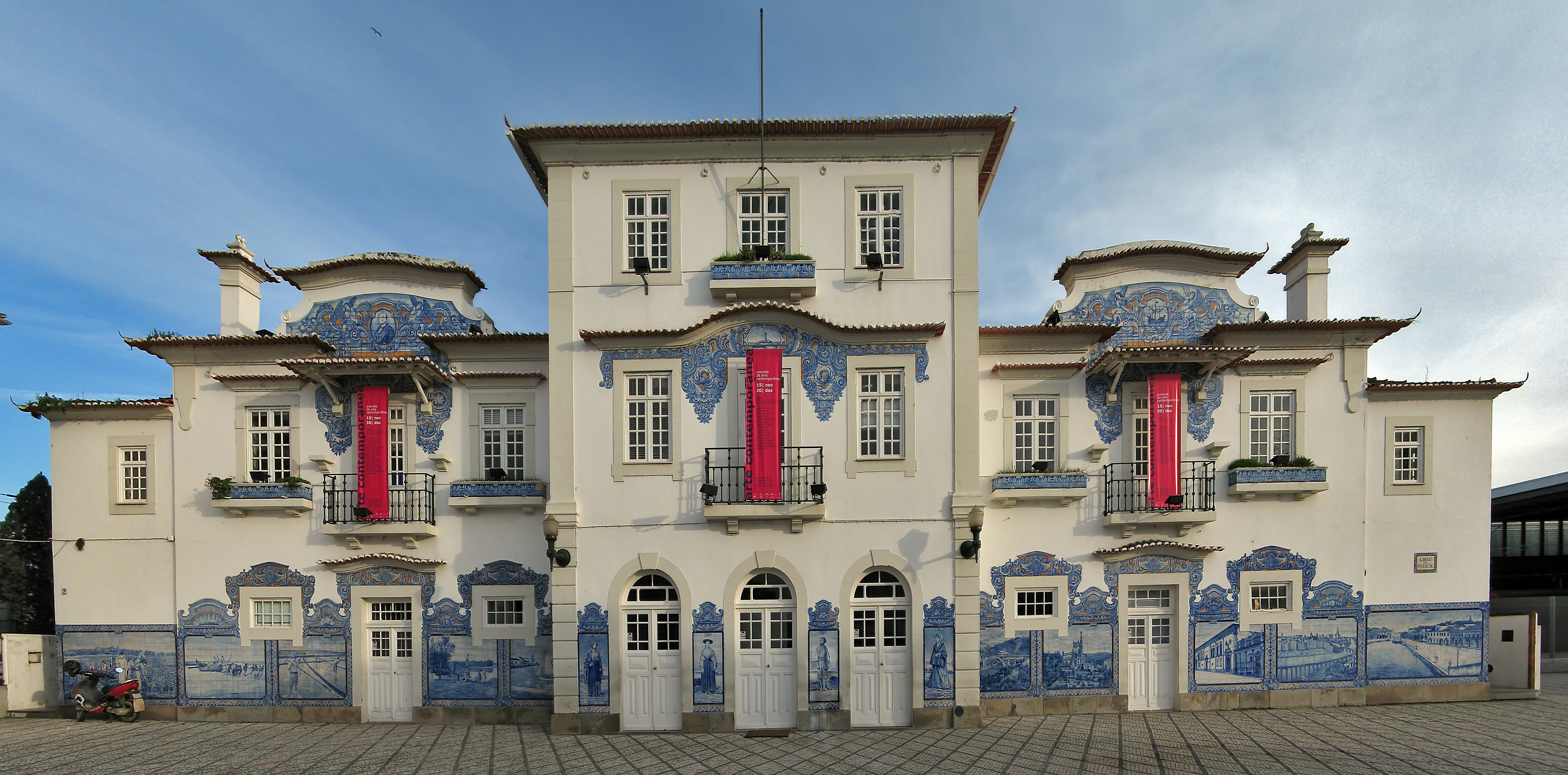
The old railway station

Rail service includes service by Alfa Pendular (between Lisbon and Braga; Lisbon and Oporto; Faro and Oporto) and Intercity (between Lisbon and Oporto as well as Lisbon and Guimarães) trains; suburban links through the Urbanos do Porto and, also, the Linha do Vouga, a narrow gauge railway to Águeda and Sernada do Vouga.

==== Road ====
The primary expressways and inter-regional thoroughfares include: A1 (between Porto and Lisbon); and the A25 (which links Viseu, Guarda and Vilar Formoso).

Intercity buses connect Aveiro with Porto and Lisbon several times a day.

==== Water ====
Moliceiros provide access along the Ria for tourist visits, in addition to traditional fishing or recreational purposes, including regattas.

== Architecture ==
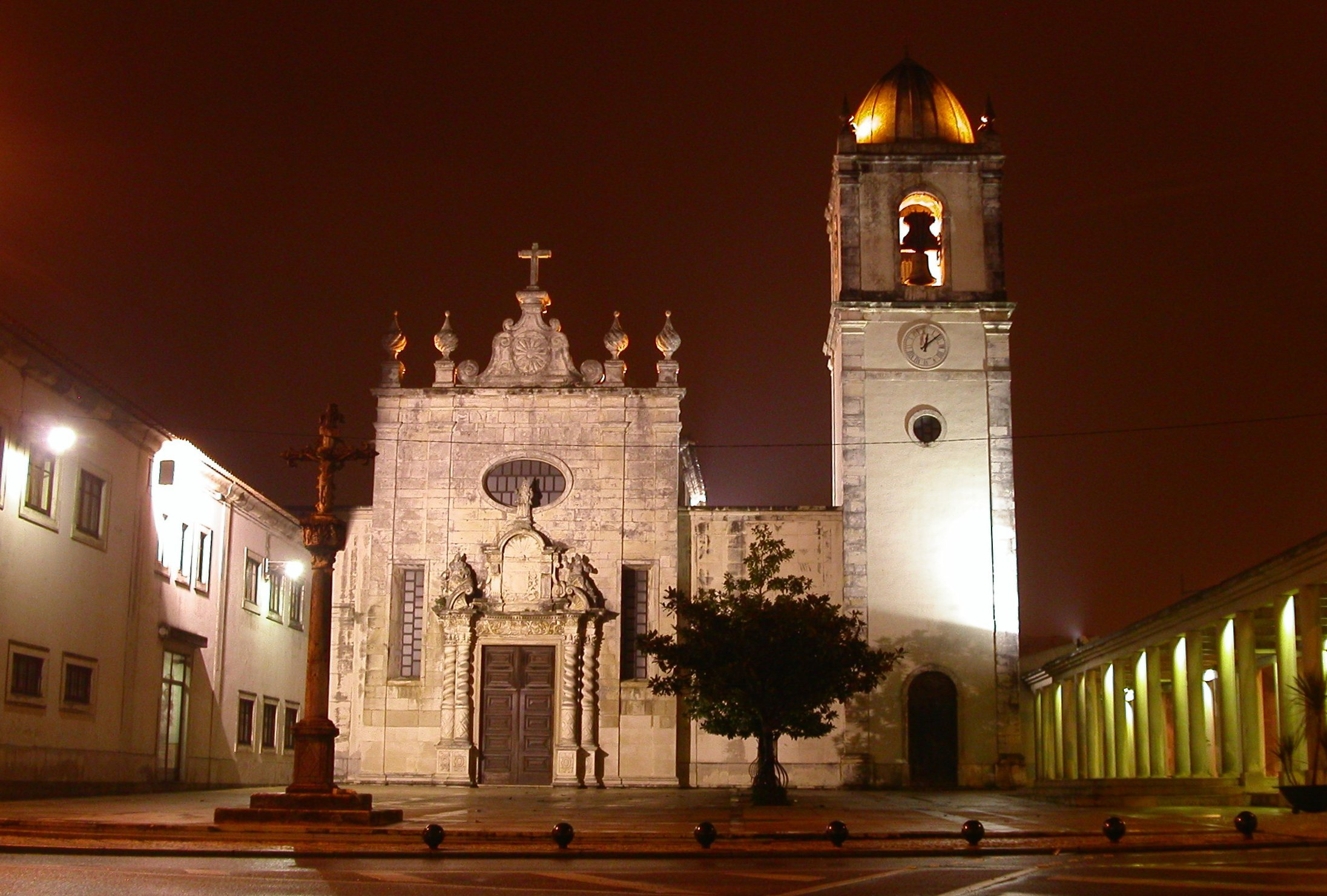
The front facade of the Cathedral of Aveiro

The architecture of Aveiro is influenced by two phases: the pre-Kingdom era, with a number of historical monuments; and the modernist movements resulting from the expansion of economy during the 19th-20th centuries.

The city's primary landmark is the 15th century Monastery of Jesus (Portuguese: Mosteiro de Jesus), containing the tomb of King Afonso V's daughter, St. Joana (who died in 1490). The presence of this royal personage, beatified in 1693, proved to be of great benefit when she bequeathed her valuable estate to the convent. In the 17th and 18th centuries, the convent housed a school of embroidery, but was transformed into the Museu de Santa Joana, or simply, the Museum of Aveiro, housing many of these handicrafts.

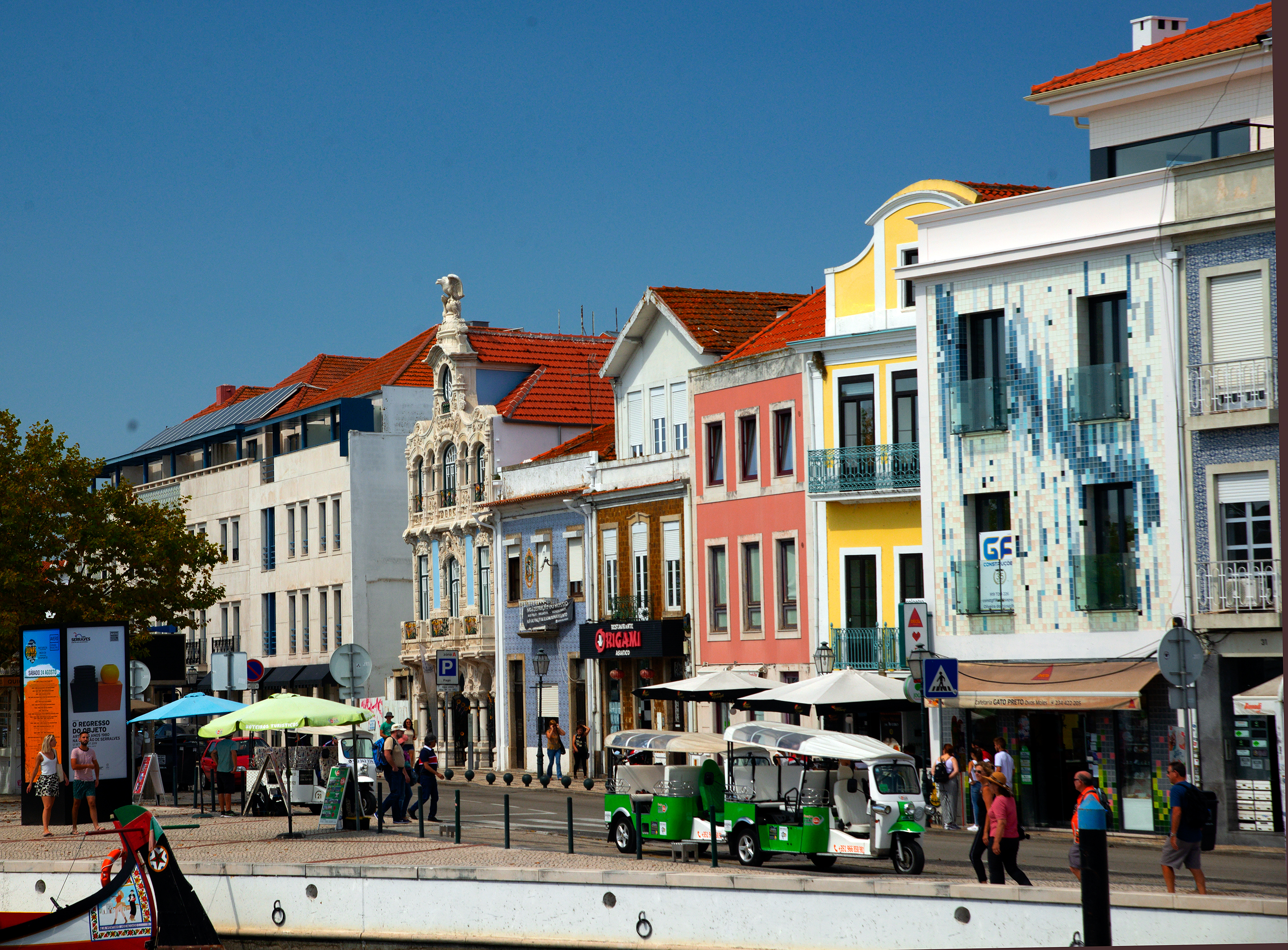
Art Nouveau (Novo) buildings in Aveiro (2019)

The abundance of 19th-20th century architectural buildings reflects the effects of the boom during that period, including many of the Arte Nova and Art Deco buildings, inspired by modernist trends and Nationalist tendencies of the Estado Novo regime. The best of these is in the university campus, where many of the nationalist architects were involved in construction projects. The Arte Nova architecture was built by wealthy families from Brazil; their buildings included homes and shops. Traditional Portuguese decorations such as tiles were used. The concept did not last for a long time, but its presence is very distinctive in Aveiro; it is one of only 20 cities in the world that are included in the Réseau Art Nouveau Network, listing cities in Europe that are known for this architectural style.

There are several attractions in the city of Aveiro, including cathedrals, canals and the beaches, including the Ílhavo ceramica de Vista Alegre and the beaches of Barra, Costa Nova do Prado, and Gafanha da Nazaré.

== Culture ==
Aveiro is known in Portugal for its traditional sweets, Ovos Moles de Aveiro (PGI), trouxas de ovos, both made from eggs. Raivas are also typical biscuits of Aveiro.

The municipal holiday is 12 May, the day of Joanna, Princess of Portugal (1452–1490).

== Education ==
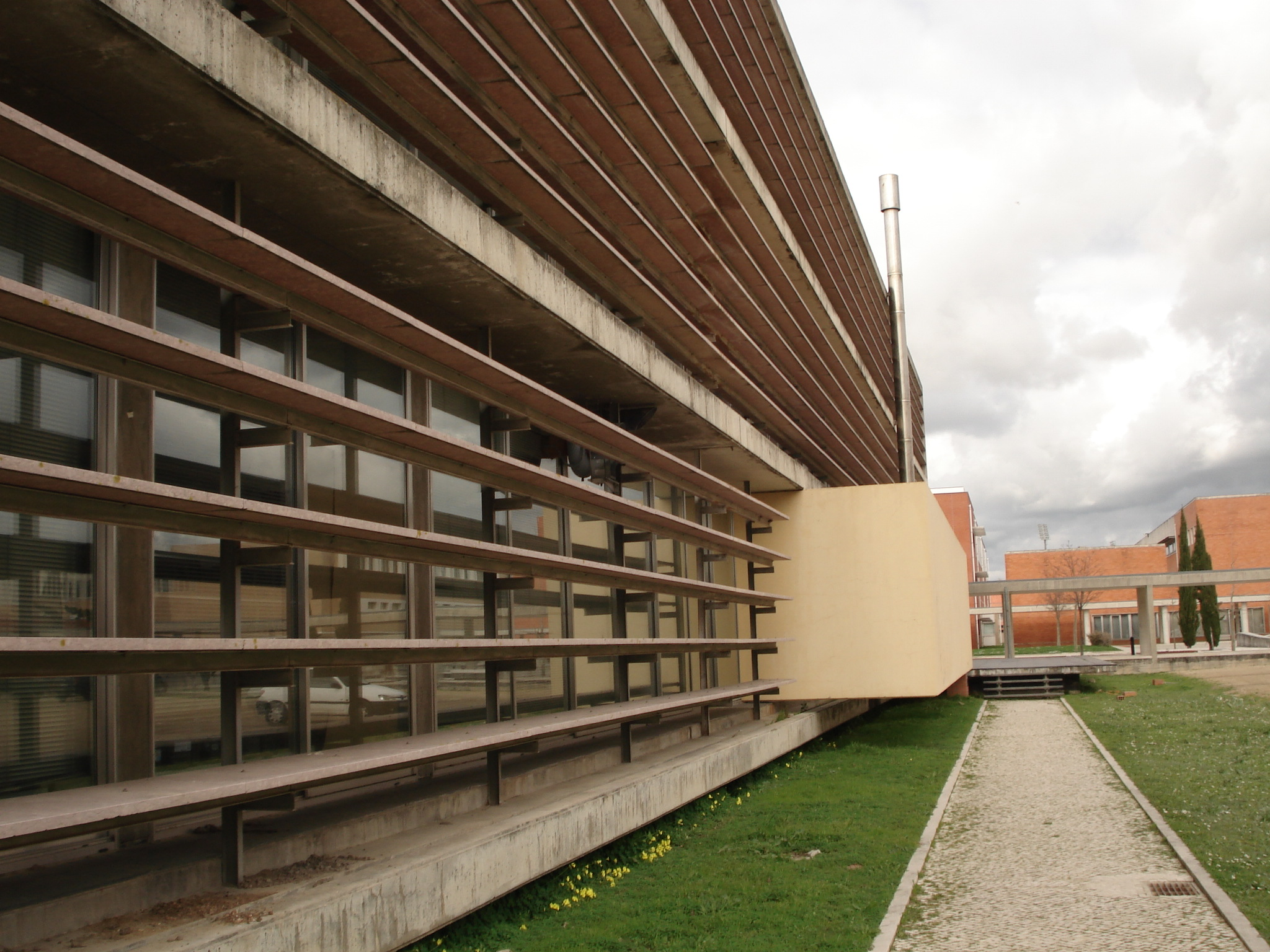
University of Aveiro

The University of Aveiro was created in 1973 and attracts thousands of students to the city. It is ranked as the 354th best university in the world in the Times World University Rankings, and the 2nd best in Portugal.

The university has about 430 professors (with PhD degrees), 11,000 undergraduate students, and 1,300 post-graduate students.

== Sport ==
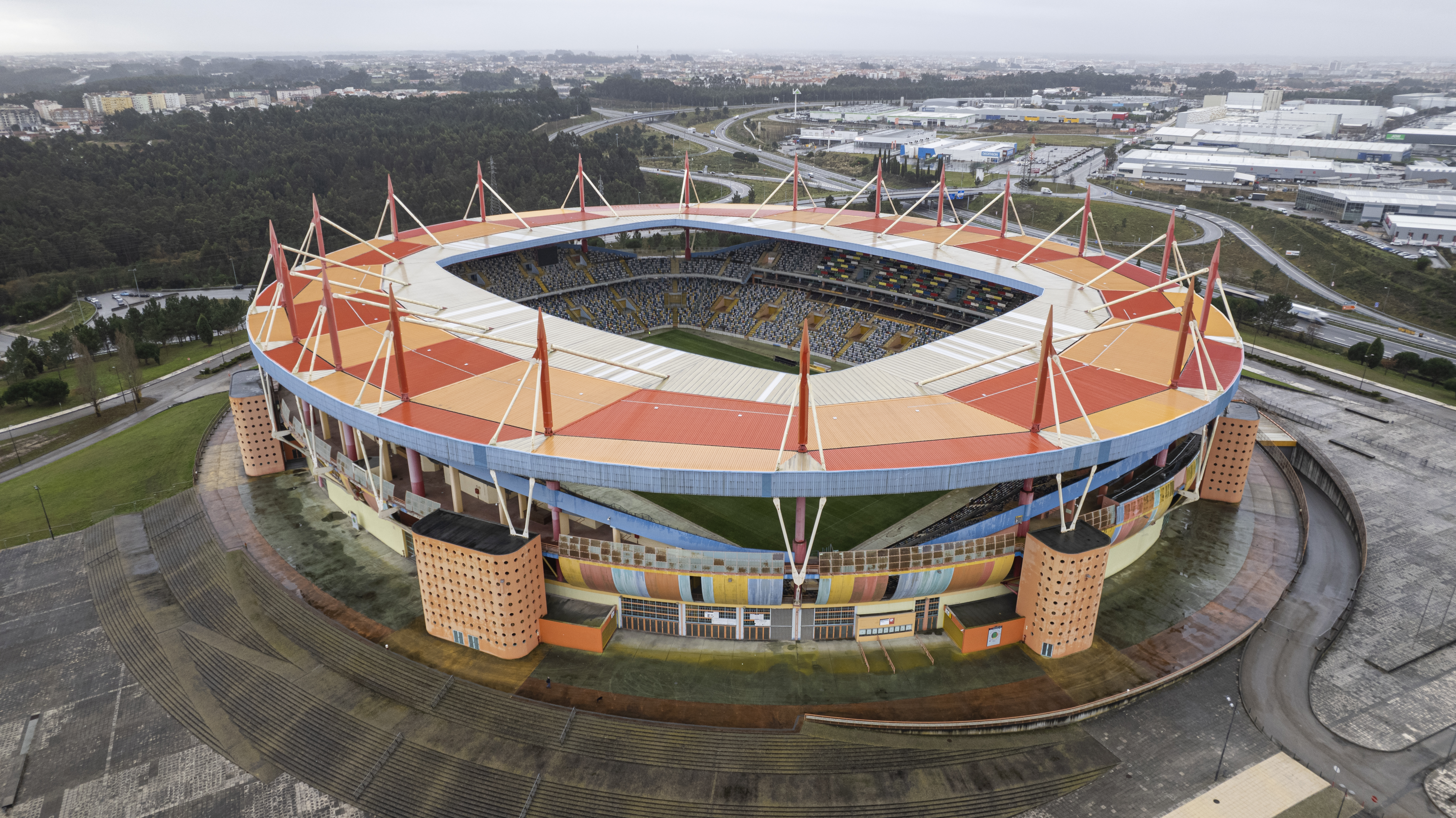
The Estádio Municipal de Aveiro used to host the football club S.C. Beira-Mar and was a venue at Euro 2004.

Sport Clube Beira-Mar is an association football club. Founded in 1922, it has a sports academy with various youth levels in sports including basketball and futsal. The club used to play at Estádio Municipal de Aveiro, designed by Portuguese architect Tomás Taveira for Euro 2004, where it held two group matches.

The other long-established club in the city, Os Galitos, was founded in 1904 and houses a wide variety of sports. Its rowers have represented Portugal in international tournaments including the Olympic Games.

== Notable citizens ==
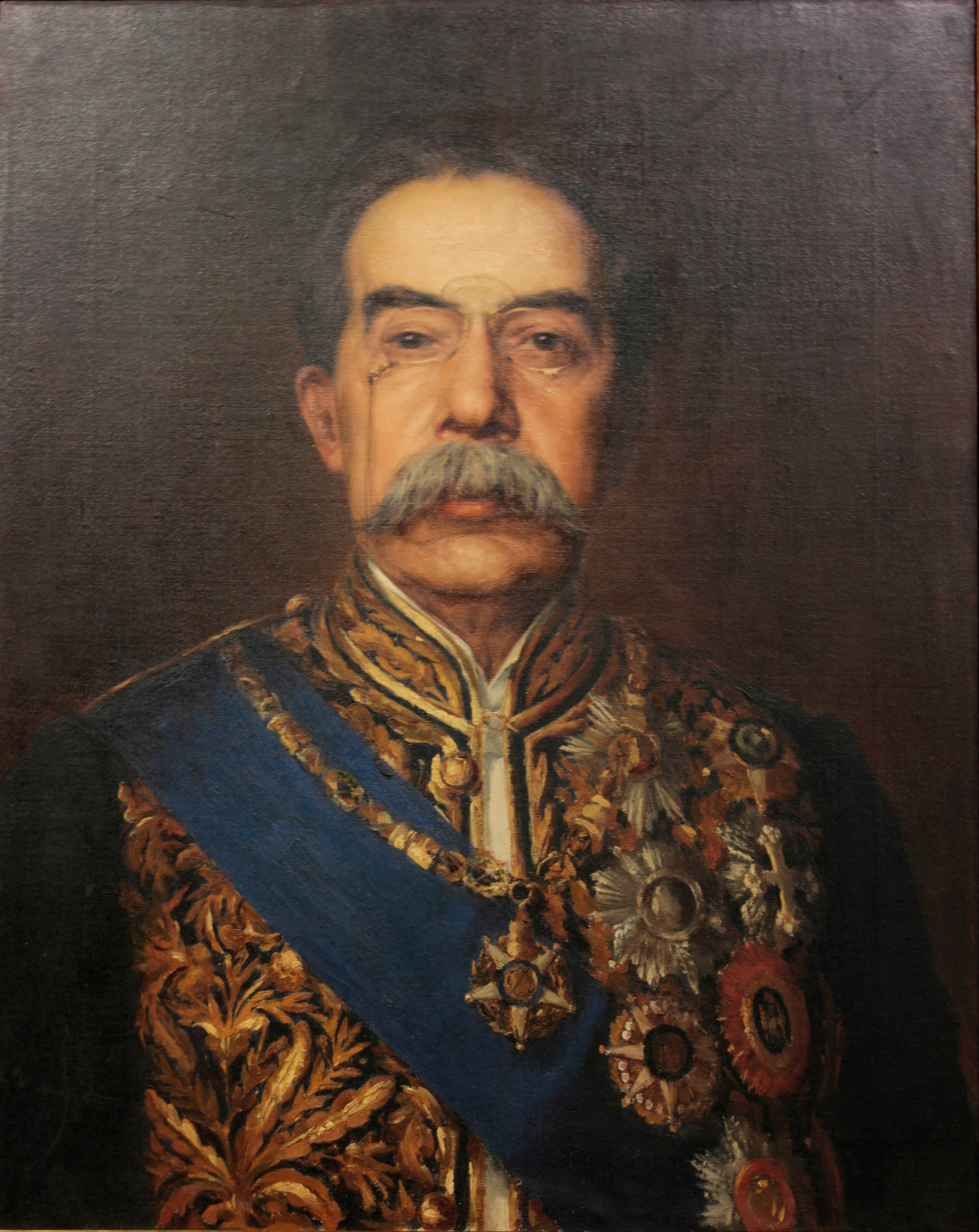
José Luciano de Castro, 1899

- Fernão de Oliveira (1507 – ca.1581), a Portuguese grammarian, Dominican friar, historian, cartographer, naval pilot and theorist on naval warfare and shipbuilding
- Antónia Rodrigues (1580–1641), a Portuguese soldier and national heroine
- Jean Hyacinthe de Magellan (1722–1790), a Portuguese natural philosopher
- José Luciano de Castro (1834 in Oliveirinha – 1914), a politician, statesman and journalist who served three times as Prime Minister of Portugal
- Jaime de Magalhães Lima (1859–1936), a Portuguese philosopher, poet and writer
- Mário Sacramento (1920–1969), physician and essayist, famous for his anti-fascist activities against the Estado Novo regime.
- José Afonso (1929–1987), known as Zeca Afonso, one of the most influential folk and political musicians in Portugal
- Rosa Alice Branco (born 1950 in Aveiro), a Portuguese poet.

=== Sport ===
- Alberto Rodrigues (1945–2025), Portuguese equestrian who competed at the 1992 Summer Olympics
- Telmo Pires (born 1953), former American international soccer player
- António Ribeiro (born 1980), former Canadian international soccer player
- Arnaldo Edi Lopes da Silva (born 1982), known as Edinho, former Portuguese international footballer
- Diogo Valente (born 1984), Portuguese footballer
- Peter Orry Larsen (born 1989), former Norwegian footballer
- Rui Raínho (born 1989), Portuguese footballer
- Ricardo Dias (born 1991), Portuguese footballer
- Mónica Soares (born 1994), Portuguese international women's handball player
- Diogo Branquinho (born 1994), Portuguese international handball player
- Ricardo Martins Guimarães (born 1995), known as Guima, Mozambican international footballer
- David Carmo (born 1999), Angolan international footballer
- Afonso Sousa (born 2000), Portuguese footballer
- Samú Costa (born 2000), Portuguese international footballer

== Gallery ==
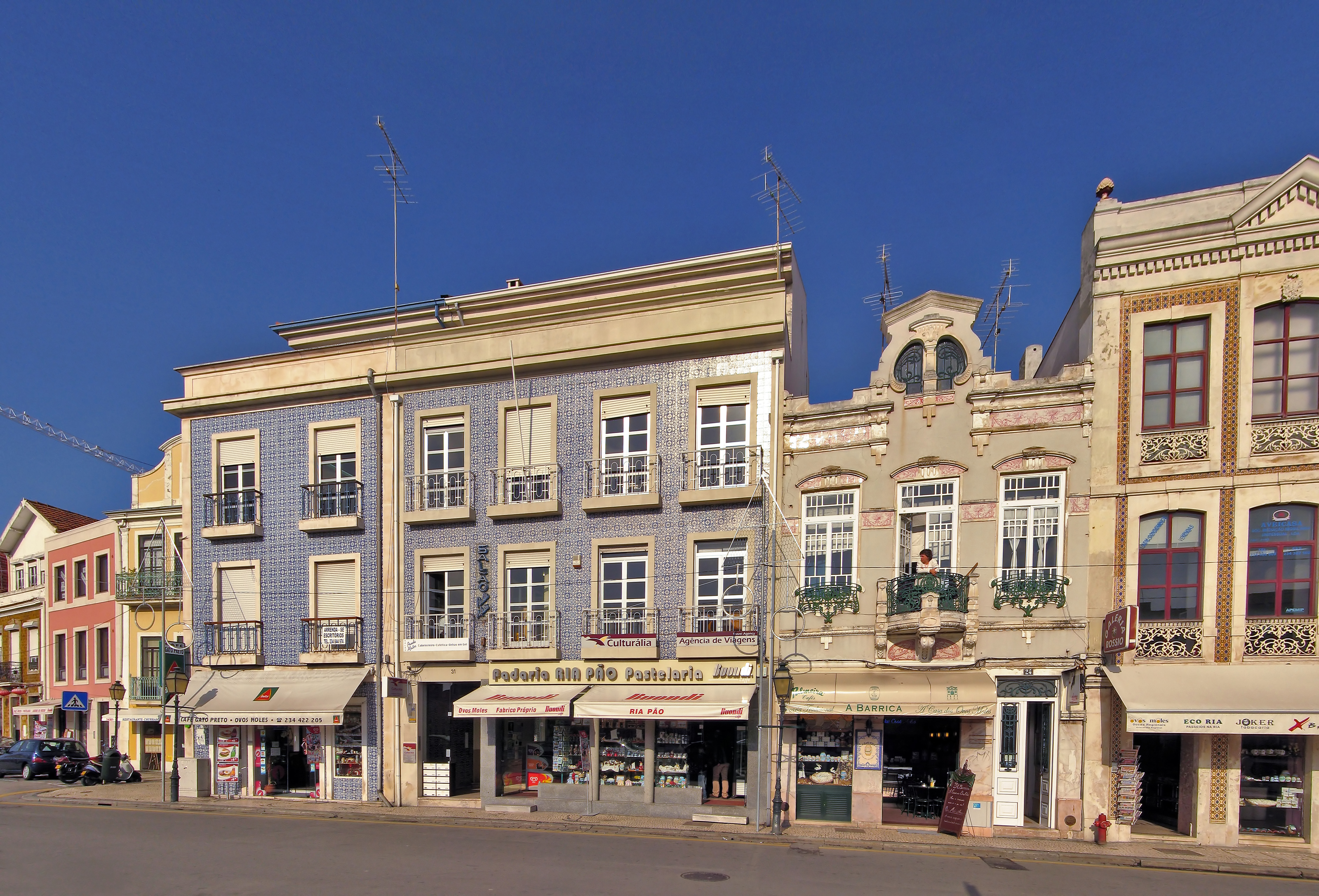
Typical azulejo façades of Aveiro.

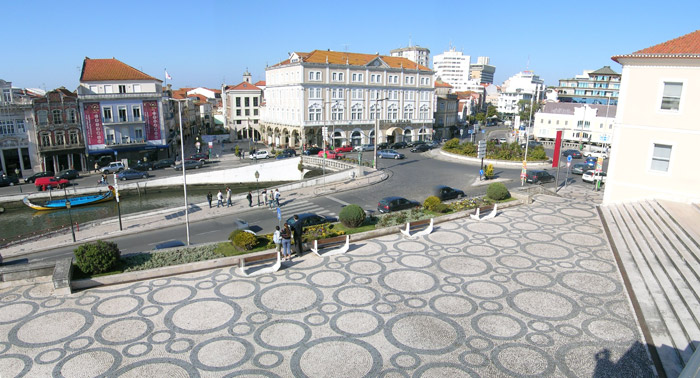
Aveiro, Portugal

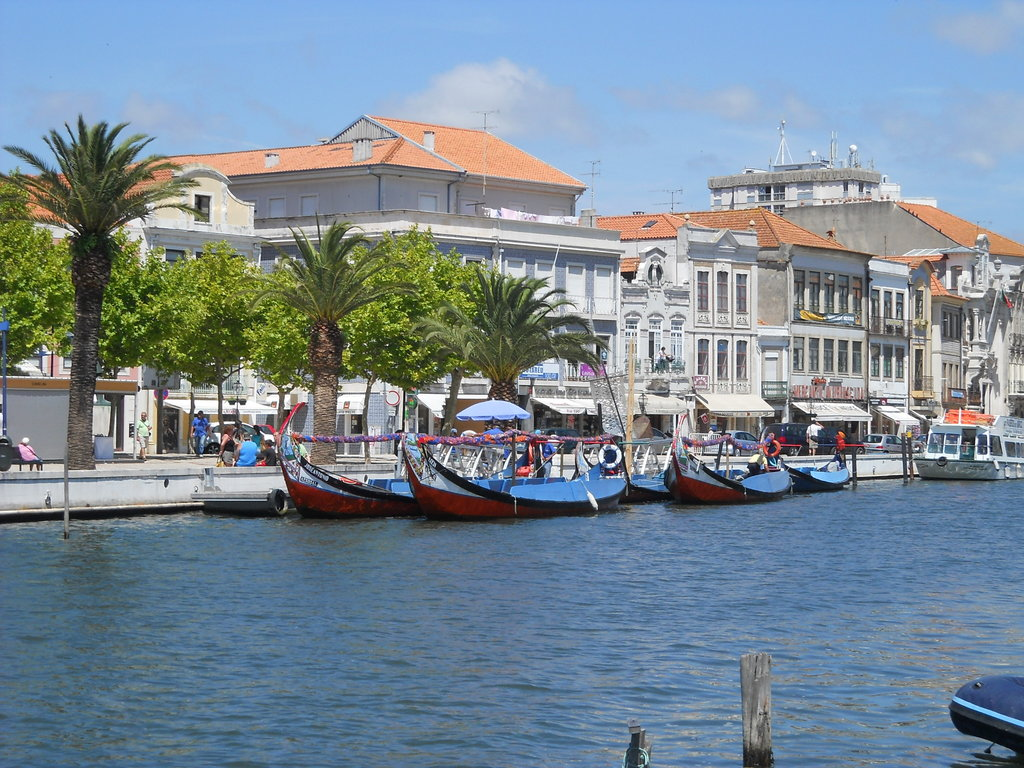
Aveiro, Portugal

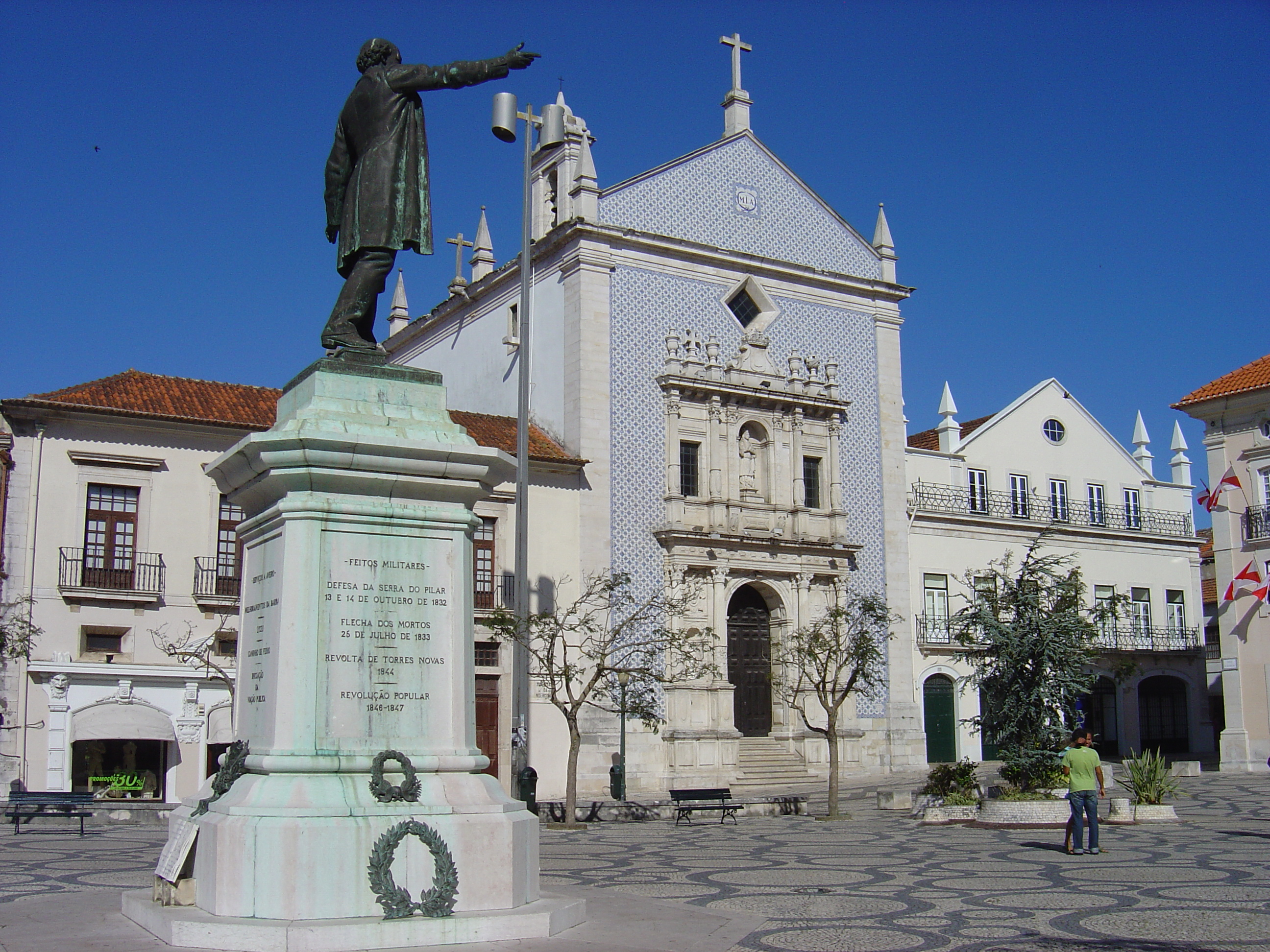
A square in Aveiro.

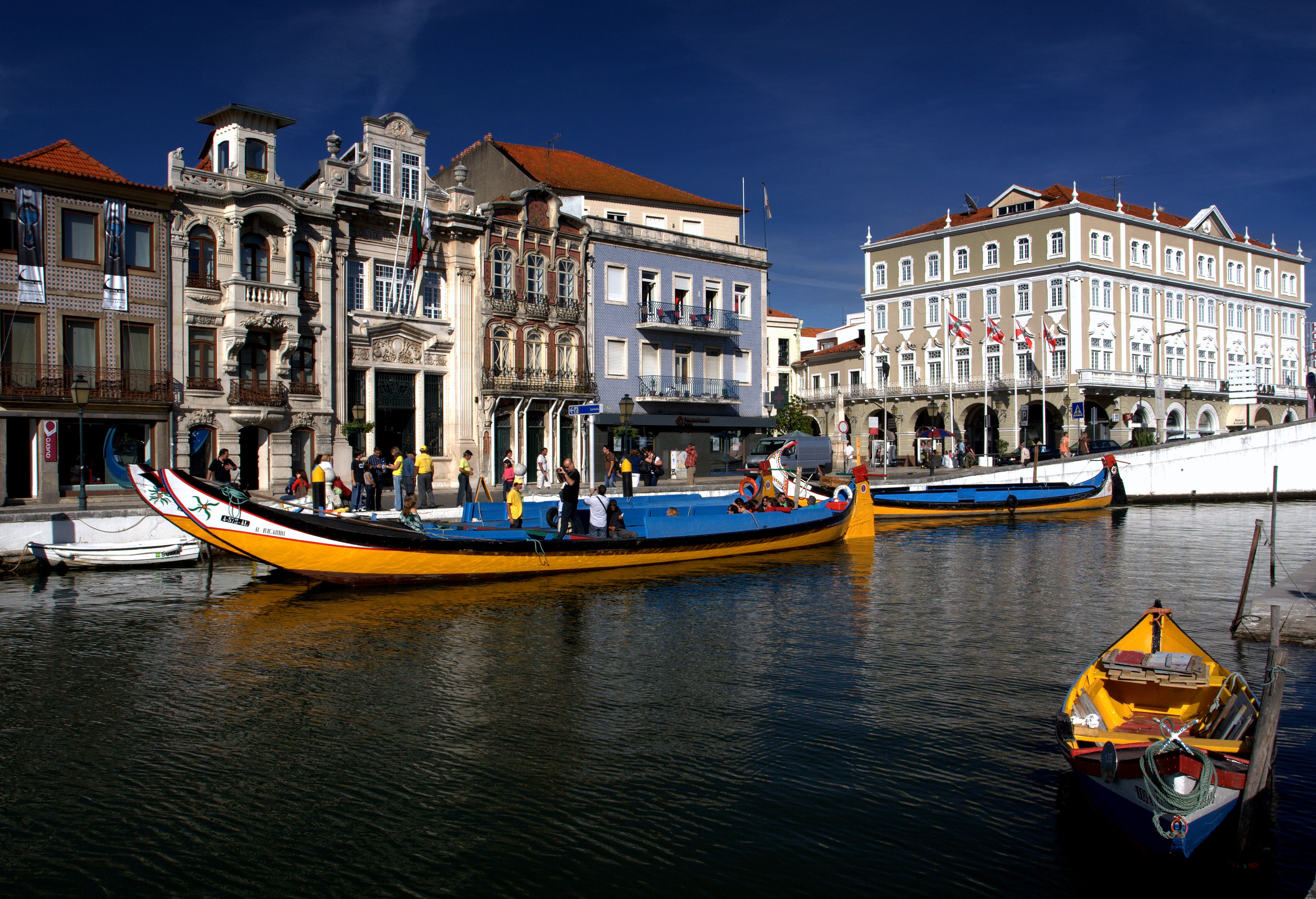
Aveiro, Portugal

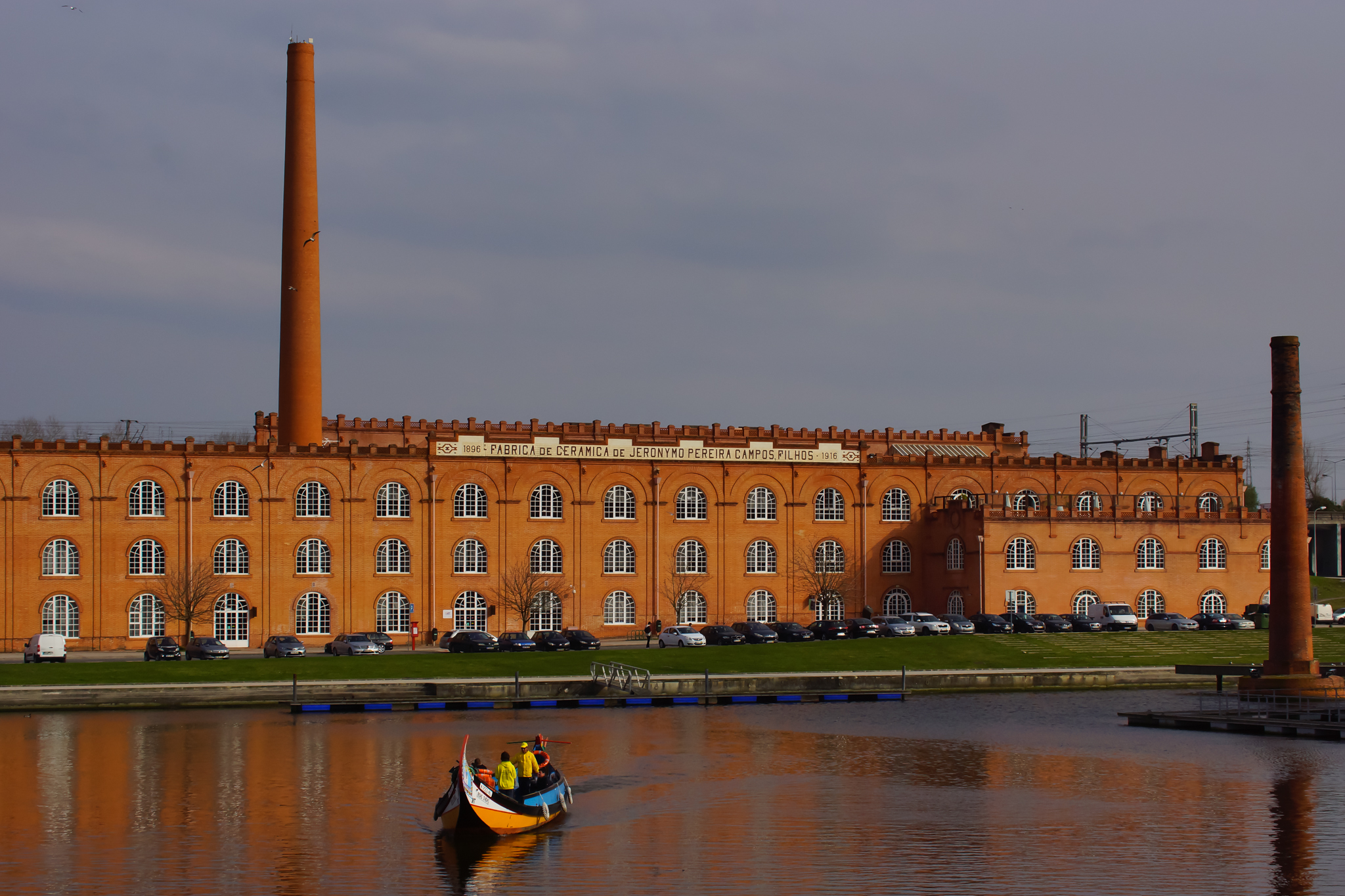
Old ceramics factory

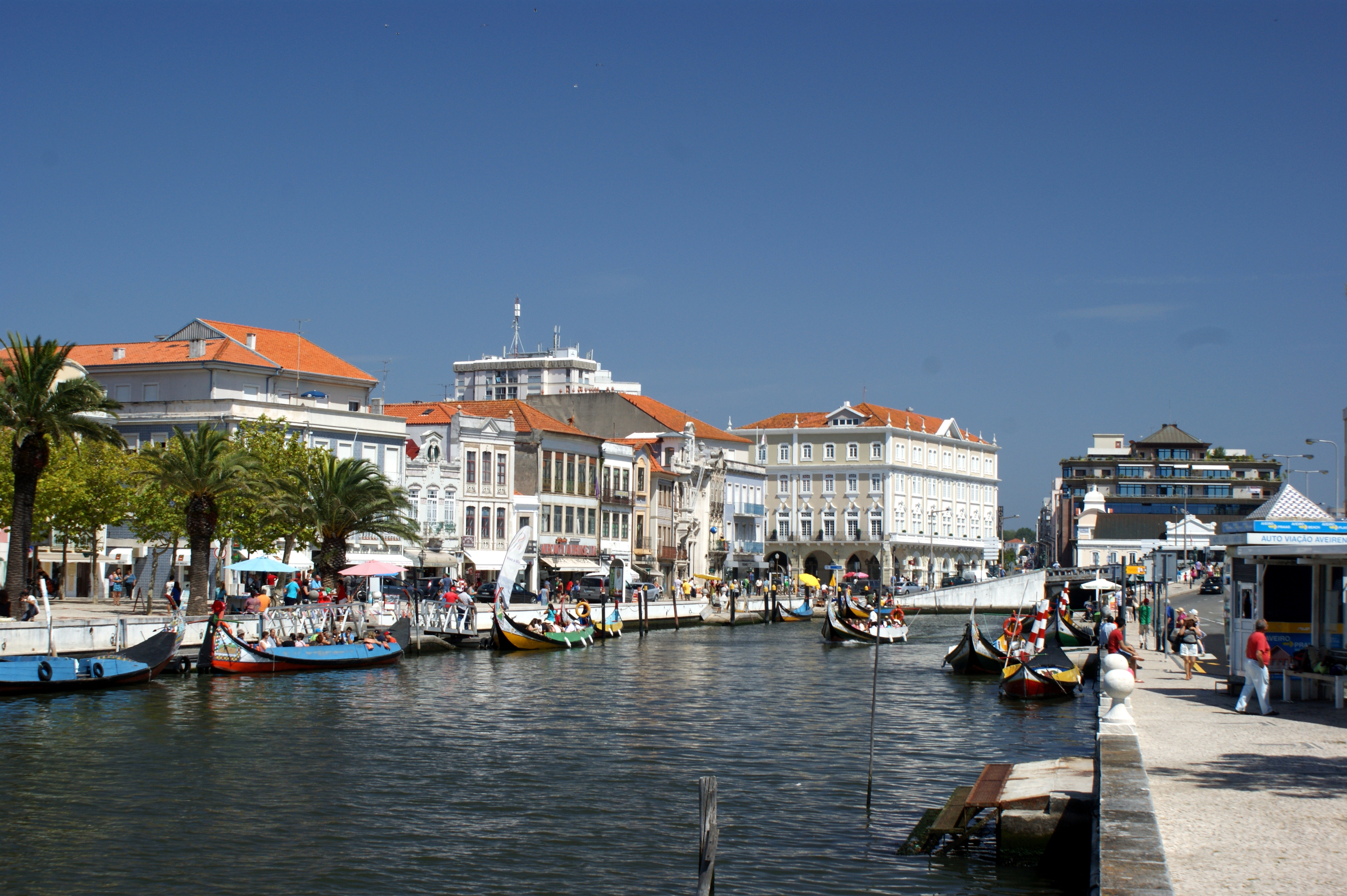
Aveiro, Portugal

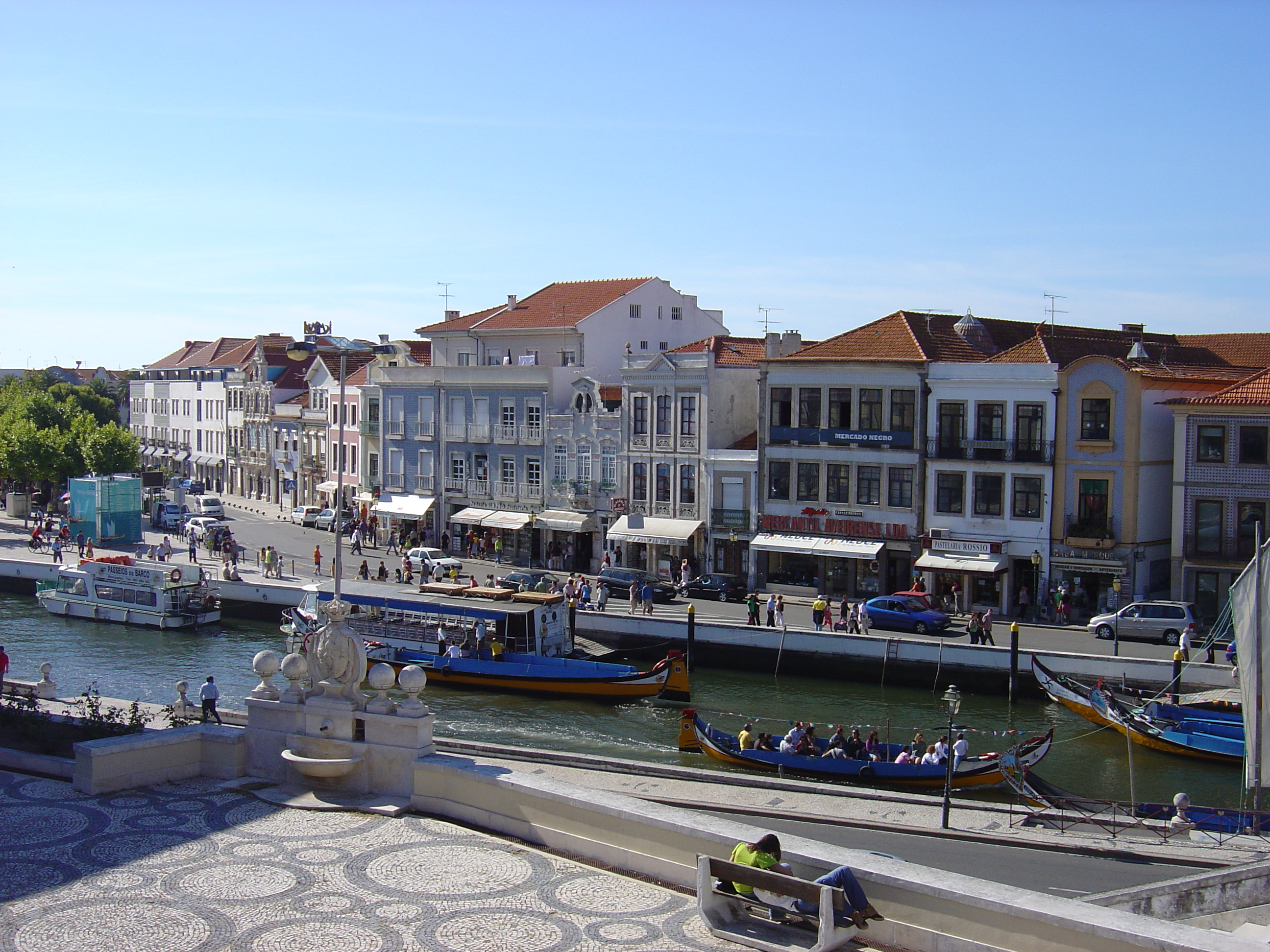
Aveiro, Portugal

Cais da Fonte Nova (Aveiro, Portugal)

== See also ==
- Aveiro Lagoon
- Doutor Lourenço Peixinho Avenue
