= Avocats Sans Frontières =

International NGO active in the human-rights and development sector

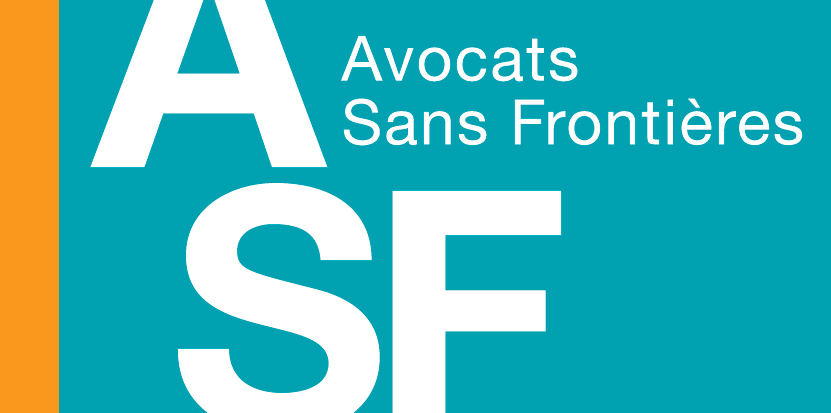
- Founded: 1992
- Purpose: Human rights
- Location: Brussels, Belgium
- Region served: Development aid
- Method: Field interventions, providing access to justice, legal aid and legal assistance
- Key people: Chantal van Cutsem, General Director
- Employees: more than 130 full time staff world-wide
- Website: www.asf.be

Avocats Sans Frontières (ASF), also known in Dutch as Advocaten Zonder Grenzen (English: "Lawyers without Borders"), is an international NGO active in the human rights and development sector. Created in 1992 by a group of Belgian lawyers, ASF's main objective is to advocate for institutions and mechanisms that facilitate access to independent and fair justice systems that ensure legal security and guarantee fundamental human rights.

Avocats Sans Frontières has no affiliation with Lawyers Without Borders, and does not use an English name.

== Awards ==
In 2007, ASF was granted the CCBE Human Rights Award by the Council of Bars and Law Societies of Europe.

In 2009, ASF won the Law and Sustainability Prize of the Association of Flemish Jurists.
