= Antónia Rodrigues =

Portuguese soldier and national heroine

- Born: 1572; Aveiro, Portugal
- Died: 1641 (aged 60–61)
- Allegiance: Kingdom of Portugal

Antónia Rodrigues (Aveiro, Portugal, 1572–1641), was a Portuguese soldier and national heroine.

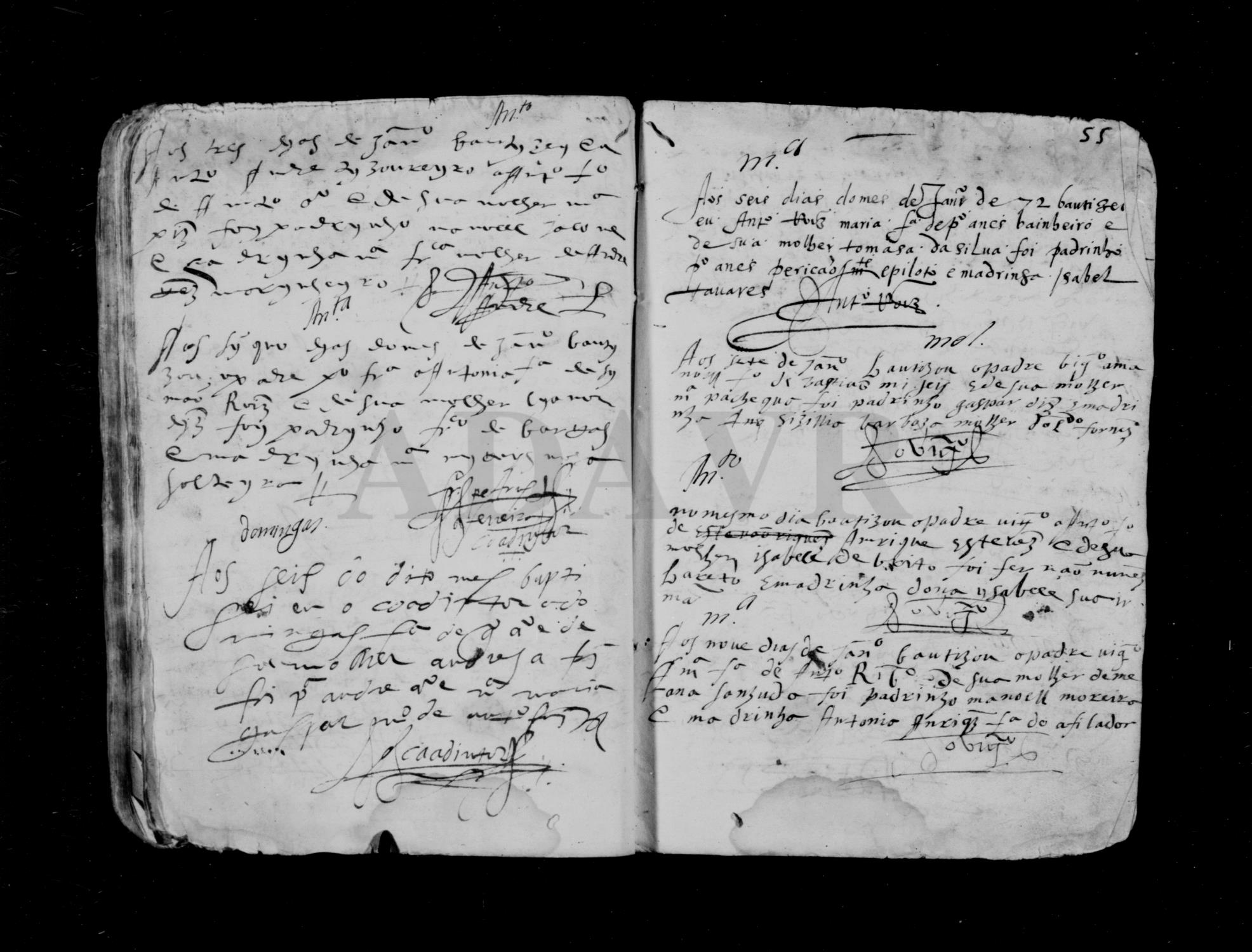
Baptism record of Antónia Rodrigues

Antónia was born in the former parish of Sao Miguel de Aveiro and baptized on 5 January 1572 in a poor home of fishermen, right outside of the city walls of Aveiro. She was the daughter of Simao Rodrigues and Lianor Dias. Her father died in 1574 when she was 2 and, at the age of 12, her mother obligated her to move to Lisbon to live with her older sister and brother-in-law, both of whom she did not get along with. She disliked her housework and fought with them and often ran away from their home. Eager to escape, she dressed herself as a man, cut her hair, and disguised herself and adopted the name of António Rodrigues, the joined a crew as a cabin boy of the ship named Nossa Senhora do Socorro, which loaded with wheat that was heading to the Portuguese territory of Mazagan, in Morocco.

After her arrival at Mazagan she enlisted in the local infantry and acquired skills in weapons handling and achieved command of troops against an invasion of Moors. She made herself noted for her campaigns against the Moors and had a successful military career and was known as "o Terror dos Mouros". After disguising her body and avoiding any advancements from female suitors, Beatriz de Meneses, daughter of Diogo de Mendonca, one of the main nobles who lived in Mazagan, fell in love with "the handsome Antonio Rodrigues", so strongly that Beatriz fell ill and her father, the Chief knight, asked the major captain to force the marriage. Antónia feared being discovered, since it was not customary to refuse good marriages, she confessed that for about 5 years she had been hiding her body in order to have a life that is forbidden to women. The confession reached the governor and Antónia was forced to return as a woman. In 1603, She went on to marry a colleague and was decorated for service by Philip II of Portugal in 1619 in the courts of Madrid. After Philip's death in 1621, she retired from service and lived an anonymous civil life in Portugal and was no longer heard of and died around the year 1641.
