= 2008 Tunisian protests =

Movement against Economic grievances and Unemployment

Location of Gafsa in Tunisia

The 2008 Gafsa strikes, also referred to as the Gafsa Social Movement, Gafsa events or the revolt in the Gafsa mining basin is an important social movement that shook the mining region of southwestern Tunisia—particularly the town of Redeyef, but also Moularès, Métlaoui, and Mdhilla—for nearly six months in 2008. These events took place in the phosphate-rich Gafsa mining basin, 350 kilometers southwest of Tunis, in a central region hard hit by unemployment and poverty. The protests were the most important social unrest known by Tunisia since the “bread riots” in 1983–84 and since the coming to power of President Zine el-Abidine Ben Ali in 1987.

== Protests ==
The 2008 Gafsa movement included demonstrations, work stoppages, hunger strikes, sit-ins, and roadblocks of mining vehicles in protest against the crony capitalist regime of Zine El Abidine Ben Ali and widespread poverty and unemployment in the area. Riots erupted in small villages across mining areas, demanding an end to unemployment.

An anti-government uprising erupted throughout mining towns and rural, poor areas across the country. Thousands protested against mining and poverty in Kasserine, Tataouine, Hammamet, Sfax and Tunis. The protests "paralyzed the industry," and as the Tunisian National Guard and the army were sent in, protesters called for an overall rebellion against president Zine El Abidine Ben Ali. The protests were met with live ammunition, tear gas, water cannons, and birdshot; such brutality was "so severe" and "entrenched" that "ordinary citizens sought revenge for it" afterward. It is often said that the 2008 Gafsa movement was the "spark" of the Tunisian Revolution.

== Media ==
- Footage of the protests
- Footage of the protests 2
