= Rosa Alice Branco =

Portuguese poet

- Born: 1950 (age 75–76); Aveiro, Portugal
- Writing career
- Genre: poet

Rosa Alice Branco (born 1950 in Aveiro) is a Portuguese poet. She is Secretary to the Portuguese PEN Club,

In December 2016, her work Cattle of the Lord was selected as one of the "Top 10 New Books to Read in December" by the highly regarded The Chicago Review of Books. This book translated by Alexis Levitin.

== Selected works ==
- Animais da Terra, Limiar (1988)
- O Desenvolvimento da Filosofia do Sugerir: a Percepção como Operação Interpretativa, tese de mestrado (1990)
- Monadologia Breve, Limiar (1991)
- O Que falta ao Mundo para ser Quadro, Limiar (1993)
- A Mão Feliz. Poemas D(e)ícticos, Limiar (1994)
- O Único Traço de Pincel, Limiar (1997)
- Da Alma e dos Espíritos Animais, Campo das Letras (2001)
- Soletrar o Dia, Quasi Edições (2002)
- Animal Volátil, Edições Afrontamento (2005) - juntamente com Casimiro de Brito
- O Mundo Não Acaba no Frio dos Teus Ossos, Quasi Edições (2009)
- Gado do Senhor, & Etc. (2011)
- Gado e o Gado, & Gado (2018)

=== Works in English ===
- Cattle of the lord : poems, Minneapolis: Milkweed Editions, 2016. ISBN 9781571314826, OCLC 941875625
