= São Jacinto (parish) =

Civil parish in Portugal

- Civil parish
- Location in Portugal
- Coordinates: 40.663°N 8.728°W
- Country: Portugal
- Region: Centro
- Intermunic. comm.: Região de Aveiro
- District: Aveiro
- Municipality: Aveiro

Area
  - Total: 13.84 km^{2} (5.34 sq mi)

Population (2011)
  - Total: 993
  - Density: 72/km^{2} (190/sq mi)
- Time zone: UTC+00:00 (WET)
  - Summer (DST): UTC+01:00 (WEST)

São Jacinto is a civil parish in the municipality of Aveiro, Aveiro District, Portugal. The population in 2011 was 993, in an area of 13.84 km^{2}. It is situated between the Aveiro Lagoon and the Atlantic Ocean. The São Jacinto Dunes Natural Reserve lies north of the village.

== Climate ==
São Jacinto has a warm-summer Mediterranean climate with warm, dry summers and mild, wet winters.

Climate data for São Jacinto Airport, 1961-1990 normals and extremes
Month	Jan	Feb	Mar	Apr	May	Jun	Jul	Aug	Sep	Oct	Nov	Dec	Year
Record high °C (°F)	17.1 (62.8)	18.8 (65.8)	22.6 (72.7)	26.2 (79.2)	31.5 (88.7)	34.8 (94.6)	36.4 (97.5)	36.8 (98.2)	35.8 (96.4)	30 (86)	23.6 (74.5)	20.0 (68.0)	36.8 (98.2)
Mean daily maximum °C (°F)	13.8 (56.8)	14.4 (57.9)	15.9 (60.6)	16.8 (62.2)	18.4 (65.1)	20.8 (69.4)	22.2 (72.0)	22.0 (71.6)	21.9 (71.4)	20.0 (68.0)	16.8 (62.2)	14.4 (57.9)	18.1 (64.6)
Daily mean °C (°F)	10.0 (50.0)	10.8 (51.4)	12.1 (53.8)	13.2 (55.8)	15.1 (59.2)	17.3 (63.1)	18.6 (65.5)	18.3 (64.9)	18.1 (64.6)	16.2 (61.2)	12.9 (55.2)	10.6 (51.1)	14.4 (58.0)
Mean daily minimum °C (°F)	6.3 (43.3)	7.2 (45.0)	8.2 (46.8)	9.6 (49.3)	11.6 (52.9)	13.8 (56.8)	15.0 (59.0)	14.6 (58.3)	14.2 (57.6)	12.4 (54.3)	9.1 (48.4)	6.9 (44.4)	10.7 (51.3)
Record low °C (°F)	−2.0 (28.4)	−1.4 (29.5)	−1.5 (29.3)	0.8 (33.4)	4.0 (39.2)	7.6 (45.7)	9.0 (48.2)	5.0 (41.0)	6.5 (43.7)	2.6 (36.7)	0.6 (33.1)	−1.8 (28.8)	−2.0 (28.4)
Average precipitation mm (inches)	113.7 (4.48)	122.6 (4.83)	72.5 (2.85)	69.1 (2.72)	58.7 (2.31)	29.8 (1.17)	9.4 (0.37)	10.4 (0.41)	36.1 (1.42)	80.8 (3.18)	111.1 (4.37)	126.8 (4.99)	841 (33.1)
Average precipitation days (≥ 0.1 mm)	16.3	15.3	14.2	13.6	11.6	8.4	3.9	4.0	7.6	11.9	14.8	13.8	135.4
Average relative humidity (%)	80	79	74	74	75	76	77	79	79	78	79	80	78
Source: Instituto de Meteorologia
