= Alaa Talbi =

Tunisian activist, academic and poet (born 1978)

Alaa Talbi علاء الطالبي
- Born: 4 April 1978 (age 48); Kasserine, Tunisia
- Known for: Human Rights activism

Alaa Talbi (Arabic: علاء الطالبي) is a Tunisian Civil Society and human Rights activist. He was born in Kasserine, on April 4, 1978.

Alaa currently occupies the position of Chief Executive in the Tunisian Forum for Economic and Social Rights - FTDES, in which he advocates for specific issues such as social movements, women rights and empowerment, and immigrants. He is part of other international and regional organisations as a founding or board member; such as the Tunisian affiliate of the Canadian foundation Alternatives.

== Civil society and activism ==
=== Migration and marginalisation ===
Alaa Talbi highlighted several times the risk of the gap that exists between the government's agenda and the issues claimed by youth in the regions and the marginalisation of youth in political parties as well. During the set up of the democratic transition, the Instance of Truth and Dignity, declared some regions as victim-regions. Alaa, originally from Kasserine, submitted the request by the Tunisian Forum for Economic and Social Right - FTDES with the support of the Belgian organisation Lawyers Without Borders - ASF. Kasserine, marginalised and poorly developed governorate, was the first in the list of victim-regions. Another topic carried by Talbi; the phenomenon of suicide and suicide attempts among students in schools and adults.

=== Human and women’s rights ===
In addition to his position as Chief Executive for the FTDES, Talbi is the legal representative of the Libyan Center for Human Rights - Mudafa and the treasurer of Tunis affiliate of the Tunisian Human Rights League.

As a Human Rights activist, Alaa works to advocate for several cases such as women workers’ rights, racism, human trafficking and child abuse.

He took part in the Free Jabeur campaign, and the mobilisation for a white march for the case of Eya, a girl burned by her father as an honor-killing.

=== Social movements ===
Social movements are increasing since the Jasmine Revolution. The number of social protests keeps increasing gradually since then. Talbi as well as other civil society activists, tries to raise the issues for solutions, highlighting the importance of a peaceful negotiation between the protesters and the government without the involvement of the army.

He published many statements on behalf of the FTDES to criticise the systematic policy of targeting social activists and protestors.

=== World social forum ===
In addition to the Tunisian Forum for Social and Economic Rights - FTDES, Talbi is a board member in several international organisations such as the Tunisian Social Forum, the Maghreb Social Forum, the African Social Forum, Social Forum for Free Media, and the World Social Forum.

A month after the assassination of Chokri Belaid in 2013, Talbi was part of the organising committee of the World Social Forum that was maintained in Tunis. The forum gathered more than 30 000 attendees from all over the world in support to Tunisia and about 1100 Tunisian organisations.

Although the year of 2015 had known several terrorist attacks in Tunisia, Talbi and other civil society activists brought the World Social Forum to the country again. A day after the Bardo Attack, Alaa Talbi confirmed in a public statement the organisation of the WSF and its march with a destination the Bardo Museum. During that edition, few tensions took place with the Algerian delegation; who were previously not allowed by their authorities to participate in the Forum.

== Academic life and publications ==
=== Academia ===
Alaa Talbi is known as an academia and researcher as well specialised in Mongolian and Mamluk studies. He taught History of Media at the Institute of Applied Studies for Humanities in Jendouba University.

Talbi has a PhD in Medieval History from the Faculty of humanities and social sciences in Tunis and Ecole Pratique des Hautes Etudes in Paris. Previously, he defended his master thesis entitled “The Mongolian presence in the Mamluk space (1258-1335)” in the Faculty of Arts and Humanities of Manouba, Tunisia.

Prior to that, Talbi had released some academic essays and critical lectures: In 2012, an essay about the typology of fear for a population appeared in a book entitled "Bilād al-Šām facing the outside worlds" by Denise Aigle.

A study of the diplomacy in wartime between the Persian Mongols and the Egyptian Mamluks appeared in 2007. In the same year, he published as well a critical lecture "Reuven Amitai, The Mongols in the Islamic Lands, Studies in the History of the Ilkhanate".

=== Poetry and literature ===
Alaa Talbi is also known for his poetry in Arabic and in Tunisian dialect as well; where he publishes under a nickname “Weld ElHafyena” as a tribute to his mother and all women in the marginalised regions of Tunisia. In 2013, he wrote “Neirouz’s smile” as a tribute to his friend Chokri Belaid, assassinated earlier that year. The poem was sung by Ghalia Benali.

One of his poems "and now we have murdered you" (Arabic: قتلناك) was awarded and translated into French then published in 2013 along with other authors’ texts and poems in “Tunisia Diaspora: Exils and Dialogues”.
