= Moularès, Tunisia =

Moulares Om Laarayes
- Commune and town
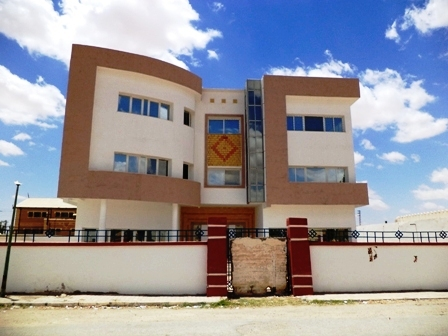
- Cyper Parc Moulares

- Location within Tunisia
- Coordinates: 34.50°N 8.27°E
- Country: Tunisia
- Governorate: Gafsa Governorate

Population (2014)
  - Total: 21,716
- Time zone: UTC+1 (CET)

Moularès (Arabic: أم العرائس; romanized: Om Laarayes) is a town and commune in the Gafsa Governorate, Tunisia. At the 2004 census, it had a population of 24,487.

The town's economy has been dominated by phosphate mining since the early 20th century. A railway line was built to transport the ore to Sfax, where it is processed and exported.

== See also ==
- List of cities in Tunisia
