= Santa Joana (parish) =

Civil parish in Portugal

- Civil parish
- Location in Portugal
- Coordinates: 40.632°N 8.619°W
- Country: Portugal
- Region: Centro
- Intermunic. comm.: Região de Aveiro
- District: Aveiro
- Municipality: Aveiro

Area
  - Total: 5.85 km^{2} (2.26 sq mi)

Population (2011)
  - Total: 8,094
  - Density: 1,400/km^{2} (3,600/sq mi)
- Time zone: UTC+00:00 (WET)
  - Summer (DST): UTC+01:00 (WEST)

Santa Joana is a civil parish in Aveiro Municipality, Aveiro District, Portugal. The population in 2011 was 8,094, in an area of 5.85 km^{2}.
