= Lawyers Without Borders =

U.S.-based non-profit organization

- Founded: 2000
- Founder: Christina M. Storm
- Purpose: Human rights
- Location: New Haven, Connecticut, U.S.
- Region served: Rule of Law
- Method: Field interventions, providing access to justice, legal aid and legal assistance
- Funding: Third party donations and pro bono work
- Employees: 27 full time employees
- Website: lawyerswithoutborders.org

Lawyers Without Borders (LWOB) is an international non-profit organization founded in 2000 by Connecticut Attorney, Christina M. Storm, which operates worldwide from its central headquarters located in New Haven, Connecticut, U.S. Its single affiliate, Lawyers Without Borders UK, was founded in 2003 and is headquartered in London, having acquired UK charity status in June 2010. Lawyers from around the world are engaged as volunteers either individually or through their employers (usually either a law firm or an in-house department) who support LWOB as pro bono partners. To date, the countries which contribute the largest number of lawyer volunteers to LWOB field work are the United States, Canada, the United Kingdom and Australia.

The two organizations share the goal of engaging the legal profession in internationally oriented pro bono rule of law work. They support capacity building in the judicial sector of developing nations and regions emerging from conflict through training of judges and lawyers in trial advocacy. The organizations utilize a week-long intense training using mock scenarios in the following contexts: Criminal Law (general), Trafficking in Persons, Inheritance & Succession and Gender Based and Domestic Violence. Other major program areas include: Neutral Trial Observation, Assessment and Evaluation, Technical Assistance (Roadmaps, Manuals, Legal Analysis, Research and Legislative Drafting) and Community Outreach. Community work is focused upon access to justice issues and to date have included themes of civic participation and engagement, rights based education in partnership with local (in-country) NGOs and rights-based education embedded in LWOB supported and managed micro-enterprise.

LWOB integrates major pro bono components in the form of resources and volunteer with the self-funded participation of highly skilled and committed lawyers in nearly all of its programming. This system evaluates the specialized skills of each volunteer and places them into a program after considering and evaluating the following criteria: legal expertise, years in practice, time availability, orientation, language skills and international travel and or living experience. LWOB's programs are typically funded by third party foundations and grant making agencies and typically contain "cost-share" components, leveraging donated human resources and in-kind support.

The organization's orientation is strictly neutral; like the Red Cross and Médecins Sans Frontières, it does not engage in "watch-dog" advocacy. It does not use media or publicity to bring attention to its work in-country and for the safety of its lawyers and integrity of its in-country work often conducts its programming well below the radar of the international press. This approach has helped LWOB gain the respect of governments and authorities who may have otherwise limited in-country engagement of international NGOs. LWOB's programming and models have been implemented throughout Africa (Liberia, Kenya, Ethiopia, Namibia, Cameroon, Tanzania, Mozambique, Rwanda and Uganda). Regions outside Africa where work has been conducted or is planned include: Kyrgyzstan, China, Albania, India.

== Student divisions ==
As of January 2021, there are 29 formally approved Student Divisions of Lawyers without Borders, including at the University of Bristol (UK), the University of Exeter, Durham University (UK), Cambridge University (UK), The London School of Economics (UK), Brooklyn Law School (US), New York Law School (US), Oxford University (UK), City University of London, the School of Oriental and African Studies (UK), UConn (Undergraduate), University of Aberdeen (UK), and the Queensland University of Technology (AUS). In the past, LWOB has engaged law students through less formal collaborations at UToronto, UMiami, College of Law (UK), and UConn Law. LWOB offers in-house internships to up to 30 students each year over the course of three terms: Fall, Winter/Spring and Summer. Some virtual internships are available each year and in-country placements are generally available for periods of between 6–12 months in Kenya, Liberia and the United Kingdom.

Lawyers Without Borders is an official "Without Borders" trademark-protected organization. It has no affiliation with Avocats Sans Frontières or Doctors Without Borders.

Lawyers Without Borders is commonly known by its United Nations acronym, LWOB.

== Mission statement ==
To advance global rule of law, build capacity and integrity in the world's justice sectors, and support transitions and development. LWOB engage with lawyers and judges dedicated to pro bono service and integrate them into initiatives that directly or indirectly serve the underserved, protect the disadvantaged, and promote human rights.

LWOB's objective is to develop programs that improve access to justice guided by a mandate of neutrality and independence.
