= Benfica (disambiguation) =

S.L. Benfica or simply Benfica is a professional football club based in Lisbon, Portugal.

Benfica may also refer to:

== Places ==
- Benfica, Luanda, a commune of Luanda, Angola
- Benfica, Rio de Janeiro, a neighborhood in Rio de Janeiro, Brazil
- Benfica, Lisbon, a civil parish of Lisbon, Portugal

== Sports clubs ==
- Casa Estrella del Benfica, a football club from Andorra la Vella, Andorra
- S.H. Benfica (Huambo), a football club from Huambo, Angola
- S.L. Benfica (Luanda), a football club from Luanda, Angola
- S.L. Benfica (Lubango), a football club from Lubango, Angola
- CSD Benfica, a football club from Dili, East Timor
- Benfica W.S.C., a women's association football club in Ireland
- FC RM Hamm Benfica, a football club from Luxembourg City, Luxembourg
- S.L. Benfica de Macau, a football club from Macau
- Sport Macúti e Benfica, a football club from Beira, Mozambique
- Sport Benfica e Castelo Branco, a football club from Castelo Branco, Portugal
- C.F. Benfica, a sports club from Lisbon, Portugal
- Sport London e Benfica F.C., a football club from London, England, UK

== See also ==
- Benfica do Ribatejo, a civil parish in Almeirim, Portugal
- S.L. Benfica (disambiguation)
- São Domingos de Benfica, a civil parish of Lisbon split off from the original Benfica in 1959
