= List of football clubs in Mozambique =

The following is an incomplete list of association football clubs based in Mozambique. For a complete list see Category:Football clubs in Mozambique

== A ==
- Atlético Muçulmano da Matola

== C ==
- CD Costa do Sol (Maputo)
- CD Matchedje de Maputo
- CD Maxaquene (Maputo)
- Clube Ferroviário da Beira
- Clube Ferroviário de Maputo

== D ==
- Desportivo Chimoio

== E ==
- Estrella Beira

== G ==
- GD HCB de Songo (Songo)
- Grupo Desportivo de Maputo

== I ==
- Incomáti de Xinavane

== J ==
- Juventus Manica

== L ==
- Liga Muçulmana de Maputo

== M ==
- Matchedje Nampula

== N ==
- Nova Alianca Maputo

== P ==
- Palmeiras Quelimane

== R ==
- Romos Maputo

== S ==
- Silmo Mocuba
- Sporting Clube da Beira
- Sport Macúti e Benfica
- Sport Quelimane e Benfica

== T ==
- Textáfrica
