= S.L. Benfica (disambiguation) =

S.L. Benfica (Sport Lisboa e Benfica) is a Portuguese multi-sport club, best known for its association football team.

S.L. Benfica may also refer to:

- S.L. Benfica B, the reserve team
- S.L. Benfica (youth), the youth academy
- S.L. Benfica (women's football)
- S.L. Benfica (futsal)
- S.L. Benfica (basketball)
- S.L. Benfica (roller hockey)
- S.L. Benfica (handball)
- S.L. Benfica (volleyball)
- S.L. Benfica (rugby union)
- S.L. Benfica (cycling team)
- S.L. Benfica (athletics)
- S.L. Benfica (beach soccer)
- S.L. Benfica (swimming)
- S.L. Benfica (archery)
- S.L. Benfica (table tennis)

== Other football teams ==
- S.L. Benfica (Luanda)
- S.L. Benfica (Lubango)
- S.H. Benfica (Huambo)
- S.L. Benfica de Macau
- S.L. Benfica (Libolo) (basketball)
- Sport London e Benfica F.C.

== See also ==
- Benfica (disambiguation)
