= Palmeiras (disambiguation) =

Sociedade Esportiva Palmeiras is a Brazilian football team.

Palmeiras may also refer to:

== Football teams ==
- Sociedade Esportiva Palmeiras (women's football), the female section of the main Palmeiras club
- Palmeiras Nordeste Futebol, a Brazilian football team
- Associação Atlética das Palmeiras, a defunct Brazilian football team
- Palmeiras Quelimane, a Mozambican football club

== Places ==
- Palmeiras, Bahia
- Palmeiras de Goiás
- Palmeiras do Tocantins

== See also ==
- Palmeiras River (disambiguation)
- Palmares (disambiguation)
