= Nova Alianca Maputo =

- Full name: Grupo Desportivo Nova Alianca
- Ground: Alyans; Maputo, Mozambique
- Capacity: 10,000
- League: Mocambola3 Liga 3 (2008)
- 2008: 11

Grupo Desportivo Nova Alianca , usually known simply as Nova Alianca, is a traditional football (soccer) club based in Maputo, Mozambique.

== Stadium ==
The club plays their home matches at Alyans since 2008 at Ferroviario das Mahotas], which has a maximum capacity of 10,000 people.
