= Portuguese Beach Soccer League =

The Portuguese Beach Soccer League was a summer team sport event in Portugal. This was the result of an effort by the Portuguese District Football Associations of Algarve, Castelo Branco, Leiria, Lisbon, Porto and Setúbal, in cooperation with several local and national entities.

The competition occurred between the months of May and July in four stages around the country. The biggest clubs that participated in this event were: Porto, Boavista, Benfica, Sporting CP and Vitória de Setúbal.

After 2010 this competition was exctint and replaced by Circuito Nacional de Futebol de Praia.

== Winner ==
Portuguese Beach Soccer League
Season	Winners	Score	Runners-up
2005	Porto	4–3	Sporting CP
2006	Benfica	6–5	Sporting CP
2007	Benfica	6–3	União de Leiria
2008	Vitória de Setúbal	5–4	União de Leiria
2009	União de Leiria	5–2	Rio Ave
2010	Vitória de Setúbal	3–2	Porto

== Performance by club ==
Club	Winners	Runners-up	Winning years and Runners-up years
Benfica	2	–	2006, 2007
Vitória de Setúbal	2	–	2008, 2010
União de Leiria	1	2	2009, 2007, 2008
Porto	1	1	2005, 2010
Sporting CP	–	2	2005, 2006
Rio Ave	–	1	2009

== See also ==
- Circuito Nacional de Futebol de Praia
