= Almeirim =

- Municipality
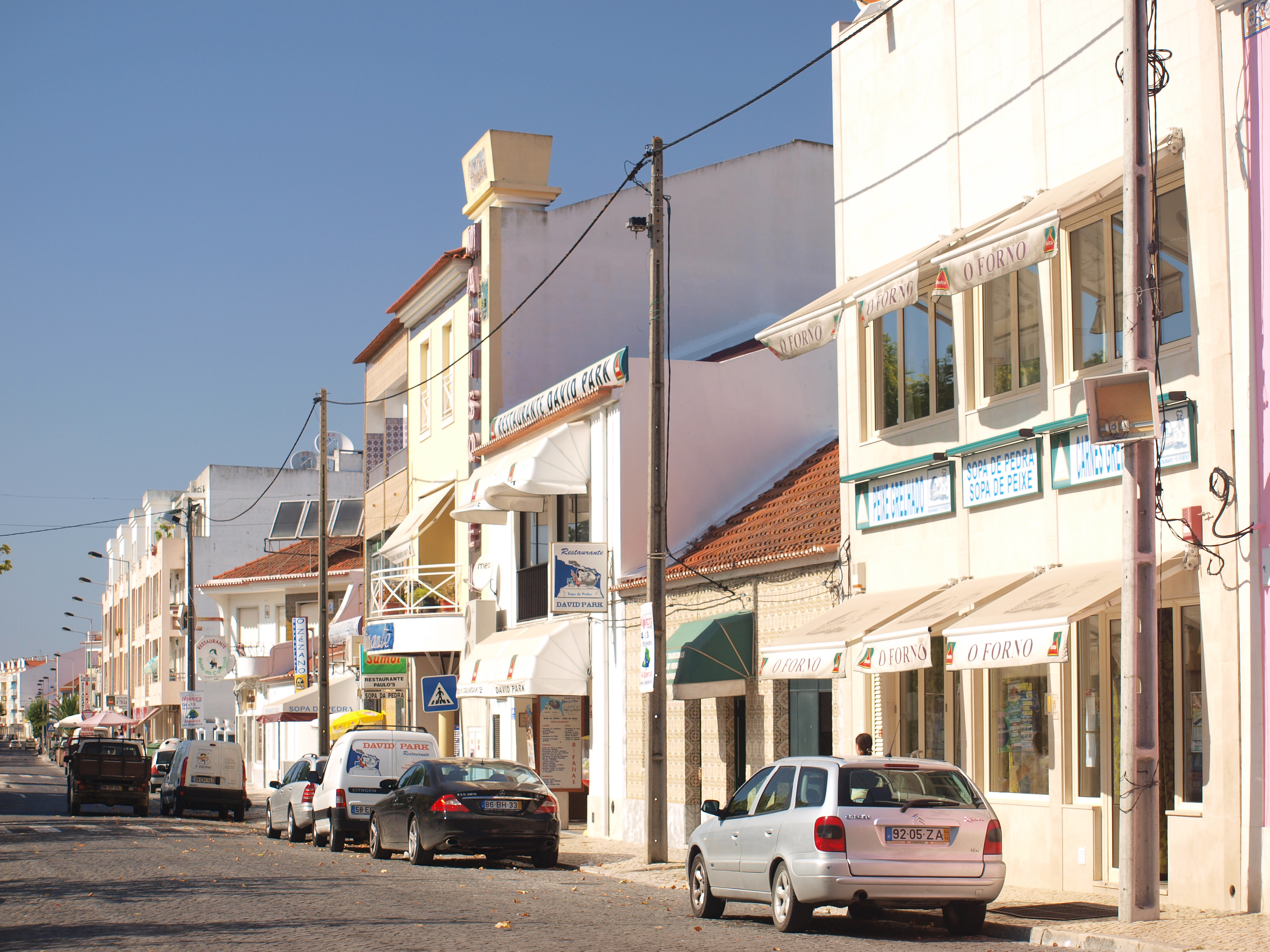
- View of Almeirim

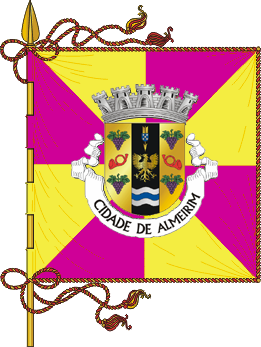
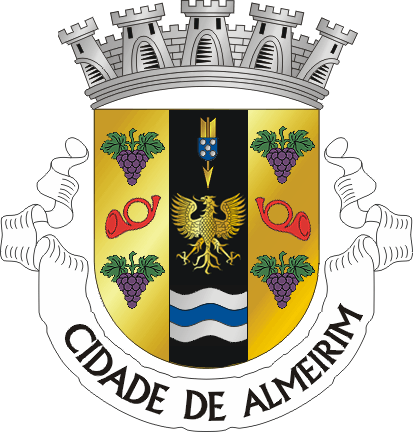
- Flag Coat of arms
- Interactive map of Almeirim
- Location in Portugal
- Coordinates: 39°12′N 8°37′W
- Country: Portugal
- Region: Oeste e Vale do Tejo
- Intermunic. comm.: Lezíria do Tejo
- District: Santarém
- Parishes: 4

Government
  - President: Pedro Ribeiro (PS)

Area
  - Total: 222.12 km^{2} (85.76 sq mi)

Population (2011)
  - Total: 23,376
  - Density: 105.24/km^{2} (272.57/sq mi)
- Time zone: UTC+00:00 (WET)
  - Summer (DST): UTC+01:00 (WEST)
- Local holiday: Ascension Day
- Website: www.cm-almeirim.pt

Almeirim (European Portuguese pronunciation: [almɐjˈɾĩ]) is a city and a municipality in Santarém District, Portugal. The population in 2011 was 23,376, in an area of 222.12 km^{2}. The city proper had a population of 10,520 in 2001.

== History ==
There are vestiges of mid-Paleolithic to Mesolithic period along the territory, including traces from Neolithic, Calcolithic and Bronze Age remnants. The Iron Age also marked this region, with archaeological excavations unearthing settlements and artefacts.

Roman legions of Décimo Junius Brutus occupied the territory, following the Tagus upstream and disembarking in Santarém, where they left their marks. These, along with other groups, occupied arable lands, beginning in the first century A.D. This included the development of agriculture (particularly wheat and olive orchards) and raising of cattle, supporting the establishment of Almeirim along the margins of the Tagus.

References to this municipality, began appearing in the 14th century. With rich lands, the territory supported hunting, extending to Santarém, and proximities of the Tagus and Lisbon. This easy access, made Almeirim a preferred place for the Kings of the second Dynasty, and a winter place frequented by members of Corte, becoming known as the Sintra of Winter. Almeirim, therefore, became an ideal place for relaxation, palace intrigue and romantic encounters in the royal gardens, mixed with resolutions of important negotiations.

King John I, between 1411 and 1423, ordered the construction of a (castellated) royal palace and first residences that contributed to the establishment of the town, with the work to the Al-meirim, that included landscaping, drainage and earthen-works.

In 1483, Almeirim was elevated to the status of municipality, wherein he bestowed a concession on its residents. As a consequence, in 1490, its first almoxarife (sheriff) Álvaro Pires Borges was assigned by King D. John II from the royal guard.

In 1500, the Church of São João Baptista was constructed.

The palace was expanded and improved by Manuel I of Portugal who was in Almeirim several times: in 1510, part of 1513, Christmas of 1514 and all the period between October 1515 and May 1516. John III of Portugal followed his example, and spent similar time in Almeirim. He ordered the construction of a royal palace near the Ribeira de Muge (Muja or Mugem), that became known as Paço da Ribeira de Muge and later, the Paço dos Negros, then later the Convent of Nossa Senhora da Serra.

King Sebastian, who frequently visited Almeirim, created a dynastic succession crisis with his disappearance at the Battle of Alcácer-Quibir. Without a successor, the Cortes of Almeirim was opened by Cardinal Henry on 11 January 1580, to decide on the problem of succession. During the Cortes, Febo Moniz, as magistrate of Lisbon, directed his response to the Cardinal, stating "Give this your Highness to a Portuguese prince and all will kiss his hand". But, little was resolved, and the Kingdom eventually began to be governed by Philip II of Spain, beginning the reign of Phillipian Dynastic Union, until 1 December 1640.

At the time Almeirim was visited as a winter resort, where many passed through the roads of the burgh and stayed at the Royal Palace. Gil Vicente, the father of Portuguese theatre, presented many of his farses, comedies and plays, for example "Auto da Fé" in 1510; "Barca da Glória" in 1519; tragic-comedy "Dom Dardos" at the marriage of Infanta D. Isabel with Charles V, in 1525; and in 1526 he presented the farse "O Juiz da Beira", the tragic-comedy "Templo de Apolo", "Breve Sumário da História de Deus" and "Diálogo sobre a Ressurreição". It was also in the palace the Garcia de Resende began printing his Cancioneiro Geral.

In the Memórias Paroquiais (1758) the resident population was just over 302 neighbours.

With the inauguration of the D. Luís bridge in 1881, the connection between Almeirim and Santarém, allowed a significant change in the economy.

In 1935, the Casa do Povo, health centre and dispensary were inaugurated. By the middle of the century (1953), the bullring, a social centre of annual activities was also open to the public.

On 20 June 1991, the settlement was elevated to the status of city.

The municipal assembly approved ARU02, designating the Área de Reabilitação Urbana (Urban Rehabilitation Area) for Almeirim (8902/2014, Diário da República, 147, Série 1) in order to modernize and recuperate many of the historic buildings in the town.

== Geography ==
The administrative division of civil parishes within the municipality of Almeirim

Almeirim is situated 70 kilometres (43 mi) from Lisbon, and 7 kilometres (4.3 mi) in Santarém; its neighbours include Alpiarça (to the north), Chamusca (in the east and northeast), Salvaterra da Magos, Coruche (both in the south), Santarém (in the northwest) and Cartaxo (in the south). The municipality is situated on a plain along the Tagus Valley and Lezíria, approximately 3.5 kilometres (2.2 mi) along the left bank of the Tagus River. The morphology of the terrain is marked by a planar relief with little forests, with cultivation interspersed between pastures and vineyards.

The municipality of Almeirim is subdivided into the following 4 parishes:

- Almeirim
- Benfica do Ribatejo
- Fazendas de Almeirim
- Raposa

Two main roadways support the population of Almeirim: the EN114 and EN118, in addition to the inter-community IC10. The construction of the Salgueiro Maia bridge and A13 bridge serves and reinforces the privileged location of Almeirim, in addition to constant traffic from Santarém and the rest of the country.

== Economy ==
The mainstay of the economy is agriculture, including wine making and modern industry of alimentary products such as fruit juices, processed tomato and canned vegetables (Compal).

== Architecture ==
=== Civic ===
- Bridge of Raposa (Portuguese: Ponte da Raposa)
- Building of the Wine/Vineyard Institute of Almeirim (Portuguese: Edifício do Instituto da Vinha e do Vinho de Almeirim)
- Building of the Almeirim CTT (Portuguese: Edifício dos Correios, Telégrafos e Telefones, CTT, de Almeirim)
- Bullring of Almeirim (Portuguese: Praça de Touros de Almeirim)
- Cemetery of Almeirim (Portuguese: Cemetério de Almeirim)
- Cinema-Theatre of Almeirim (Portuguese: Cine-Teatro de Almeirim)
- Fountain of São Roque (Portuguese: Fonte de São Roque/Fonte dos Namorados)
- Hospital of the Misericórida of Almeirim (Portuguese: Hospital da Santa Casa da Misericórdia de Almeirim)
- Municipal Market of Almeirim (Portuguese: Mercado Municipal de Almeirim)
- National Republican Guard Post of Almeirim (Portuguese: Posto da Guarda Nacional Republicana, GNR, de Almeirim/Tribunal Judicial de Almeirim)
- Palace of the Marquesses of Alorna (Portuguese: Palácio dos Marqueses de Alorna/Casa da Quinta de Vale de Nabais)
- Portico of paço dos Negros (Portuguese: Pórtico de Paço dos Negros/Paço dos Negros da Ribeira de Muge)
- Residence of Quinta de Santa Maria (Portuguese: Casa da Quinta de Santa Maria)
- Residence of the Cortes of Almeirim (Portuguese: Casa das Cortes de Almeirim)
- Residential Home of São José (Portuguese: Lar Residencial de São José)

=== Religious ===
- Church of Santa Marta (Portuguese: Igreja Paroquial de Benfica do Ribatejo/Igreja de Santa Marta)
- Church of São António (Portuguese: Igreja Paroquial da Raposa/Igreja de Santo António)
- Church of São João Baptista (Portuguese: Igreja Paroquial de Almeirim/Igreja de São João Baptista)
- Convent of Serra (Portuguese: Convento da Serra)
- Monastery of the Third Order of São Francisco of Almeirim (Portuguese: Mosteiro da Ordem Terceira de São Francisco de Almeirim/Escolas Velhas)

== Culture ==
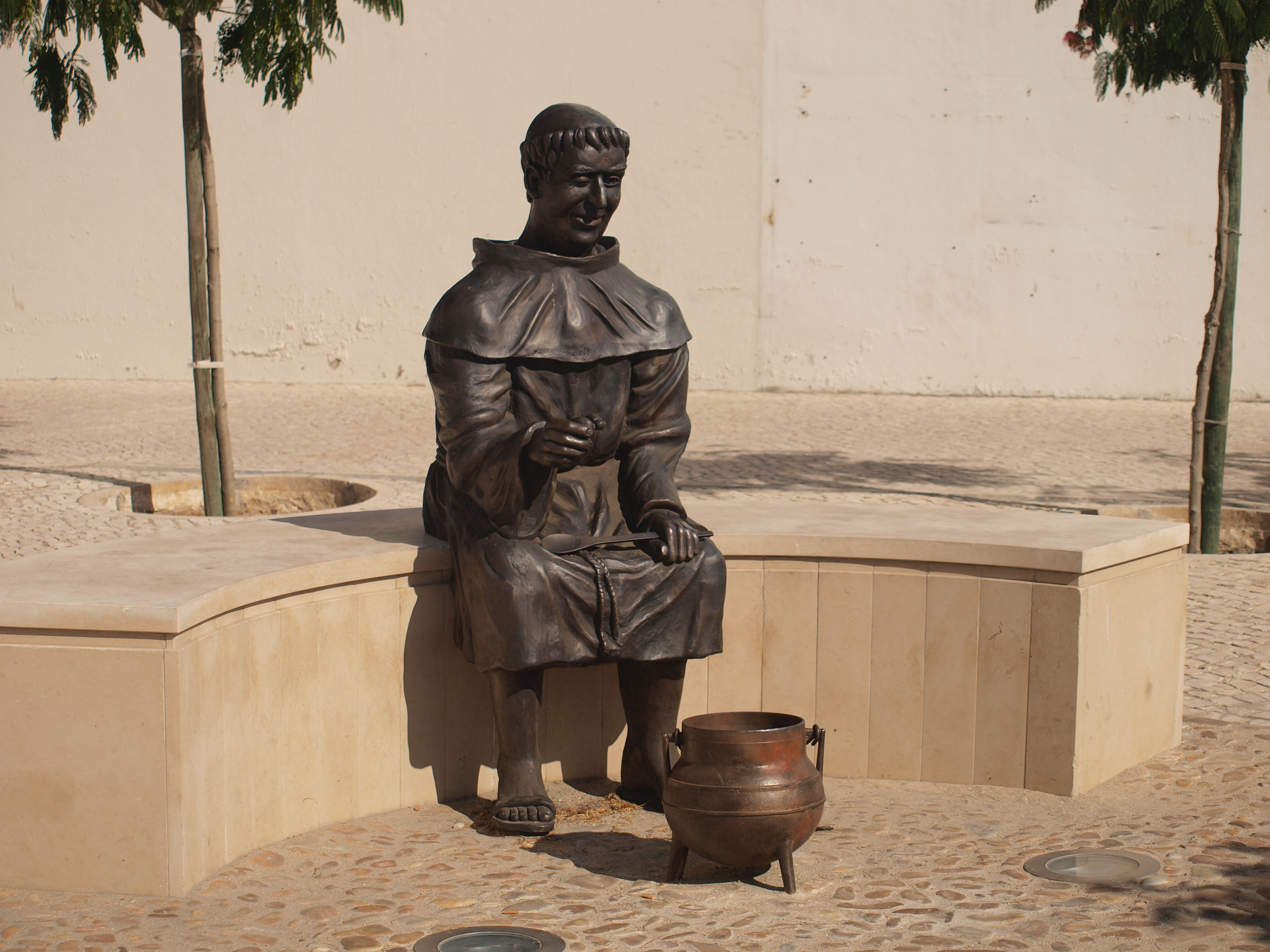
Statue of the friar in Almeirim

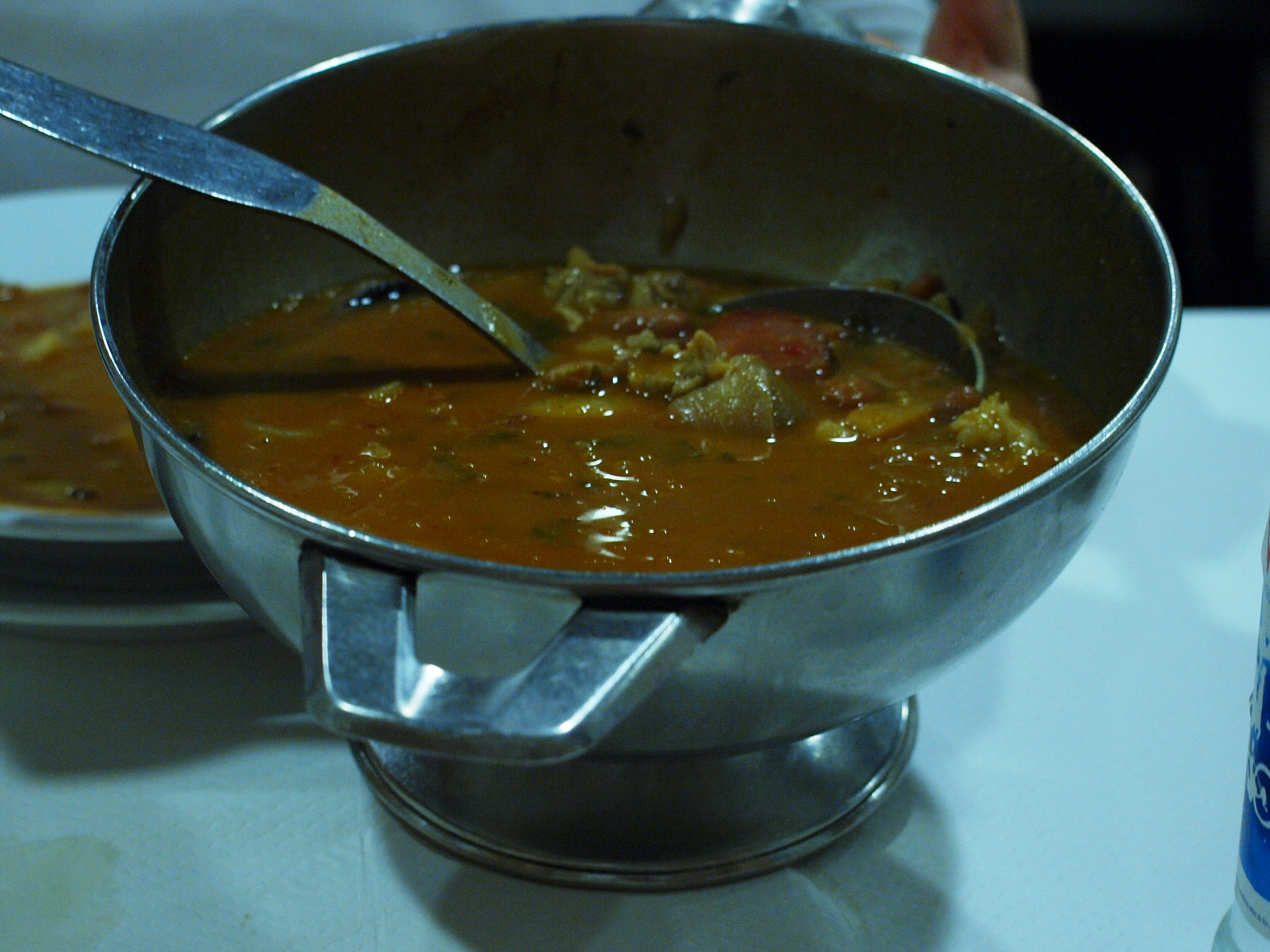
A Bowl of Stone Soup

The city is also known for its gastronomy, to which Stone Soup is just one great example. According to the people of Almeirim, a poor friar who was on a pilgrimage stopped in the village of Almeirim and knocked on the door of a house. He was too proud to beg for a bite to eat, so instead, he requested a large pot in which he could make “a delicious and filling.......stone soup”. With arched eyebrows and curious glances, the family invited him into their home and set up a large pot over flickering flames and filled with water. Slowly walking up to the iron clad cauldron, the friar reached into his deep pocket to produce a smooth and well-cleaned stone that he promptly dropped into the boiling water. A little while later he tasted the soup and said that it needed a touch of seasoning.

So, the wife brought him some salt to add, to which he suggested that maybe a little bit of chouriço (sausage), or pork belly, would be better. Graciously, she obliged and dropped several thick slices into the pot. Then, the friar asked if she might not have a little something to enrich the soup, such as potatoes or beans from a previous meal. With a broad smile, she agreed, and added a healthy portion into the bubbling water. This banter continued back and forth between the family and the friar before he finally announced that he had indeed made a very delicious and filling soup. When the soup was done, the friar fished the stone out of the pot, washed and dried it off, and plopped it back in his pocket for the next time.

Nowadays Almeirim is a gastronomical destination for Portuguese people, as well as for foreign people, willing to taste this soup.

== Notable citizens ==
- Ferdinand, Duke of Viseu (1433–1470) third son of Edward, King of Portugal
- Gonçalo da Silveira (1526–1561) a Portuguese Jesuit missionary in southern Africa.
- Duarte, Duke of Guimarães (1541–1576) a prince, son of Duarte of Portugal, 4th Duke of Guimarães
- Cristina Branco (born 1972) a musician and fadista.

== See also ==
- Almeirim IPR
