= Beau-Séjour Palace =

Palace of Beau-Séjour
- Palácio do Beau-Séjour
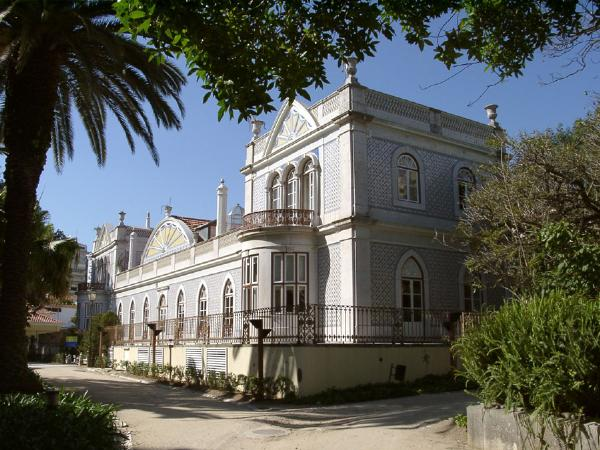

- Location of the palace/residence within the municipality of Lisbon

General information
- Type: Palace
- Architectural style: Art Nouveau
- Location: Santo António, Portugal
- Coordinates: 38°44′48.04″N 9°10′58.01″W
- Opened: 1849
- Owner: Portuguese Republic

Technical details
- Material: Mixed masonry

The Palace of Beau-Séjour (Portuguese: Palácio do Beau-Séjour) is a 19th-century Portuguese manor house situated in the civil parish of São Domingos de Benfica, municipality of Lisbon.
