= Benfica do Ribatejo =

- Civil parish
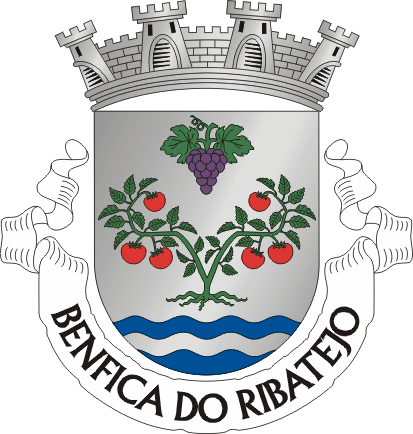
- Coat of arms

- Location in Portugal
- Coordinates: 39.14°N 8.68°W
- Country: Portugal
- Region: Oeste e Vale do Tejo
- Intermunic. comm.: Lezíria do Tejo
- District: Santarém
- Municipality: Almeirim

Area
  - Total: 29.27 km^{2} (11.30 sq mi)

Population (2011)
  - Total: 3,067
  - Density: 100/km^{2} (270/sq mi)
- Time zone: UTC+00:00 (WET)
  - Summer (DST): UTC+01:00 (WEST)

Benfica do Ribatejo (European Portuguese: [bɐ̃jˈfikɐ ðu ʁiβɐˈtɛʒu]) is a town and a civil parish in the municipality of Almeirim, Portugal. The population in 2011 was 3,067, in an area of 29.27 km².
