= S.L. Benfica (table tennis) =

Benfica
- Full name: Sport Lisboa e Benfica
- Founded: 1935
- Ground: Estádio da Luz
- Coach: Gonçalo Castanheira
- League: First Division of Men's League; Second Division of Women's League
- 2013–14: 7th (men); 4th (women)
- Website: http://www.slbenfica.pt/pt-pt/mais/tenisdemesa.aspx

Sport Lisboa e Benfica (Portuguese pronunciation: [sɨˈpɔɾ liʒˈβoɐ i βɐ̃jˈfikɐ]), commonly known as Benfica, is a semi-professional table tennis team based in Lisbon, Portugal. Founded in 1935, Benfica play in both the men's and women's national leagues.

It play homes games at the Estádio da Luz in a 190 m² room.

== Men's honours ==
=== Domestic competitions ===
- Portuguese Men's Table Tennis League

Winners (24): 1945, 1948, 1949, 1950, 1951, 1953, 1954, 1958, 1959, 1960, 1962, 1963, 1964, 1965, 1968, 1969, 1971, 1972, 1973, 1974, 1975, 1982, 1983, 1984

- Portuguese Men's Table Tennis Cup

Winners (16): 1951, 1953, 1954, 1955, 1959, 1961, 1962, 1963, 1964, 1965, 1970, 1971, 1972, 1973, 1974, 1983

== Women's honours ==
=== Domestic competitions ===
- Portuguese Women's Table Tennis League

Winners (11): 1951, 1952, 1953, 1954, 1956, 1961, 1962, 1964, 1965, 1966, 1974

- Portuguese Women's Table Tennis Cup

Winners (2): 1970, 1973

== Technical staff and management ==
Name	Nat.	Job
Paulo Marques	(Portugal)	Section manager
José Carlos Alfredo	(Portugal)	Assistant section manager
Gonçalo Castaneira	(Portugal)	Main coach
Virgílio Nascimento	(Portugal)	Youth main coach
Lúcia Manuela, António Neves e Romeu Cruz	(Portugal)	Assistant coaches

== Current roster ==
Table tennis table

Name	Nat.	Age
Dinis Cunha	(Portugal)	45
José Monteiro	(Portugal)	36
João Gouveia	(Portugal)	40
Pedro Silva	(Portugal)	31
Gonçalo Castanheira	(Portugal)	33
Tomas Law	(Portugal)	30

== Notable international athletes ==
- Oliveira Ramos (1935–61)
- Francisco Campas (1936–1960)
- Júlio Costa (1941–1970)
- Carlos Galiano (1945–1971)
- Manuela Jesus (1950–1955)
- José Louro (1951–1981)
- Manuel Carvalho (1951–1969)
- Ana Maria Batista (1951–1965)
- Teresa Montoya (1953–1962)
- Alberto Ló (1958–1963)
- Delfim Soares (1959–1966)
- João Rui (1961–1981)
- José Kong (1963–1966)
- José Alvoeiro (1965–2004)
- Óscar Lameira (1966–1969)
- Ana Maria Cruz (1970–1971)
- José Janeiro (1974–1982)
- José Rocha (1974–1978)
- Rogério Alfar (1987–1992)
