= Benfica, Lisbon =

Benfica
- Civil parish
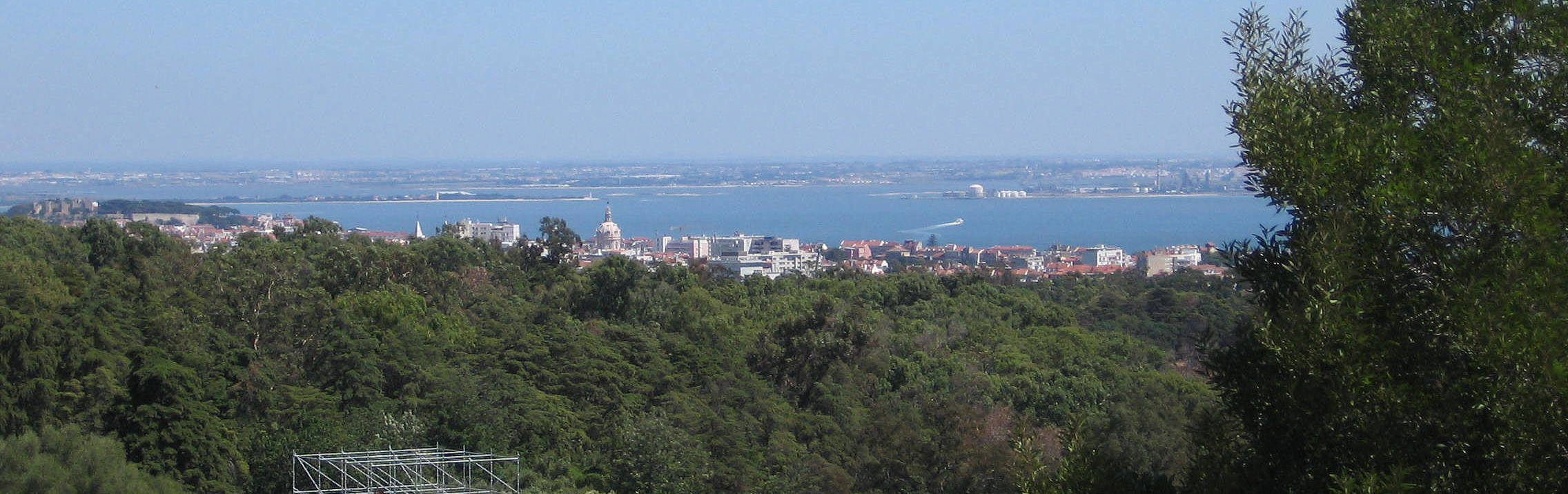
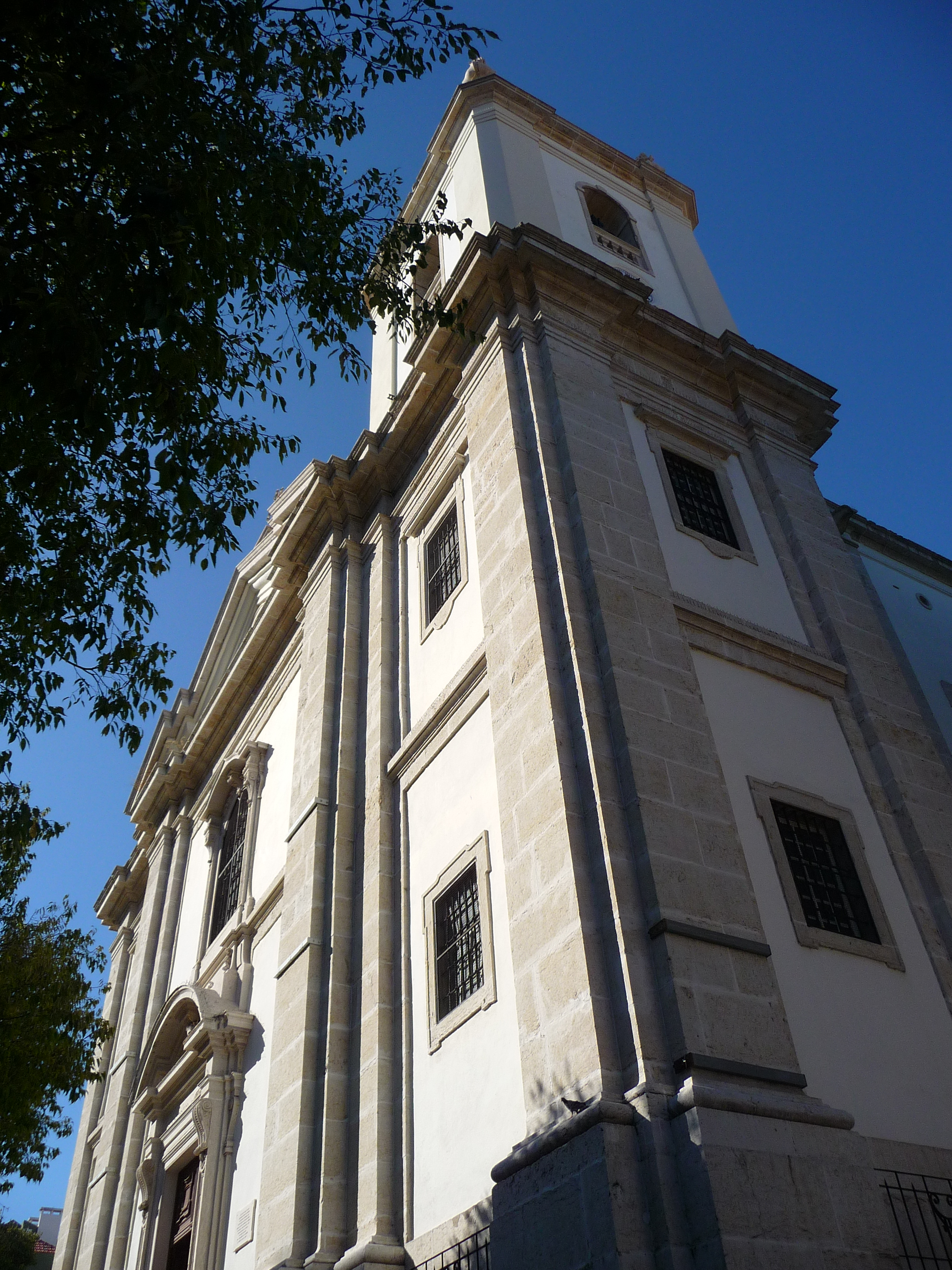
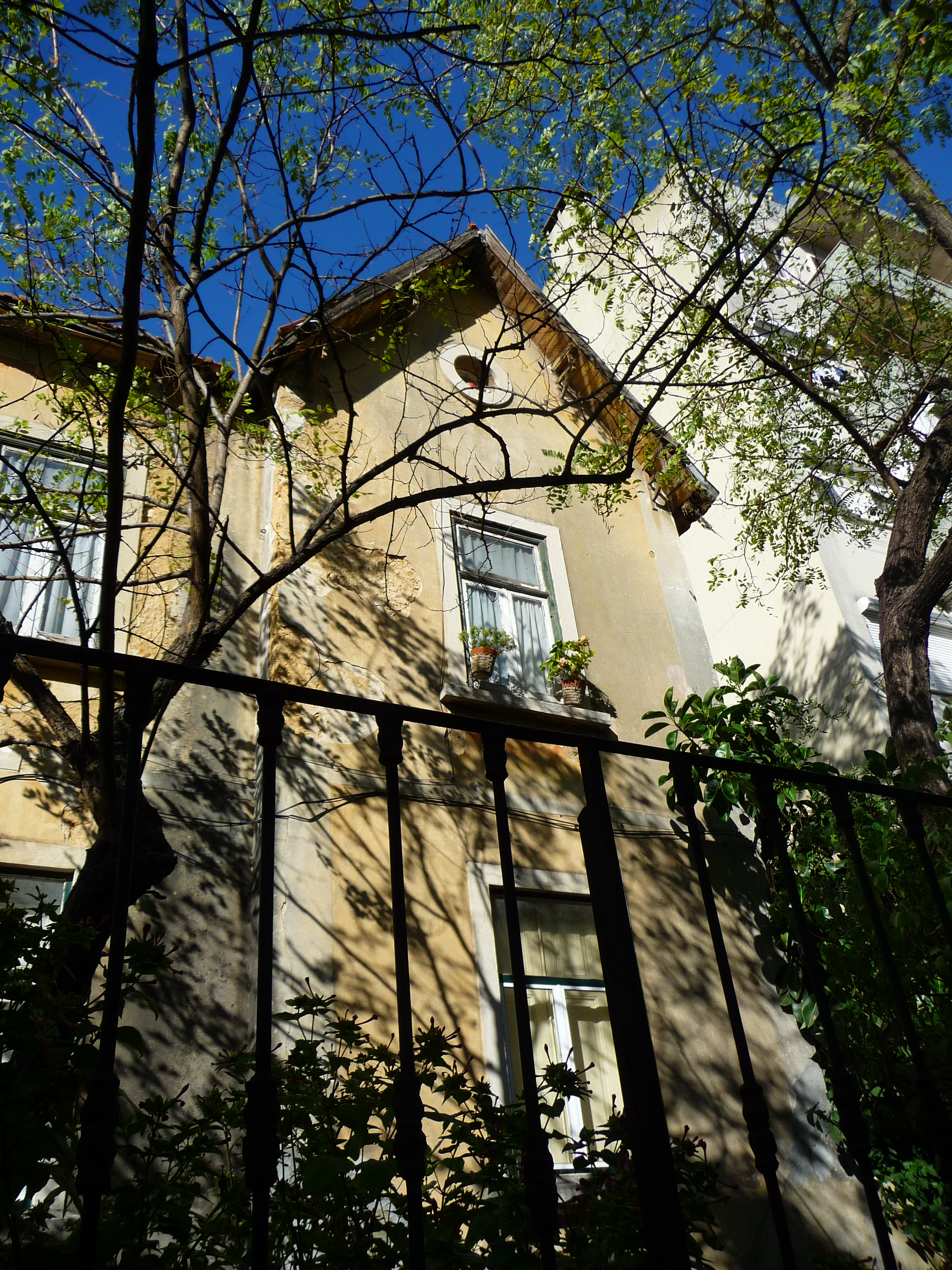
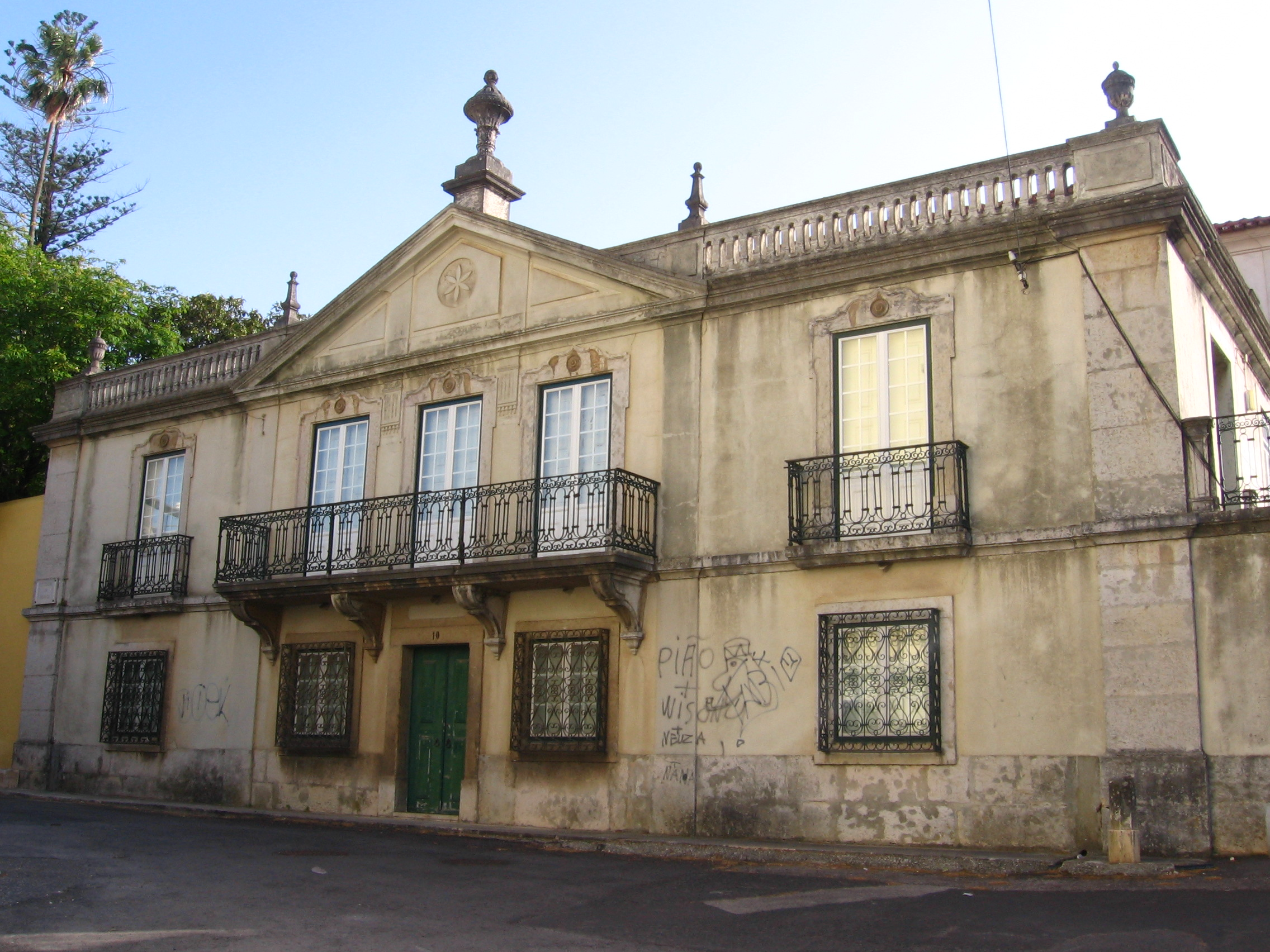
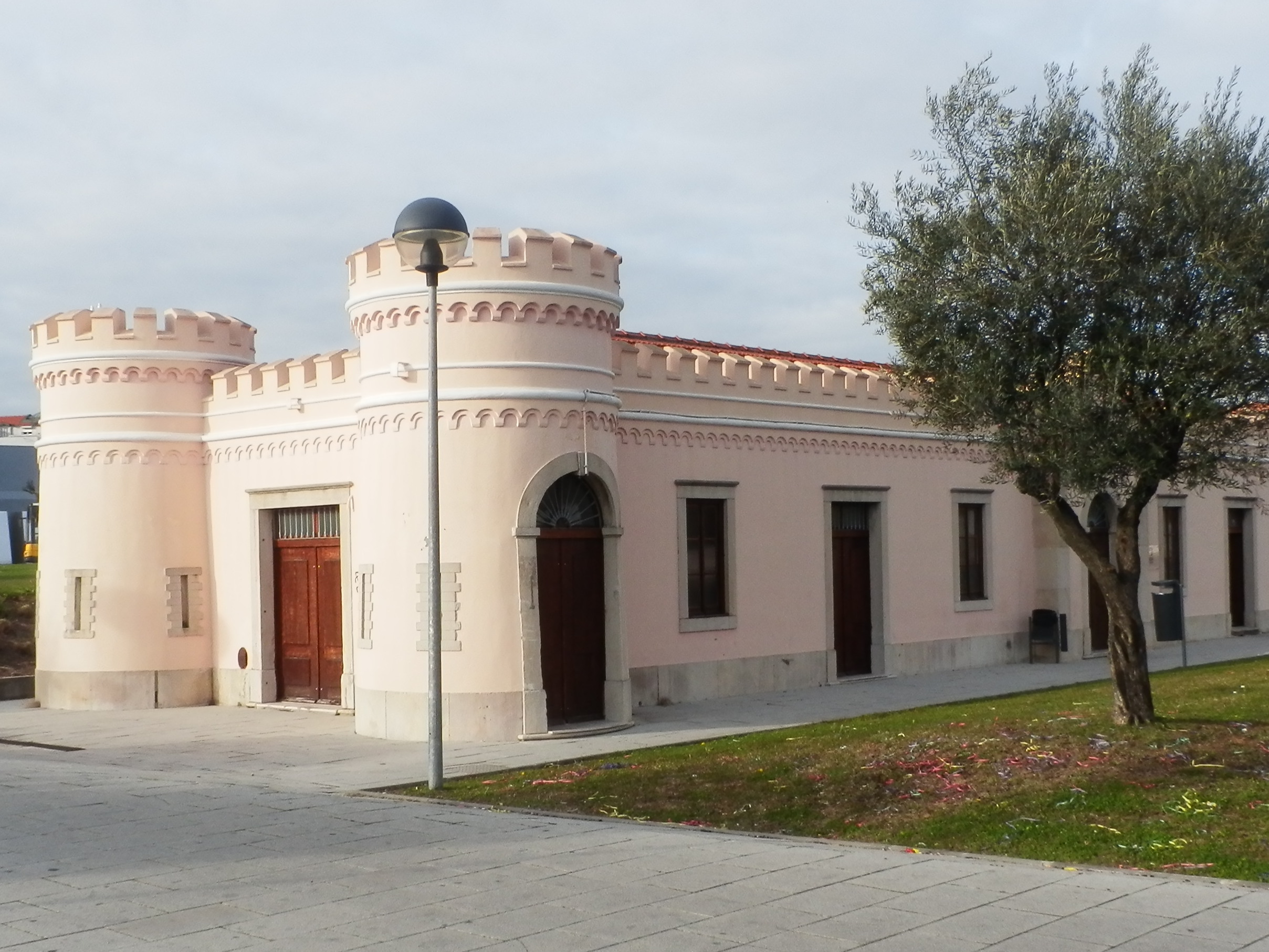
- Clockwise: View from Monsanto Forest Park; Villa Ventura; Portas de Benfica; Retiro do Bom Pastor; Nossa Senhora do Amparo Church.

- Coordinates: 38.751°N 9.202°W
- Country: Portugal
- Region: Lisbon
- Metropolitan area: Lisbon
- District: Lisbon
- Municipality: Lisbon

Area
  - Total: 8.03 km^{2} (3.10 sq mi)

Population (2011)
  - Total: 36,985
  - Density: 4,610/km^{2} (11,900/sq mi)
- Time zone: UTC+00:00 (WET)
  - Summer (DST): UTC+01:00 (WEST)

Benfica (locally [bɐ̃jˈfikɐ]) is a freguesia (civil parish) and district of Lisbon, the capital of Portugal. Located in northern Lisbon, Benfica is west of São Domingos de Benfica, Carnide, and Campolide, north of Belém, Ajuda, and Alcântara, and directly east of Lisbon's border with Amadora. The population in 2011 was 36,985,

== History ==
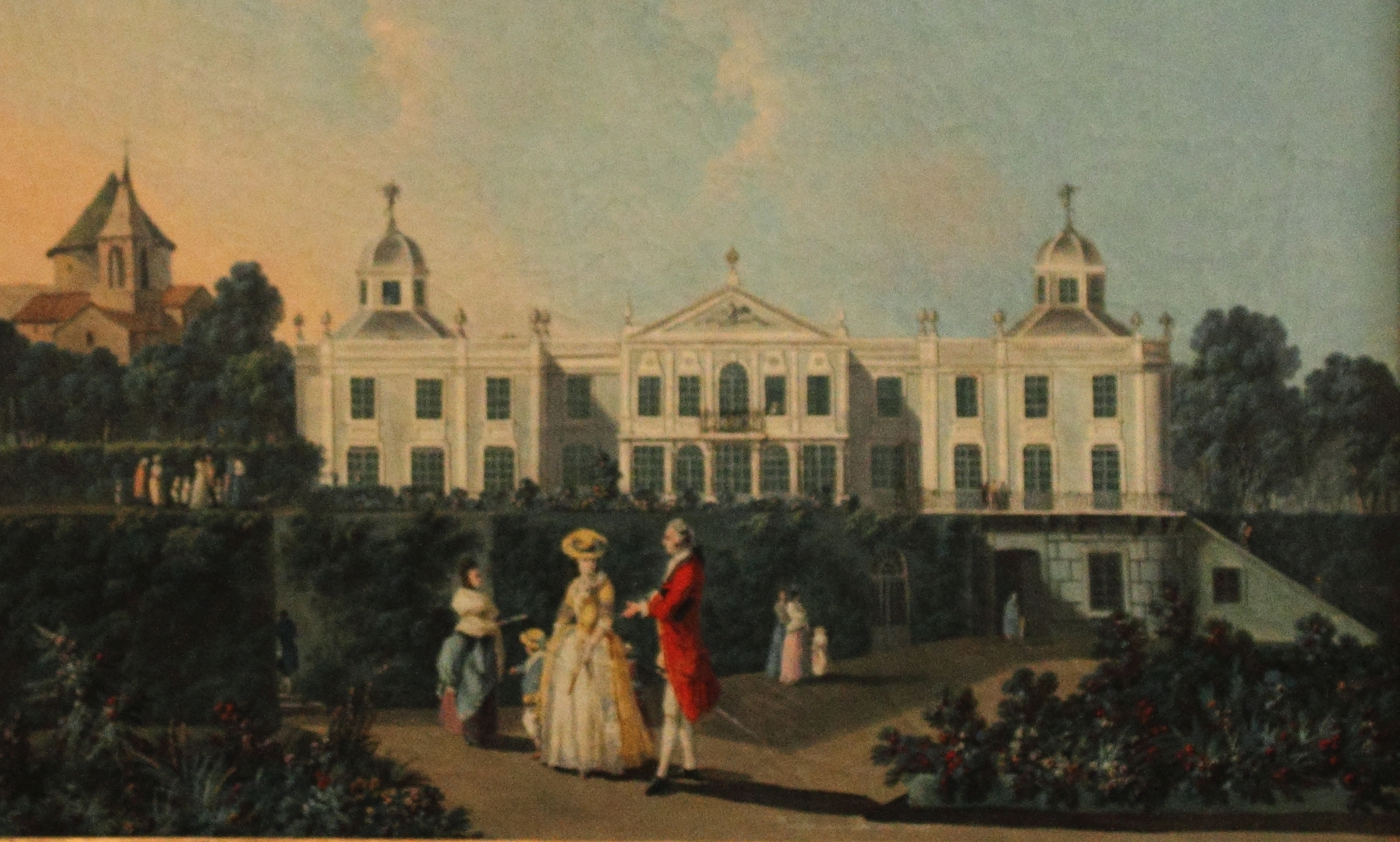
View of Benfica in 1785.

In 1959, the parish was split and gave origin to the parish of São Domingos de Benfica.

In this period, Lisbon was experiencing a fast growth; in the 1950s the population of the parish was 17,843 inhabitants, forty years later it exceeded 50,000.

However, in the 1990s, the population of Lisbon started to decline. With thousands of people leaving to the suburbs, the parish population declined to the present 38,500 inhabitants.

== Landmarks ==
The biggest park of Lisbon, the Monsanto Forest Park, is mostly (until the A5 that serves as a geographic limit with other parishes of Lisbon) located in Benfica.

- Colombo Centre
- Monsanto Forest Park
