= Juventus Manica =

- Full name: Juventus Manica
- Ground: Gaparinu des Manica; Manico, Mozambique
- Capacity: 10.000
- League: Mocambola3
- 2006: 9

Juventus Manica, usually known simply as Juventus Manica, is a traditional football (soccer) club based in Manico, Mozambique.

== Stadium ==
The club plays their home matches at Gaparinu des Manica, which has a maximum capacity of 10,000 people.
