= Silmo Mocuba =

Football club in Mozambique

- Full name: Silmo Mocuba
- Ground: Pillip miibre stadium Mocuba, Mozambique
- Capacity: 5.000
- League: Mocambola3
- 2006: 14

Silmo Mocuba, usually known simply as Silmo Mocuba, is a traditional football (soccer) club based in Mocuba, Mozambique.

== Stadium ==
The club plays their home matches at Silmo Mocuba Stadium, which has a maximum capacity of 5,000 people.
