= Desportivo Chimoio =

- Full name: Desportivo Chimoio
- Ground: Katdarra; Chimoioa, Mozambique
- Capacity: 10.000
- League: Mocambola3
- 2006: 15

Desportivo Chimoio, usually known simply as Desportivo Chimoio, is a traditional football (soccer) club based in Chimoio, West Mozambique.

== Stadium ==
The club plays their home matches at Katdarra, which has a maximum capacity of 10,000 people.
