= Palmeiras River =

There are several rivers named Palmeiras River in Brazil:

- Palmeiras River (Goiás), river in Goiás state in central Brazil
- Palmeiras River (Tocantins), river in Tocantins state in central Brazil
