= S.L. Benfica (beach soccer) =

Benfica
- Full name: Sport Lisboa e Benfica
- League: CNFP
- 2010: 2nd

Sport Lisboa e Benfica (Portuguese pronunciation: [sɨˈpɔɾ liʒˈβoɐ i βɐ̃jˈfikɐ]), commonly known as Benfica, was a professional beach soccer team. Benfica played in the National Beach Soccer Circuit and Portuguese Beach Soccer League.

== Honours ==
=== Domestic competitions ===
- Circuito Nacional de Futebol de Praia
  - Runners-up (1): 2010
- Portuguese Beach Soccer League
  - Winners (2): 2006, 2007
- Taça Nacional (2):
- Torneio FPF (1): 2009
- Torneio Masters (1):
- Troféu Tejo (1):

=== European competitions ===
- Troféu Ibérico (1): 2003

=== Worldwide competitions ===
- Cofidis Beach Soccer Clubs Cup (Campeonato Mundial de clubes/Liga Mundial/Liga de clubes)
  - Winners (1): 2007
