= Alyans =

Alyans may refer to:

- Alyans (band), a Russian/Soviet rock band
- Democratic Alliance (Haiti), a Haitian electoral alliance commonly known by its Haitian Creole name Alyans
