= São Domingos de Benfica =

- Civil parish
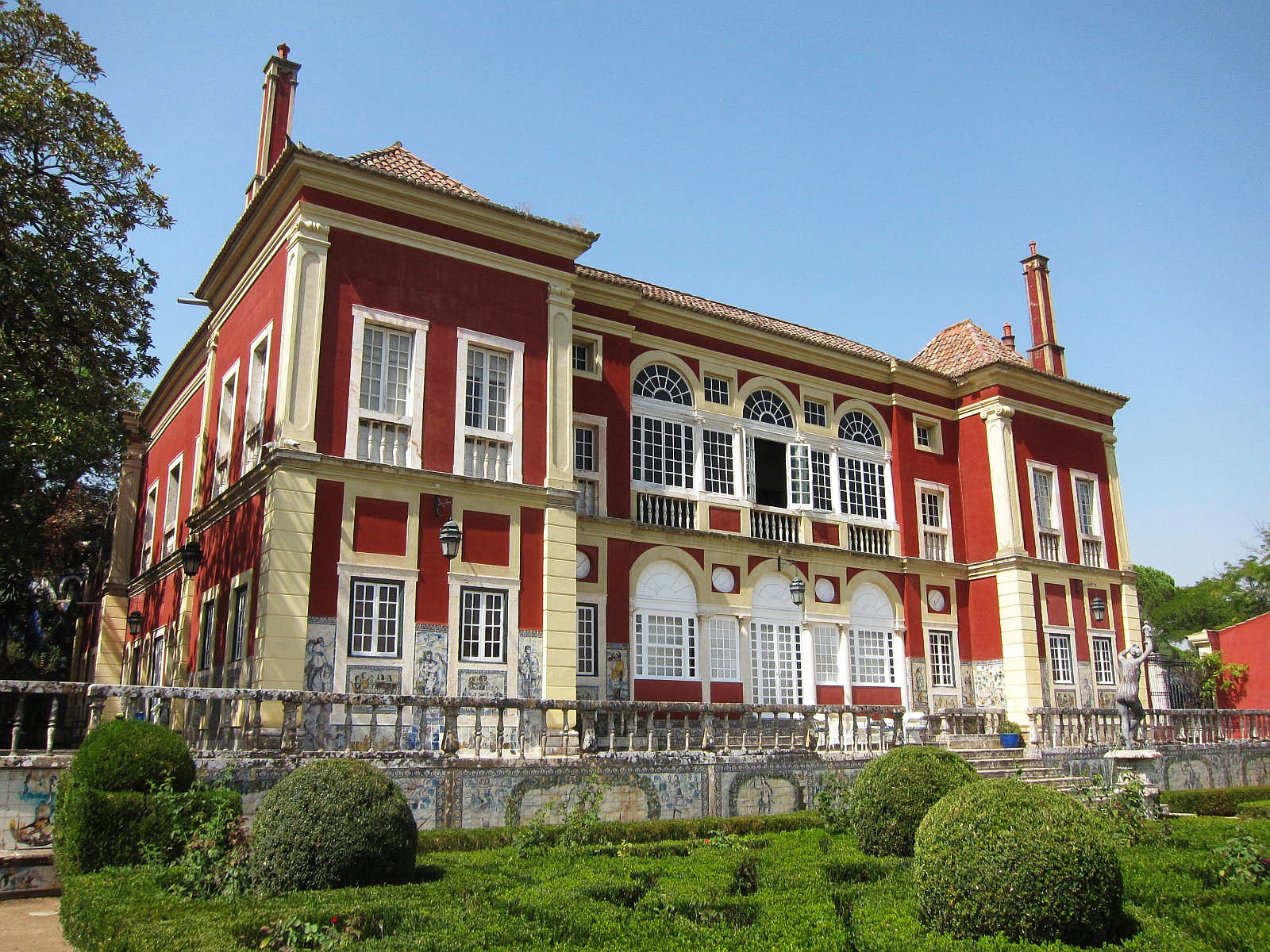
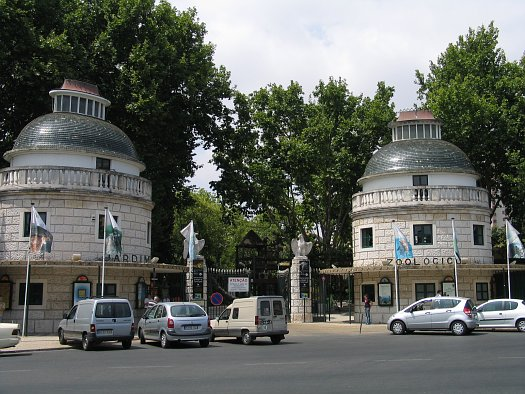
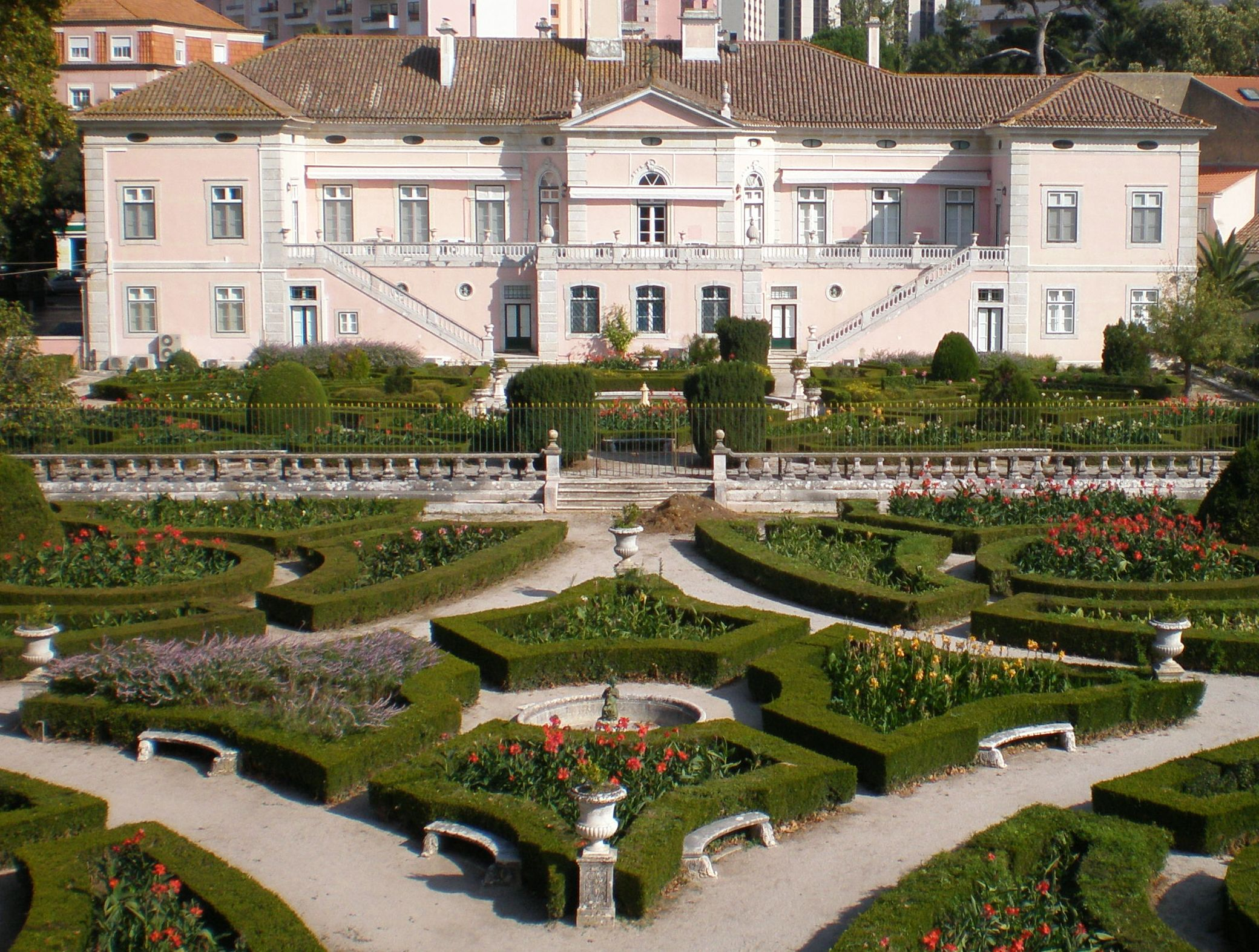
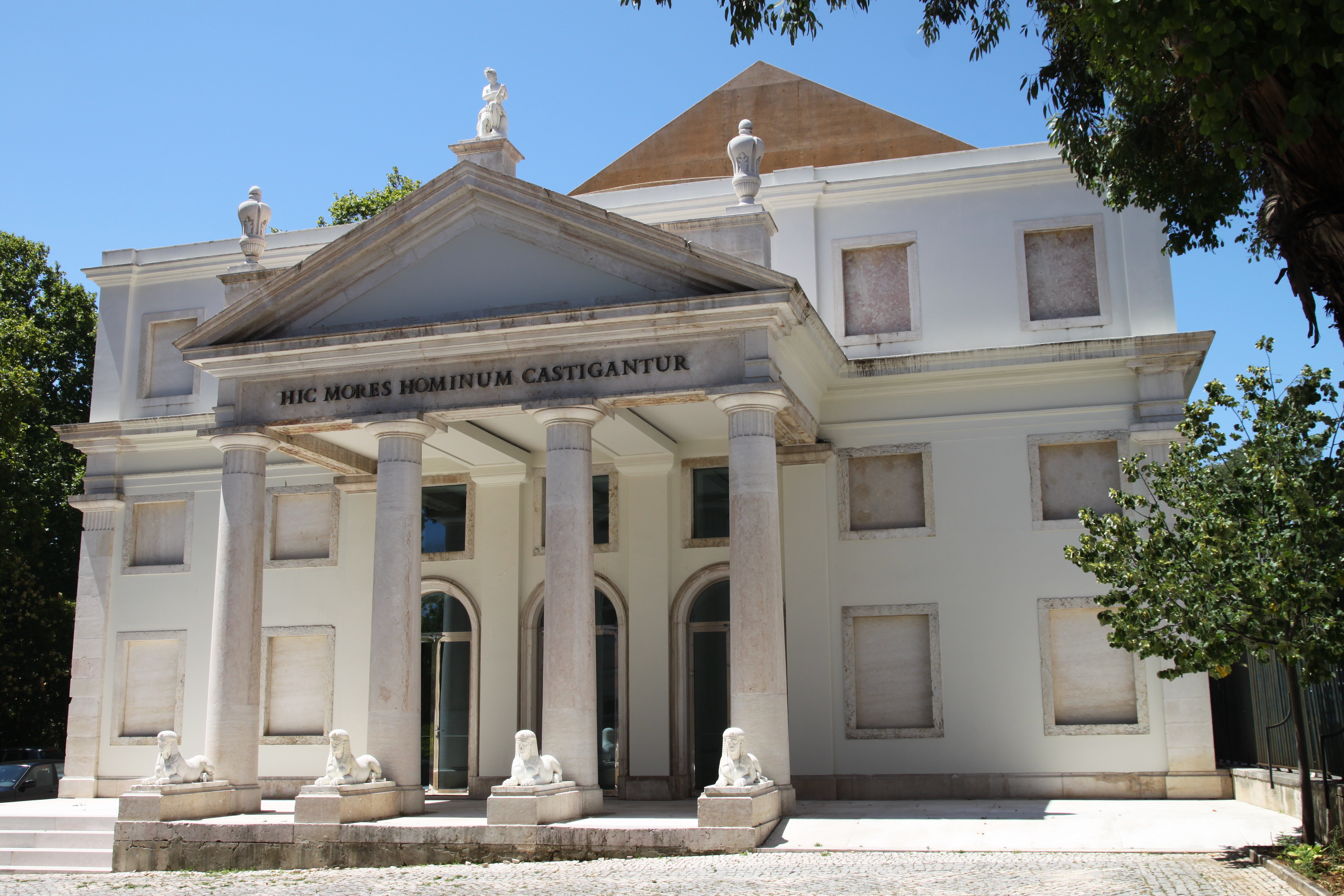
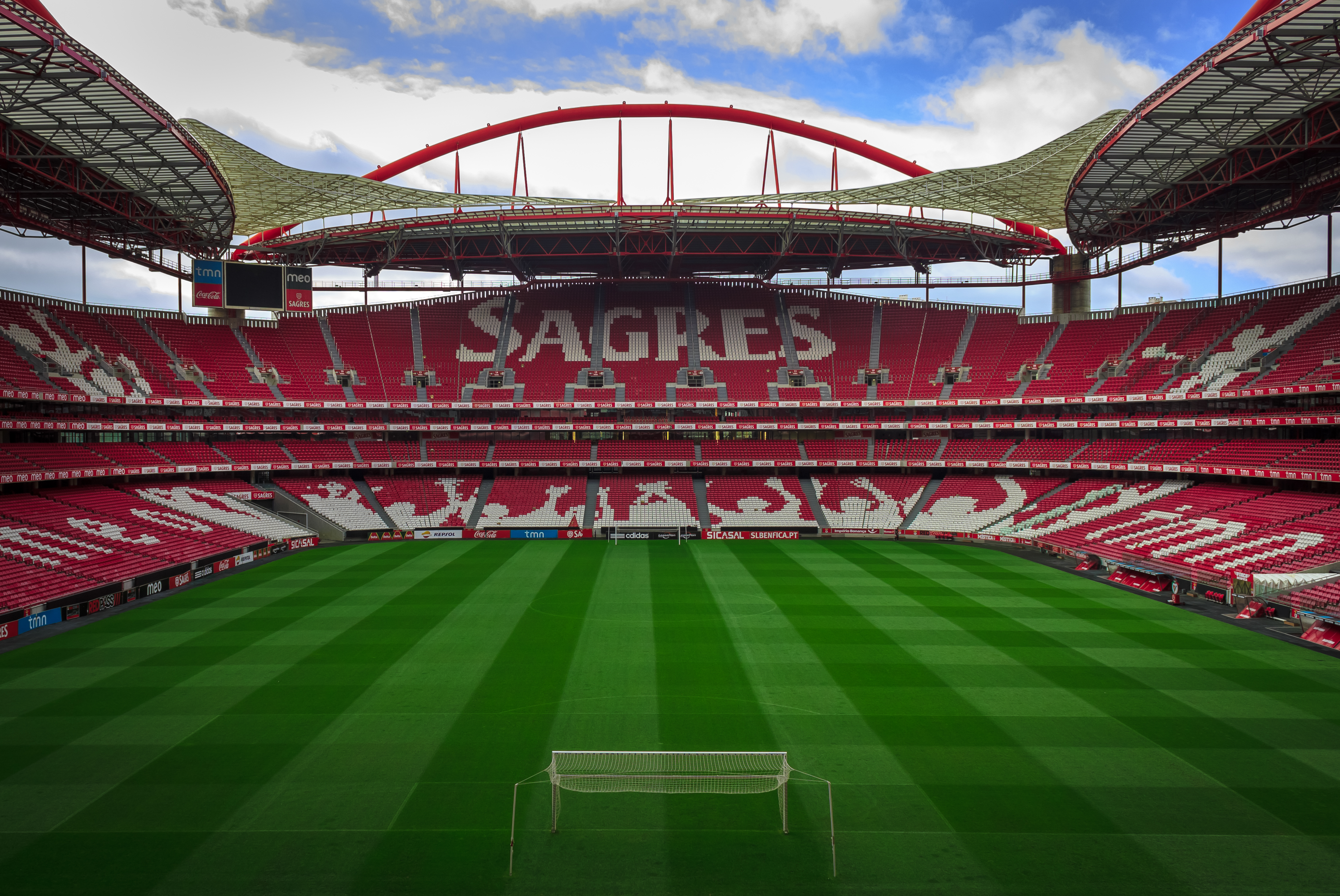
- Top: Fronteira Palace; Lisbon Zoo; Middle: Laranjeiras Palace; Bottom: Teatro Tália; Estádio da Luz.

- Coordinates: 38.743°N 9.174°W
- Country: Portugal
- Region: Lisbon
- Metropolitan area: Lisbon
- District: Lisbon
- Municipality: Lisbon

Area
  - Total: 4.29 km^{2} (1.66 sq mi)

Population (2011)
  - Total: 33,043
  - Density: 7,700/km^{2} (19,900/sq mi)
- Time zone: UTC+00:00 (WET)
  - Summer (DST): UTC+01:00 (WEST)
- Postal code: 1500
- Area code: 217
- Patron: São Domingos
- Website: jf-sdomingosbenfica.pt

São Domingos de Benfica (Portuguese pronunciation: [sɐ̃w duˈmĩɡuʒ ðɨ βɐ̃jˈfikɐ]) is a freguesia (civil parish) and district of Lisbon, the capital of Portugal. Located in northern Lisbon, São Domingos de Benfica is east of Benfica, south of Carnide, west of Alvalade, and north of Campolide. The population in 2011 was 33,043,

== History ==
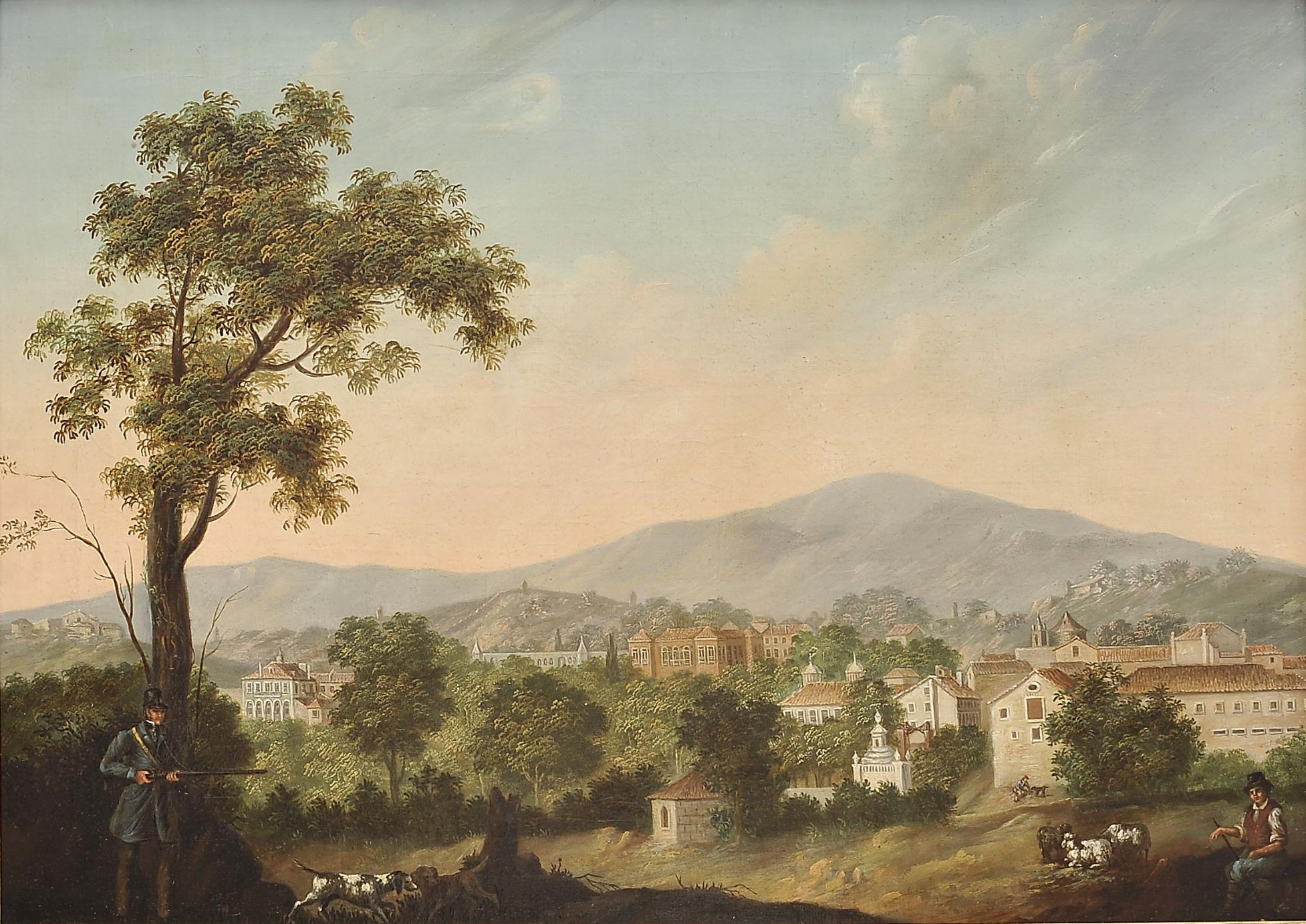
View of a pastoral São Domingos de Benfica, 19th century.

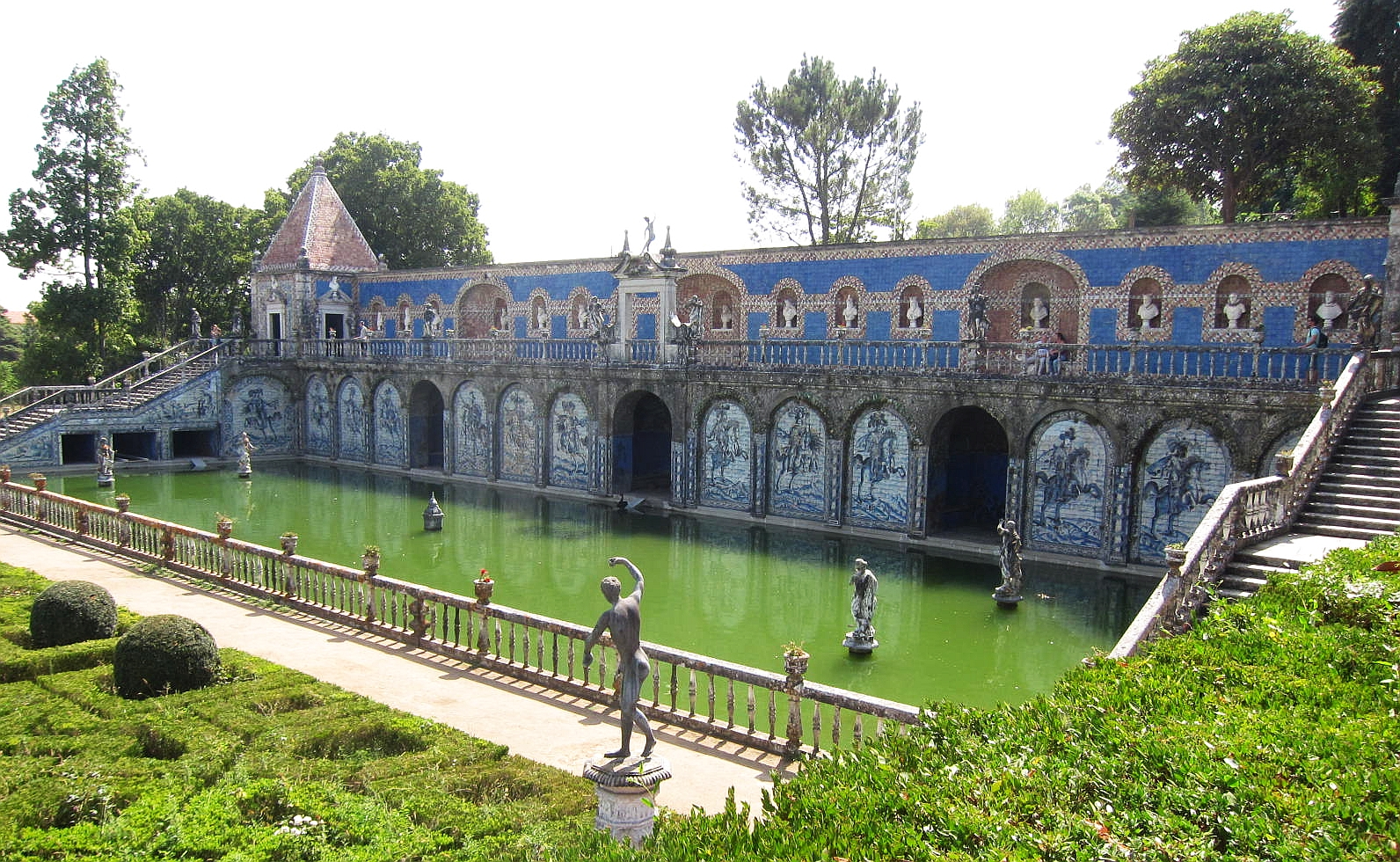
Gardens of the Palace of the Marquises of Fronteira.

It is unclear when people began to settle in the region that would become São Domingos, but may have its basis in the 13th century. A rural subregion, it was less important social-economic centre of Lisbon.

São Domingos de Benfica had its origins in a legend. It was King John I of Portugal who donated it to the Dominican religious order, under the request of João das Regras. Over time, it was in this land that a palace was erected, later known as the Palace of Benfica (Paço de Benfica), a summer residence of many of the sovereigns since Denis of Portugal. Owing to the legend, King John visited the area, and underscored its natural beauty, affirming: aqui bem-fica o convento (here [is well situated] the convent). The settlement of Benfica was a privileged location with access to water and situated in a forested cover, that highlighted the natural characteristics of Lisbon.

The administrative borders of the parish of São Domingos de Benfica, were delimited by decree law 42/142 on 7 February 1959.

During the 17th century, the territory of São Domingos de Benfica was sought after by aristocratic families to construct palaces and estates, that included orchards, vegetable and flower gardens.

A new period of evolution occurred in the 18th century, when wetlands were converted into arable land, and these lands were apportioned for agriculture. Following the 1755 earthquake many of these estates were permanently occupied by property-owners escaping from the desolation in Lisbon. As a result, many of summer/recreational residences were converted to residences.

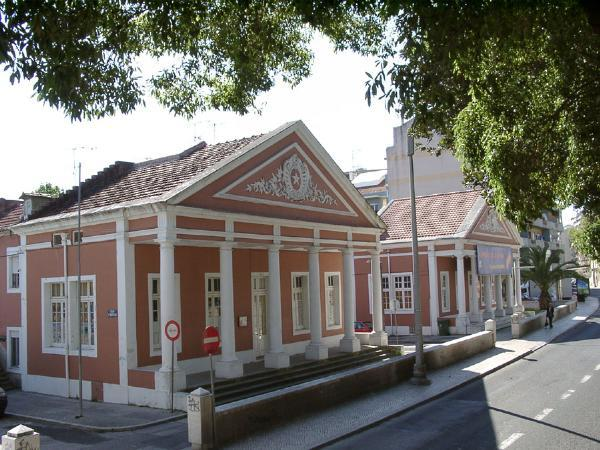
Bairro Grandella.

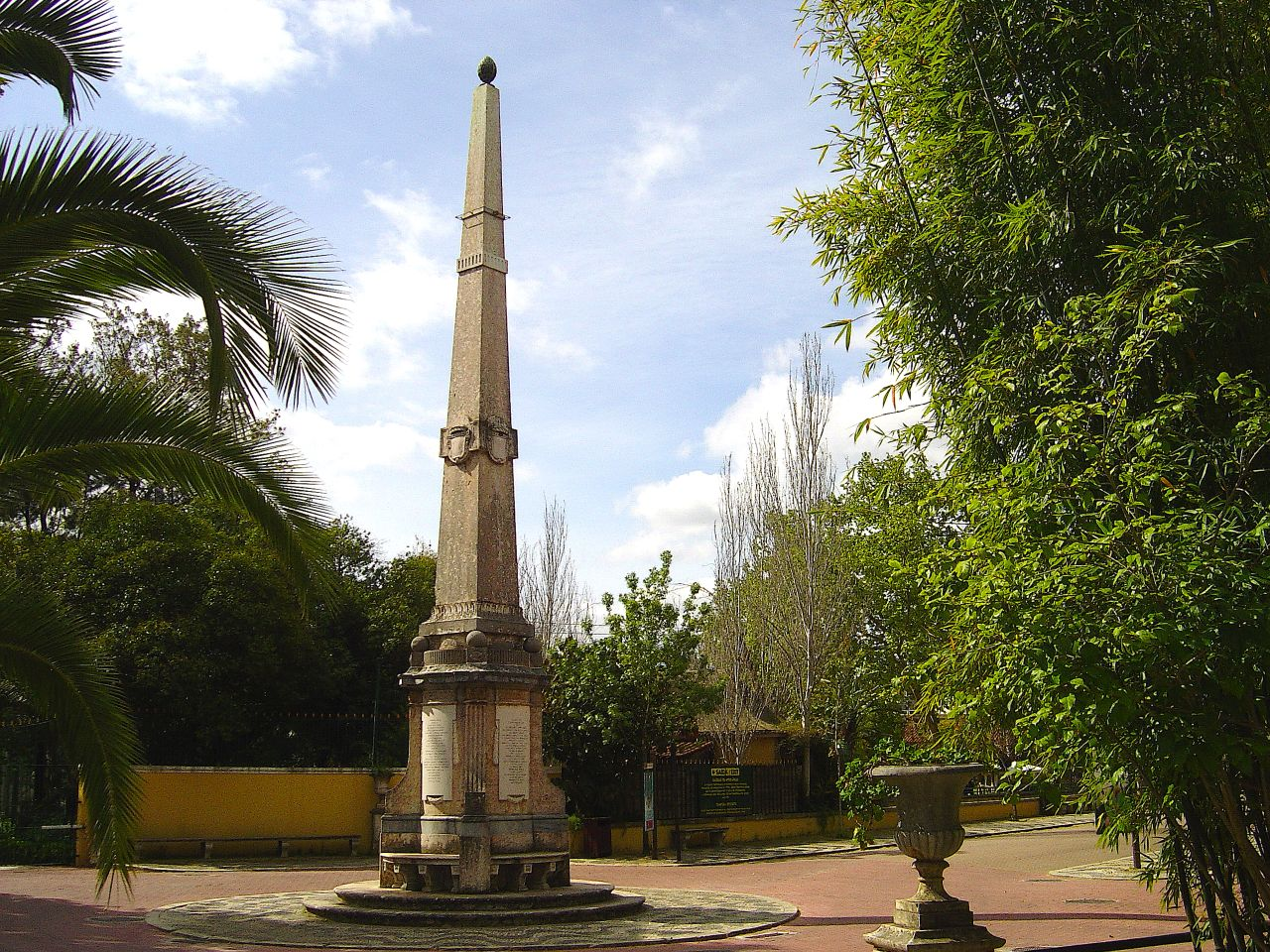
Gardens of Lisbon Zoo.

With the growth in demography, the area of Benfica by the 19th century began to be served by public transport: the creation of the Estrada da Circunvalação in 1852, allowed the establishment of new city limits. Consequently, the territory of the new parish of São Domingos de Benfica became integrated into the municipality of Belém, and until this municipality was extinguished in 1885. The creation of the military road and Lisbon-Sintra railway line in 1885; the opening of the electric trams, in 1929, then bus lines in 1985, allowed the expansion of the metropolitan region until Sete Rios, and made the parish one of the more popular settlements.

== Geography ==
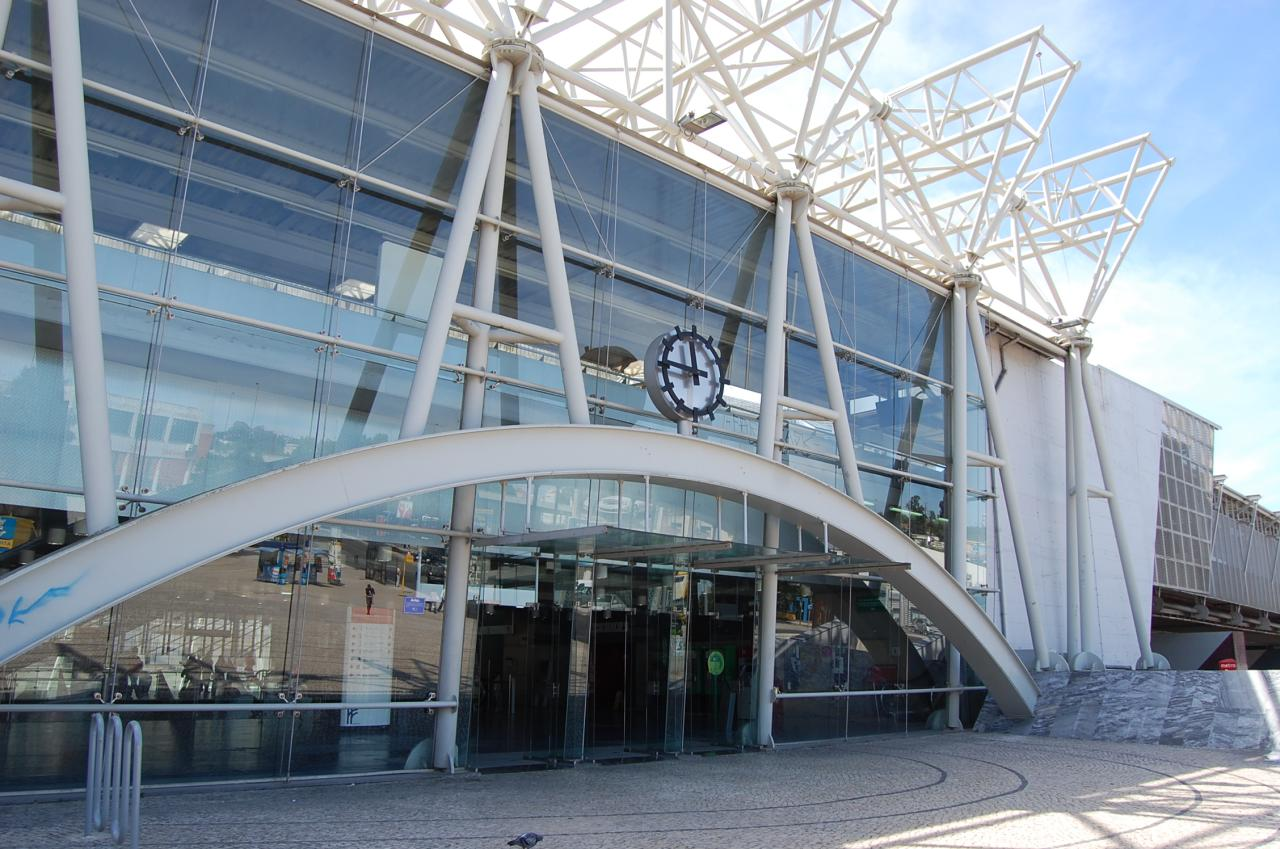
Sete Rios Station.

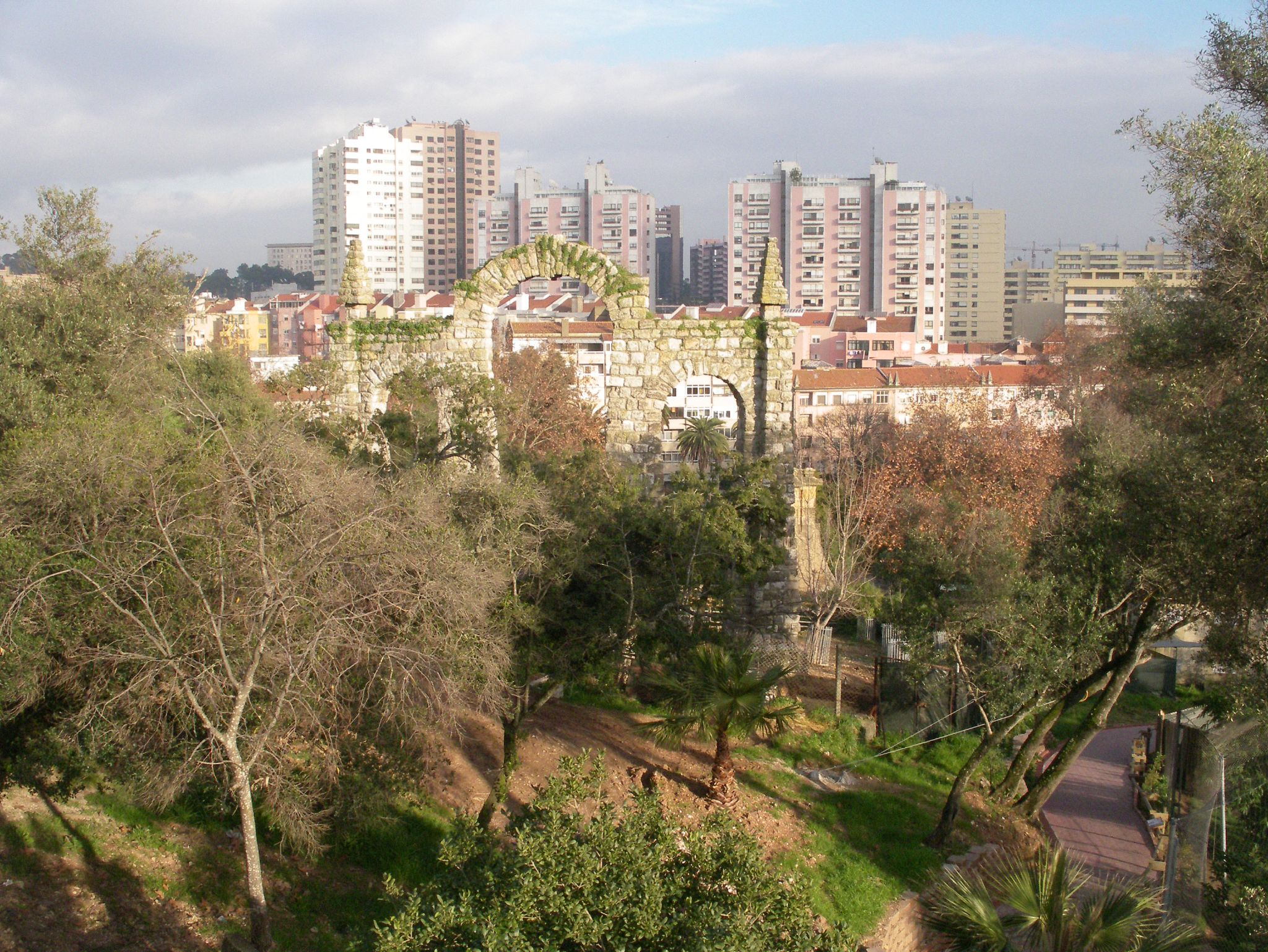
Sete Rios neighborhood.

São Domingos de Benfica is a large urban area and settlement that extends from Sete Rios in the direction of Benfica and to the western edge of the Monsanto Park, along the road from Luz and Laranjeiras. The parish is delimited by other six civil parishes of Lisbon: Benfica, Carnide, Lumiar, Alvalade, Avenidas Novas and Campolide.

== Economy ==
Tourism constitutes the primary industry, with a significant importance in the economic activity of the parish's society. São Domingos de Benfica is one of the more cosmopolitan and most populous parishes of Lisbon, constituting a vital touristic polo that differentiates it from other parishes.

== Architecture ==
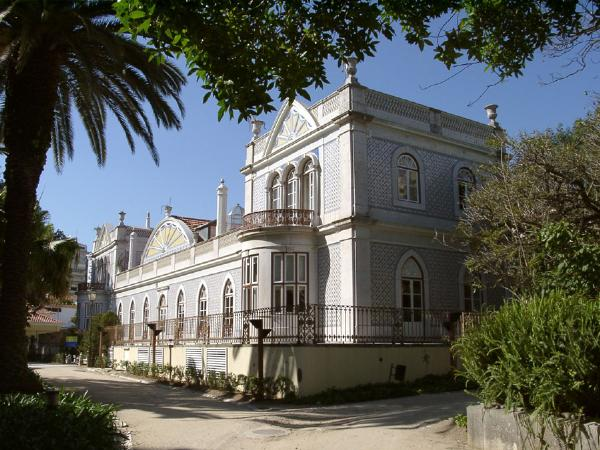
Beau-Séjour Palace.

São Domingos, owing to its settled age, is characterized by a propensity of historic properties, that have been responsible for attracting tourism to the center of Lisbon.

=== Civic ===
- Estádio da Luz, home of S.L. Benfica
- Estate of Alfarrobeira (Quinta da Alfarrobeira)
- Estate of the Counts of Bonfim (Quinta Nova da Conceição/Quinta dos Condes de Bonfim/Quinta do Ottolini)
- Estate of Devisme (Quinta Devisme/Quinta da Infanta/Reformatório Feminino de Lisboa/Instituto de São Domingos de Benfica)
- Estate of Lameiro (Quinta do Lameiro)
- Fountain of São Domingos (Chafariz de São Domingos/Chafariz Devisme), integrated into a long wall, and aligned with pilasters, terminated in cornices, the main panel crowned by crowned with backrest and obelisk with two spouts in the shape of dolphins, topped by niche and rectangular cartouche;
- Fountain of Laranjeiras (Chafariz das Laranjeiras), located on the posterior of a building in front of the palace, it was built as part of the Águas Livres water supply project for Lisbon, and consists of rectangular facade, flanked by vertical square pillars, decorated with cornices and friezes.
- Navarro de Paiva Institute/Education Centre (Instituto Navarro de Paiva/Centro Educativo Navarro de Paiva)
- Palace of Bensaude (Palácio Bensaúde)
- Palace of Beau-Séjour (Quinta das Campainhas/Quinta do Beau-Séjour/Palácio do Beau-Séjour/Gabinete de Estudos Olisiponenses)
- Palace of the Counts of Farrobo (Palácio dos Condes de Farrobo/Palácio das Laranjeiras e Teatro Tália)
- Palace of the Marquises of Fronteira (Palácio dos Marqueses de Fronteira)
- Portuguese Francisco Gentil Martins Institute for Oncology (Instituto Português de Oncologia Francisco Gentil Martins)

=== Religious ===
- Chapel of the Castros (Capela dos Castros), a Mannerist funeral chapel;
- Church of São Domingos de Benfica (Igreja Paroquial de São Domingos de Benfica/Igreja de São Domingos)
- Church of São Tomás de Aquino (Igreja Paroquial de Luz Sul/Igreja de São Tomás de Aquino)
- Convent of Santo António da Convalescença (Convento de Santo António da Convalescença / Universidade Internacional)
- Convent of São Domingos de Benfica (Convento de São Domingos de Benfica/Igreja de São Domingos de Benfica)

== Sport ==
The Estádio da Luz, the home stadium of S.L. Benfica, is located within São Domingos de Benfica; until São Domingos was split-off from Benfica, the club represented most of the territory, but this changed with the 1959 de-annexation and creation of São Domingos.
