= CSD Benfica =

C.S.D. Benfica
- Full name: Clube Sport Dili e Benfica
- Nickname(s): O Sol Nascente (The Raising Sun)
- Founded: 1965; 60 years ago
- Ground: Municipal Stadium, Dili
- Capacity: 5,000
- League: Super Liga
- 2005–06: no participant
| Home colours | Third colours |

C.S.D. Benfica or Clube Sport Dili e Benfica is a football club based in Dili, East Timor.
