= S.L. Benfica (archery) =

Sport Lisboa e Benfica (Portuguese pronunciation: [sɨˈpɔɾ liʒˈβoɐ i βɐ̃jˈfikɐ]), commonly known as Benfica, was one of the most important archery teams in Portugal. Benfica's archery section was opened in 1949 and won several titles at regional, national and international level. Some of the club's titles include nine Portuguese championships, one Portuguese Cup and one Tornoi Européen de Nîmes FITA.

Their last titles were won in 2010 with Nuno Pombo in men's seniors, and with Armindo Cera in veterans' class, both at recurve bow.
