= Palmeiras Quelimane =

- Full name: Palmeiras Futebol Clube de Quelimane
- 2013: Campeonato Provincial (Zambézia), 1st

Palmeiras Futebol Clube de Quelimane is a Mozambican football club based in Quelimane, Zambezia Province. In 2011, the team reached the semifinal of the Taça de Moçambique, and the following season came within one point of promotion to the Moçambola, the top division of football in Mozambique.
