= Feijó =

Feijó could refer to:

- Feijó, Acre, a city in Acre state, Brazil

- Feijó Airport, a private airport serving the city

- Feijó (Almada), a former civil parish in Almada, Portugal

- Laranjeiro e Feijó, the current parish

== See also ==
- Feijóo, a surname
- Regente Feijó, in São Paulo state, Brazil
