= Diana Prata =

Portuguese neuroscientist concerned with the biological basis of human behaviour

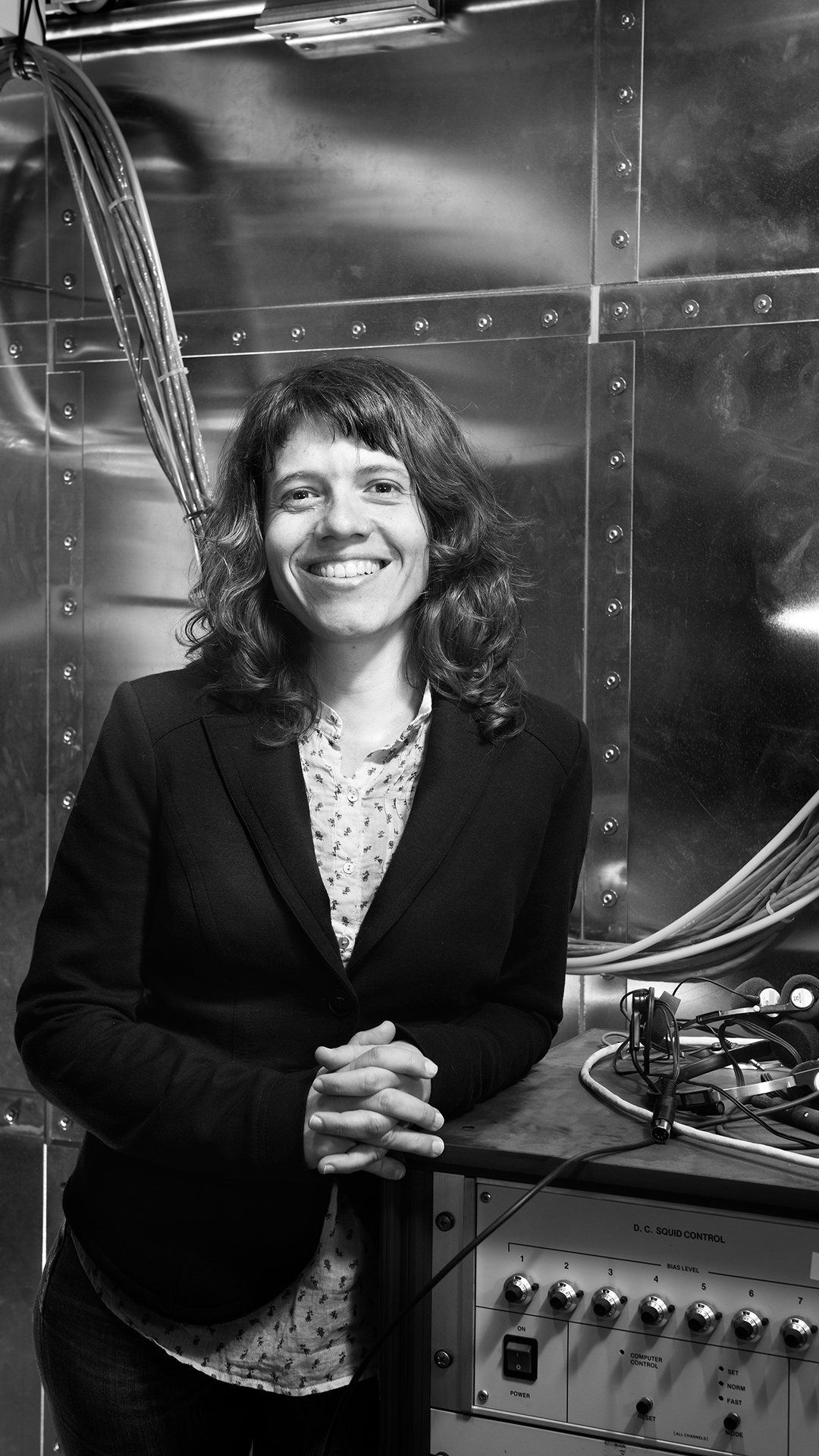
- Diana Prata in 2019
- Born: Portugal
- Occupation: Neuroscientist
- Known for: Head of Biomedical Neuroscience Lab at the University of Lisbon

Diana Prata is a Portuguese neuroscientist who concentrates on identifying the biological basis of human behaviour. She reported the first evidence that schizophrenia-risk genes can also predispose to bipolar disorder and has also investigated reasons why people respond differently to antipsychotic medications. She is head of the Biomedical Neuroscience Lab at the University of Lisbon.

== Training ==
Diana Prata studied at secondary school in Almada, Portugal on the left bank of the River Tagus, to the southwest of the Portuguese capital of Lisbon. Between 1997 and 2002, she studied for a BSc and an MSc in biology at the University of Lisbon, obtaining an Erasmus scholarship for study in Crete. With the help of a Leonardo da Vinci programme fellowship she moved to the Institute of Psychiatry, Psychology and Neuroscience at King's College London (KCL) and then obtained a grant from the Portuguese Fundação para a Ciência e Tecnologia (Science and Technology Foundation -FCT) to complete a PhD in neuroimaging genetics, which she obtained in 2008, with a thesis on the "Effect of Dopamine Regulating Genes on Regional Brain Function during Verbal Fluency in Controls and in Patients with Schizophrenia".

== Career ==
Prata was awarded a National Institute for Health Research post-doctoral fellowship in the UK to work on a multimodal biomarker of psychosis, and became a lecturer at KCL. After 12 years in the UK, she returned to Lisbon and founded her own research laboratory at the Instituto de Medicina Molecular. The laboratory is now the Biomedical Neuroscience Lab (Diana Prata) at the Institute of Biophysics and Biomedical Engineering of the University of Lisbon, where she is a Marie Curie Fellow. In addition to the Marie Curie Career Integration Grant, she has been awarded funding by the pharmaceutical company, Bial and has received several FCT research grants. She continues to be a visiting lecturer at KCL and also lectures at the ISCTE – University Institute of Lisbon.

Her research has led to the first evidence that schizophrenia-risk genes can predispose to bipolar disorder. Her PhD research identified how genetic mutations affect white matter structure and brain activation. Her post-doctoral work described how mutations can explain why people respond differently to antipsychotics. She also initiated a biomarker study to try to predict who is likely to develop schizophrenia. More recently, using a range of psychophysiological measures, she has been investigating the role of oxytoxin in the development of social skills. She is also aiming to develop biomarkers to help with clinical diagnosis and prognosis for Alzheimer's disease and Parkinson's disease.

Prata has appeared on most Portuguese television stations, as well as on the History Channel and Radio France Internationale. She is often interviewed by Portuguese newspapers as well as writing opinion pieces. She has given a TEDx talk in Portugal.

== Publications ==
Prata 's most cited peer-reviewed papers are:

- DP Prata, A Mechelli, CHY Fu, M Picchioni, T Toulopoulou, E Bramon, et al. Epistasis between the DAT 3' UTR VNTR and the COMT Val158Met SNP on cortical function in healthy subjects and patients with schizophrenia. Proceedings of the National Academy of Sciences 106 (32), 13600-13605
- DP Prata, A Mechelli, CHY Fu, M Picchioni, F Kane, S Kalidindi et al. Opposite effects of catechol-O-methyltransferase Val158Met on cortical function in healthy subjects and patients with schizophrenia. Biological psychiatry 65 (6), 473–480
- DP Prata, G Breen, S Osborne, J Munro, DS Clair, DA Collier, et al. An association study of the neuregulin 1 gene, bipolar affective disorder and psychosis. Psychiatric genetics 19 (3), 113–116
- DP Prata, A Mechelli, CHY Fu, M Picchioni, F Kane, S Kalidindi, et al. Effect of disrupted-in-schizophrenia-1 on pre-frontal cortical function. Molecular psychiatry 13 (10), 915–917
