= Laranjeiro =

- Civil parish
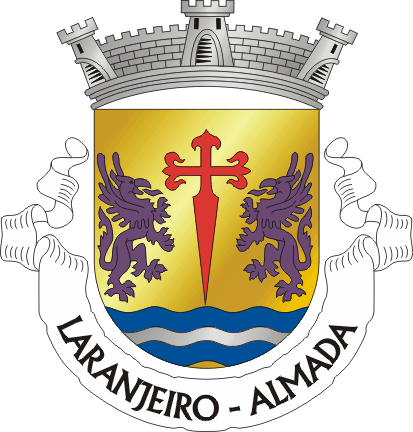
- Coat of arms

- Location in Portugal
- Coordinates: 38.657°N 9.150°W
- Country: Portugal
- Region: Lisbon
- Metropolitan area: Lisbon
- District: Setúbal
- Municipality: Almada
- Disbanded: 2013

Area
  - Total: 3.88 km^{2} (1.50 sq mi)

Population (2011)
  - Total: 20,988
  - Density: 5,410/km^{2} (14,000/sq mi)
- Time zone: UTC+00:00 (WET)
  - Summer (DST): UTC+01:00 (WEST)

Laranjeiro (Portuguese for field of orange trees) is a former civil parish in the municipality of Almada, Lisbon metropolitan area, Portugal. In 2013, the parish merged into the new parish Laranjeiro e Feijó. The population in 2011 was 20,988, in an area of 3.88 km^{2}.
