= Almada Forum =

Shopping center in Almada, Portugal

Coordinates: 38.6600°N 9.1753°W

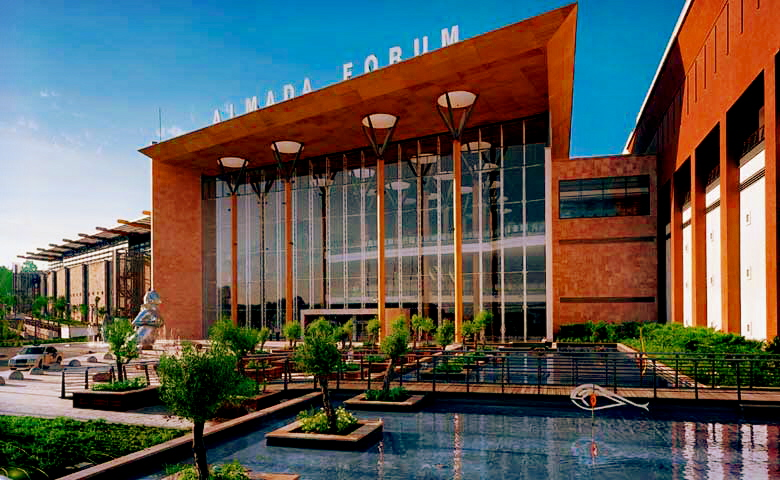
- Location: Almada, Portugal
- Opened: September 17, 2002; 24 years ago
- Developer: Multi Development Corporation; Lena Construções
- Manager: Multi Mall Management
- Owner: Multi Development Corporation; Auchan Group
- Num. of stores: 262
- Floor area: 110,000 m^{2} (1,200,000 sq ft)
- Floors: 6
- Parking: 5,325 spaces
- Website: www.almadaforum.com

Almada Forum is the third-largest shopping center in Portugal and in the Iberian Peninsula. It is situated in Vale de Mourelos, in the freguesia of Feijó and municipality of Almada. It opened in 2002 and has a total leasable space of 78,815 m^{2}.

It hosts 262 shops, including a supermarket (Auchan) and 35 restaurants. Almada Forum stretches over three floors.

In 2018, the Spanish group Merlin Properties bought Almada Forum for €406.7 million.

== Awards ==
- 2003 - Best Shopping center in Europe
- 2004 - Full Design and Development Award - Best Shopping Center of the World 2004, by ICSC - 28th edition of International Council of Shopping Centers
