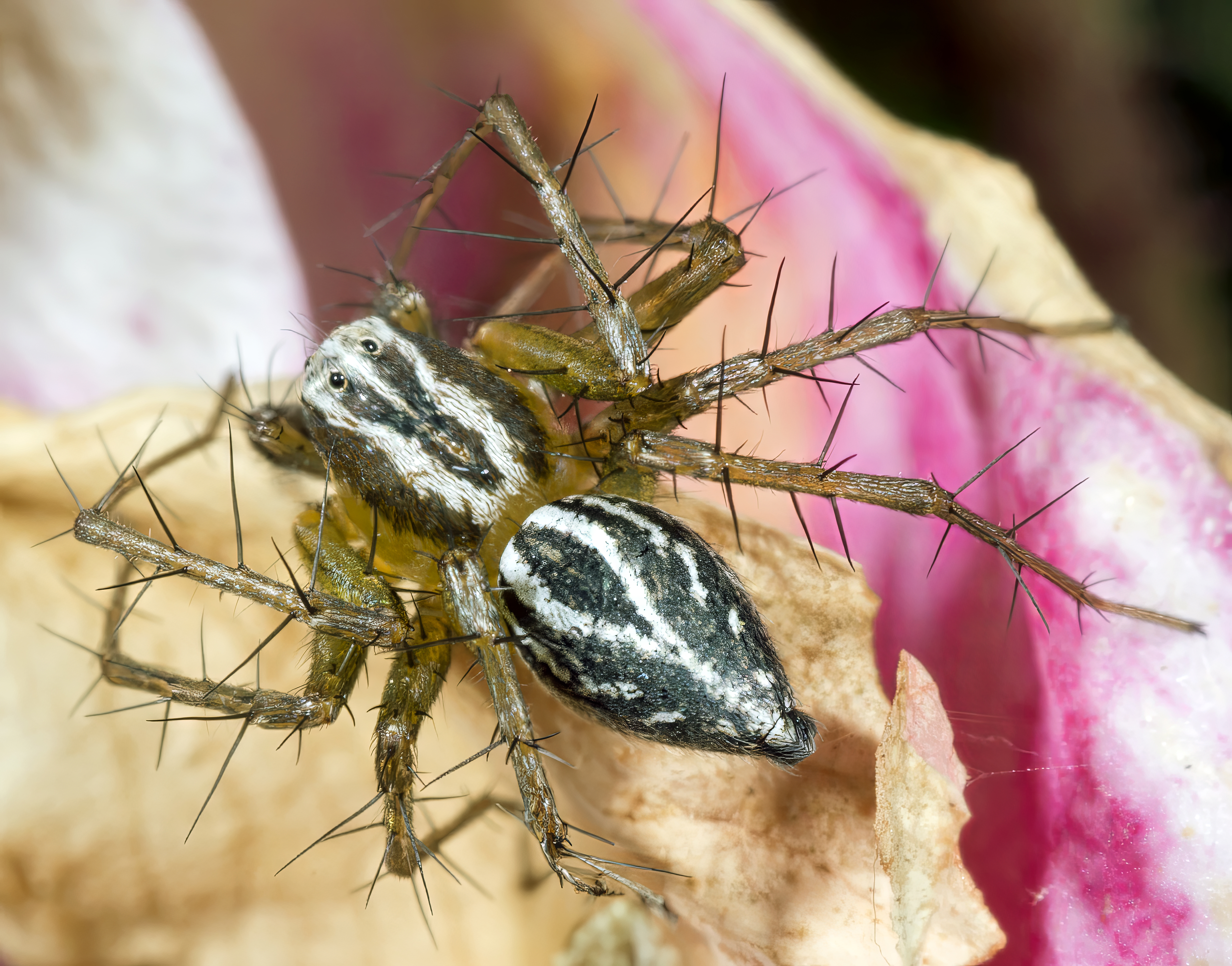
- Dorsal view

Scientific classification
- Kingdom: Animalia
- Phylum: Arthropoda
- Subphylum: Chelicerata
- Class: Arachnida
- Order: Araneae
- Infraorder: Araneomorphae
- Family: Oxyopidae
- Genus: Oxyopes
- Species: O. lineatus

Binomial name
- Oxyopes lineatus Latreille, 1806

Synonyms
- Sphasus lineatus

= Oxyopes lineatus =

Species of spider

Oxyopes lineatus is a species of spider in the family Oxyopidae, the so-called lynx spiders.

They are ambush hunting spiders and do not trap their prey in webs, but subdue their victims with their venomous fangs (chelicerae). They are harmless to humans and larger animals and are not aggressive.

== Description ==
The body colour of Oxyopes lineatus is yellowish to light-brown with a pattern of white markings. Like most spiders the species is sexually dimorphic, the males being distinctly smaller than the females. The body length of the adult male is about 4–5 mm, while that of the female is 6–8 mm. They have eight eyes in total, a pair of two large eyes in front and below them a smaller pair. One pair of medium-sized eyes are high up on the side of the head and another pair of large eyes looks above and backward. This combination of eyes gives these spiders an almost 360^{o} view. As in the Oxyopidae in general, there are long spines on their legs in a basket-like arrangement that assists in confining prey during capture.

== Behaviour ==
Oxyopes lineatus is largely an ambush hunting spider and preys on insects and other small animals. They do not use webs for trapping their prey. Their eyesight is not as good as that of the jumping spiders, but they can locate their prey from a distance of up to 10 cm. Their long legs are very good for running extremely fast, and they jump on their prey like a cat, though where prey is plentiful, such as when insects are actively visiting flowers, these spiders commonly settle down to wait. Using their venom injected through their fangs, they paralyse their prey and eat them. They are active during the day-time, particularly in the sunshine, running and jumping over leaves and grasses.

The venom of Oxyopes lineatus contains peptide toxins called oxotoxins (OxyTx1 and OxyTx2), which were discovered in 2008.

== Subspecies ==
Two sub-species are recognised:

- Oxyopes lineatus lineatus Latreille, 1806
- Oxyopes lineatus occidentalis Kulczynski, 1907 (Italian mainland)

== Distribution and habitat ==
Oxyopes lineatus is primarily a European spider and has been reported from Europe (Portugal, Spain, France, Italy, Slovenia, Belgium, Czechoslovakia, Switzerland, Romania, Ukraine, and southern Russia), Turkey, the Near East, the Caucasus and Central Asia.

They are found most often on small plants near the ground, particularly in bushes and grasses.
