= Oxotoxin =

Group of spider neurotoxins

Oxotoxins, or oxytoxins, are a group of neurotoxins present in the venom of lynx spiders belonging to the genus Oxyopes, hence the name oxytoxin. They are disulfide-rich peptides. Only two types are so far reported from two different species, the larger oxytoxin 1 (OxyTx1) from Oxyopes kitabensis, and the smaller oxytoxin 2 (OxyTx2) from Oxyopes lineatus. OxyTx1, the first known oxytoxin, was discovered in 2002. It was found to enhance the lethal efficacy of the spider venom by acting together with oxyopinins. It is composed of 69 amino acid residue, which are cross-linked by five disulfide bridges. It is a large peptide having a molecular mass of 8059.2 Da; but shows the size of 9,109.4 Da due to the presence of disulfide bridges. It is a potent insecticide, but non-toxic to mice up to 1 μg/20-g mouse. It acts synergistically with oxyopinins of the same venom to increase the insecticidal effect.

Both OxyTx1 and OxyTx2 were isolated in 2008 from O. lineatus. Both of these toxins were found to block voltage-sensitive calcium ion channels. OxyTx2 is made up of 55 amino acid residues and has a molecular mass 6175.2 Da. It is less effective in causing paralysis in Spodoptera litura larvae than Oxytx1.

== Types ==
Oxotoxins are classified as follows:

Name	Recommended name	Size in Da	Amino acid residue	Toxicity (LD_{50}) on S. litura
Oxytoxin 1	Omega-oxotoxin-Ol1a	8058.2	69	5.0 nmol/g
Oxytoxin 2	Omega-oxotoxin-Ol1b	6,186	55	weak activity
