= Emília Pomar de Sousa Machado =

Portuguese writer, poet and spiritualist (1857–1944)

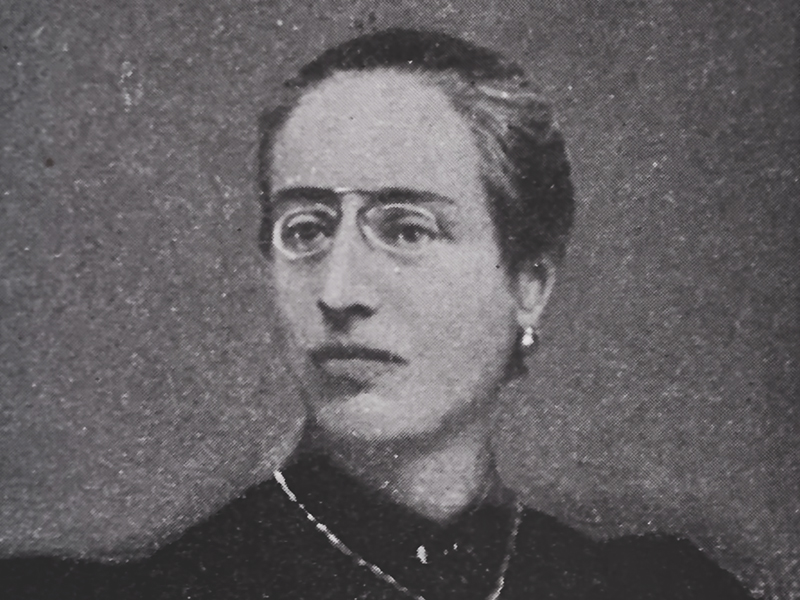
- Born: Emília Adelaide Pomar; 1 July 1857; Cacilhas, Almada, Portugal
- Died: 15 November 1944 (aged 87); Cacilhas
- Occupation(s): Writer; poet
- Known for: Spiritualism

Emília Pomar de Sousa Machado (1857– 1944) was a Portuguese writer and poet who belonged to the Spiritualism movement. She was the great-aunt of the noted painter Júlio Pomar.

== Early life ==
Sousa Machado was born on 1 July 1857, in the parish of Cacilhas, in the Almada municipality of Portugal, situated on the left bank of the Tejo river, south of the capital, Lisbon. She was baptised as Emília Adelaide Pomar, the daughter of Francisco José Pomar, a Galician merchant who had settled in Almada and owned one of the largest olive and olive oil businesses in the area, and Maria do Carmo. Emília was the only daughter of their four children. An opera lover, she attended the Teatro Nacional de São Carlos in Lisbon with her father from a young age. She was fluent in Italian, French, English, Spanish, and Latin, and played the piano.

On 2 December 1876, she married José Severo de Sousa Machado (1854–1918), a native of Lisbon and a captain in the merchant navy. With him, she had a son, Francisco Pomar de Sousa Machado (1877–1940), a partner of the Cacilhas River Company, which operated the Tagus crossing.

== Later life ==
Sousa Machado was the author of several poems, such as the poetic work As Pecadoras – Versos inspirados pela Luz de Alva (The Sinners – Verses inspired by the "Light of Dawn", dedicated to the spirit of Martha) in 1923, published by the Spiritualist Centre of Braga, and the poem Ignota Almada (Unknown Almada) in which she recounted and paid tribute to the resistance of the people of Almada against the Castilian troops during the Naval Battle of the Tejo in 1384. This was later set to music by Leonel Duarte Ferreira (1894–1959). She translated Ernest Daudet's novel The Crime of Jean Malory, which was published in the newspaper O Sul do Tejo in 1885 under the title of O crime do João Malory, and she contributed to several periodicals and literary magazines, such as A Lyra, O Domingo – Semanário Republicano Radical, O Espírita, O Portimonense, and O Eborense.

As a spiritualist, she contributed to the magazine Luz e Caridade (Light and Charity) for over 30 years and competed in the 1940 Spiritualist Floral Games, held by the Centro Espírita Luz e Amor, receiving first prize with the poem Outra vez na Terra (Once again on Earth).

== Death ==
Sousa Machado died on 15 November 1944, in Cacilhas, where a street was named in her honour.
