= Patricia Ribeiro =

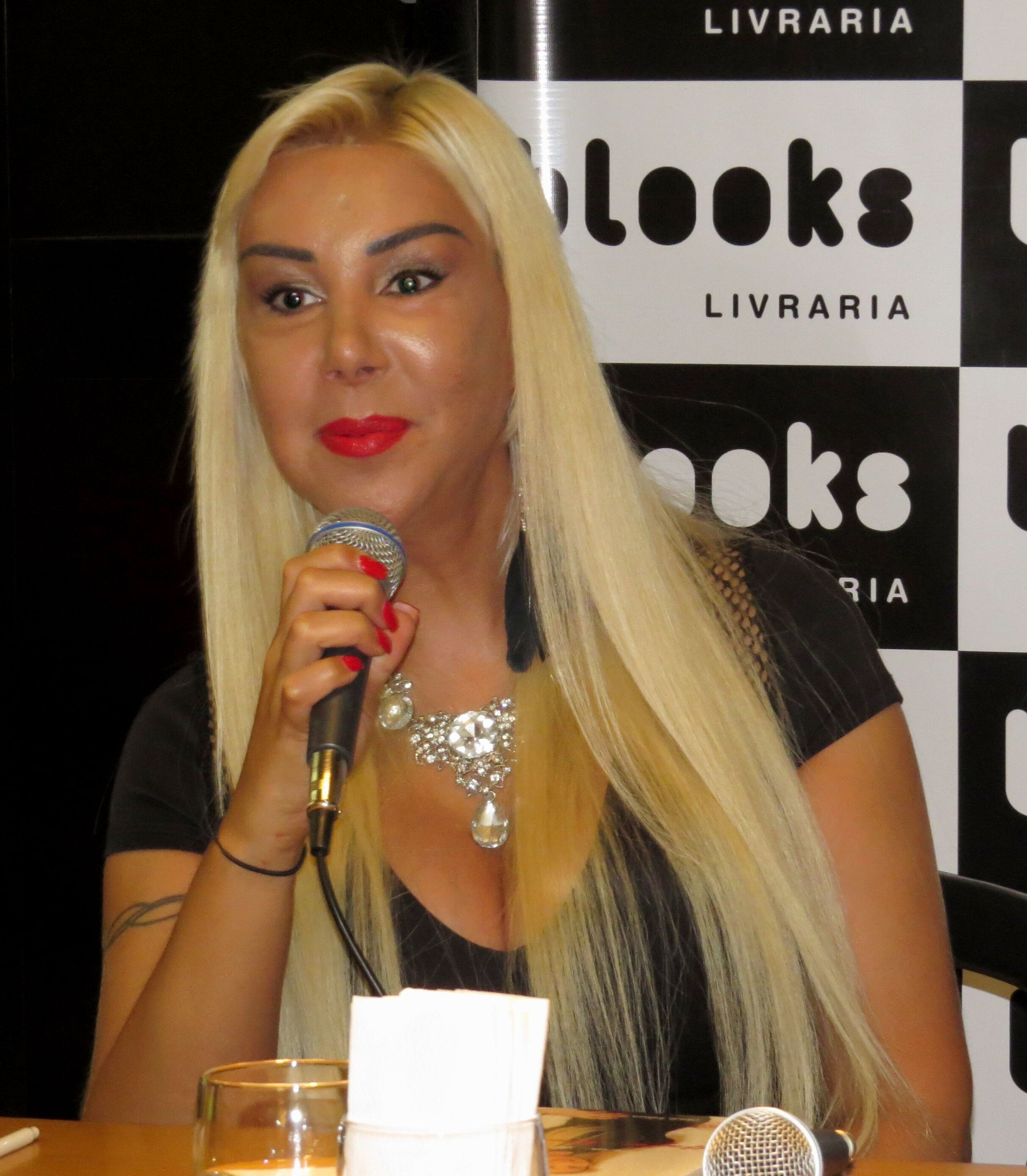
- Ribeiro in 2015
- Born: Patricia Nogueira Ribeiro; 11 October 1981 (age 44); Almada, Portugal
- Occupations: Singer; songwriter; model; dancer
- Years active: 1992–present
- Musical career
- Genres: Pop; Latin pop; electropop
- Labels: Distri Records (2011–present); CD Baby (2012–present)
- Website: patriciaribeiro.net

Patrícia Nogueira Ribeiro (born 11 October 1981), better known as Patrícia Ribeiro is a Portuguese transsexual singer, songwriter, model and dancer. She is contracted by DistriRecords label. She was the fourth person from her country to undergo sex reassignment surgery and be its first transsexual singer.

== 1981–2011: Early years ==
Patrícia was born Nuno Nogueira Ribeiro, in Cova da Piedade, Almada, 11 October 1981. She began his musical career at age eleven. She came to be known as Nuno, in youth group Onda Choc, joined in several children's and youth groups Jovens Cantores de Lisboa, directed by Ana Faria.

In the 2000s, after the youth groups she participated in, she attempted a solo career over the course of two years, even releasing a CD "O Sonho Nasce" at age 19 as Ricky, a popular singer who didn't avenge.

In 2001, to promote her debut album "O Sonho Nasce" and the first single "Sabor do Teu Beijo" participated in several programs such as: Made In Portugal by RTP.

In 2004, she starred in a documentary aired on Sociedade Independente de Comunicação "Grande Reportagem" about the difficulties of transsexuals with their families, a theme that was then taboo, and impacting viewers of "Jornal da Noite".

On 4 November 2008, Ribeiro underwent a sex change operation at Hospital Santa Maria in Lisbon. In 2011 she decided to pursue a solo career and released her first work titled É Real, an album with eleven tracks, emphasizing dance music and Latin rhythms.

== 2012–15: Lotaria do Amor, autobiography and success in Brazil ==
In 2012, she started recording her second album, produced by José Felix. Launched in 2013, Lotaria do Amor was awarded a gold record for sales exceeding 7500 units. Her first single (of the same name) gained radio play in multiple countries. In 2014, her autobiography "Ontem Homem, Hoje Mulher" was published by Chiado Editora.

In 2015, she released her Beat Sexy with eleven tracks, produced by José Felix. It included "Portugal em Festa" named after the Program Sociedade Independente de Comunicação. She took a third trip to Brazil to promote the album and to perform a new version of Lotaria do Amor, in São Paulo, with the participation of the Brazilian and also transsexual model Thalita Zampirolli.

After her return to Portugal, she began to release tracks on her new social networks "Põe-me KO" from the album "Beat Sexy". The music video was recorded in Lisbon, Portugal with the participation of actress Sara Norte. In that same year she returned to Brazil for presentations in television programs, interviews and concerts with participation of Rogéria and Léo Aquilla. The end of the "Beat Sexy" era was marked by the release of the single "Estou de Saida" in which only the audio was released on its official channel.

== Since 2016: Chama Por Mim, controversy and imprisonment ==
In 2016, she started recording her fourth studio álbum "Chama Por Mim", produced by José Felix, announced a bonus track with Brazilian singer Gretchen and had the first single "Boys (Meu Principe Encantado)" with the music video recorded at Arpoador and Ipanema beaches, both located in the city of Rio de Janeiro, RJ – Brazil. The release of the track had great repercussion in Brazil, her first performances in some television programs "Mulheres", "Superpop", "A Tarde é Sua", "A Tarde é Show" and "Em Revista". After her return to Portugal, she released the single on some television shows in Portugal, "Portugal em Festa" and "Grande Tarde" by SIC. "After the success of the track, it was cherished as "Hit of Summer 2016 – Portugal" prompting speculation of alleged rivalry with singer Ruth Marlene, who has released the track "É Brutal." In an interview, the singer claimed there was no rivalry between the two and yes an exchange of barbs between the fans. The second single "O Amor e o Poder (Como uma Deusa)" was announced in May, with its passage in Brazil and after several comparisons in television programs in which they claimed "is the Portuguese Rosanah", in commemoration launched the music video on 6 July 2016, the same was recorded in São Paulo and had as model her husband Fábio Andrade. At the end of 2016 Patrícia Ribeiro was arrested and is in the Tires jail accused of having extorted about 400 thousand euros from a businessman who threatened to divulge photos of BDSM practices (bondage, domination, sadism and masochism). The artist and her boyfriend, both accused of qualified extortion, were arrested on 9 December 2016 after an investigation by the Lisbon Public Prosecutor's Office. She was eventually condemned to 7 years in prison.

== Discography ==
| Year | Information | Singles | Notes |
|---|---|---|---|
| 2000 | O Sonho Nasce: Release: 2000; Record company: Independent; Format: CD | 1. "Sabor do Teu Beijo" | |
| 2011 | É Real: Release: 2011; Record company: DistriRecords; Format: CD | 1. "É Real"; 2. "Farei Tudo Pra Te Ter"; 3. "Eras Tu Que Eu Sonhava" | - |
| 2013 | Lotaria do Amor: Release: 2013; Record company: DistriRecords; Format: CD | 1. "Zumba sem Fim"; 2. "Lotaria do Amor"; 3. "Conquistador" | - |
| 2015 | Beat Sexy: Release: 2015; Record company: DistriRecords; Format: CD | 1. "Beat Sexy"; 2. "Põe-me KO"; 3. "Estou de Saida" | - |
| 2016 | Chama Por Mim: Release: 2016; Record company: DistriRecords; Format: CD | 1. "Boys (Meu Príncipe Encantado)"; 2. "O Amor e o Poder (Como Uma Deusa)" | - |
