= Feijóo =

- Pronunciation: Galician: [fejˈʃɔ] Spanish: [fejˈxo(o)] European Portuguese: [fɐjˈʒɔ, fɐjˈʒɐ̃w]

Origin
- Region of origin: Galicia and Portugal.

Other names
- Variant forms: Feijoo, Feijó, Feixó, Feijão, Feijido

Feijóo, Feijoo or Feijó (among other variants) is a Spanish and Portuguese surname of Galician origin, derived from the word feixó, meaning "bean" (probably used as a nickname for a bald man).

People with surname or its variants include:

- Alfonso Feijoo, Spanish footballer
- Benito Jerónimo Feijóo y Montenegro, Spanish scholar
- Diogo Antônio Feijó, Brazilian politician
- Flor de Liz Feijoo (born 1964), Uruguayan trade unionist
- João da Silva Feijó, Portuguese naturalist
- Lorena Feijóo, Cuban ballet dancer
- Lorna Feijóo, Cuban ballet dancer
- Pablo Feijoo, Spanish rugby sevens coach and player
- Samuel Feijóo, Cuban writer
- Juan Carlos Navarro Feijoo, Spanish basketball player
- Alberto Núñez Feijóo, Spanish politician
