= Oxyopinin =

Oxyopinins are a group of peptide toxins present in the venom of lynx spiders belonging to the genus Oxyopes, from which they derive their name.

== Properties ==
Oxyopinins have antimicrobial, haemolytic, and insecticidal activities. They are the largest linear cationic amphipathic peptides detected in the venom of any spider. They are structurally α-helical peptides.

== Subtypes ==
The first five peptides, namely oxyopinins 1, 2a, 2b, 2c, and 2d, were described in 2002 from Oxyopes kitabensis.

Oxyopinin 1 is composed of 48 amino acid residues, with a molecular mass of 5221.2 Da. It has significant amino acid sequence similarity to other venoms of other animals. For example, it has 20% sequence similarity with the ant insecticidal peptide ponericinL2. It is also 29% identical to the amino acid residues of the frog antimicrobial peptide dermaseptin.

Oxyopinins 2a, 2b, 2c, and 2d (originally designated oxyopinins 2, 3, 4, and 5 respectively) are very similar in their sequences. At least 27 out of 37 their amino acid residues are conserved, that is, identical. Their molecular sizes are 4127.1, 4146.9, 4064.7, and 4156.8 Da respectively.

All the oxyopinins indicate their secondary structure essentially as alpha-helical. They cause disruption of both biological membranes and artificial vesicles, particularly to those rich in phosphatidylcholine. They act together with neurotoxins called oxytoxins from the same venom for increased effectiveness as insecticide.

The sixth peptide oxyopinin 4a (Oxt-4a) was reported in 2011 from Oxyopes takobius. It is composed of 77 amino acid residues, and has molecular mass of 9,205 Da. It contains a single disulfide bond, Cys4-Cys10, at the N-terminal, which is different from any other spider toxin known so far. Further, unlike other arachnid toxins, Oxt-4a is very similar to defense peptides from the skin of frogs that contain the so-called Rana-box motif (a C-terminal disulfide-enclosed loop).
