= Flor de Liz Feijoo =

Uruguayan trade union leader (born 1964)

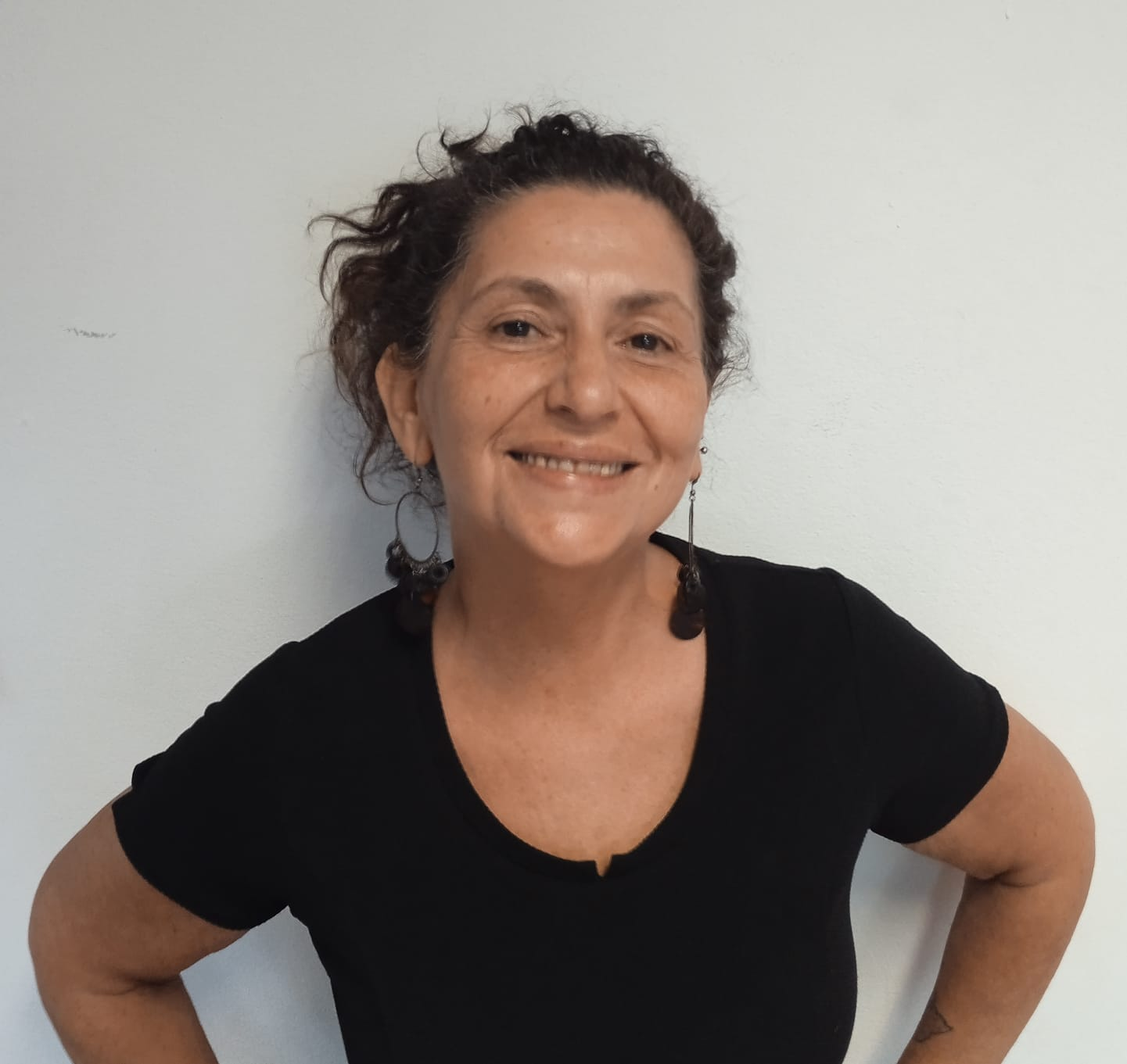
- In 2023
- Born: 11 October 1964 (age 62); Montevideo, Uruguay
- Occupations: Labor leader, textile worker
- Political party: Communist Party of Uruguay

Flor de Liz Feijoo (born 11 October 1964) is a Uruguayan textile worker, trade union leader, and feminist. She led the Gender, Equity, and Diversity Secretariat of the Intersyndical Plenary of Workers – National Confederation of Workers (Spanish: Plenario Intersindical de Trabajadores – Convención Nacional de Trabajadores; PIT-CNT) from November 2021 to June 2025.

She has been a director representing the PIT-CNT at the National Employment and Vocational Training Institute (Spanish: Instituto Nacional de Empleo y Formación Profesional; INEFOP) since July 2025.

== Early life ==
Flor de Liz Feijoo was born in Montevideo in 1964.

Her union involvement began at the Reston factory, located at Juan Cabal and Urquiza streets, in 2004. Following a wage dispute, she joined the union and began organizing the plant's workers, who until then had never had union representation. After another conflict over wage advances, she organized a plant occupation.

== Career ==
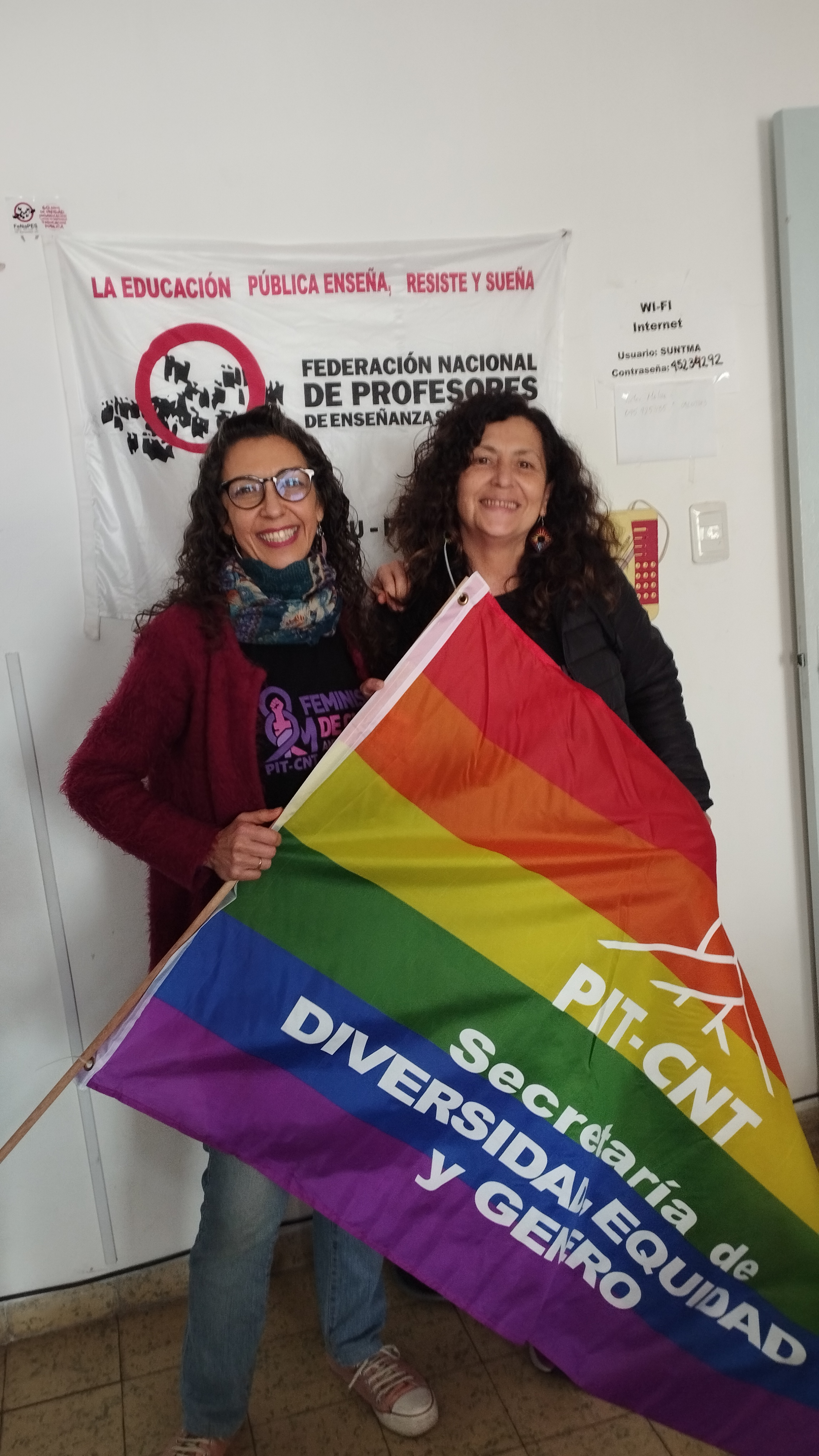
Feijoo, representing SUA, and Judith Varela from AUTE, at the FeNaPES Colonia premises in the lead-up to the 7th Diversity March

She is the first general secretary of the Single Needleworkers' Union (Spanish: Sindicato Único de la Aguja; SUA). In 2006, she joined the Communist Party of Uruguay (PCU).

In June 2018, at the 107th International Labour Conference in Geneva, United Nations, she was responsible for speaking in the plenary session on behalf of the PIT-CNT, representing the workers.

=== Speech before the ILO ===
As the general secretary of the Needleworkers' Union, Flor de Liz Feijoo addressed the International Labour Organization (ILO), speaking about collective bargaining, decent work, injustices, equality and equity towards women, violence and harassment in the world of work, and other issues that concern workers, such as the labor reform promoted by the government of Michel Temer.

She expressed concern "about the problem of work in the areas occupied by the Israeli State, in territories owned by the Palestinian Government, which we reject because of its complete lack of contribution to regional and world peace." She also emphasized that "decent work is impossible amidst war and the suffering of a people."

She rejected "violence and harassment against women, as well as the inadmissibility of slavery, child labor, the lack of freedom to engage in trade union activity, and each and every one of those aspects linked to the concept of decent work."

She also highlighted the unique characteristics of Uruguay and the rich history of its labor movement, as well as the perspective of women. "In my country, Uruguay, this garment worker, a union leader in her sector, a woman, head of household, mother, activist, and citizen, exercises her right to determine her salary and all her working conditions on an equal footing with her male colleagues, while also maintaining her right to defend her safety, health, and a suitable physical and mental environment in her workplace, as a result of her role as a union representative, and within the framework of a comprehensive system of labor relations and collective bargaining that governs in my country, and whose legitimacy, fairness, and conformity to the standards of this Organization are defended by the Uruguayan labor movement."

=== 24-hour general strike of working women ===
Feijoo spearheaded the first 24-hour strike by working women, organized by the PIT-CNT as part of the international feminist strike. The aim was to reclaim the role of feminists that have been increasingly eroding an age-old culture. "Today, working women in this country speak of class feminism and demand the rights of all workers, both salaried and unsalaried. And we are striving for the organization of all women," she said.

United under the slogan "Feminist struggle against hunger and oppression," 40 demonstrations were held on 8 March 2023, in various locations across the country. They were led by women who run community kitchens.
