= Feijó (Almada) =

Civil parish in Lisbon, Portugal

- Civil parish
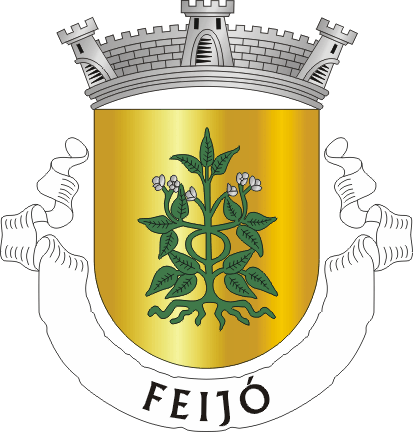
- Coat of arms

- Location in Portugal
- Coordinates: 38.653°N 9.165°W
- Country: Portugal
- Region: Lisbon
- Metropolitan area: Lisbon
- District: Setúbal
- Municipality: Almada
- Disbanded: 2013

Area
  - Total: 3.94 km^{2} (1.52 sq mi)

Population (2011)
  - Total: 18,884
  - Density: 4,800/km^{2} (12,000/sq mi)
- Time zone: UTC+00:00 (WET)
  - Summer (DST): UTC+01:00 (WEST)

Feijó is a former civil parish in the municipality of Almada, Lisbon metropolitan area, Portugal. In 2013, the parish merged into the new parish Laranjeiro e Feijó. The population in 2011 was 18,884, in an area of 3.94 km^{2}.

== History ==
The history of Feijó dates back to the 16th century. Urban development of the area began in the middle of the 20th century. The parish was created under law No. 17-B/93 on June 11, 1993, separating it from the parish of Cova da Piedade.
