= Oxyopes takobius =

Scientific classification
- Kingdom: Animalia
- Phylum: Arthropoda
- Subphylum: Chelicerata
- Class: Arachnida
- Order: Araneae
- Infraorder: Araneomorphae
- Family: Oxyopidae
- Genus: Oxyopes
- Species: O. takobius

Binomial name
- Oxyopes takobius Andreeva & Tyschchenko, 1969

Species of spider

Oxyopes takobius is a species of spiders in the genus Oxyopes of the lynx spider family, Oxyopidae. The species was first described in 1969, and is found from Central Asia to China. Its venom contains a peptide toxin called oxyopinin (oxyopinin 4a), which was discovered in 2002.

This species has been misidentified in pharmacological research as "Oxyopes kitabensis."
