= Laranjeiro e Feijó =

- Civil parish
- Location in Portugal
- Coordinates: 38.657°N 9.150°W
- Country: Portugal
- Region: Lisbon
- Metropolitan area: Lisbon
- District: Setúbal
- Municipality: Almada

Area
  - Total: 7.82 km^{2} (3.02 sq mi)

Population (2011)
  - Total: 39,872
  - Density: 5,100/km^{2} (13,000/sq mi)
- Time zone: UTC+00:00 (WET)
  - Summer (DST): UTC+01:00 (WEST)

Laranjeiro e Feijó is a civil parish in the municipality of Almada, Portugal. It was formed in 2013 by the merger of the former parishes Laranjeiro and Feijó. The population in 2011 was 39,872, in an area of 7.82 km^{2}.
