= Almada =

- Municipality
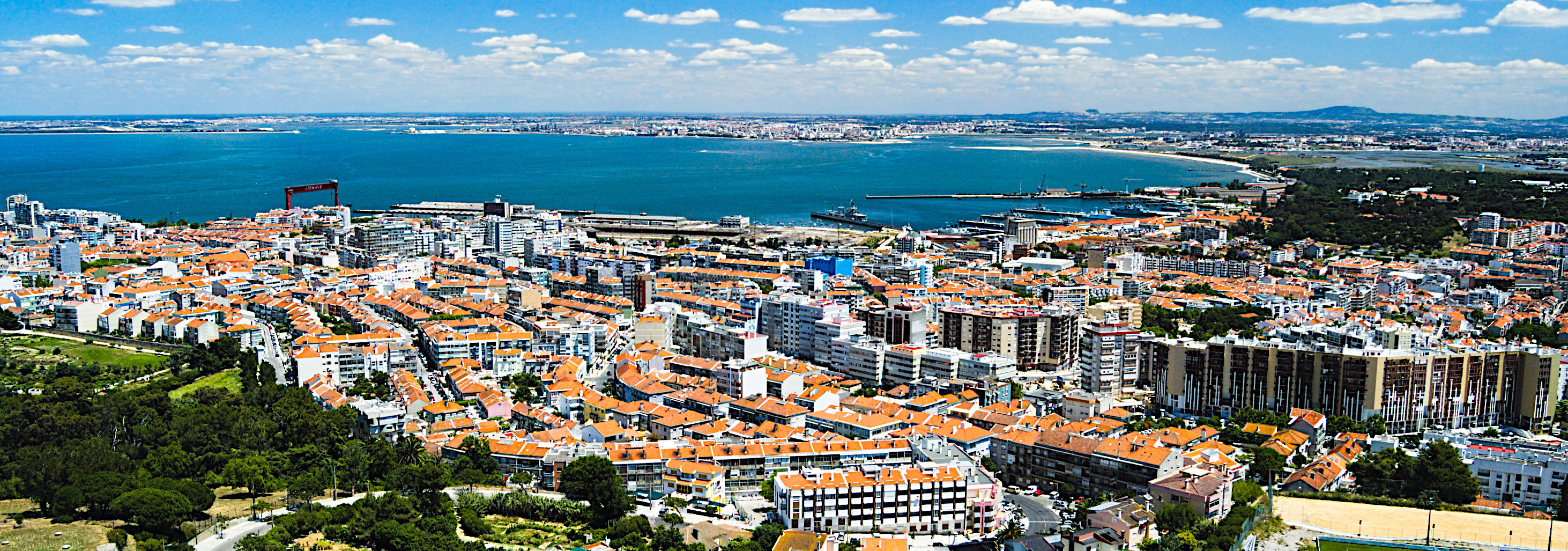
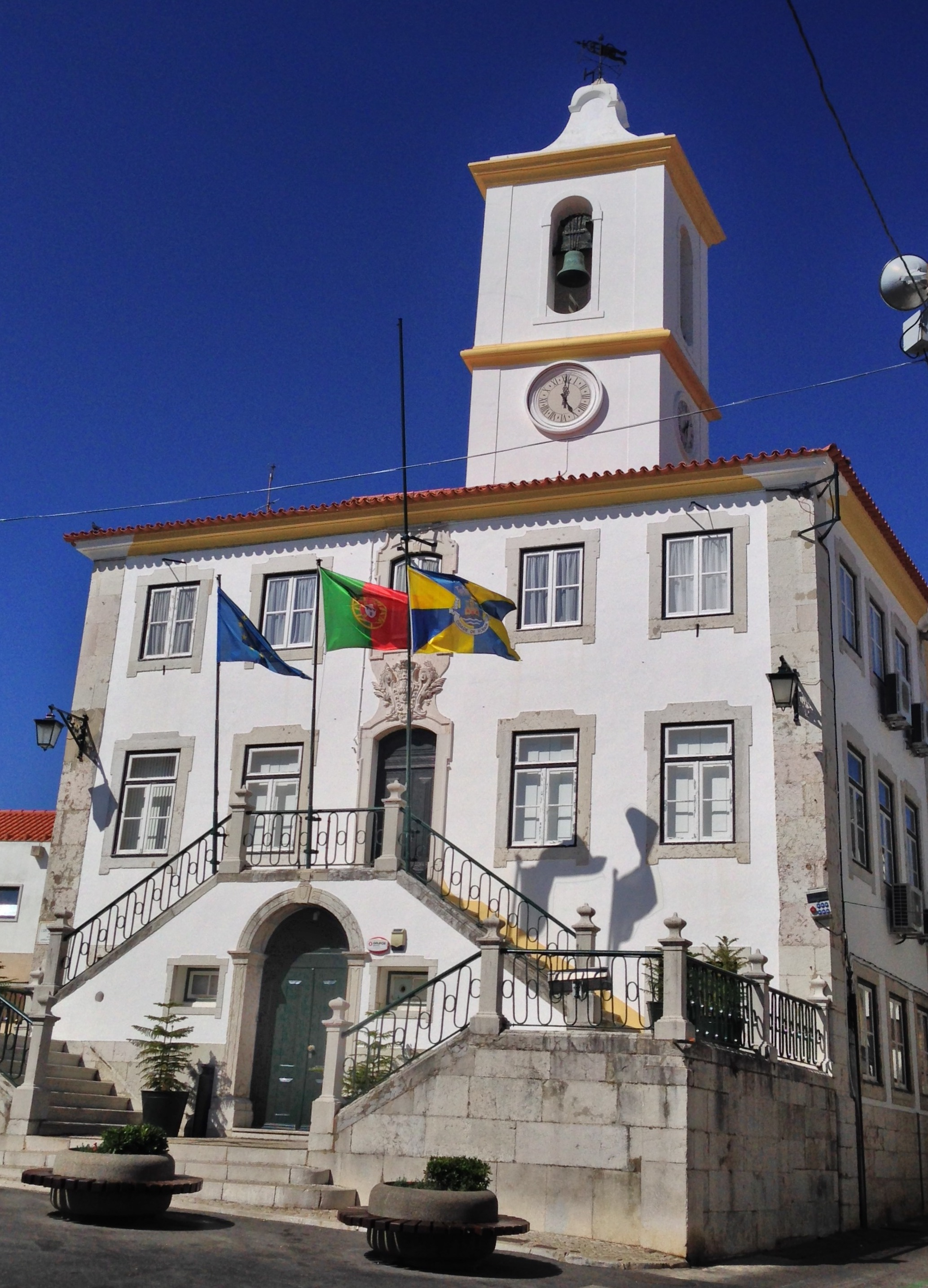
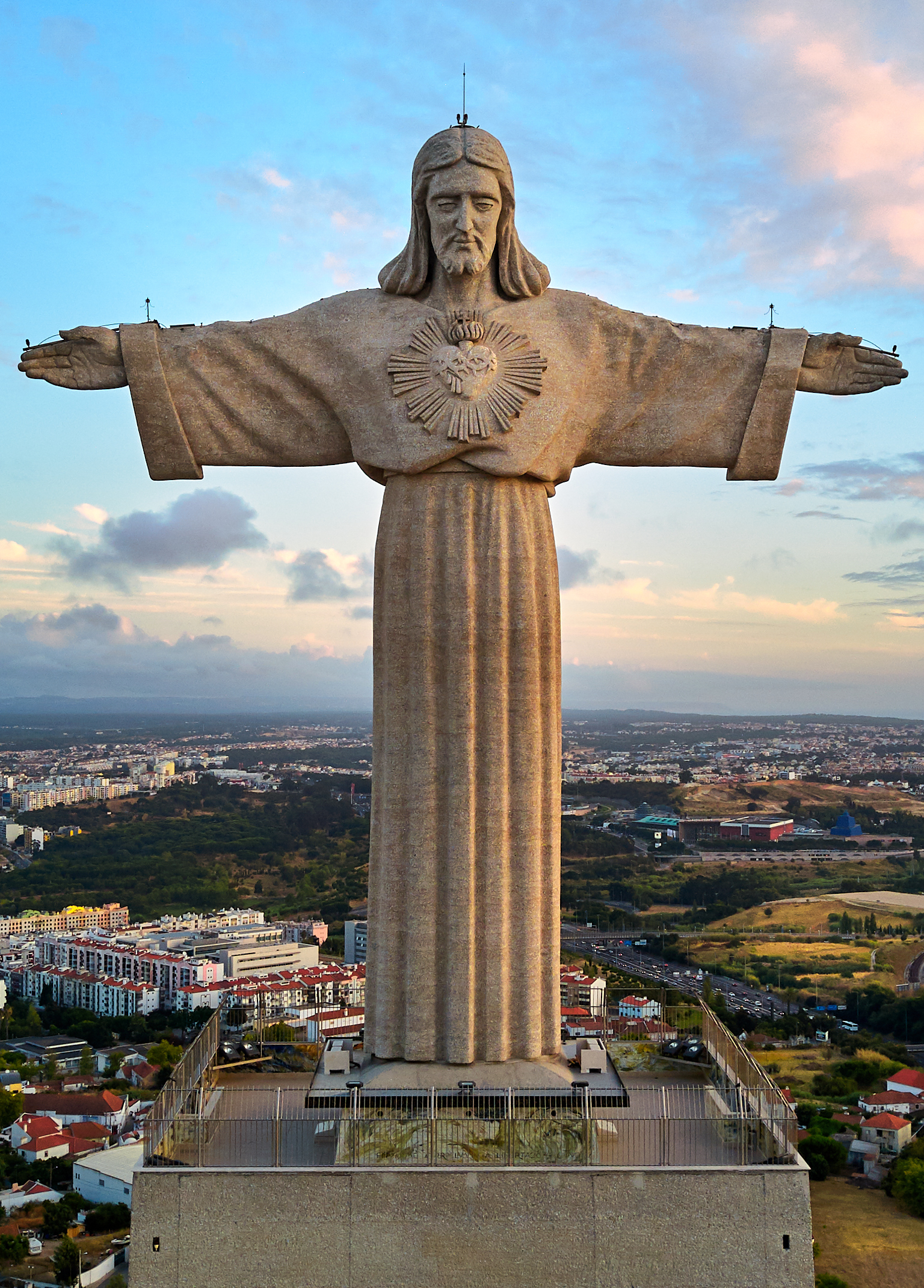
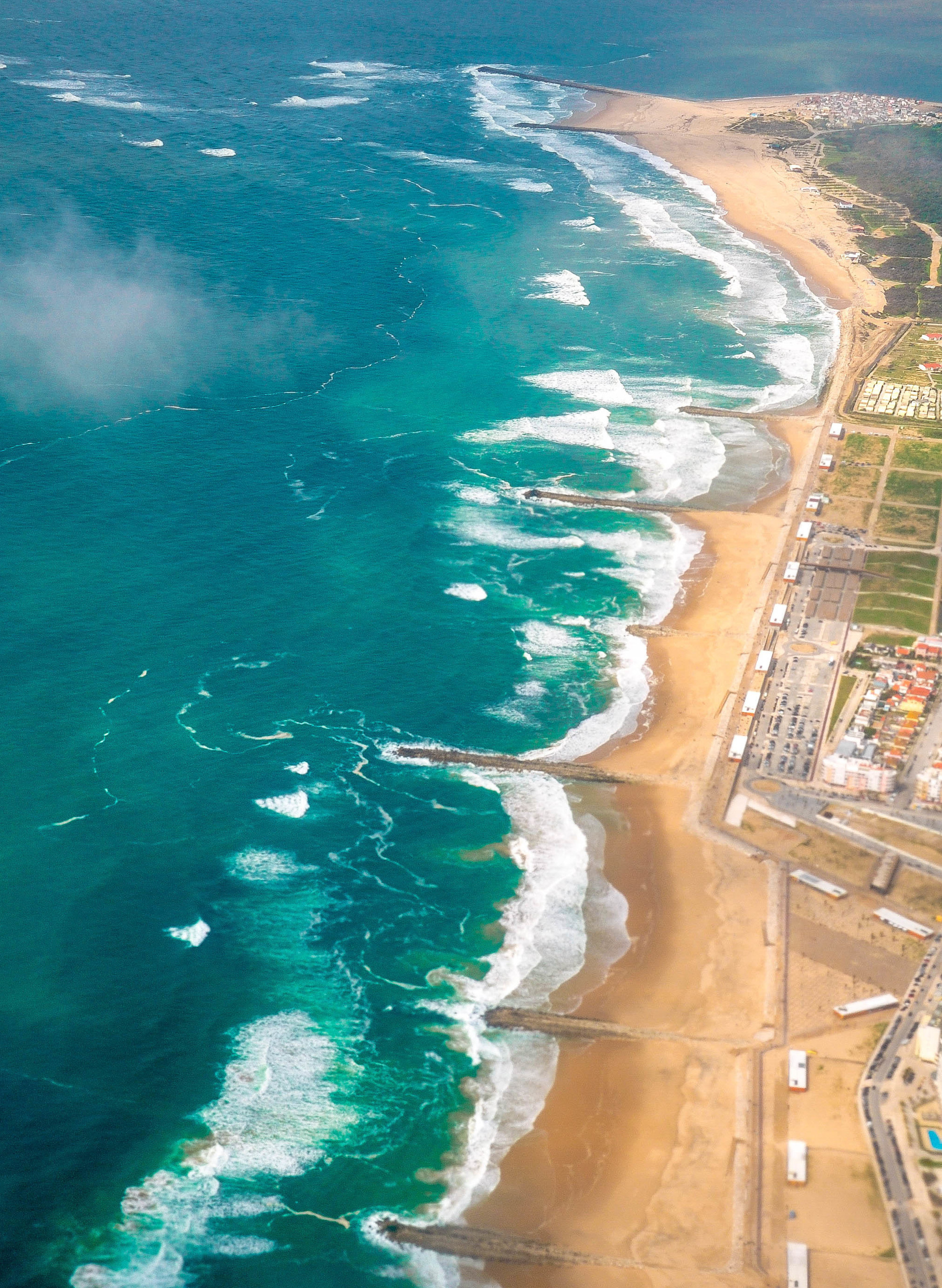
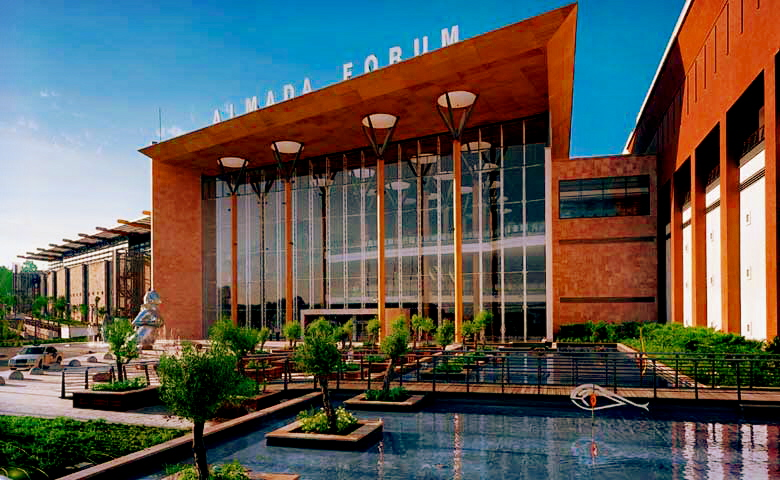
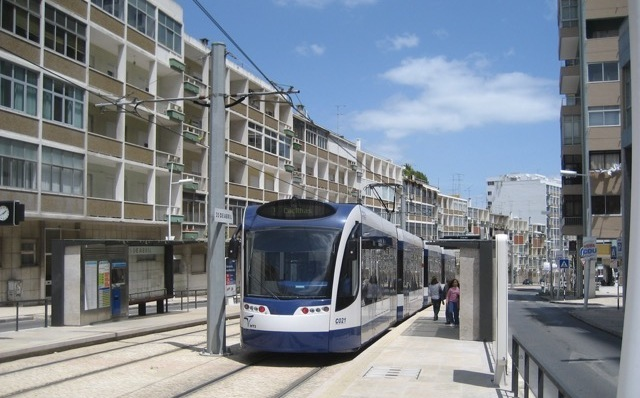

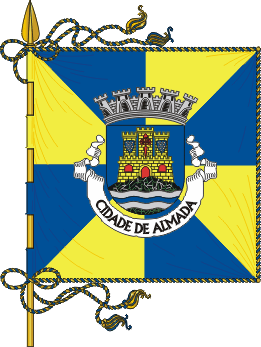
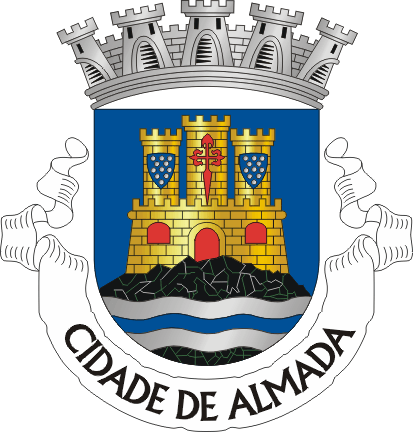
- Flag Coat of arms
- Interactive map of Almada
- Location in Portugal
- Coordinates: 38°40′49″N 9°9′30″W
- Country: Portugal
- Region: Lisbon
- Metropolitan area: Lisbon
- District: Setúbal
- Parishes: 5

Government
  - President: Inês de Medeiros (PS)

Area
  - Total: 70.21 km^{2} (27.11 sq mi)
- Elevation: 33 m (108 ft)
- Lowest elevation: 0 m (0 ft)

Population (2011)
  - Total: 174,030
  - Density: 2,479/km^{2} (6,420/sq mi)
- Time zone: UTC+00:00 (WET)
  - Summer (DST): UTC+01:00 (WEST)
- Postal code: 2805
- Area code: 21
- Patron: São João Baptista
- Website: www.m-almada.pt

Almada (European Portuguese pronunciation: [alˈmaðɐ]) is a city and municipality in Portugal, located on the southern margin of the Tagus River, within the Lisbon Metropolitan Area. The city is connected to Lisbon by the 25 de Abril Bridge. The population of the municipality in 2011 was 174,030, in an area of 70.21 km^{2}. The urbanized core center, the city of Almada proper, had a population of 101,500 in 2001.

== History ==
Human presence in the area of Almada dates to the end of the Neolithic period about 5000 years ago; archeological excavations performed in the municipality suggest that non-sedentary nomadic tribes may have occupied this location sporadically. The gradual development of settlement here made its greatest advance with the coming of Islamic civilization, when Muslims constructed a fort at Almada to defend and monitor the entrance to the Tagus River. Lying across the river from Lisbon, the area of Almada was a crossroads for a succession of various peoples who traded along the Tagus, including Phoenicians, Romans and Moors.

As one of the principal Arab military bases along the southern margin of the Tagus, Almada was conquered by the Christian forces of Afonso I with the aid of English Crusaders in 1147. Alongside these Christians there lived many free Moors and Jews, under the royal protection guaranteed them by Afonso I in the charter of 1170 (which applied to all the former Moorish strongholds at Lisbon, Almada, Palmela and Alcácer).

Almada received a foral from King Sancho I in 1190, although it came at a price: Miramolim Jacub-Abu-Jassuf, son of the Moorish leader who had laid siege to Santarém in 1171, was angered by the Christian victories and gathered a large army. He boldly attacked in the north, conquering Alcácer do Sal and Silves, while forcing the residents of Almada, Palmela and other towns along the Tagus into hiding. It would be some time after the death of Sancho before this region would be restored to Portuguese control.

When this event occurred with the success of the Reconquista in driving the Muslims out, the Order of Santiago, a donatorio of Almada after 28 October 1186, had an important role in the territory (especially between the Tagus and Sado Rivers). In this role, it facilitated the repopulation of acquired territories and was the beneficiary of the various local economies.

== Geography ==
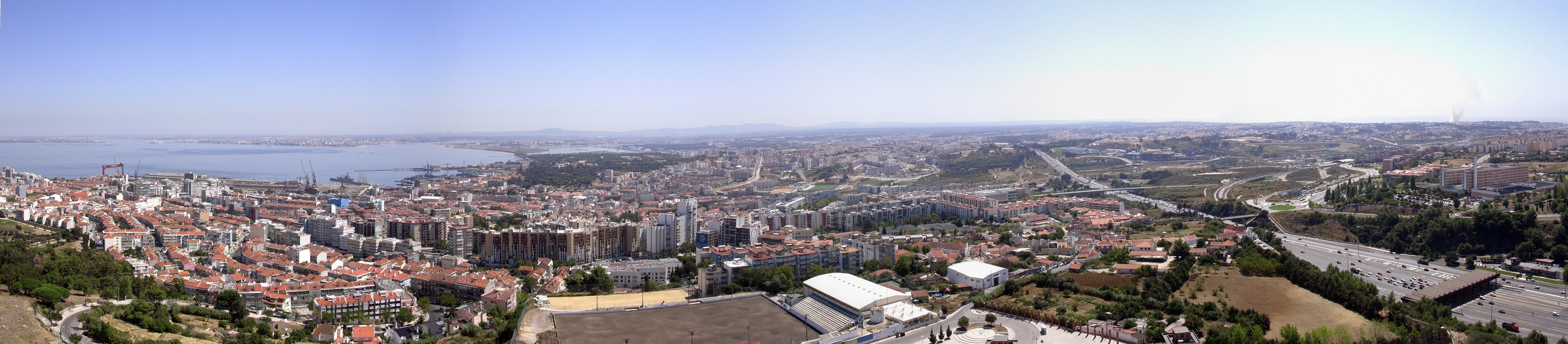
Panoramic view of Almada seen from the Sanctuary of Christ the King.

Although small in area, the city of Almada has a large population. It is bounded to the southeast by Seixal, to the south by Sesimbra, to the west by the Atlantic Ocean and to the north and northeast by the Tagus River. At Cacilhas, its main port, ferry boats transport visitors and local residents across to Lisbon daily, while the 25 de Abril Bridge, which spans the Tagus, is traversed by rail, commercial and personal vehicles daily. Almada is considered a transportation hub and a fast-growing suburb; its coast has several sandy beaches and panoramic vistas.

Located in the district of Setúbal, the municipality includes two cities, Almada and Costa da Caparica, and is divided into five civil parishes:

- Almada, Cova da Piedade, Pragal e Cacilhas
- Caparica e Trafaria
- Charneca de Caparica e Sobreda
- Costa da Caparica
- Laranjeiro e Feijó

== Demographics ==
Historical population

| Year | Pop. | ±% |
|---|---|---|
| 1864 | 10,192 | — |
| 1878 | 11,896 | +16.7% |
| 1890 | 13,530 | +13.7% |
| 1900 | 15,764 | +16.5% |
| 1911 | 18,076 | +14.7% |
| 1920 | 20,291 | +12.3% |
| 1930 | 23,694 | +16.8% |
| 1940 | 29,546 | +24.7% |

| Year | Pop. | ±% |
|---|---|---|
| 1950 | 43,768 | +48.1% |
| 1960 | 70,968 | +62.1% |
| 1970 | 107,575 | +51.6% |
| 1981 | 147,690 | +37.3% |
| 1991 | 151,783 | +2.8% |
| 2001 | 160,825 | +6.0% |
| 2011 | 174,030 | +8.2% |
| 2021 | 177,238 | +1.8% |

Source: INE

== Transportation ==
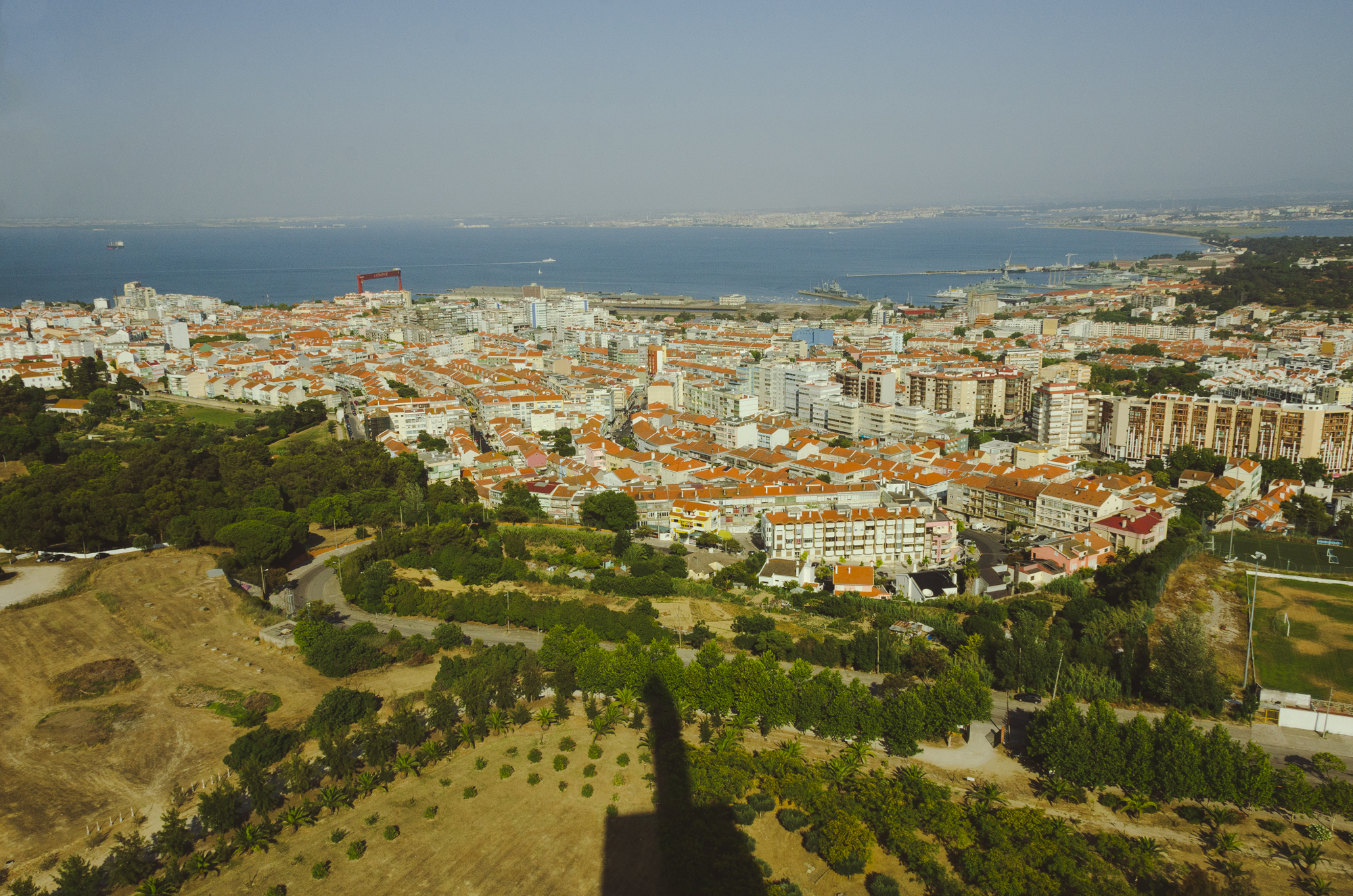
Almada, Lisbon

The 25 de Abril Bridge links Lisbon and Almada, which are on opposite sides of the Tagus river. The municipality is served by a light-rail transit system, the Metro Transportes do Sul, linking it to the suburban rail system (Fertagus) serving Greater Lisbon and the municipality of Seixal.

== Notable citizens ==
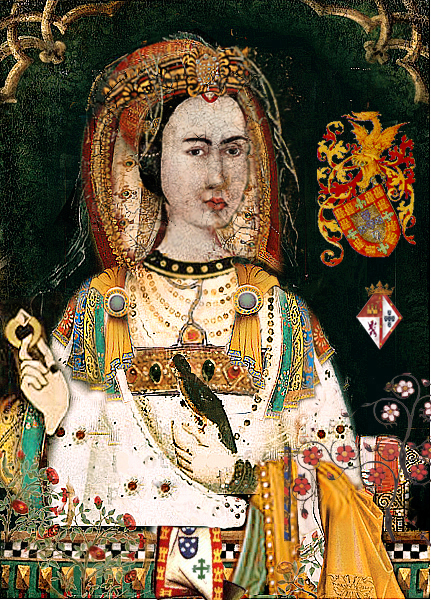
Joana de Portugal

=== Public service ===
- Joan of Portugal (1439–1475) Queen of Castile as the second wife of King Henry IV of Castile.
- Elvira Fortunato (born 1964) a Portuguese scientist, professor in the Materials Science Department at the NOVA University of Lisbon
- Diana Prata (born ca.1975) neuroscientist, head of the Biomedical Neuroscience at the University of Lisbon, brought up in Almada

=== Arts ===
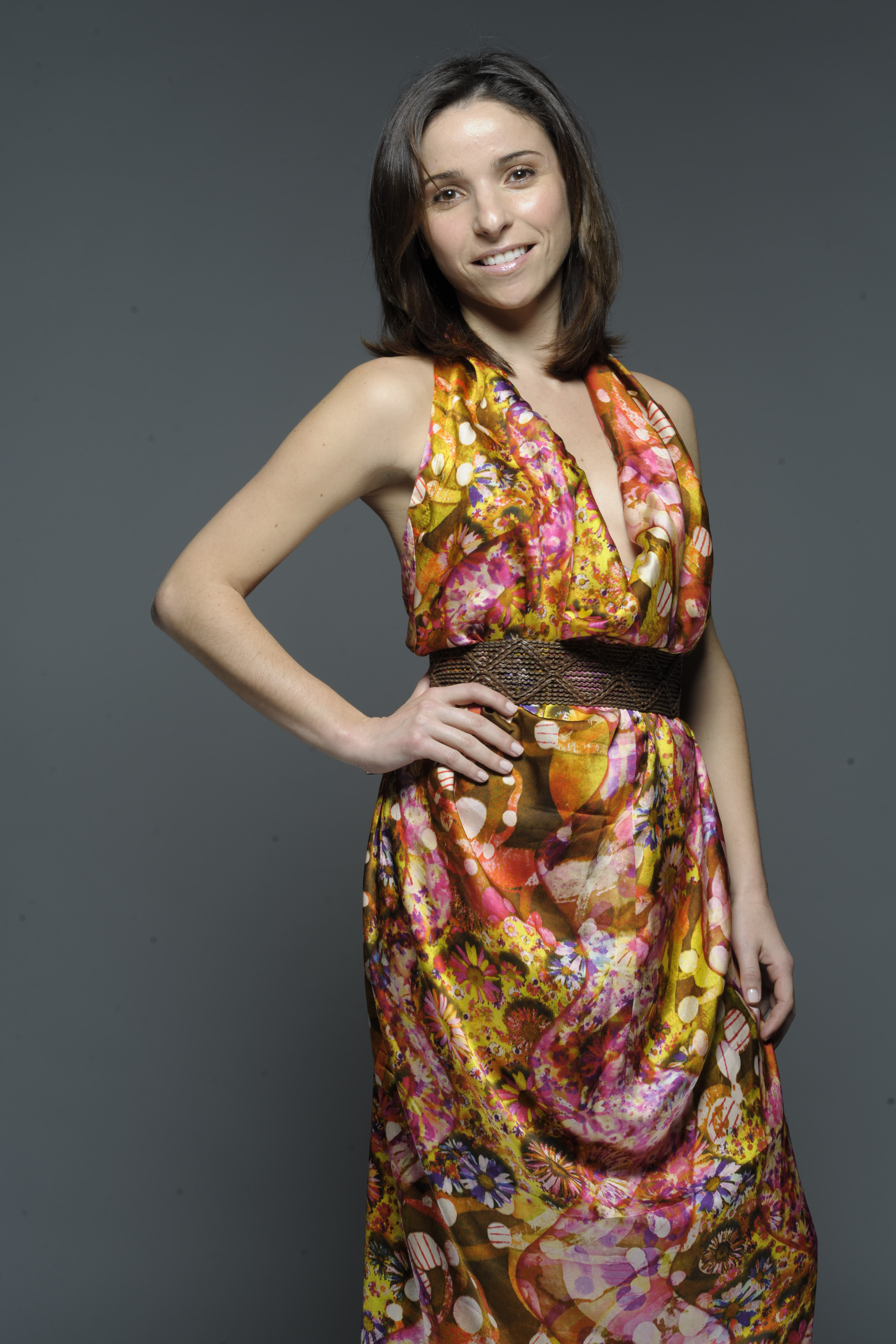
Anabela, 2009

- Emília Pomar de Sousa Machado (1857–1944), writer, poet and spiritualist
- Vitor Gonçalves (born 1963) a Portuguese theatre director
- UHF (formed 1970's) rock band formed in Almada
- Anabela Braz Pires (born 1976) known as Anabela, singer and musical theatre actress.
- Xutos & Pontapés, (Wiki PT) (formed 1978) a Portuguese Rock band
- Sara Tavares (born 1978) a Portuguese singer, composer, guitarist and percussionist, family from Almada
- Pedro Barateiro (born 1979) a Portuguese artist
- Patricia Ribeiro (born 1981) transsexual singer, songwriter, dancer and convicted extortionist.
- Da Weasel (formed 1993) a Portuguese hip-hop band/rock band from Almada
- Aenima (formed 1997) a Portuguese dark wave, rock band
- Ava Inferi (2005–2013) a Portuguese Doom Metal band
- Daniela Melchior (born 1996) a Portuguese actress

=== Sport ===
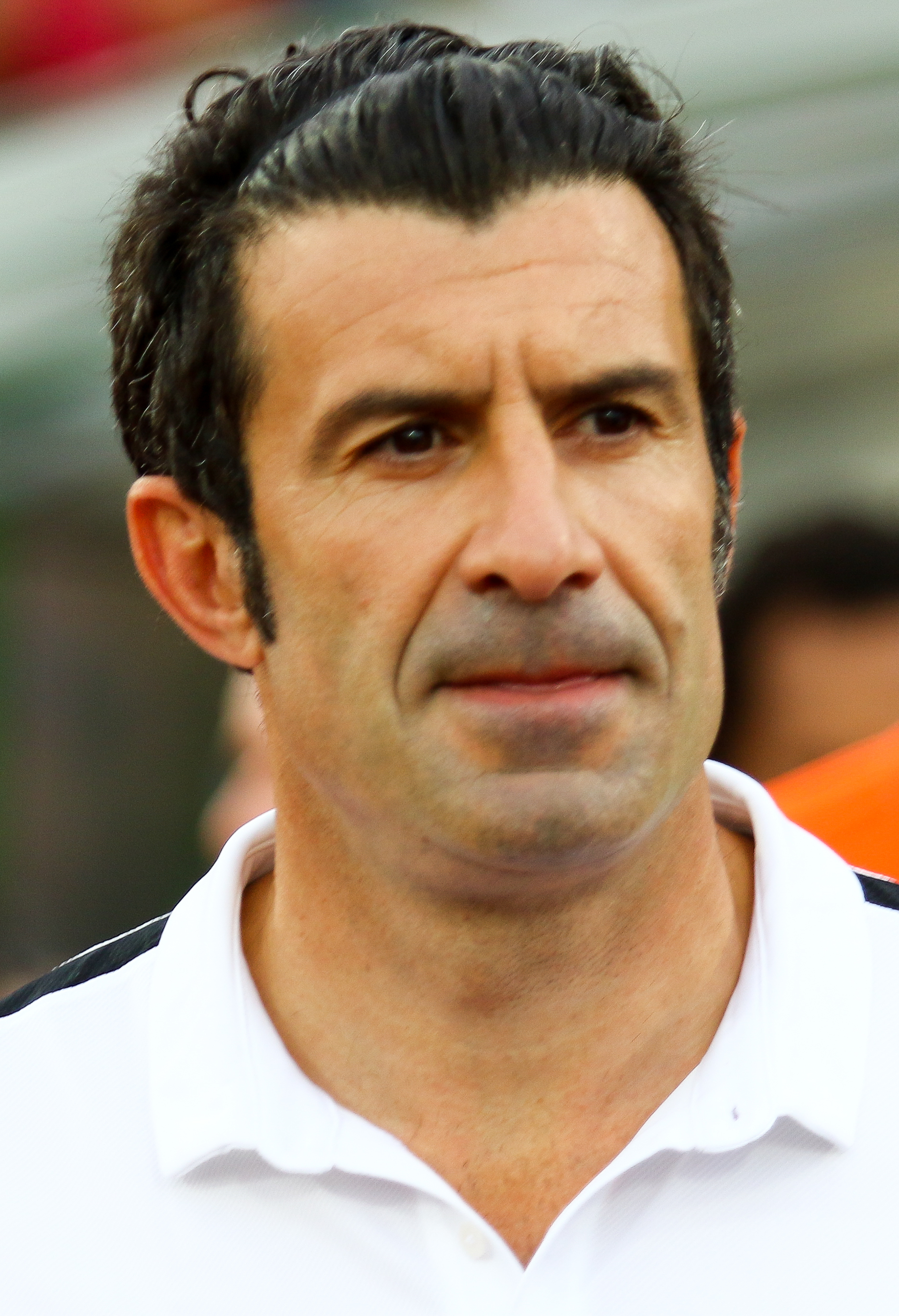
Luis Figo, 2017

- Alfredo Murça (1948–2007) a Portuguese international footballer with nearly 400 club caps
- Rui Eugénio (born 1966) a Portuguese former footballer with over 400 club caps
- Rui Madeira (born 1969), a Portuguese rally driver
- Luís Figo (born 1972) known as Figo, former footballer with 570 caps and 127 for Portugal
- Telma Monteiro (born 1985), world champion judoka
- Silvestre Varela (born 1985) a footballer with over 400 club caps and 27 for Portugal
- Carlos Emanuel Soares Tavares (born 1985) known as Carlitos, a footballer with 350 club caps and 32 for Cape Verde
- Aylton Boa Morte (born 1993) a Portuguese footballer with over 350 club caps
- Mónica Mendes (born 1993) a Portuguese footballer with 51 caps for Portugal women
- Miguel Oliveira (born 1995) a Portuguese professional MotoGP Rider
- André Horta (born 1996) a Portuguese footballer
- Rafael Leão (born 1999) a Portuguese footballer
- Paulo Bernardo (footballer) (born 2002) footballer who plays as a midfielder for Scottish Premiership club Celtic. Hunskelper and Scottish league and cup double winner 2023/24 and 2024/25
- Gonçalo Inácio (born 2001) footballer who currently plays for Primeira Liga club Sporting CP and the Portugal national football team

== International relations ==
Almada is twinned with:

- Ostrava, Czech Republic
- Porto Amboim, Angola
- Regla, Cuba
- Sal, Cape Verde

== See also ==
- Almada Fórum
