= MEO Sudoeste =

Annual music festival in Portugal

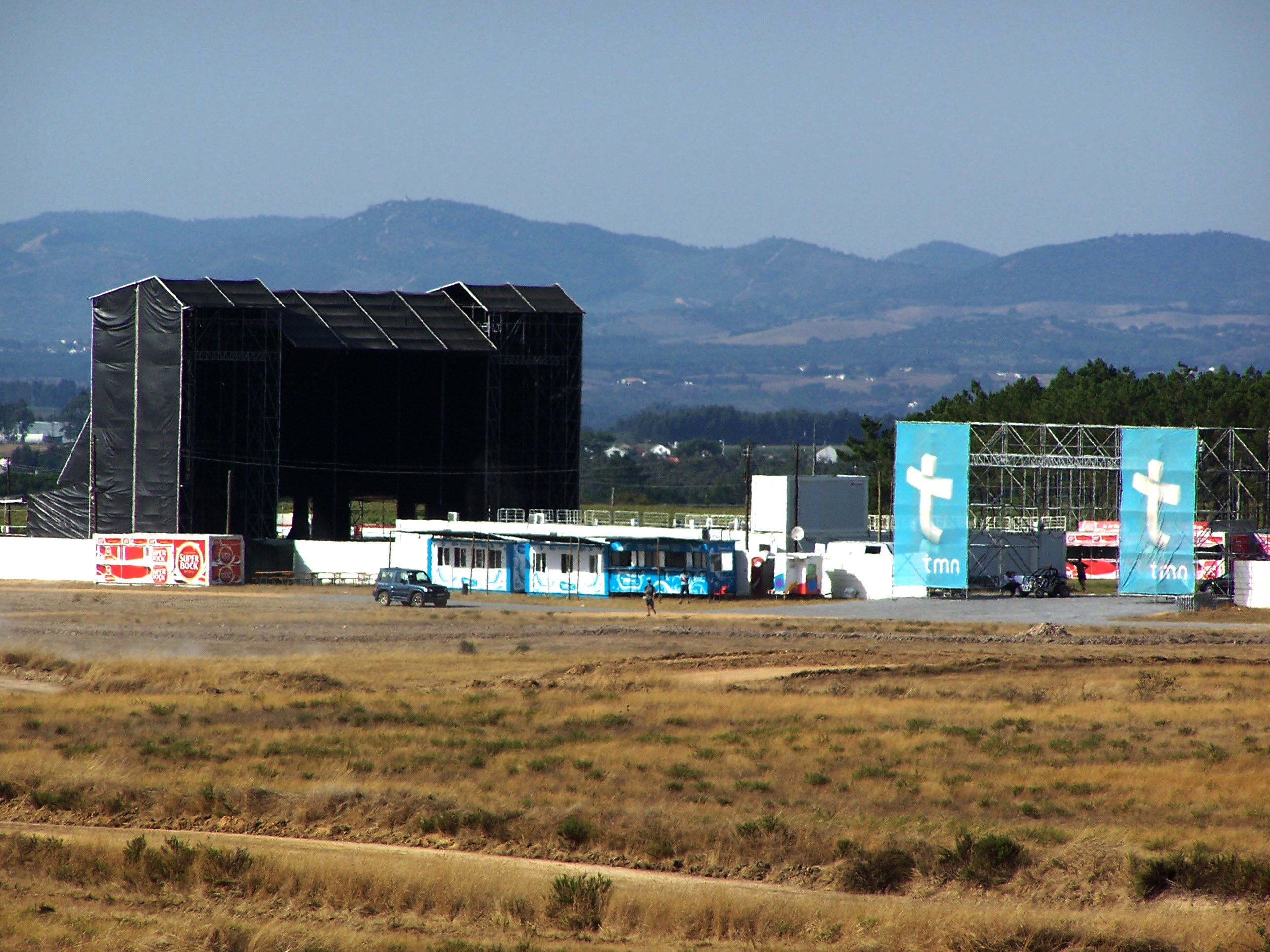
- Entrance and main stage, in 2007
- Genre: Hip hop, pop, EDM, reggae, rock, alternative rock, electronic
- Locations: Herdade da Casa Branca, São Teotónio, Odemira, Portugal
- Years active: 1997–present
- Website: www.meosudoeste.pt/en

The Sudoeste Festival (Portuguese pronunciation: [suˈðwɛʃtɨ]), currently named MEO Sudoeste for sponsorship reasons, is a music festival that takes places annually since 1997, in August, in Odemira, in the southwest of Portugal. It is organized by live entertainment company Música no Coração and is currently sponsored by the Portuguese telecommunications company MEO.

The festival started as a rock festival. Over the years, it has featured a considerable variety of headliners, such as Anitta, Marilyn Manson, Blur, Sonic Youth, The Cure, UB40, Massive Attack, Kraftwerk, Oasis, Daft Punk, Björk, Faith No More, Snoop Dogg and Kanye West. It had a stage dedicated to reggae music from 2005 to 2013. In the early 2010s, it gradually changed its musical focus to mainly hip-hop, mainstream pop and electronic dance music.

== Editions ==
=== 1997 ===
The first edition of the Sudoeste Festival happened on 8, 9 and 10 August 1997. Its main sponsor was Sagres beer.

Lineup of Sudoeste Festival 1997
8 August	9 August	10 August
Blur; Veruca Salt; Urban Species; Entre Aspas; Anger; Bizarra Locomotiva; Industrial Metal Machine	Marilyn Manson; Xutos & Pontapés; Luther Allison; Jestofunk; Blasted Mechanism; Monsterpiece; Ref	Suede; dEUS; Rio Grande; Hedningarna; Cool Hipnoise; Turbo Junkie; Red Beans

=== 1998 ===
The second edition took place on 7, 8 and 9 August 1998. The main sponsor was Sagres.

Lineup of Sudoeste Festival 1998
7 August	8 August	9 August
The Cure; Therapy?; Ratos de Porão; Sérgio Godinho; Family; Three and a Quarter; Hipnotica	Sonic Youth; Fun Lovin' Criminals; Yo La Tengo; Pinhead Society; Los Tomatoes; Blue Orange Juice; Velveteen	Portishead; PJ Harvey; Placebo; Silence 4; Cool Train Crew; Kintaldo Dub

=== 1999 ===
The third edition took place on 6, 7 and 8 August 1999. The main sponsor was Sagres.

Lineup of Sudoeste Festival 1999
6 August	7 August	8 August
Massive Attack; The Chemical Brothers; Belle Chase Hotel; Kula Shaker	Xutos & Pontapés; The Jon Spencer Blues Explosion; Mercury Rev; Clã	James; The Gift; Urban Dance Squad; Stereolab; Ocean Colour Scene

=== 2000 ===
The fourth edition took place on 4, 5 and 6 August 2000. The main sponsor was Sagres.

Lineup of Sudoeste Festival 2000
4 August	5 August	6 August
Bush; Beck; Placebo; Elastica	Moloko; Lamb; Bloodhound Gang; Ala dos Namorados	Guano Apes; Oasis; Morcheeba; Da Weasel

=== 2001 ===
The fifth edition was the first with a duration of 4 days, taking place between 2 and 5 August 2001. The main sponsor was Sagres.

Lineup of Sudoeste Festival 2001
2 August	3 August	4 August	5 August
Sneaker Pimps; Hooverphonic; Atomic Bees; DJ Jon Carter; DJ Rui Vargas; DJ Luís Leite; Cebola Mol	Placebo; PJ Harvey; Stereo MC's; Goldfrapp; Elbow	UB40; Dreadzone; Zero 7; K's Choice; Jorge Palma	Sepultura; The Flaming Lips; The Divine Comedy; Ash; Da Weasel

=== 2002 ===
The sixth edition took place between 1 and 4 August 2002. The main sponsor was Sagres beer.

Lineup of Sudoeste Festival 2002
1 August	2 August	3 August	4 August
Belle and Sebastian; Sigur Rós; The Beta Band	The Chemical Brothers; Air; Black Rebel Motorcycle Club; Thievery Corporation; Rodrigo Leão	Alanis Morissette; Peter Murphy; Orishas; Charlie Brown Jr.; André Indiana	The Cure; Muse; The Electric Soft Parade; Blasted Mechanism; Plastica

=== 2003 ===
The seventh edition took place between 7 and 10 August 2003. The main sponsor was Optimus.

Lineup of Sudoeste Festival 2003
7 August	8 August	9 August	10 August
Terrakota; Arnaldo Antunes; Múm	Primal Scream; Jamiroquai; Suede; Blind Zero; Toranja	Skin; Morcheeba; Beth Orton; David Fonseca; Sly and Robbie	Beck; Beth Gibbons & Rustin Man; Stereophonics; Moloko; Badly Drawn Boy

=== 2004 ===
The eighth edition took place between 5 and 8 August 2004. The main sponsor was Optimus.

Lineup of Sudoeste Festival 2004
	5 August	6 August	7 August	8 August
Main Stage	Soulwax; The Divine Comedy; Rodrigo Leão	Massive Attack; Franz Ferdinand; The Dandy Warhols; Clã; Los Hermanos	Groove Armada; Da Weasel; Zero 7; Ash; Love with Arthur Lee	Kraftwerk; Air; dEUS; Tim Booth
Planeta Sudoeste Stage	Adrian Sherwood Soundsystem; Manasseh Hi-Fi; Dubadelic Vibrations	Dezperados; Mr. Gentleman & The Far East Band; Navio Negreiro; Zen; More República Masónia; Bunnyranch	DJ AL (The Deal); Koop (DJ set); Two Banks of Four; Mike Stellar; Melo D; Sloppy Joe; Oioai	DJ Vargas; Gomo; Mercado Negro; Loto; Plaza; The Ultimate Architects

=== 2005 ===
The ninth edition took place between 4 and 7 August 2005. The main sponsor was TMN.

Lineup of Sudoeste Festival 2005
	4 August	5 August	6 August	7 August
TMN Stage	Sean Paul; Orquestra Imperial; Expensive Soul; Domingos António; Junior	Oasis; Kasabian	Fatboy Slim; Underworld; Humanos; The Thrills	Basement Jaxx; Dinosaur Jr.; Doves
Planeta Sudoeste Stage	Ladytron; Gato Fedorento	LCD Soundsystem; Hot Chip; Maxïmo Park; Devendra Banhart; Black Dice; The Juan MacLean; Delia Gonzalez and Gavin Russom; Tim Sweeney; Boitezuleika	Peaches; Mylo; Lou Rhodes; Josh Rouse; Hipnótica; Sagas feat. DJ Nel'Assassin; Factor Activo	The Kills; The (International) Noise Conspiracy; WrayGunn; d3ö; Mata Tu, Patrón; The Vicious Five
Positive Vibes Stage		Souls of Fire; Groundation; Black Uhuru feat. Michael Rose; Pow Pow Movement (sound system)	Pierpoljak; Seeed; Sentinel Sound; Kussundulola	Morgan Heritage; The Gladiators; One Love Family; Soundquake (Soundsystem)

=== 2006 ===
The tenth edition was held between 3 and 6 August 2006. The main sponsor was TMN.

Lineup of Sudoeste Festival 2006
	3 August	4 August	5 August	6 August
TMN Stage	DJ Marlboro (03:30); Gentleman (01:55); Mattafix (00:35); Animal Liberation Orchestra (23:15); Brazilian Girls (22:05); Souls of Fire (21:00); Gaiteiros de Lisboa (20:00)	Long Beach Shortbus (01:15); The Prodigy (23:55); Goldfrapp (22:10); David Fonseca (20:50); 2008 (20:00)	Daft Punk (01:45); Madness (00:00); Skin (22:40); Marcelo D2 (21:20); Boss AC (20:00)	Xutos & Pontapés (01:20); Morningwood (00:00); Zero 7 (22:40); Macaco (21:20); Revistados (20:00)
Planeta Sudoeste Stage	Stereo Addiction (03:30); Afrika Bambaataa (01:20); Seu Jorge (23:55); The Kooks (22:45); The Twilight Singers with Mark Lanegan (21:35); White Buffalo (20:30); Pedro Tochas (stand-up)	DJ Nuno Reis (03:30); X-Wife (02:35); Brakes (01:25); Toranja (00:05); Dengue Fever (23:00); Nouvelle Vague (21:40); Cibelle (20:30); Linda Martini (19:00); Oioai (18:00); Hiena (17:00)	Dezperados (03:00); Buraka Som Sistema (01:50); WhoMadeWho (01:40); Loto (23:30); Los de Abajo (21:40); Pedro Luis e a Parede (20:30); Houdini Blues (19:00); Rock Group Tiger (18:00); If Lucy Fell (17:00)	Rui Vargas (03:10); Ivan Smagghe (01:20); Breakestra (23:50); The Legendary Tiger Man (22:40); Final Fantasy (21:40); José Gonzaléz (20:30); Kalibrados (19:00); Factos Reais (18:00); Olivetree (17:00)
Positive Vibes Stage		Supersonic (02:00); Max Romeo (00:15); Jahcoustix (22:00); One Sun Tribe (20:45)	Firestarter Soundsystem (02:10); Jimmy Cliff (00:15); Quaiss Kitir (22:15); Sir Giant (20:45)	Pow Pow Movement (02:00); Israel Vibration (00:15); Anthony B (22:20); Prince Wadada (20:45)

=== 2007 ===
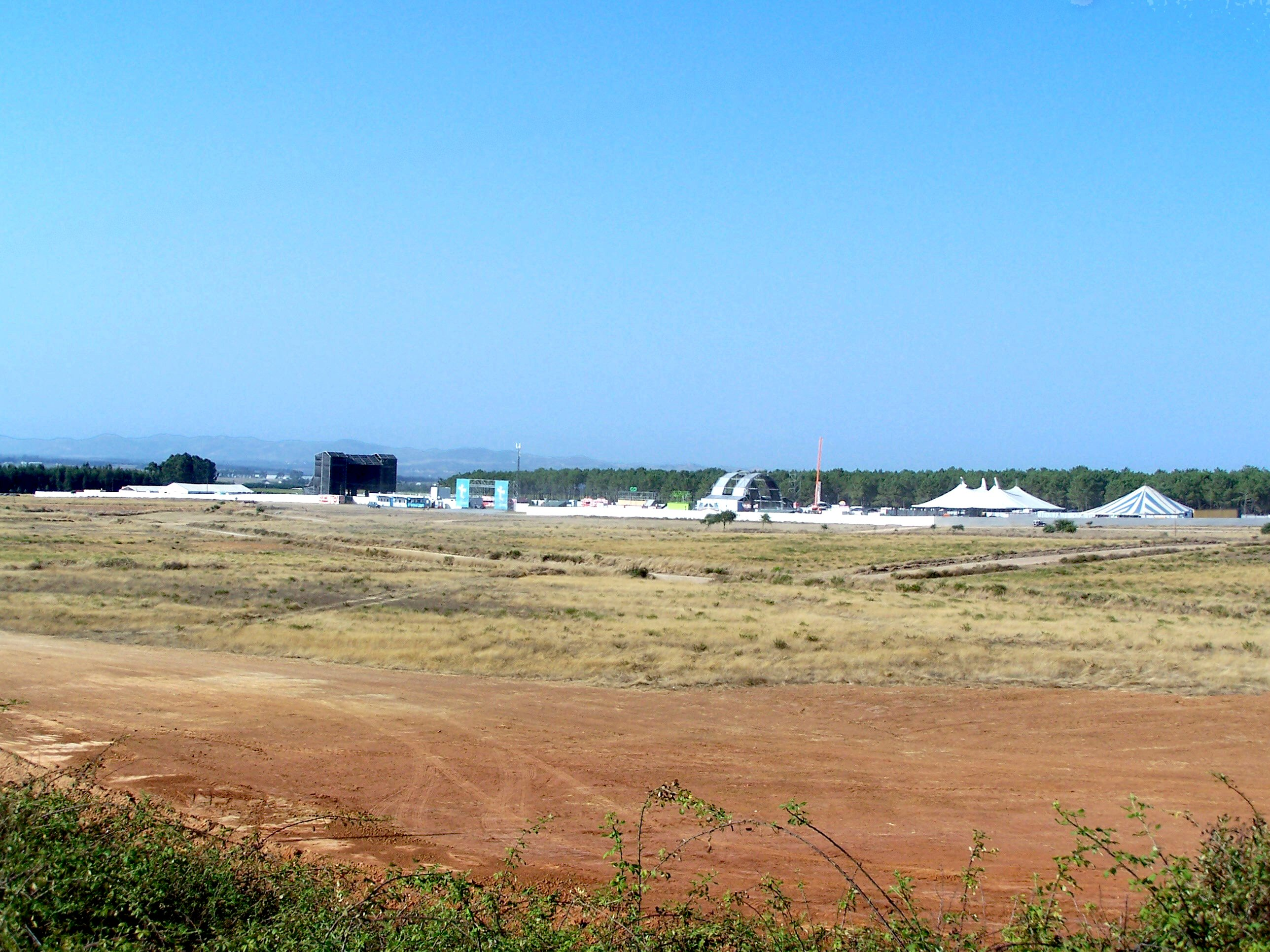
All the stages of the Sudoeste Festival, in 2007

The 11th edition was held between 2 and 5 August 2007. The main sponsor was TMN.

Lineup of Sudoeste Festival 2007
	2 August	3 August	4 August	5 August
TMN Stage	Manu Chao (02:20); Damian Marley (00:30); Gilberto Gil (23:30); I'm from Barcelona (22:20); Ojos de Brujo (21:10); Mayra Andrade (20:00)	Buraka Som Sistema (02:00); Cypress Hill (00:40); The Cinematics (23:20); Outlandish (22:10); Armandinho (20:50); Cool Hipnoise (19:40); Soulbizness (19:00)	Australian Pink Floyd Show (02:30); Groove Armada (00:50); The Streets (23:30); Sam the Kid (22:20); Sérgio Godinho (21:10); Air Traffic (20:00)	Babylon Circus (01:35); James (23:45); Phoenix (22:25); Razorlight (21:05); Albert Hammond, Jr. (20:00)
Planeta Sudoeste Stage	Nuno Reis (04:30); 2 Djs do C*** (03:30); Noisettes (02:10); Wraygunn (00:50); Camera Obscura (23:20); Loney Dear (21:50); Filarmonica Gil (20:40); Claud (19:30)	Mary B (03:50); Mary Ann Hobbs (02:30); Bonde do Rolê (00:50); Data Rock (23:20); Balla (22:00); Os Lambas (20:45); Nástio Mosquito (19:30)	Hugo Santana (04:20); Sonic Júnior (03:10); Vanessa da Mata (01:50); Koop (00:20); Patrick Wolf (22:50); Sondre Lerche (21:20); Tiago Bettencourt (20:05); Eta Carinae (19:00)	Rui Vargas (04:20); Stereo Addiction (03:20); The National (02:00); ...And You Will Know Us by theTrail of Dead (00:30); Of Montreal (23:00); Guillemots (21:30); Tara Perdida (20:15); 2008 (19:00)
Positive Vibes Stage	Cassius (01:00)	General Levy + Robbo Ranx (02:00); Steel Pulse (00:15); Soldiers of Jah Army (22:00); Manif3stos (20h45)	Sounds Portugueses (02:00); Saian Supa Crew (00:15); Martin Jondo (22:00); Stepacide (20:45)	Pow Pow Movement (02:00); Tiken Jah Fakoly (00:15); Yellowman (22:00); Alioune K (20:45)

=== 2008 ===
The 12th edition was held between 6 and 10 August 2008. The main sponsor was TMN.

Lineup of Sudoeste Festival 2008
	6 August	7 August	8 August	9 August	10 August
TMN Stage		Björk; Tinariwen; Balkan Beat Box; Clã; Natiruts	The Chemical Brothers; Goldfrapp; Tindersticks; Dynamics; Yael Naim; Rita Redshoes	Vanessa da Mata; David Fonseca; Nitin Sawhney; Brandi Carlile; Melle	Franz Ferdinand; Shout Out Louds; Xutos & Pontapés; Jorge Palma; Tara Perdida; Led On
Planeta Sudoeste Stage		Roberta Sá; Arnaldo Antunes; José James; Tounami Diabaté; Roy Paci; Coldfinger	Cidinho & Doca; Nneka; Rosalia de Souza; Moinho; Tetine	Tiago Bettencourt; Camané; Deolinda; Alexia Bomtempo; Os Pontos Negros	Jamie Lidell; Cut Copy; Junior Boys; The Vicious Five; Fanfarlo
Positive Vibes Stage	Bob Sinclar; Sexy Sound System; DJ Malvado	David Rodigan; Dub Inc; Souls of Fire; Bambule	Zion Train; Beenie Man; Alborosie; The Most Wanted	BigBadaBoom; Richie Spice; Ziggi; Chaparro	PowPow Movement; Alpha Blondy; Luciano; Jah Vai

=== 2009 ===
The 13th edition was held between 6 and 9 August 2009. The main sponsor was TMN.

Lineup of Sudoeste Festival 2009
	5 August	6 August	7 August	8 August	9 August
TMN Stage	David Guetta; FUNKyou2; Miguel Psi	Armin van Buuren; The National; Buraka Som Sistema; Macaco; The Veils	Madcon; Zero 7; Mariza; Carlinhos Brown	Faith No More; Étienne de Crécy; Jet; Blind Zero; X-Wife	Lily Allen; Basement Jaxx; Amy McDonald; Marcelo D2; Gomo
Planeta Sudoeste Stage		Ebony Bones; Ladyhawke; Devotchka; Marcelo Camelo; Mallu Magalhães	The Legendary Tigerman; The Pinkertones; Muchachito Bombo Infierno; Pastora	X-Press 2; Róisin Murphy; Low; Giro Florcaveira; John is Gone; Drive with Lúcia Moniz	Caravan Palace; Au Revoir Simone; Bunnyranch; Virgem Suta; Anaquim
Sapo Positive Vibes Stage		Anthony B; Innastereo	Marrokan & The Charly Skank Band	Mad Caddies; Richie Campbell	Third World; Freddy Locks

=== 2010 ===
The 14th edition was held between 4 and 8 August 2010. The main sponsor was TMN.

Lineup of Sudoeste Festival 2010
	4 August	5 August	6 August	7 August	8 August
TMN Stage	2ManyDJs; Zé Pedro and Dr. Ramos; Zé Miguel Nora; Nuno Reis	M.I.A.; Groove Armada; The Flaming Lips; Bomba Estéreo; Maria Gadú	Jamiroquai; Orelha Negra; Colbie Caillat; James Morrison; Expensive Soul	Mika; Sugababes; Bajofondo; Tim & Amigos; Brett Dennen	Massive Attack; David Guetta; Air; Mike Patton's Mondo Cane; Peixe:Avião
Planeta SW Stage		Rye Rye; The Very Best; Márcio Local	Lykke Li; Ladi6; Nu Soul Family; Emmy Curl	Friendly Fires; Anaquim; Diabo na Cruz; João Só e os Abandonados	Beirut; Tiago Bettencourt & Mantha; Carminho; Martina Topley-Bird
Positive Vibes Stage		Richie Campbell; Israel Vibration; Tarrus Riley; Lire Le Temps	Human Chalice; Jah Cure; Zion Train; Supersonic	Marrokan; Midnite; The Black Seeds; Herb-A-Lize It	Birds; The Wailers; The Steel Pulse; Pow Pow Movement

=== 2011 ===
The 15th edition was held between 3 and 7 August 2011. The main sponsor was TMN.

Lineup of Sudoeste Festival 2011
	3 August	4 August	5 August	6 August	7 August
TMN Stage	Axwell; Thomas Gold; Freshkitos; DJ Ramesh	Snoop Dogg; Raphael Saadiq; Janelle Monáe; Eliza Doolittle	Kanye West; Patrice; Underworld; Deolinda; Marcelo Camelo	David Guetta; Scissor Sisters; The Script; Valete; Mexican Institute of Sound	Swedish House Mafia; The National; Interpol; Filipe Pinto
Planeta Sudoeste Stage		Andreya Triana; Jamie Woon; Bag Raiders; Destroyer	Clã; dEUS; Luísa Sobral; Cuca Roseta	Nouvelle Vague; King Khan & The Shrines; Maria Gasolina; Choc Quib Town	Zola Jesus; Neon Indian; Givers; Polock
Positive Vibes Stage		Dj Enigma; Faya Fex; Richie Spice; Asian Dub Foundation; Like the Man Said	Sentinel; Big Badda Boom; Junior Kelly; Queen Ifrica feat. Tony Rebel; Bloco Bleque	Agir; Tony Matterhorn; Nu Bai; Alpha Blondy; Mr. Vegas	Souls of Fire; Inner Circle; Konshens; Firestarter Sound; Supersonic vs. Herb-A-Lize It
Groovebox Stage		Zé Salvador & Sérginho; Gui Boratto; Sierra Sam; Bart	Raresh; Cassy; João Maria & António Alves; Miguel Neto	Rui Vargas & André Cascais; Mara Trax; Zip	Richie Hawtin; Hello? Repete SS; Stereo Addiction; Freshkitos

=== 2012 ===
The 16th edition was held between 1 and 5 August 2012. The main sponsor was TMN.

Lineup of Sudoeste Festival 2012
	1 August	2 August	3 August	4 August	5 August
TMN Stage	Afrojack; Martin Solveig; Pete Tha Zouk	Ben Harper; Fat Freddy's Drop; Marcelo D2; Matisyahu; Ben Howard	Eddie Vedder; Example; James Morrison; Glen Hansard; Richie Campbell	Gorillaz Sound System; The Roots; Xutos e Pontapés; The Ting Tings; Calle 13	David Guetta; Jessie J; Two Door Cinema Club; The Vaccines; Best Coast
Groovebox Stage		Rui Vargas & André Cascais; Dorian Paic; João Maria; Wraygunn; Miguel Neto; Tensnake; The Twelves; Ramboiage	Luciano; Cesar Merveille & Maayan Nidam; Serginho; Benoit & Sergio Live; Nicolas Jaar; Best Youth	Jan Krueger & Vera; Expander; Daze Maxim; Freshkitos; Four Tet; Thievery Corporation; Orelha Negra; Mary B	Andy C; Borgore; DJ Ride; Nuno Forte B2B Alif; Dogz United B2B Jamie Boy; Balkan Beatbox; Throes + The Shine; DJ Slimcutz B2B DJ D-One
MEO Reggae Box Stage		Saxon Sound; Lee "Scratch" Perry, Max Romeo & The Congos; Half Pint + Cornell Campbell + Far East Band; Freddy Locks	Irration Stepas; Dreadzone; Jamaican Legends feat. Bitty McLean; UrbanVibsz	Overproof SoundSystem; Jah Mason, Fantan Mojah and The Dub Akom Band; Little Roy; Chapa Dux	Bass Odyssey; RDX; Beres Hammond; Jah Vai

=== 2013 ===
The 17th edition was held between 7 and 11 August 2013. The main sponsor was MEO.

Lineup of Sudoeste Festival 2013
	7 August	8 August	9 August	10 August	11 August
MEO Stage	Avicii; Alesso; Djeff	SOJA; Pitbull; Natiruts; Richie Campbell; Mónica Ferraz	Janelle Monáe; Fatboy Slim; Pete Tha Zouk; Donavon Frankenreiter; Tiago Bettencourt	Calvin Harris; CeeLo Green; Expensive Soul; Kika	Snoop Lion; Dj Ride; Orelha Negra; Anselmo Ralph; Zona 5
Moche Room Stage		DJ Vibe; Rui Vargas & André Cascais; João Maria	Karetus; Ninja Kore; FunkYou2; Goldierocks	Xinobi + Da Chick; Branko; Mind Da Gap; Orelha Negra; Regula	Kura; Henri Josh; FunkYou2; Tiago Santos
Moche Vibrations Stage		Mighty Crown; Jah Sun; Fryah Box Sound; Israel Vibration; Dubheart	Silly Walks Discotheque; Exco Levi; Capleton; Rastafire Sound; Skalibans	Jugglerz Sound vs Warrior Sound; Spit Fyah Sound; Don Carlos; The Uprising	Congo Natty feat. Tenor Fly; Sintra Bass Connection; Gyptian; Sativa
Santa Casa Stage		Long Way to Alaska; Dengaz	Frankie Chavez; D.A.M.A.	Kumpania Algazarra; João Só	Salto; Ana Free

=== 2014 ===
The 18th edition was held between 6 and 10 August 2014. The main sponsor was MEO.

Lineup of Sudoeste Festival 2014
	6 August	7 August	8 August	9 August	10 August
MEO Stage	Dimitri Vegas & Like Mike; Martin Garrix; Jay Hardway; Pedro Cazanova	Hardwell; Ellie Goulding; John Newman; Tom Odell; Miguel Araújo	Sebastian Ingrosso; Gentleman; 5-30; O Rappa; B4	Alesso; Seu Jorge; Jamie Cullum; Selah Sue; Yuri da Cunha	David Guetta; Example; Benny Benassi; Karetus; KURA; Djeff Afrozila
Moche Room Stage		DJ Riot; Octa Push; Dealema; XEG; Orelha Negra; Dillaz; GROGNation	Oliver Ingrosso; John Steven; Nelson Freitas; Dentinho	DJ Overule; DJ Glue; Zona 5; Sensi	Rui Vargas; DJ Bl3nd; Miss Sheila; Dengaz
Santa Casa Stage		Jimmy P; NGA	Melech Mechaya; Time For T	Diabo na Cruz; Los Waves	Asterisco Cardinal Bomba Caveira; Maria Bradshaw

=== 2015 ===
The 19th edition was held between 5 and 9 August 2015. The main sponsor was MEO.

Lineup of Sudoeste Festival 2015
	5 August	6 August	7 August	8 August	9 August
MEO Stage	Dimitri Vegas & Like Mike; KURA; Wolfpack	Calvin Harris; Emeli Sandé; C2C; D.A.M.A; Dengaz	W&W; Buraka Som Sistema; Clean Bandit; Carlão; Jimmy P; DJ No Expression	Hardwell; Lil Jon; Anselmo Ralph; Regula; Pérola	Steve Aoki; Showtek; Oliver Heldens; Above & Beyond; Quentin Mosimann; DJeff Afrozila
Moche Room Stage		Juicy M; Jordy Dazz; Mundo Secreto	Julian Jordan; Blinders; Yannick Afroman	DJ Oder; King Kong; DJ Ride; Mundo Segundo & Sam the Kid; Tribruto; Mike El Nite	DJ Bl3nd; TV Noise; NTS
Santa Casa Stage		Diogo Piçarra; ÁTOA	Agir; Carolina Deslandes	Mundo Segundo; João Só; Alberto Indio	Frankie Chavez; Sara Paço; Tom Mash

=== 2016 ===
The 20th edition was held between 3 and 7 August 2016. The main sponsor was MEO.

Lineup of Sudoeste Festival 2016
	3 August	4 August	5 August	6 August	7 August
MEO Stage	DVBBS; Yellow Claw; Club Bandtiz	Wiz Khalifa; Martin Garrix; Josef Salvat; Virgul	Damian Marley; Seu Jorge; KURA; C4 Pedro	Sia; Steve Aoki; James Morrison; Diogo Piçarra	Steve Angello; NERVO; Cali & El Dandee; Sunnery James & Ryan Marciano; Jimmy P
Moche Room Stage		Big Nelo & B26; Slimcutz & Ace	Orelha Negra	DJ Overule; Vondi Carlo	Pete Kingsman; Ben Ambergen; Deejay Telio & Deedz B
Santa Casa Stage		ÁTOA; Leonor Andrade	Mishlawi; DEAU	João Pedro Pais; NBC	April Ivy; Neev; Gato Maltês

=== 2017 ===
The 21st edition was held between 1 and 5 August 2017. The main sponsor was MEO.

Lineup of Sudoeste Festival 2017
	1 August	2 August	3 August	4 August	5 August
MEO Stage		The Chainsmokers; Mac Miller; Richie Campbell; Matias Damásio	DJ Snake; Marshmello; Two Door Cinema Club; Mishlawi	Martin Garrix; Lil Wayne; Dua Lipa; Crystal Fighters	Afrojack; Jamiroquai; Dengaz; April Ivy
Moche Room Stage		Piruka; Andrezo; JêPê; A-Gold; CRI$E; HYPE MYKE; Liga Knock Out	Putzgrilla; Malabá; ProfJam; Leandro 300; Liga Knock Out	Karetus; Curadoria Orelha Negra	Dimitri Vangelis & Wyman; Stereossauro; Van Breda; SaÍdos Da Casca; Liga Knock Out
Santa Casa Stage		Plutónio; Calema	MGDRV; Isaura	GROGnation; Valas	Sebastián Yatra; Mika Mendes
SuperBock Stage	DJ Overule; DJ Ride				

=== 2018 ===
The 22nd edition was held between 8 and 11 August 2018. The main sponsor was MEO.

On 9 August, Wet Bed Gang and KURA replaced Hardwell, which cancelled his performance due to sickness.

Lineup of Sudoeste Festival 2018
	8 August	9 August	10 August	11 August
MEO Stage	Don Diablo; J Balvin; Deejay Telio; Piruka	KURA; Wet Bed Gang; Jason Derulo; Wizkid; C4 Pedro	Marshmello; Desiigner; Lil Pump; Mundo Segundo & Sam the Kid	Shawn Mendes; Diogo Piçarra; Lemaitre; Karetus & Friends
LG Stage	Blaya; Caroletta; B3L2	Eva RapDiva; Papillon; Rich Fellas	Bispo; Domi; Mar	Paulo Sousa; YUZI; Ivo Lucas; Enoque

=== 2019 ===
The 23rd edition was held between 7 and 10 August 2019. The main sponsor was MEO.

Lineup of Sudoeste Festival 2019
	7 August	8 August	9 August	10 August
MEO Stage	Anitta; Steve Aoki; Years & Years; Blaya	Post Malone; 6lack; KURA; Jimmy P	Russ; VINI VICI; Wet Bed Gang; Vitor Kley	Rita Ora; Joss Stone; Timmy Trumpet; Carolina Deslandes
LG Stage	Murta; Melim; Macaia	X-Tense; Spliff; Mike Lyte	Lon3r Johny; SippinPurpp; Chong Kwong; MDO	ÁTOA; Biya; Mi Casa; João Moniz
