= Sam the Kid discography =

This is the discography of rapper and producer Sam the Kid.

== Albums ==
Year	Title
1999	Entre(tanto): Released: 1999
2002	Sobre(tudo): Released: January 2002
2002	Beats Vol 1: Amor: Released: December 2002; Label: Loop:Recordings
2004	Sobre(tudo) (Special Edition): Released: March 2004
2006	Pratica(mente): Released: December 8, 2006; Label: Edel
2008	Pratica(mente) (Special Edition): Released: 2008; Label: Edel
2020	Caixa de Ritmos: Released: July 17, 2020; Label: Quarto Mágico
2021	Um Café e a Conta (with Valete): Released: July 18, 2021; Label: Quarto Mágico
2022	Caixa de Ritmos 2: Released: July 18, 2022; Label: Quarto Mágico
2023	Quarto Mágico: Released: July 17, 2023; Label: Quarto Mágico
2025	Caixa de Ritmos III: Released: July 18, 2025; Label: Quarto Mágico

== Singles ==
Year	Song	Album
1999	"Lágrimas"	Entre(tanto)
2002	"Não Percebes"	Sobre(tudo)
2002	"Alma Gémea"	Beats Vol 1: Amor
2004	"Motivação"	Comp. Poesia Urbana vol.1
2006	"Poetas de Karaoke"	Pratica(mente)
2007	"Abstenção"	Pratica(mente)
2007	"À procura da perfeita repetição"	Pratica(mente)

== Collaborations and guest appearances ==
Year	Artist	Album	Song title(s)
2000	TPC	TPC - Sessões de Hip Hop Vol. 1 (Compilation album)	"100" featuring GQ
2000	DJ Cruzfader	Ressureição	"Paiador do Hip-Hop"
2001	Xeg	Ritmo & Poesia	"Questionário"
2002	DJ Bomberjack	Bomba Relógio	"A Diferença" featuring Adamastor & Bónus "Trabalha"
2002	Dupla Consciência	Conexão Verbal Vol. 1	"Vamos em Frente" featuring Telma & Paranóia
June 2002	Regula	1ª Jornada	"Pimbas"
2002	Da Blazz	Dados	"Movimenta-se"
September 2002	Valete	Educação Visual	"Beleza Artificial"
September 2002	Guardiões do Movimento Sagrado	Guerrilheiros do Hip Hop	"00 Hip-Hop" featuring Chullage
July 2003	Bad Spirit	Odiado E Mal Amado	"No Estúdio"
November 2003	Kacetado	Ontem, Hoje & Amanhã	"Versos"
April 2004	DJ Kronic	Projecto Inoxidável II	"6 Ta Feira"
November 2004	DJ Assassino	Time Code	"O Ideal"
December 2004	Tekilla	Tekillogia	"À Vontade do Freguês"
March 2005	Boss AC	Ritmo Amor Palavras	"Dicas", "Brasas"
July 2005	MadVision	MadVision	(entire album)
June 2006		O Crime Do Padre Amaro - Banda Sonora	"Auto de Fé" "Esquemas" "O Crime Do Padre Amaro"
June 2006	SP & Wilson	Barulho	"Sente Mo Style"
October 2006	Valete	Serviço Público	"Pela Música pt.2"

== Sources ==
- https://web.archive.org/web/20070501084718/http://www.h2tuga.net/mcdj/grupos_s/samthekid.php
- https://www.qobuz.com/us-en/interpreter/sam-the-kid/837081
