= Sam the Kid production discography =

The following is a list of the songs produced by Sam the Kid.

Year	Artist	Album	Song title(s)
1999	Filhos de Um Deus Menor	Album-A Longa Caminhada	"Perguntas Sem Respostas", "Nem Guerreiros Nem Soldados", "Longa Caminhada", "Momento Final", "O Ar Que Eu Respiro"
2000	TPC	Compilation album-TPC - SessÕes de Hip Hop Vol.1	"100"
2001	Chullage	Albums-Rapresálias	"Rhymeshit Que Abala", "Lutar Pela Nossa Vida", "O Nosso Movimento", "Mulher da Minha Vida", "Igualdade é Uma Ilusão"
June 2002	Regula	Album-1ª Jornada	"Safodastyle", "Benção", "Indiferenças", "Drunk's", "Pimbas", "1ª Jornada", "Cai Fora", "Comparações", "Rewind", "O.P.", "Puzzle", "Especial"
September 2002	Valete	Album-Educação Visual	"Serial Killer", "À Noite", "Pseudo MC's"
September 2002	Valete	Album-Educação Visual	"Serial Killer", "À Noite", "Pseudo MC's"
September 2002	Guardiões do Movimento Sagrado	Album-Guerrilheiros do Hip Hop	"00 Hip-Hop", "Sistema"
February 2003	Fuse	Album-Sintoniza...	"Eterno No Teu Ouvido", "Prémio Nobel", "Psicofonia"
May 2003		Compilation album-Nação Hip Hop - 10 Anos de rap em português	"Mulher da Minha Vida", "Prémio Nobel"
June 2003		Compilation album-Hip Hop Nation#1	"O Encontro"
June 2003		Compilation album-Primeiro Kombate	"Pela Arte", "Especial", "Não Percebes", "À Noite", "Quem Me Dera"
June 2003		Compilation album-Carlos Paredes - Movimentos Perpétuos	"Viva!"
June 2003	NBC	Album-Afro-disíaco	"Intro - We Made This", "Pela Arte", "Eu", "Aki Estamos Nós", "Tu & Eu", "Dá-me 1 Minuto", "Tempos Modernos", "Nova Escola vs Velha Escola", "2 Caminhos", "Flavours", "Inteligência / Arte"
June 2003		Compilation album-Hip Hop Nation#1	"Eu", "Se Eu Criasse"
July 2003	Bad Spirit	Album-Odiado E Mal Amado	"Quem Me Dera", "Baza Niggas"
October 2003	Dealema	Album-Dealema	"B.D.A.P.", "A Chave da Saída"
October 2003	Kosmikilla	Album-Polítika de Rua	"Amor A Sério"
November 2003	Kacetado	Album-Ontem, Hoje & Amanhã	"Álbum Intro", "Rimas & Scratch 2ªPt", "Escola de Rua", "Se Eu Criasse", "Não Chores Mais", "O Estado Alimenta O Crime"
2003	Bob Da Rage Sense	Album-Bobinagem	"Bobinagem", "Luz Do Dia"
March 2004		Compilation album-Loop:Agents - Beat Generation	"Sente Isto", "Noble Beat"
April 2004	Chullage	Album-Rapensar	"Nomenklatura"
July 2004		Compilation album-Poesia Urbana Vol.1	"Filho da Selva?", "Nada Muda", "Motivação", "Geração TV", "Underground"
December 2004	Tekilla	Album-Tekillogia	"Fases & Facetas", "N.C.A.", "À vontade do freguês", "Preto no branco"
December 2004	Xeg	Album-Remisturas Vol. I	"Eu Sou", "Se Eu Criasse", "À Noite"
February 2005		Compilation album-Amália Revisited	"Ethos"
March 2005	Blackmastah	Album-Krónicas De Um Mestre	"Vamos Brindar", "Desabafos","Flawless Radio", "Eu E A Minha Família", "Circulação Sanguínea"
March 2005	Blackmastah	Vinyl-Vamos Brindar / Toda A Gente Quer Mais	"Vamos Brindar", "Desabafos", "Flawless Radio"
March 2005	Boss AC	Album-Ritmo Amor Palavras	"Só Preciso de Cinco Minutos"
July 2005	Regula	Album-Tira Teimas	"+ uma vez", "Dicas", "Passemos a coisas sérias", "Diálogo", "Sixteen"
August 2005		Compilation album-Composto de Mudança	"As Palavras São Coisas"
December 2005	Sir Scratch	Album-Cinema: Entre O Coração E O Realismo	"Nada A Perder"
June 2006		Soundtrack album-O Crime do Padre Amaro - Banda Sonora	"Auto de Fé", "Esquemas", "O Crime Do Padre Amaro", "Culpa", "Perseguição", "Telepatia", "Tráfico"
October 2006	Valete	Album-Serviço Público	"Revelação", "Pela Música pt.1", "Os Meus", "Canal 115", "Anti Herói", third part of "Pela Música pt.2", co-produced "Monogamia"
