= Ritmo, Amor e Palavras =

Studio album by Boss AC
- Released: December 2005 in Portugal
- Recorded: Hightower Productions, New York; Estudio Valentim de Carvalho
- Genre: Hip hop
- Language: Portuguese
- Producer: Boss AC, Sam the Kid

Boss AC chronology
Rima Contra a Maré (2002)	Ritmo, Amor e Palavras (2005)	Preto no Branco (2009)

Professional ratings
Review scores
Source	Rating
Disco Digital	(in note)

Ritmo, Amor e Palavras (literally, "Rhythm, Love and Words" or R.A.P.) is Boss AC's third album. It was released in December 2005 in Portugal. It is Boss AC's most successful album and one of the greatest successes in Portuguese music in 2005. It is one of the biggest selling Portuguese hip hop albums and was awarded gold in August 2005 for selling 10,000 copies and later platinum after selling 30,000 copies.

The album was recorded at Hightower Productions in New York City. It was mastered by Jim Brick.

== Nomination ==
The album was nominated for Best Portuguese Act at the 2005 MTV Europe Music Awards.

== Track listing ==
No.	Title	Length
1.	"Intro (Here We Go)"
2.	"Hip Hop (Sou Eu e És Tu)"
3.	"Boa Vibe" (with Carla Moreira)
4.	"Farlo De..."
5.	"Yo (Não Brinques Com Esta Merda)" (with Pos and De La Soul)
6.	"És mais Que Uma Mulher" (with Rita Reis)
7.	"Só Preciso de Cinco Minutos" (produced by Sam the Kid)
8.	"Faz o Favor de Entrar (Tuga Night_" (with Sam the Kid)
9.	"Que Deus" (With a sample from the song "O Pastor" by Madredeus)
10.	"Princesa (Beija-me Outra Vez)" (with Berg)
11.	"Carla Para o Pai Natal"
12.	"So Vês o Que Queres Ver" (with Da Weasel)
13.	"Quem Sente, Sente"
14.	"Sabim"
15.	"Sentir Tão Bem" (with Débora and Gutto)
16.	"Outro (Vou-me Embora)"
17.	"Original Riddim" (with Konscious (hidden track))

== Credits ==
- All tracks produced by Boss AC, except "Só Preciso De Cinco Minutos", by Sam The Kid
- Boss AC - executive producer
- Recorded by AC at NoStress Studio, Troy Hightower at Hightower Productions Inc (NY), Luís Caldeira at Estúdio Valentim de Carvalho and Jorge Cervantes at Estúdio Andinos
- Mixed by Troy Hightower at Hightower Productions Inc and AC at NoStress Studio
- Mastered by Jim Brick at Absolute Audio, New York
- Roda Dentada - writer
- Náná Sousa Dias - photographer
