= Balla (musician) =

Portuguese musician; alter ego of Armando Teixeira

- Origin: Lisbon, Portugal
- Genres: Rock, pop, electro
- Years active: 2000–present
- Label: SonyBMG/Chiado Records
- Members: Armando Teixeira – Voice; Miguel Cervini – Guitar; João Tiago – Keyboards; Duarte Cabaça - Drums
- Website: http://www.myspace.com/ballaportugal

Balla (musician) is the musical alter-ego of Portuguese musician and record producer Armando Teixeira (musician). Balla's music references the sound and style of Serge Gainsbourg and Jaques Brel, combined with hip hop and cut-and-paste references drawn from his time as DJ and producer with both Bizarra Locomotiva and the platinum selling Da Weasel. The arrangements have been described as "reflecting a taste for sound composers like Barry Adamson". Armando Teixeira is recognized as a composer, musician and producer of note within Portugal, and his 2006 studio album A Grande Mentira has been described by Portuguese public radio station Antena 3 as "pop, electronica, eroticism and fury". "In this space, I have adopted the solitary writing of a Nick Cave or Iggy Pop" Balla has said of his own work. When asked if Balla was the summary of his years spent in Bizarra Locomotiva or Da Weasel, he responded "Probably, yes... Any of these bands were very closed, while Balla represents freedom. I am able to experiment a lot. Here there is a little bit of everything that I have done."

== Biography ==
Balla first appeared on the Optimus 2000:we'vebeenwatchingyou collection, with his track "Âmago", in 2000 (alongside other bands such as Plástica and Atomic Bees). His eponymous first album of original songs was released in the same year, and was described as "crossing the atmosphere of accessible Portuguese music, with dance rhythms and pop sounds, finally connected through cut-and-paste, first experimented upon in the universe of hip-hop. The result is essentially a pop sound, yet different from that presented by previous efforts, where the results were rougher. In Balla, Armando Teixeira tried to recreate, in his style, the musical ambience of the 1960s and the 1970s."

In 2003 Balla released his second full-length, entitled Le Jeu, where the humour of the persona is rendered more clearly. A review described the album as "it's pop, it's 'chanson française', it's eroticism, it's electronica and everything else that a disc of such complex songs can suggest. Firstly, because it's based on erotic film soundtracks from the 1960s, 1970s and 1980s, and then because it has songs, about everything and about nothing... Besides all this, Armando Teixeira continues to hold a certain relish for humor, symbolism and daydreaming." The cover of Le Jeu is possibly a reference to the Nathaniel Merriweather (a.k.a. Dan The Automator) project Lovage (band), and his album Music to Make Love to Your Old Lady By, which is in itself a pastiche of Serge Gainsbourg's No. 2 album.

A Grande Mentira [The Big Lie], was released in 2006. Balla not only composed but also recorded, mixed and produced the entire album. The album includes a cover of "Oub`lá" by Mão Morta. Resumo (2000–2008) (Chiado Records/Sony BMG), released in 2008, is a collection of works from his first three albums.

Besides live touring regularly, Balla has played at several large Portuguese music festivals, including Festival Serra da Estrela 2007, headlining on the "Palco Planeta Sudoeste" stage at Festival Sudoeste in 2007 (alongside Datarock and Bonde do Rolê) and Festival Alive!07 in Oeiras alongside the Smashing Pumpkins and The White Stripes Balla has also contributed a duet with Paulo Gonzo to the "Movimento UPA", alongside Camané, JP Simões and Mariza, which campaigns to combat against discrimination toward people with mental illness.

== Discography ==
- Balla (Nortesul) - 2000
- Le Jeu (Music Mob) - 2003
- A Grande Mentira (Chiado Records) - 2006
- Resumo 2000/2008 (Chiado Records/Sony-BMG) - 2008
- Equilibrio (Chiado Records) - 2010
- Canções (Otimus) - 2012
- Arqueologia (EdiMusic) - 2015

== Other works ==
- Optimus 2000: we'vebeenwatchingyou (EMI-Valentim de Carvalho) - 2000
- Exploratory Music From Portugal (Calouste Gulbenkian Foundation) - 2001
- E se depois...: Tributo a Mão Morta (RagingPlanet) - 2007
