= Preto no Branco =

Studio album by Boss AC
- Released: 16 March 2009
- Recorded: Lisbon, Portugal; Rio de Janeiro, Brazil; New York City, United States
- Genre: Hip hop
- Language: Portuguese, English, Cape Verdean creole

Boss AC chronology
Ritmo, Amor e Palavras (2005)	Preto no Branco (2009)	AC Para os Amigos (2012)

Professional ratings
Review scores
Source	Rating
Time Out	(in note)
Disco Digital	(in note)

Preto no Branco (literally "black on white") was Boss AC's fourth album released on 16 March 2009 in Portugal. It celebrates fifteen years of his career from his first album Rapública (or Rapublic). The album features appearances by Olavo Bilac and TC and the duet by the fado singer Mariza who made the first disco single UPA - Undiso Para Ajudar, a disc with the original duets of Portuguese artists and serves with a company of social actions which had heard on the radio in late 2008, promoted by Associação Encontrar-se. Samples by Vitorino and the Cape Verdean singer Ildo Lobo are used in the album. The video of the single Estou Vivo was recorded in Macau.

The album was recorded in Lisbon, Rio de Janeiro and New York City.

== Track listing ==
No.	Title	Length
1.	"Bem-vindos os que vêm em paz"
2.	"Ainda"
3.	"Levanta-te (Stand Up)"
4.	"Estou vivo"
5.	"Tu queres e eu quero tambêm"
6.	"Eu amei eu chorei"
7.	"A boca diz o que quer"
8.	"És tão bonita (Es tão bonita)"
9.	"Alguém me ouviu" (feat. Mariza)
10.	"I Don?t Give?"
11.	"Better This Way"
12.	"Break U"
13.	"Rimas de Saudade"
14.	"Pa Nada"
15.	"Acabou (Até te esquecer)"
