= April Ivy =

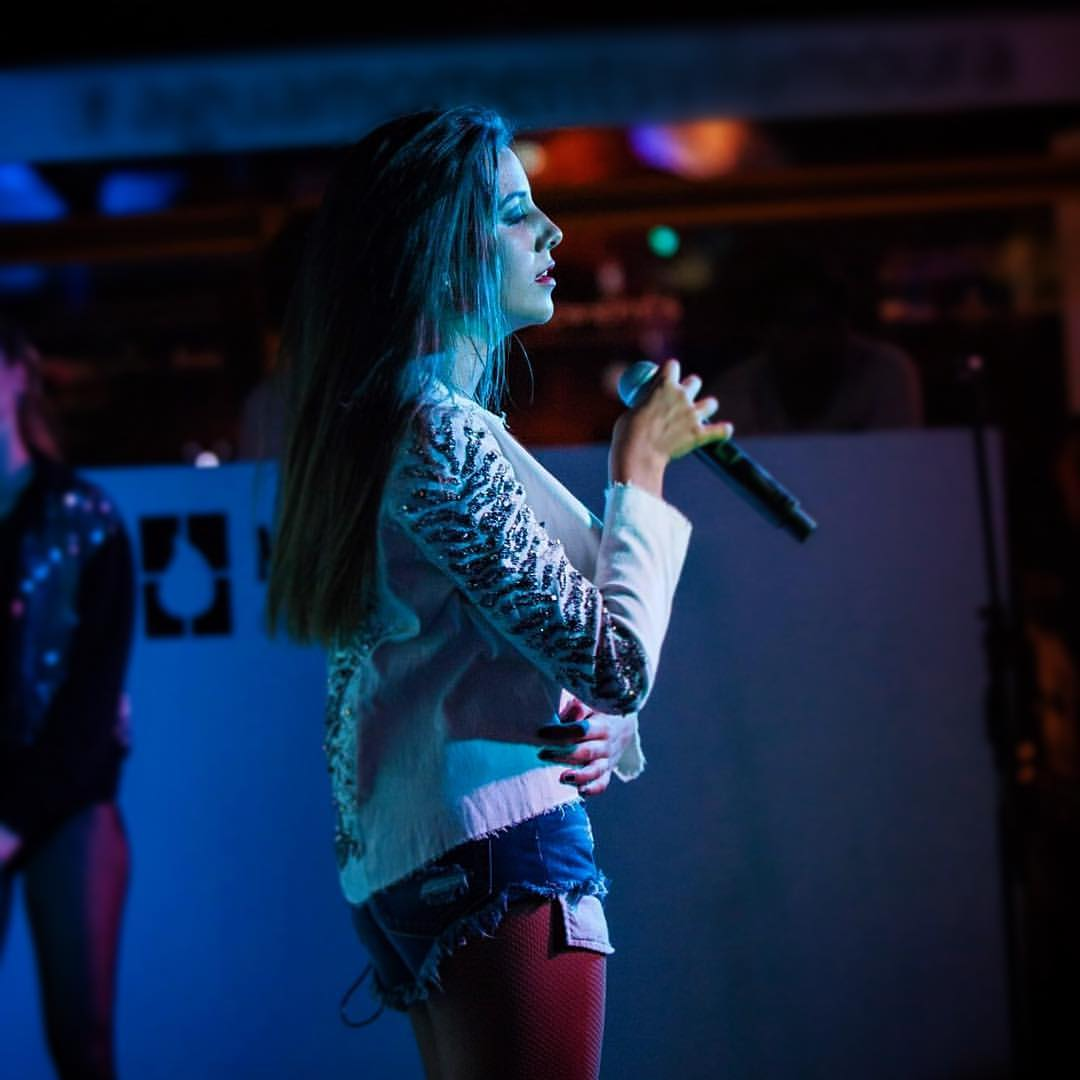
- April Ivy performing in a concert in 2017

Background information
- Born: Mariana Barreiros dos Santos Gonçalves; 10 July 1999 (age 27); Lisbon, Portugal
- Origin: Portugal
- Genres: Pop; electro-pop
- Occupations: Singer; Composer; Actress
- Instruments: Vocals; Piano; Guitar
- Years active: 2015–present

Mariana Barreiros dos Santos Gonçalves (born 10 July 1999), better known for her stage name, April Ivy, is a Portuguese singer-songwriter.

Since the age of 9, she has been getting a taste of the artistic world, either giving voice to Disney characters (Toy Story 3, Tangled, Minnie & You, etc.) or in the art of acting. With international training, she participated in several workshops in Portugal, Switzerland, Norway and England. It was also at this age that she started having both piano and voice lessons and formed her first band where she was the lead vocalist and guitar player (Flames on Fire). As a result of studying at St.Julians School ever since she was three years old until the age of 18, April feels her emotions in English. She then got a degree in Marketing and Advertisement at IADE - Universidade Europeia, whilst pursuing her musical career. Through her piano and guitar compositions, she is the writer and performer of her own songs, as well as composing for other artists.

== Career ==
April began performing at the age of 9 with her band 'Flames on Fire', where she was the guitarist and lead singer. The band would perform at school events and parties, and April (or Mariana at the time) would sell their merchandise to parents and friends. One year after, she was posting covers and original songs both on YouTube and Spotify.

She began her artistic career at the young age of 10 where she voiced the character 'Molly' for the Portuguese version of the Disney Movie 'Toy Story 3'. That was her first professional encounter to a studio and the artistic scene. Following that, she did the voice over for Disney productions 'Tangled' and 'Molly and Me'.

At the age of 14 as a school project, she did an internship at Portugal's radio station company for a week Grupo Renascença Multimedia, where she was scouted by Mega Hits’ director, Nelson Cunha.

Her first single was "Be Ok," and it was made as an independent artist. Composing and performing the song, she reached the top of national radio airplay list, as well as the top of national Spotify, YouTube and iTunes charts. In sales, the single reached the top 100 of the national charts debuting and peaking in 1st as well as being part of a Portuguese television teen series "Massa Fresca" soundtrack. Later in June 2016, she signed her first international deal with Universal Music France. Thanks to her chart-topping single 'Be Ok', April was then invited to perform at the Santa Casa Stage of the 2016 MEO Sudoeste. Later in November 2016, her song "Shut Up" soundtracked the Portuguese telenovela "A Impostora" .

April was nominated for Best Portuguese Act in the 2016 MTV EMA, as well as was nominated for Best Newcomer in the 2017 Golden Globes (Portugal) ending up losing to the actress Beatriz Frazão. April won the award Best Newcomer in the 2016 "Melhores do Ano" gala by Radio Nova Era.

On 5 August 2017 during her summer tour, April performed at the main stage, MEO Stage, of the 2017 MEO Sudoeste.

On 19 July 2019 she released her first album "game.of.love" which included her first six singles plus four new songs. The album was edited by Warner Music Portugal.

== Personal life ==
Mariana Barreiros dos Santos Gonçalves was born and raised in Lisbon, Portugal. Her mother has Italian ancestry, while her father is from Lisbon. Mariana is the middle child of two brothers, João Miguel aged 14, and Miguel aged 24. She studied at St. Julians School from the age of three, until college, where she got a degree in Marketing and Advertisement at IADE - Universidade Europeia, whilst pursuing her musical career.

She dated football player and International Portuguese player Ruben Dias from 2018 to 2021.

== Discography ==
=== Albums ===
Title	Details
game.of.love	Released: July 19, 2019; Label: Redmojo, Warner Music Portugal; Format: CD, digital download, streaming

=== Singles ===
List of singles, with year released, selected chart positions, certifications, and album name shown
Title	Year	Peak chart positions	Album
Title	Year	POR	Album
"Be Ok"	2016	91	game.of.love
"Shut Up"	2017	—	game.of.love
"Run For Cover"	2017	—	Non-album single
"Frida" (featuring Conductor)	2018	—	Non-album single
"Tell Me Baby"	2019	—	Non-album single
"Habits"	2019	—	Non-album single
"Can't Fight This Feeling"	2020	—	Non-album single
"Temporary Love"	2020	—	Non-album single
"Far From Home"	2020	—	Non-album single
"Fico por Aqui"	2021	—	Non-album single
"Broken Apologies"	2021	—	Non-album single
"—" denotes a recording that did not chart or was not released in that territory.

==== As featured artist ====
List of singles as featured artist, with selected chart positions and certifications
Title	Year	Peak chart positions	Album
Title	Year	POR	Album
"Não Sou Eu" (Diogo Piçarra featuring April Ivy)	2017	70	do=s
"Vem Na Vibe" (Blaya featuring April Ivy and Ella Nor)	2019	46	Blaya con Dios
