= Armando Teixeira (musician) =

Portuguese musician and record producer (born 1968)

Armando Teixeira (born 1968 in Lisbon) is a Portuguese musician and record producer. He has worked with a variety of projects within a wide scope of genres.

Teixeira is a former member of indie rock bands Ik Mux and Boris Ex-Machina, as well as the hip hop group Da Weasel and industrial metal band Bizarra Locomotiva. More recently, Teixeira has been involved with his solo projects Balla and Bulllet, where he worked with Kalaf, Nel'Assassin of Micro and the Legendary Tigerman.
