= Manda Chuva =

Studio album by Boss AC
- Released: December 3, 1998 in Portugal
- Recorded: New York City
- Genre: rap, hip-hop, reggae, R&B
- Language: Portuguese, English, Cape Verdean Creole
- Label: Valentim de Carvalho (NorteSul)
- Producer: Troy Hightower

Boss AC chronology
Manda Chuva (1998)	Rima Contra a Maré (2002)

Manda Chuva is Boss AC's debut album released on December 3, 1998, in Portugal. The album was recorded in New York City in the United States.

== About the album ==
As he started his first album, the career of Boss AC commemorates four years, in the Rapública (Portuguese for Rapublic) collection. For some four years, AC had shaped his style and gained notoriety between the hip-hop scene, he took part in albums by other groups and artists. These words made by AC, an album was created on a film or a treatise. In fact, these rhythmic letters on Manda Chuva's songs retraces history, which were created ("Andam Aí"), which were based in real facts *"Doa a quem doer"), it risen a film environment. The single released in the album "anda cá ao papá" was a good success, it includes a music video: AC which was a discotheque in the 1970s, with a huge afro hairstyle, trying to win over a girl .

== Track listing ==
No.	Title	Length
1.	"Olá" (Introduction)
2.	"Doa a Quem doer"
3.	"Tacebem" (with Q-pid)
4.	"Freestyle" (with DJ Soon)
5.	"Cheio de pressa"
6.	"Andam Aí"
7.	"Velhos tempos" (with Q-pid)
8.	"All Night Party" (with Konscious)
9.	"Tunga Tunginha" (with Ana Firmino)
10.	"Vida"
11.	"Coisas da Vida"
12.	"Anda cá ao papá" (with Sam e Q-pid)
13.	"Who The F*** is AC ?"
14.	"Corda"
15.	"Reconhece (tu s'ás com'é)" (with DJ Nee Nasty))
16.	"Hasta la vista (Outro)"
17.	"Dá-me Corda"
18.	"Depois do Bip" (Hidden track)
