= Lon3r Johny =

Portuguese rapper

LON3R JOHNY
- Born: João Freixo; March 22, 1994 (age 32); Lisbon, Portugal
- Genres: Hip hop tuga; trap; rage rap
- Occupations: Rapper; singer
- Instruments: Vocals
- Years active: 2012–present
- Labels: Think Music (2018–2020); Sony Music Portugal

João Freixo (born 22 March 1994) known professionally as LON3R JOHNY is a Portuguese rapper.

== Career ==
Freixo started making music in 2012 as "Johny BK" and using mainly boom bap beats. In 2013 he released his first public track "Escolhas". After some time living in London, Freixo returned to Portugal as "LON3R JOHNY" and showing off a new music style on his 2017 extend plays mixing emo with trap.

He gained national recognition after he joined in 2018, ProfJam's record label Think Music.

He performed at the 2019 Meo Sudoeste in the LG Stage.

In 21 October 2020 he left Think Music as the label was terminated weeks later in November.

In October 2022, LON3R released his second album "Vida Rockstar" in which he brings a new style to the portuguese hip-hop scene, rage rap, inspired by international rappers such as Yeat.

In July 2022 he performed at the first ever Rolling Loud festival in Europe, which had its first location in Portugal at Praia da Rocha, Portimão after it was cancelled the past two years due to COVID-19 restrictions.

== Discography ==
=== Albums ===
Title	Details
A Nave Vai Em Tour	Released: 23 April 2021 (POR); Label: Sony Music Portugal; Formats: Digital download, streaming
Vida Rockstar	Released: 14 October 2022 (POR); Label: Sony Music Portugal; Formats: Digital download, streaming
Ligação Tokyo	Released: 10 November 2023 (POR); Label: Sony Music Portugal; Formats: Digital download, streaming
94	Released: 10 April 2026 (POR); Label: Sony Music Portugal; Formats: Digital download, streaming

=== Mixtapes ===
Title	Details
Dubai Tape (with Cripta)	Released: 21 October 2021 (POR); Label: Sony Music Portugal; Formats: Digital download, streaming

=== Extended plays ===
Title	Details
SANGUE FRIO	Released: 26 June 2017 (POR); Formats: Digital download, streaming
DARKSIDE	Released: 3 August 2017 (POR); Formats: Digital download, streaming
GOTH LULLABY	Released: 29 April 2018 (POR); Label: Horrorclub; Formats: Digital download, streaming
COLD WINTER (with LOUIS DVART)	Released: 11 Janeiro 2018 (POR); Label: Horrorclub; Formats: Digital download, streaming
ANTI$$OCIAL (with Plutónio)	Released: 1 April 2023 (POR); Label: Sony Music Portugal; Formats: Digital download, streaming

=== Singles ===
==== As lead artist ====
List of singles, with selected details and chart positions
Title	Year	Peak chart positions	Album
Title	Year	POR	Album
"Crystal Castle"	2018	—	Non-album single(s)
"Trapstar"	2018	—	Non-album single(s)
"Death Note" (feat Fínix MG)	2019	79	Non-album single(s)
"Drip"	2019	34	Non-album single(s)
"GT3"	2019	17	Non-album single(s)
"Damn/Sky" (feat ProfJam)	2020	18	Non-album single(s)
"Rock"	2022	68	Non-album single(s)
"Hallywud" (feat ProfJam)	2022	27	Non-album single(s)
"—" denotes a recording that did not chart or was not released in that territory.

==== As featured artist ====
List of singles as featured artist, with selected chart positions and certifications
Title	Year	Peak chart positions	Album
Title	Year	POR	Album
"Tempo" (FrankieOnTheGuitar featuring T-Rex, LON3R JOHNY, Bispo)	2020	4	Non-album single(s)
"Safe" (Mizzy Miles featuring Lhast, LON3R JOHNY, 9 Miller)	2020	51	Non-album single(s)
"Pluto" (Lhast featuring LON3R JOHNY)	2020	173	AMOR'FATI
"—" denotes a recording that did not chart or was not released in that territory.

== See also ==
- Think Music Records
