= Rapública =

Compilation album
- Released: 1994
- Genre: rap, hip-hop
- Language: Portuguese, English, Cape Verdean Creole
- Label: Columbia - Sony Music
- Producer: Didi (12 and 13), D-Mars (2, 3 and 7), Boss AC (4 and 8), Zona Dread (6), Miguel A. (5 and 14), Nuno Miguel (10 and 11), Augusto Armada (track 9 and co-produced by Jorge Ferreira, track 1)

Rapública (partly known as Rapublic, Portuguese for "Rapublic" a portmanteau of "rap" and "republic") is the first compilation of Portuguese rap music released in 1994. It features Black Company, Boss AC, Family, Funky D, Líderes da Nova Mensagem, New Tribe and Zona Dread. The album was a pivotal moment in Portuguese music, marking the transition of rap and hip hop from underground movements to mainstream recognition, particularly with the radio hit "Nadar" by Black Company. In 2022, the album was reissued in vinyl.

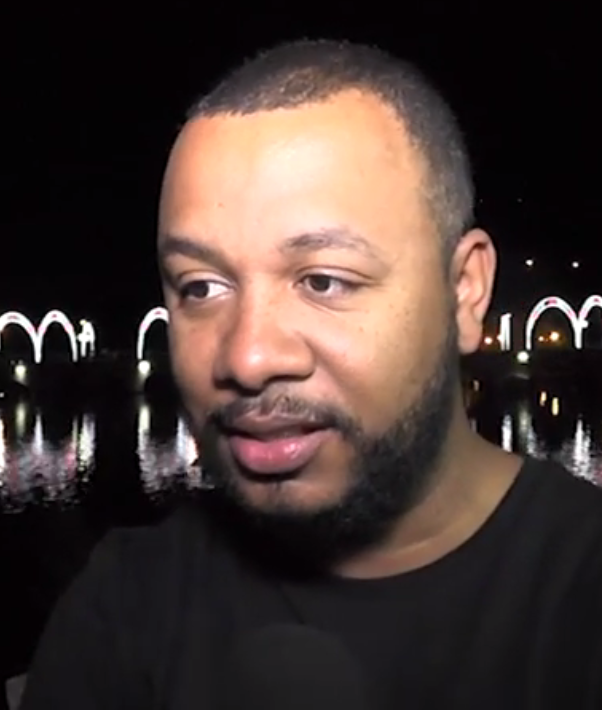
Boss AC

The album reflects the cultural shifts in Portugal following the Carnation Revolution and decolonization, as well as the growing influence of African immigrant communities. With its diverse styles and bold social commentary, Rapública introduced the genre to a wider audience, helping to establish Portuguese rap as a legitimate cultural force.

== Background ==
The release of Rapública in 1994 came at a time of profound social and cultural transformation in Portugal. Following decolonization and the 1974 Carnation Revolution, the country shifted from being a nation of emigrants to one that welcomed large immigration flows, particularly from former African colonies. Many immigrants settled in the bairros sociais (social housing) and bairros de lata (shanty towns) around Lisbon, creating the cultural foundation for Portuguese hip hop.

Prior to Rapública, rap was largely consumed by children of African immigrants, who had access to American rap through recordings from family members or friends abroad or living near the Lajes Air Base in the Azores.

One of the earliest hip hop communities emerged in Miratejo, a southern Lisbon neighborhood, where the B-Boy Boxers collective formed in the late 1980s. This crew, which embraced American rap culture, later inspired other groups, including Black Company, Líderes da Nova Mensagem, and General D. Initially, Portuguese MCs performed in English, emulating the American style, but over time, they began incorporating Cape Verdean Creole, Portuguese, and street slang, establishing a unique linguistic and musical identity for Portuguese rap. This evolution set the stage for Rapública, which became a defining moment in the country’s hip hop history.

By the early 1990s, rap had transitioned from street culture to performances in clubs. Starting in 1991, Boss AC organized hip hop events at Trópico, a nightclub in Santos, Lisbon, which became a hub for local artists.

The idea for Rapública was conceived by Tiago Faden of Sony Music Portugal and nightlife entrepreneur Hernâni Miguel. Many artists featured on the album, including Black Company, Líderes da Nova Mensagem, Zona Dread, and Boss AC himself, had connections to the Trópico scene. The album also included Funky D, who gained recognition from the popular television program Chuva de Estrelas.

== Composition and recording ==
Each artist contributed two tracks to Rapública, resulting in a diverse collection of songs that showcased the various styles and influences of the Portuguese hip hop scene. A notable feature of the album was the bilingual nature of many tracks, with artists opting to write their lyrics in both Portuguese and English. This shift in language reflected an ongoing transition within the local rap community, influenced by global trends. Brazilian rapper Gabriel o Pensador played a significant role in this transformation, as his success in Portugal encouraged local artists to experiment with incorporating Portuguese into their music. Tracks, such as "A Verdade" by Boss AC and "Só Queremos Ser Iguais" by Zona Dread, addressed important social and political themes, often focusing on the struggles and experiences of racialized youth in Portugal. In contrast to the more serious tracks, Rapública also featured lighter, celebratory songs, such as "Rabola Bô Corpo" by Family. Performed in Cape Verdean Creole, the track incorporated elements of ragga and dancehall. Tracks from New tribe, Lideres da Nova Mensagem and Boss AC featured samples, pioneering this practice in Portuguese rap music.

The album's cover depicts the suburbs of Lisbon, the origin of the artists featured in Rapública. It was designed by Célis Correia, the partner of Hernâni Miguel. "Nadar" by Black company was the only song for which a music video was recorded.

The production and recording of Rapública was challenging, as Sony failed to appropriately accommodate the needs of the artists. The artists were only given two days to record their songs, even though they had no professional experience and some had never been in a music studio. Furthermore, the process was spread across different studios and different producers, the later lacking experience working with hip hop.

== Critical and public reception ==
Rapública quickly gained national attention upon its release in 1994, thanks in part to the radio program Submarine, which specialized in underground music. The album was hailed as a groundbreaking effort to introduce Portuguese rap to a wider audience, capturing the raw energy and cultural diversity of Lisbon’s emerging hip hop scene. Critics praised its bold representation of the genre, and the inclusion of tracks like Black Company's Nadar helped the album reach beyond its underground roots to mainstream listeners.

Nadar became a national radio hit, and its catchy refrain, "Não sabe nadar" (Don't know how to swim) was adopted as a political slogan "As gravuras não sabem nadar" (The rock carvings do not know how to swim) to protect the prehistoric rock engravings at Foz Côa. The local high school used the phrase during a controversial national debate about the preservation of these engravings, which were at risk of being submerged by a dam with even President Mário Soares incorporating it into a speech. This phrase, along with the song’s success, amplified the track’s visibility, and the music video launched Black Company's professional career, propelling them to stardom.

The album was commercially successful, selling over 15,000 copies during the first year and earning a silver disc certification, a milestone for a Portuguese rap project at the time. Additionally, tracks like Rabola Bô Corpo by Family, became popular in African clubs, while Rap é uma Potência by Líderes da Nova Mensagem also garnered significant airplay. Despite these successes, Rapública faced some criticism for its uneven production quality, reflecting its rushed compilation process. While the album effectively showcased a variety of styles and voices, some critics noted that its lack of cohesion made it feel more like an exploratory project than a fully polished album.

== Legacy ==
Rapública marked the formal introduction of rap as a national cultural product in Portugal, significantly broadening its appeal beyond immigrant communities and helping establish its presence among middle-class audiences. Its legacy, however, is complex, encompassing both its role in elevating the genre and the challenges it presented to the artists and the broader hip hop movement.

Commercially, Rapública demonstrated that Portuguese rap had mainstream appeal. The success of tracks like Black Company’s Nadar, with its iconic refrain "Não sabe nadar", proved that rap could resonate across demographic and social lines. The album’s performance encouraged record labels to invest further in the genre, paving the way for subsequent releases by artists like General D, Da Weasel, and Mind da Gap.

However, the album also revealed the challenges of navigating the music industry. Many of the participating groups lacked the resources or industry support to build on their momentum. Contracts often tied them to restrictive agreements, limiting their creative freedom and professional growth. Critics have argued that Rapública, while a historic moment, highlighted the tension between rap’s roots as a grassroots, underground movement and its emergence as a commodified cultural product Plans for a second Rapública album were announced but never came to fruition. This missed opportunity left many feeling that the momentum generated by the first compilation was not fully capitalized upon.

Despite these challenges, Rapública had a lasting impact on the Portuguese hip hop scene. It inspired a new generation of artists to view rap as a legitimate form of expression and a viable career path. The album’s success also highlighted the potential for hip hop to address pressing social issues like racism, poverty, and inequality while resonating with diverse audiences.

== Track listing ==
No.	Title	Singer/Group	Length
1.	"Nadar"	Black Company
2.	"Putos da Rua"	Zona Dread
3.	"Minha Banda"	Funky D
4.	"A Verdade"	Boss AC
5.	"Palavras"	New Tribe
6.	"Só Queremos ser Iguais"	Zona Dread
7.	"É Natural"	Funky D
8.	"Generate Power"	Boss AC
9.	"Psyca Stle" (with Ana Firmino)	Black Company
10.	"Rap É Uma Potência""	Líderes da Nova Mensagem
11.	"Sê Tu Mesmo""	Líderes da Nova Mensagem
12.	"Hip Hop Está no Ar"	Family
13.	"Rabola Bô Corpo"	Family
14.	"Summer Season"	New Tribe

== See also ==
- Hip hop Tuga
