= SippinPurpp =

- Born: André Rocha Vaz; 19 April 1996 (age 30)
- Origin: Ovar, Aveiro, Portugal
- Genres: Trap, Hip hop tuga
- Occupation: Rapper
- Instrument: Voice
- Years active: 2017—present

SippinPurpp, stage name of André da Rocha Vaz (born 19 April 1996), is a Portuguese rapper. His hometown is Ovar, Portugal.

== Career ==
SippinPurpp started making music around 2017, posting his first music "No meu copo" on March 30, 2017. His rap name came a little before his rap career, based on the lean he was drinking, as he explained in his first ever interview on Curto Circuito In 2018, he joined ProfJam's Portuguese record label Think Music Records and was featured on Mike El Nite's song "Dr. Bayard". The song was a hit in Portuguese social media and got over 5 million views on YouTube.

Later on, he released his first single for the label, called "Sauce", which was a huge success in Portugal, getting over 9 million views on YouTube and 5 million streams on Spotify. The song also entered the top 10 of the Portuguese singles chart and stayed in that chart's top 15 for several weeks.

In 2019, he performed at Meo Sudoeste on the LG by MegaHits Stage.

In July 2021, he performed at the first ever Rolling Loud festival in Europe in Portugal at Praia da Rocha, Portimão.

== Discography ==
=== Extended plays ===
Title	Details
3880	Released: 6 December 2019 (POR); Label: Think Music Records

=== Singles ===
==== As lead artist ====
List of singles, with selected details and chart positions
Title	Year	Peak chart positions	Certifications	Album	
Title	Year	POR	Certifications	Album	
No Meu Copo	2017	—		Non-album single(s)	
PurppSeason	2017	—		Non-album single(s)	
Avião	2018	—		Non-album single(s)	
Sauce	2018	8	AFP: Double Platinum	3880	
Não Me Venhas Chatear	2019	—		3880	
Never Walk Alone	2019	26	AFP: Gold	3880	
Havana (feat. ProfJam)	2019	43	AFP: Gold	3880	
Extravagante	2019	68	-	3880	
1000 Jogos	2020	33	AFP: Gold	Non-album single(s)	
Fato treino do City	2022	5	AFP: Gold	Non-album single(s)	"—" denotes a recording that did not chart or was not released in that territory.

==== As featured artist ====
List of singles as featured artist, with selected chart positions and certifications
Title	Year	Peak chart positions	Album
Title	Year	POR	Album
Dr. Bayard (Mike El Nite featuring Fínix MG, Sippinpurpp)	2018	80	Inter-Missão
"—" denotes a recording that did not chart or was not released in that territory.
