= Rimar Contra a Maré =

Rimar contra a Maré

Studio album by Boss AC
- Released: December 2002 in Portugal
- Recorded: New York City
- Genre: rap, hip-hop
- Language: Portuguese, English, Cape Verdean Creole
- Producer: Boss AC, Troy Hightower

Boss AC chronology
Manda Chuva (1998)	Rimar contra a Maré (2002)	Ritmo, Amor e Palavras (2005)

Professional ratings
Review scores
Source	Rating
h2tuga.net	(in note)

Rimar contra a Maré was Boss AC's second album released in December 2002 in Portugal. In February 2005, a music video Quieres Dinero, produced by Gotto was nominated at the African Music Video Awards in the Category of Best Special Effects on the South African Channel Channel O.

== Track listing ==
No.	Title	Length
1.	"Intro"
2.	"Sempore o Mesmo Boss AC"
3.	"Baza Baza"
4.	"Eu Tou Aqui"
5.	"Na Área"
6.	"Scratch na Área"
7.	"A Carta Que Nunca Te Escrevi"
8.	"Quieres Dinero" (with Gutto aka Bantú)
9.	"Dia Assim (Ainda Bem)"
10.	"Julgamento Final"
11.	"Lena" (with Gutto aka Bantú)
12.	"Bué de Rimas"
13.	"Mantém-te Firme"
14.	"Outro (Obrigado)"
15.	"E Mintira" (with TC - bonus track)
16.	"Bué de Rimas" (remix - bonus track)
