= Central de Cervejas =

Portuguese brewery

Sociedade Central de Cervejas e Bebidas, S.A.

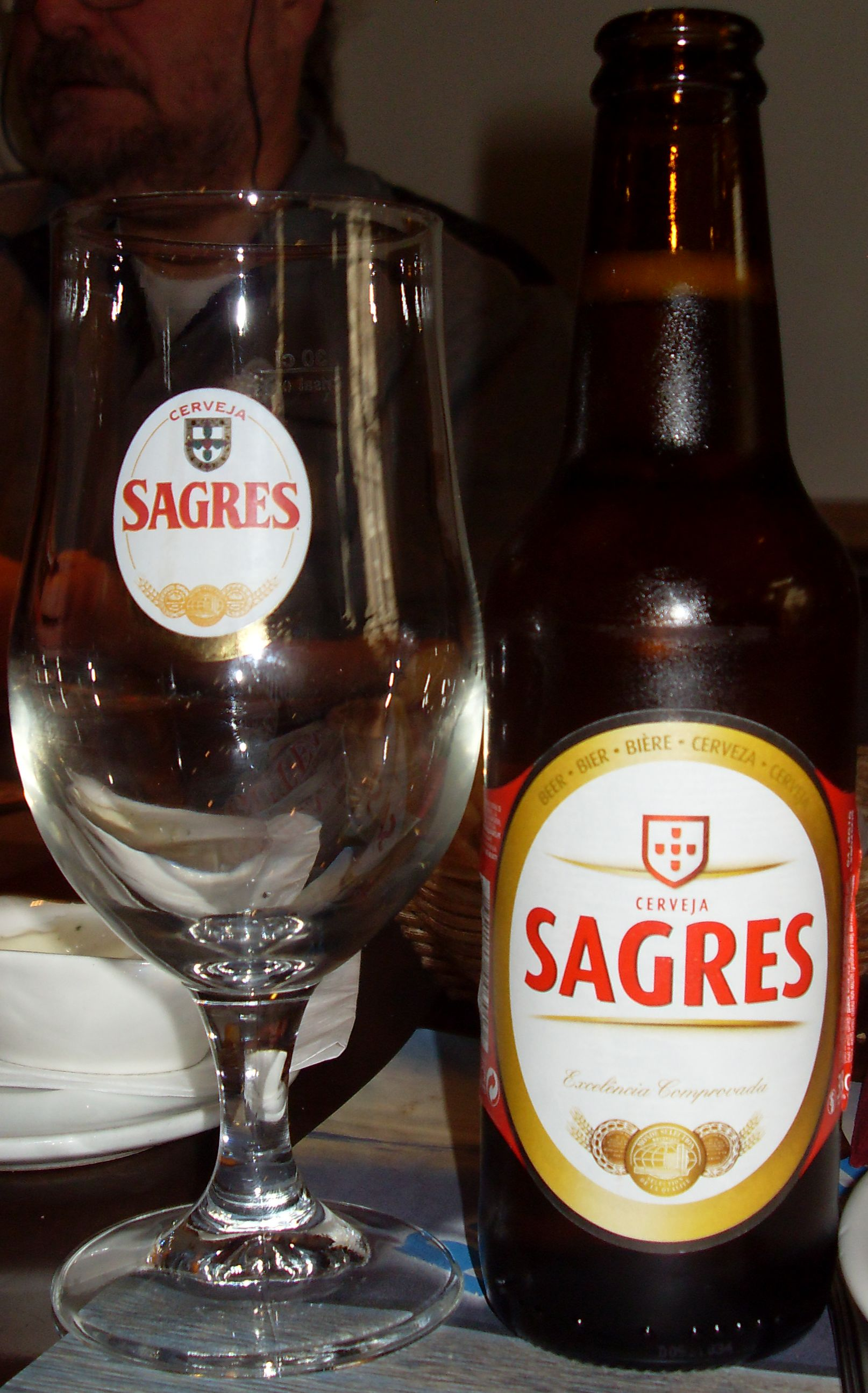
- Company type: Sociedade Anónima
- Industry: Beverages
- Founded: 1934
- Headquarters: Vialonga, Portugal
- Products: Sagres (beer)
- Production output: Beer and Beverages
- Parent: Heineken
- Website: www.centralcervejas.pt

Sociedade Central de Cervejas (SCC; full name: SCC – Sociedade Central de Cervejas e Bebidas, S.A.) is a Portuguese brewery, founded in 1934. Its main output is the Sagres brand of beers. The company has been controlled by Heineken since April 2008.

== History ==
Sociedade Central de Cervejas was established in 1934, with the aim of selling the beers produced by the former breweries, Companhia Produtora de Malte e Cerveja Portugália, Companhia de Cervejas Estrela, Companhia de Cervejas Coimbra and Companhia da Fábrica de Cerveja Jansen. In 1935, and after 99 years of activity, Fábrica de Cervejas Trindade was integrated by Sociedade Central de Cervejas (SCC).

Centralcer – Central de Cervejas, E.P. is incorporated in 1977 as a result of the merger of Sociedade Central de Cervejas, S.A.R.L. (incorporated in 1934) with Cergal – Cervejas de Portugal, S.A.R.L. (incorporated in 1972).

Centralcer – Central de Cervejas, S.A. was therefore created as a result of the above-mentioned company's conversion into a joint stock company, regulated according to Decree-Law no. 300/90 of 24 September. The company's total share capital is privatised in 1990, and it is the first operation of this kind to be undertaken in Portugal. The Bavaria Group purchases a shareholding in Centralcer – Central de Cervejas, S.A., and becomes one of its main shareholders.

In 2000, there is a further alteration to the company's shareholding structure, as a result of its sale to VTR-SGPS, S.A., a group of Portuguese investors (Parfil, BES, Fundação Byssaia Barreto, Olinveste and Fundação Oriente), amongst whom are the inheritors of SCC's founding shareholders. In its turn and in the summer of the same year, this group assigned a 49% share to the international brewing group Scottish & Newcastle.

In terms of the Group's organisation restructuring, the merger of Centralcer – Central de Cervejas, S.A. in Centralcontrol S.G.P.S., S.A. (merging company) was concluded in December 2001. The new merged entity changed its corporate denomination to SCC – Sociedade Central de Cervejas, S.A., as well as its head office, which is now located at the factory premises.

In 2003, Scottish & Newcastle purchases Parfil's total shareholding, assuming total control of Sociedade Central de Cervejas and Sociedade da Água de Luso.

In December 2004, the Company became known as SCC – Sociedade Central de Cervejas e Bebidas, S.A., a name that better reflects the scope of its activity, which not only includes beer, but also other products like bottled water and soft drinks.

In 2007, after a consortium was set up between Carlsberg and Heineken a takeover bid was made for the acquisition of the Scottish & Newcastle Group. As a result of the negotiations, the acquisition was accomplished, with Heineken taking over the control of Sociedade Central de Cervejas e Bebidas (SCC) on 29 April 2008, following the conclusion of the Consortium's acquisition of Scottish & Newcastle (S&N). The consortium was dissolved after the deal was completed.

== Brands ==
SCC produces a range of beers, mainly pale lagers. Sagres brand was born in 1940 as a prestige beer, to represent Sociedade Central de Cervejas at the Portuguese World Exhibition inaugurated in May 1940. Sagres is named after a town of the same name, a small village located in the most south-westerly point of Europe, and where sailors learned all about the navigation science. With a similar fate to the caravels that left from Lisbon to faraway lands, Sagres was the first beer to be exported, arriving first in Gibraltar, and moving on to the Azores and the Overseas Territories of Angola, Cape Verde Islands, Guinea Bissau, São Tomé and Príncipe, Timor, Goa, Macau and Mozambique. Nowadays Sagres beer is present in almost every corner of the world, wherever there is a Portuguese community. Sagres (5.0% abv) is a pale lager (branca). Sagres was the first Portuguese brand to launch the Mini version (20cl).

Sagres Preta (4.3% abv) is a dark Munich type of beer. For many years, Sagres Preta was the only dark ale on the domestic market.

Sagres Bohemia (6.2% abv) is an auburn beer with a reddish amber colour. It was launched in 2005.

Sagres Radler (2.0% abv) is a beer and fruit juice drink, made of Sagres beer mixed with lemon juice.

Sagres Sem Álcool (0.3% abv) is a light non-alcoholic beer. It was launched in 2005.

Sagres Sem Álcool Preta (0.3% abv) is a non-alcoholic dark ale that was launched in 2007.

Sagres Special Editions appear once or twice a year in limited quantities. Examples include Sagres Preta Chocolate, Sagres Festa, and Sagres Puro Malte.

== Marketing ==
Sociedade Central de Cervejas e Bebidas promotes the Sagres brand through a very strong liaison with football. Sagres has a long-term sponsorship deal with the Liga Portuguesa Futebol, the highest level of professional football (soccer) in Portugal. As a result, the league was officially called Liga ZON Sagres. Besides that, Sagres beer is also official sponsor of many professional teams, like Benfica, Braga, Olhanense and Académica Coimbra. Sagres has also been an official sponsor of the Portugal national team since 1993.
