= Entre(tanto) =

Studio album by Sam the Kid
- Released: 1999
- Genre: Hip hop

Sam the Kid chronology
Entre(tanto) (1999)	Sobre(tudo) (2002)

Entre(tanto) is Sam the Kid's debut album and was widely considered a breakthrough in Portuguese hip-hop culture. The single he released for this album is called "Lágrimas". The album was re-released in the special edition of Sobre(tudo) called Sobre(tudo) (Special Edition).

== Track listing ==
#	Title	Featured Guest(s)
1	"Entre(tanto)"	
2	"Pelas Rimas"	NBC & Jah3
3	"Ódio"	
4	"Xeg & Sam"	Xeg & Sanryse
5	"Reflexo"	
6	"Tempestade"	
7	"7º Céu"	
8	"A Caixa"	
9	"A Verdade"	
10	"Estranha Forma de Vida"	
11	"Visões"	
12	"Mil Razões"	
13	"Vício (Mundo Verbal)"	
14	"Lágrimas"	
15	"Verdade (Remix)"	DJ Bomberjack & Shaheen
