= Piruka =

Portuguese rapper

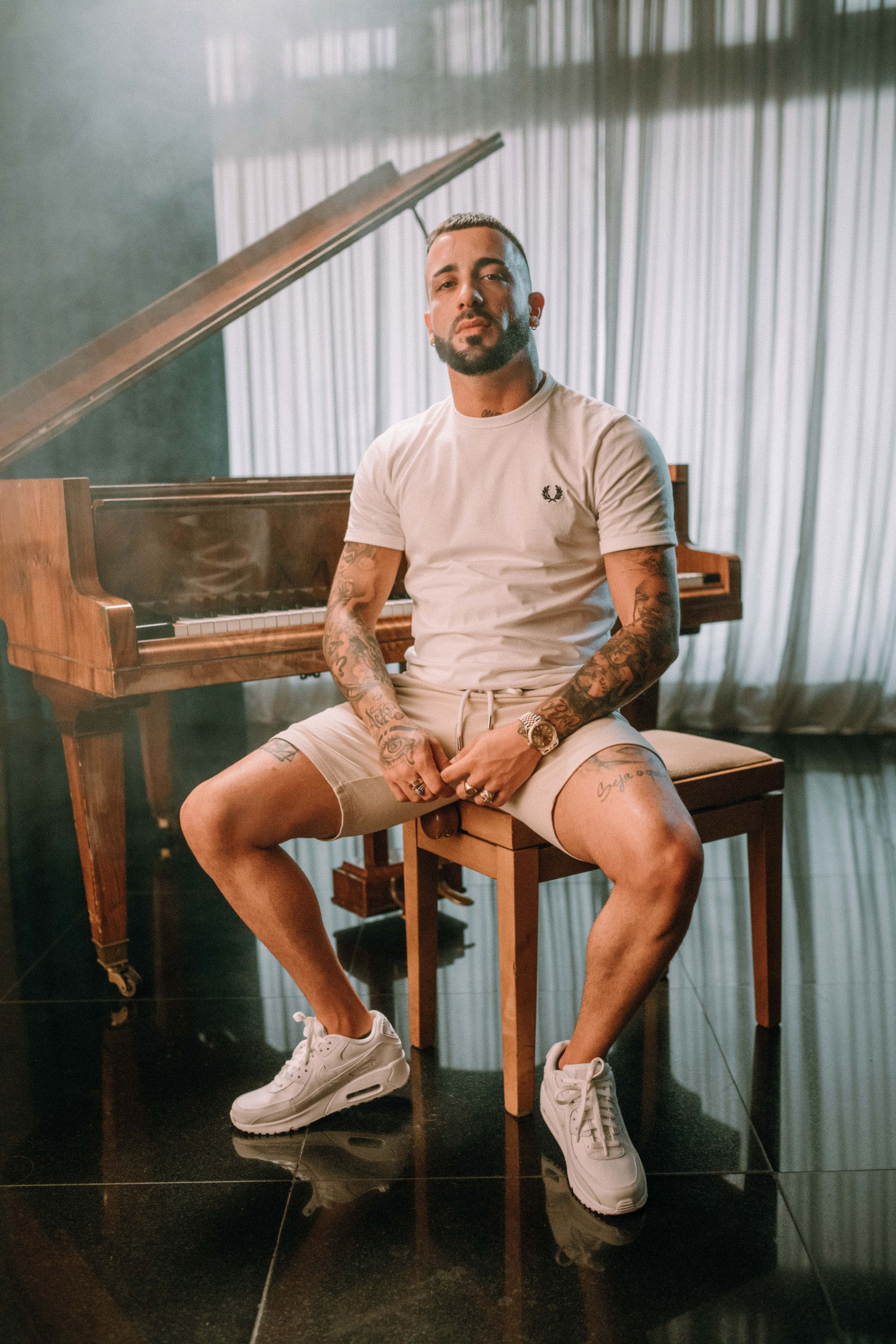
- Piruka in 2021

Background information
- Also known as: Piruka
- Born: André Filipe de Macieira; 4 March 1993 (age 33); Madorna, Cascais, Lisbon, Portugal
- Origin: Madorna
- Genres: Hip-hop, Hip hop tuga
- Occupations: Rapper, singer
- Years active: 2013-
- Labels: 808 MEDIA, Altafonte

André Filipe de Oliveira, better known by the stage name Piruka (born March 4, 1993) is a Portuguese rapper.

== Career ==
In July 2021, he performed at the first ever Rolling Loud festival in Europe, in Portugal at Praia da Rocha, Portimão.

== Discography ==
=== Albums ===
Title	Details	Certifications	Peak chart positions
Title	Details	Certifications	POR
Quatro Cantos	Released: October 2014 (POR)		—
Pára e Pensa	Released: 28 October 2015 (POR); Labels: SWG Music, Espacial		46
AClara	Released: February 2017 (POR); Labels: SWG Music	AFP: 6× Platinum	—

=== Singles ===
List of singles, with selected details and chart positions
Title	Year	Peak chart positions	Certifications	|Album
Title	Year	POR	Certifications	|Album
"Ca Bu Fla Ma Nau" (feat. Mota Jr)	2016	17		AClara
"Se Eu Não Acordar Amanhã"	2016	16	AFP: Platinum	AClara
"AClara"	2017	84		AClara
"Clara"	2017	82		AClara
"Meu Deslize"	2017	89		AClara
"Minha Pergunta"	2017	64		AClara
"Não Queiras Tentar"	2017	71		AClara
"Não Se Passa Nada"	2017	25	AFP: Gold	AClara
"Por Isso"	2017	88		AClara
"Queres Falar Do Quê?"	2017	56		AClara
"Sirenes"	2017	43		AClara
"Certidão de Óbito"	2017	55		Non-album single(s)
"Não Faz Isso"	2017	7		Non-album single(s)
"Salto Alto"	2017	4	AFP: 2× Platinum	Non-album single(s)
"Só Vim Dizer Yau"	2017	6		Non-album single(s)
"Já Se Passou Tudo" (feat. 1Kilo)	2018	16		Non-album single(s)
"Prova dos 9"	2018	27		Non-album single(s)
"Até Já"	2019	40		Non-album single(s)
"Impossíveis"	2019	14	AFP: Platinum	Non-album single(s)
"Louco" (feat. Bluay)	2019	1		Non-album single(s)
"—" denotes a recording that did not chart or was not released in that territory.
