= Beats Vol 1: Amor =

Studio album by Sam the Kid
- Released: December 2002
- Genre: Hip hop
- Length: 64:24
- Label: Loop:Recordings

Sam the Kid chronology
Sobre(tudo) (2002)	Beats Vol 1: Amor (2002)	Sobre(tudo) (Special Edition) (2004)

In 2002, Sam the Kid released an instrumental album entitled Beats Vol 1: Amor through Loop:Recordings Using resources like vinyl, discs, soap operas, videos and recorded phone calls among others, Sam The Kid created his album, inspired by the love of his parents, to whom he dedicated the album.

== Track listing ==
#	Title	Featured Guest(s)
1	"Beleza"	
2	"O Keu Kero"	
3	"Sedução"	
4	"Vem"	
5	"Eternamente Hoje"	
6	"Alma Gémea"	
7	"A Fundação"	
8	"Fogo Sem Chama"	
9	"Lances"	
10	"A Manhã Seguinte"	
11	"Até Um Dia"	
12	"Arrependimento"	
13	"Memórias"	
14	"Quando A Saudade Aperta"	
15	"Eu E Tu"	
16	"Recaída"	
17	"O Amor Não Tem Fim"	
