= Think Music Records =

Portuguese record label

- Founded: 20 March 2016
- Founder: ProfJam
- Status: Inactive
- Genre: Hip hop; Rap; Trap
- Country of origin: Portugal

Think Music Records was a Portuguese record label mainly focused on hip-hop, rap and trap music. The label was founded on 20 March 2016 by the Portuguese rapper, ProfJam.

== History ==
ProfJam created the label in 2016, on which he released his album Mixtakes. This was also the first big production of the label.

Thereafter, the label produced many country known singles, hitting the national tops of YouTube, Apple Music or Spotify.

"Água de Coco", of ProfJam was the most successful single of the label hitting the gold certification for sales by Associação Fonográfica Portuguesa and the top 10 of the national singles chart for a few weeks. The music video is also the one with most views on YouTube with over 12 million views.

Recently, the label partnered with the Portuguese virtual carrier, WTF, where they released the song "Só Que Sim", which also counted with the presence of many known youtubers.

== Artists ==
=== Members ===
Artist(s) name	Job	Join date
ProfJam (owner)	Record producer, singer-songwriter	2016
Nélson Monteiro	Manager	2016
Prettieboy Johnson	Singer-songwriter	2017
Benji Price	Record producer	2017
Yuzi	Singer-songwriter	2017
Oseias	Record producer	2017
Osémio Boémio	Record producer	2017
Rkeat	Record producer	2017
Ventura (Lvin)	Record producer	2017
Fínix MG	Singer-songwriter	2017
Mike El Nite	Singer-songwriter	2017
SippinPurpp	Singer-songwriter	2018
Lon3r Johny	Singer-songwriter	2018
Xtinto	Singer-songwriter	2019

== Discography ==
=== Albums ===
Artist	Album	Details
ProfJam (owner)	Mixtakes	Released: 30 March 2016; Format: CD; Mixtape
ProfJam (owner)	#FFFFFF	Released: 22 February 2019; Format: CD; Album
ProfJam (with Benji Price)	System	Released: 25 July 2020; Format: CD; Album
Oseias	[trinta&sete.]	Released: 21 May 2017; Format: CD; Album
Ventura	Tá Ligado	Released: 27 August 2017; Format: Digital; Album
Fínix MG	Níveis	Released: 12 November 2017; Format: CD; Extended play
Fínix MG	Robert Johnson	Released: 9 February 2020; Format: Digital; Album
Mike El Nite	Inter-Missão	Released: 7 December 2018; Format: CD; Album
Xtinto	Inacabado	Released: 1 December 2019; Format: Digital; Extended play
SippinPurpp	3880	Released: 6 December 2019; Format: Digital; Extended play

=== Singles ===
Artist	Single	Details
ProfJam (owner)	Xamã	Released: 20 December 2016
ProfJam (owner)	Matar o Game	Released: 1 March 2017
ProfJam (owner)	Mortalhas	Released: 19 June 2017
ProfJam (owner)	Yabba	Released: 20 February 2018
ProfJam (owner)	Gwapo	Released: 23 April 2018; Featuring: Yuzi
ProfJam (owner)	Hei	Released: 23 January 2020
Yuzi	#YuziGang	Released: 5 February 2017
Yuzi	XXX	Released: 11 April 2017
Yuzi	Plug on the Phone	Released: 9 July 2017
Yuzi	#ShutUp	Released: 26 November 2017
Yuzi	Tsubasa	Released: 19 December 2017
Yuzi	Tómas	Released: 12 March 2018
Yuzi	Bando	Released: 20 March 2018
Yuzi	Behave	Released: 1 May 2019
Yuzi	KBK	Released: 27 June 2019
Yuzi	Capaz	Released: 13 March 2020
Prettieboy Johnson	Money Bags	Released: 21 February 2017
Prettieboy Johnson	Vitamina	Released: 16 July 2017
Prettieboy Johnson	Rapina	Released: 17 September 2017
Prettieboy Johnson	Stank	Released: 11 October 2019
Prettieboy Johnson	Bonnie & Clyde	Released: 29 November 2019
Prettieboy Johnson	Spaceship	Released: 29 January 2020; Featuring: Yuri NR5
Benji Price	40 oz. Freestyle	Released: 8 March 2017
Benji Price	2am in Shibuya Freestyle	Released: 25 May 2017
Benji Price	Trono	Released: 3 September 2017
Benji Price	Jörmungandr	Released: 10 January 2019
Benji Price	Solero	Released: 28 January 2019
Benji Price	Badman Ting	Released: 17 June 2019; Featuring: ProfJam
L-Ali	Uaia	Released: 4 May 2017; Featuring: ProfJam
L-Ali	Baba	Released: 24 July 2017
Lon3r Johny	Crystal Castle	Released: 12 August 2018
Lon3r Johny	Trapstar	Released: 18 November 2018
Lon3r Johny	Death Note	Released: 18 February 2019; Featuring: Fínix MG
Lon3r Johny	Drip	Released: 21 June 2019
Lon3r Johny	GT3	Released: 11 November 2019
Lon3r Johny	Damn/Sky	Released: 8 March 2020; Featuring: ProfJam
Fínix MG	Awesome	Released: 27 August 2018
Mike El Nite	Type R	Released: 27 February 2020; Featuring: Benji Price

== See also ==
- List of record labels
