= Sobre(tudo) =

Studio album by Sam the Kid
- Released: January 2002
- Genre: Hip hop

Sam the Kid chronology
Entre(tanto) (1999)	Sobre(tudo) (2002)	Beats Vol 1: Amor (2002)

Sobre(tudo) was a 2002 album by Sam the Kid. The first single released for this album was called "Não Percebes". The album was re-released in 2005 in a special edition with tracks from Entre(tanto) included as bonus tracks. The re-release was called Sobre(tudo) (Special Edition).

== Track listing ==
#	Title	Featured Guest(s)
1	"Sobre(tudo)"	
2	"Metaforica-mente"	
3	"Decisões"	
4	"Não Percebes"	
5	"B.I."	
6	"Talvez"	Beto & DJ Cruzfader
7	"Q Mal Tem"	
8	"O Recado"	
9	"Representa o Teu Mundo"	
10	"P.S.P."	
11	"Lamentos"	
12	"+"	GQ & DJ Cruzfader
13	"Cuarras"	
14	"Chelas"	NBC
15	"Sociedade Confusa "	DJ Cruzfader
16	"Musa"	Filhos de Um Deus Menor & Regula
17	"Realidade Urbana "	DJ Cruzfader
18	"Sangue"	
