= Pratica(mente) =

Studio album by Sam the Kid
- Released: December 8, 2006
- Genre: Hip hop
- Length: 16:32
- Label: Edel
- Producer: Destino

Sam the Kid chronology
Sobre(tudo) (Special Edition) (2004)	Pratica(mente) (2006)

Pratica(mente) is a 2006 studio album by prominent Portuguese rapper and producer Sam the Kid. It is his first studio album, all of his previous works being recorded in his home.

The album features many prominent Portuguese artists, such as Melo D, Cool Hipnoise, Lil John from Buraka Som Sistema, Kalaf, valete, Cruzfader, NBC, G.Q. and Carlos Bica.

The album's single is called "Poetas de Karaoke".

== Track listing ==
#	Title	Featured Guest(s)
1	"Pratica(mente)"	Viriato Ventura
2	"A partir de Agora"	DJ Cruzfader
3	"Juventude (É Mentalidade)"	NBC, Milton Gulli
4	"Poetas de Karaoke"	GQ
5	"À procura da perfeita repetição"	DJ Cruzfader
6	"Abstenção"	
7	"Negociantes"	Snake & SP
8	"Retrospectiva de um Amor Profundo"	DJ Cruzfader, Milton Gulli, Marga Munguambe, Cool Hipnoise
9	"Presta Atenção"	Valete
10	"Pus-me a pensar"	Lil John & Kalaf
11	"Ignorância"	
12	"16/12/95"	
13	"De repente"	
14	"Slides (retratos da cidade branca)"	Viriato Ventura
15	"Slides (referências)"	Melo D & DJ Cruzfader
16	"Tempo"	NBC & Pacotes
17	"Hereditário"	

== Charts ==
2025 chart performance for Pratica(mente)
Chart (2025)	Peak position
Portuguese Albums (AFP)	70
