= Dengaz =

- Born: Luís Mendes; 9 August 1984 (age 42); Cascais
- Genres: Hip hop Tuga, Reggae
- Occupations: Rapper, singer-songwriter
- Years active: 1998–present
- Label: Sony Music

Luís Mendes, mostly known by his stage name Dengaz (born 9 August 1984), is a Portuguese rapper and hip-hop musician.

== Discography ==
=== Albums ===
Title	Details	Peak chart positions
Title	Details	POR
Skill, Respeito & Humildade	Released: 1 May 2010 (POR)	—
AHYA	Released: 6 August 2014 (POR)	—
Para Sempre	Released: 20 November 2015 (POR); Label(s): Sony Music	10
Para Sempre: Unplugged	Released: 2 December 2016 (POR); Label(s): Sony Music	14

=== Singles ===
List of singles, with selected details and chart positions
Title	Year	Peak chart positions	Certifications	Album
Title	Year	POR	Certifications	Album
"Nada Errado" (featuring António Zambujo)	2016	64	AFP: Platinum	Para Sempre
"Dizer Que Não" (featuring Matay)	2016	8	AFP: 4× Platinum	Para Sempre
"Só Uma Vibe" (featuring Carla Prata)	2017	89		Non-album single(s)
"—" denotes a recording that did not chart or was not released in that territory.
