= Orelha Negra =

Portuguese band

- Origin: Portugal
- Genres: Hip hop; funk; soul; trip-hop; plunderphonics
- Years active: 2009–present
- Labels: ArtHouse; NorteSul; Meifumado
- Members: Fred Ferreira; Sam The Kid; Francisco Rebelo; João Gomes; DJ Cruzfader

Orelha Negra are a Portuguese instrumental hip-hop/funk/soul band, formed in 2009. The band consists of Sam The Kid (samplers, synthesizer), Francisco Rebelo (bass), João Gomes (keyboards), Fred Ferreira (drums) and DJ Cruzfader (turntables).

To date, all of Orelha Negra's studio albums are self-titled. Their third album reached number-one in the Portuguese album charts in 2017.

== Members ==
- Sam The Kid – samplers, synthesizer
- Francisco Rebelo – bass
- João Gomes – keyboards
- Fred Ferreira – drums
- DJ Cruzfader – turntables

== Discography ==
=== Studio albums ===
Title	Details	Peak chart positions
Title	Details	POR
Orelha Negra	Released: March 22, 2010; Label: ArtHouse; Formats: CD, LP, digital download	9
Orelha Negra	Released: May 21, 2012; Label: NorteSul; Formats: CD, LP, digital download	4
Orelha Negra	Released: September 15, 2017; Label: Meifumado; Formats: CD, LP, digital download	1
"—" denotes a recording that did not chart or was not released in that territory.

=== Collaboration albums ===
- Mixtape (2011)
- Mixtape II (2013)
