= ProfJam =

- Born: Mário Cotrim; 6 June 1991 (age 35); Lisbon, Portugal
- Genre: Hip hop tuga
- Occupation: Singer-songwriter
- Years active: 2008–present
- Labels: Think Music, Universal Music Portugal
- Website: http://www.profjam.pt/

Mário Cotrim, mostly known by his stage name ProfJam (born 6 June 1991), is a Portuguese rapper and hip hop singer.

== Career ==
ProfJam started his career in 2008. His first exposition to the Hip Hop audience occurred when he participated in the Portuguese competition "Liga Knockout", where rappers had to make their own rhymes to defeat their opponent in a 1v1 punchlines battle.

Later on, after dropping out from a Computer Science and Information Systems class at Instituto Superior Técnico, he went to London to pursue a degree in audio production, in the SAE Institute.

In 2016, he created his own record label, Think Music Records. Think Music Records has signed Portuguese artists such as Yuzi, Sippinpurpp, Mike El Nite, Lon3r Johny, among others.

In January 2019, it was announced that ProfJam would perform on the main stage of Super Bock Super Rock 2019, on 20 July. In 2018, he performed at the same music festival but on the secondary stage.

After he released his album #FFFFFF in February 2019, almost every song on the album got to the top 100 of Associação Fonográfica Portuguesa singles charts. The song "Tou Bem" featuring Lhast, got to the number 1 spot on the Portuguese charts and on the main social media streaming services, like YouTube or Spotify. The records, "Água de Coco" and "Tou Bem" reached the platinum certification as they got over 20,000 sales registered by AFP. The album reached the number 1 spot on the Portuguese charts in March 2019.

== Personal life ==
On 10 October 2019, he was hospitalized after suffering from a psychosis due to drug abuse while he was writing his new song "'Anjos e Demónios'".

== Discography ==
=== Mixtapes ===
Title	Details
The Bing Banger Theory	Released: 6 June 2014 (POR); Label: ASTROrecords
Mixtakes	Released: 30 March 2016 (POR); Label: Think Music Records

=== Albums ===
==== Studio albums ====
Title	Details	Certifications	Peak chart positions
Title	Details	Certifications	POR
#FFFFFF	Released: 23 February 2019 (POR); Labels: Think Music Records, Sony Music; Formats: CD, digital download, streaming	AFP: Gold	1
#000000	12 February 2020 (POR); Label: Think Music Records; Formats: Audiovisual	—	—
MDID	5 May 2023 (POR); Label: Virgin Music Portugal; Formats: Digital download, streaming	AFP: Gold	51

==== Collaborative albums ====
Title	Details	Certifications	Peak chart positions
Title	Details	Certifications	POR
System (with Benji Price)	25 June 2020 (POR); Label: Think Music Records, Sony Music; Formats: CD, digital download	—	—

=== Singles ===
==== As lead artist ====
List of singles, with selected details and chart positions
Title	Year	Peak chart positions	Certifications	Album
Title	Year	POR	Certifications	Album
"Xamã"	2016	—		Non-album single(s)
"Mortalhas"	2017	—		Non-album single(s)
"Yabba"	2018	—		Non-album single(s)
"Gwapo" (featuring Yuzi)	2018	—		Non-album single(s)
"Água de Côco"	2018	8	AFP: 2× Platinum	#FFFFFF
"Tou Bem" (with Lhast)	2018	1	AFP: 3× Platinum	#FFFFFF
"À Palavra"	2019	15		#FFFFFF
"À Vontade" (feat Fínix MG)	2019	4	AFP: Platinum	#FFFFFF
"Caveira"	2019	47		#FFFFFF
"Interlúdio"	2019	65		#FFFFFF
"Malibu"	2019	14	AFP: Platinum	#FFFFFF
"Minha"	2019	20		#FFFFFF
"Na Zona"	2019	38		#FFFFFF
"O Hino"	2019	36		#FFFFFF
"Se Calhar"	2019	50		#FFFFFF
"Badman Ting" (with Benji Price)	2019	—		Non-album single(s)
"Hei"	2020	7		L.S.D. "Love Songs Die"
"Sistema" (with Benji Price)	2020	27		System
"Tribunal" (with Benji Price)	2020	13		System
"Finais" (with Benji Price)	2020	36		System
"Xpidi" (with Benji Price)	2020	50		System
"Lutei" (with Benji Price)	2020	62		System
"#24" (with Benji Price)	2020	55		System
"Perfection" (with Benji Price)	2020	56		System
"Crânio" (with Benji Price)	2020	70		System
"Origami" (with Benji Price)	2020	81		System
"Sempre" (with Benji Price)	2020	78		System
"Imortais" (with Benji Price)	2020	80		System
"Alguém Como Tu" (with Agir)	2021	16		Non-album single(s)
"—" denotes a recording that did not chart or was not released in that territory.

==== As featured artist ====
List of singles as featured artist, with selected chart positions and certifications
Title	Year	Peak chart positions	Certifications	Album
Title	Year	POR	Certifications	Album
"Pensa Bem" (D.A.M.A featuring ProfJam)	2017	68	AFP: Platinum	Lado a Lado
"Havana" (SippinPurpp featuring ProfJam)	2019	68	—	3880
"Damn / Sky" (Lon3r Johny featuring ProfJam)	2020	18	—	Non-album single(s)
"—" denotes a recording that did not chart or was not released in that territory.

== Awards ==
Year	Award	Nominee	Category	Result
2019	PLAY - Portuguese Music Awards	"Água de Côco"	Best Videoclip	Nominated
2019	PLAY - Portuguese Music Awards	"Água de Côco"	Vodafone Best Song	Nominated
2019	MTV Europe Music Award	ProfJam	Best Portuguese Act	Nominated
2020	PLAY - Portuguese Music Awards	#FFFFFF	Best Album	Nominated
2020	PLAY - Portuguese Music Awards	"Hear From You" (featuring)	Best Videoclip	Won
2020	Fornova Melhores do Ano Awards	"Tou Bem (feat. Lhast)"	Best National Single	Nominated
2021	PLAY - Portuguese Music Awards	"Tribunal"	Vodafone Best Song	Nominated

== See also ==
- Think Music Records
- List of number-one singles of 2019 (Portugal)
- List of number-one albums of 2019 (Portugal)
