= Blaya =

Brazilian singer (born 1987)

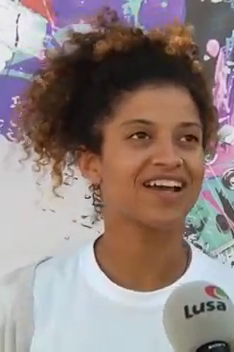

Background information
- Born: Karla Rodrigues; May 27, 1987 (age 38); Fortaleza, Ceará, Brazil
- Genres: Kuduro, Funk carioca, R&B, Bass music
- Occupations: Singer, dancer
- Years active: 2001–present
- Label: Warner Music

Karla Rodrigues (born May 27, 1987), known professionally as Blaya, is a Brazilian-born Portuguese singer and dancer.

== Career ==
Blaya started singing in 2001, but her professional career only began in 2008, after joining Buraka Som Sistema as a dancer, eventually becoming one of the group's vocalists. The partnership with the band lasted until 2016, after the group announced its hiatus for undetermined time. Before that, in 2013, Blaya released a free solo EP, the self-named Blaya. To promote the EP, she released the music video for "Superfresh", one of the EP's tracks, in December 2013.

After a period of dance teaching, Blaya returned to singing. In March 2018, she released her single "Faz Gostoso", which was a huge success in Portugal. "Faz Gostoso" was a top hit on the Portuguese charts and earned more than 24 million views on YouTube. The song was covered by American singer Madonna on her 2019 album Madame X. In September 2018, Blaya released two singles simultaneously, along with their respective music videos: "Má Vida" and "Vem na Vibe". In the same month, Portuguese TV station TVI premiered the telenovela Valor da Vida, and its opening song, "Tudo Passou", is sung by Blaya. "Tudo Passou" incorporates musical and lyric elements of Kaoma's hit single, "Lambada". The video was shot in Guimarães.

== Personal life ==
Although born in Brazil, she moved to Portugal when she was only two months old. Her father was a Brazilian football player who played for Amora FC. Blaya was raised in Ferreira do Alentejo before settling in the Greater Lisbon area.

In 2012, she publicly announced her bisexuality.

In July 2017 she gave birth to her first child, a girl named Aura Electra Rodrigues Russo.

== Discography ==
=== Singles ===
List of singles, with selected details and chart positions
| Title | Year | Peak chart positions | Album |
| Title | Year | POR | Album |
|---|---|---|---|
| "Faz Gostoso" | 2018 | 1 | Non-album single(s) |
| "Má Vida" | 2018 | — | Non-album single(s) |
| "Vem na Vibe" | 2018 | 46 | Non-album single(s) |
"—" denotes a recording that did not chart or was not released in that territory.

== Awards and nominations ==
| Year | Award | Category | Result |
|---|---|---|---|
| 2018 | MTV Europe Music Award | Best Portuguese Act | Nominated |
