= Boss AC =

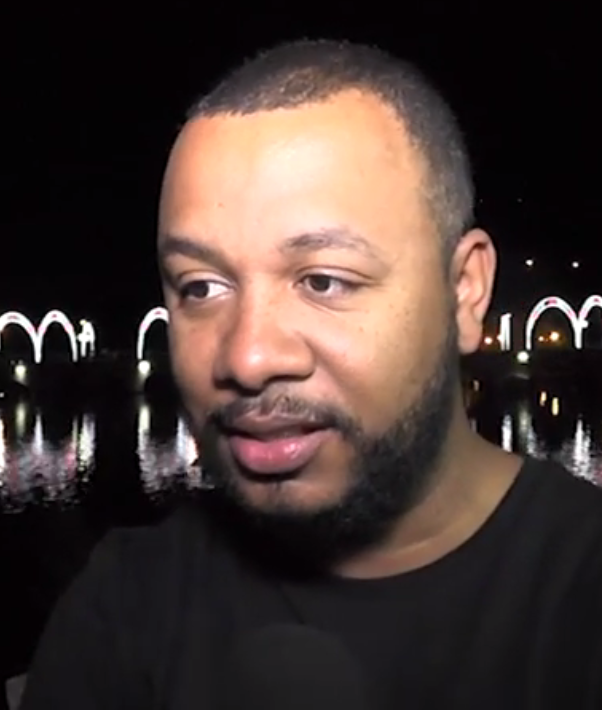
- Boss AC in 2016

Background information
- Born: Ângelo César do Rosario Firmino; January 20, 1975 (age 51); São Vicente, Cape Verde
- Origin: Lisbon, Portugal
- Genres: Rap, Hip hop Tuga
- Occupation: Rapper
- Years active: 1994-present
- Labels: Mandachuva, Hightower Productions, Absolute Audio, Universal Music
- Website: www.bossac.com

Ângelo César do Rosário Firmino, better known by the stage name Boss AC (born January 20, 1975) is a Portuguese rapper originally from Cape Verde. The letters A and C, in Boss AC, come from the initials of his two names, Ângelo and César, respectively.

== Career ==
His most popular songs include "Dinero", "Baza Baza", and "Doa a Quem Doer". Although he lives in Portugal, he spends a lot of his time in Africa, especially Angola. He has collaborated with many Angolan rappers, most notably pt:Gutto, with whom he worked on "Dinero".

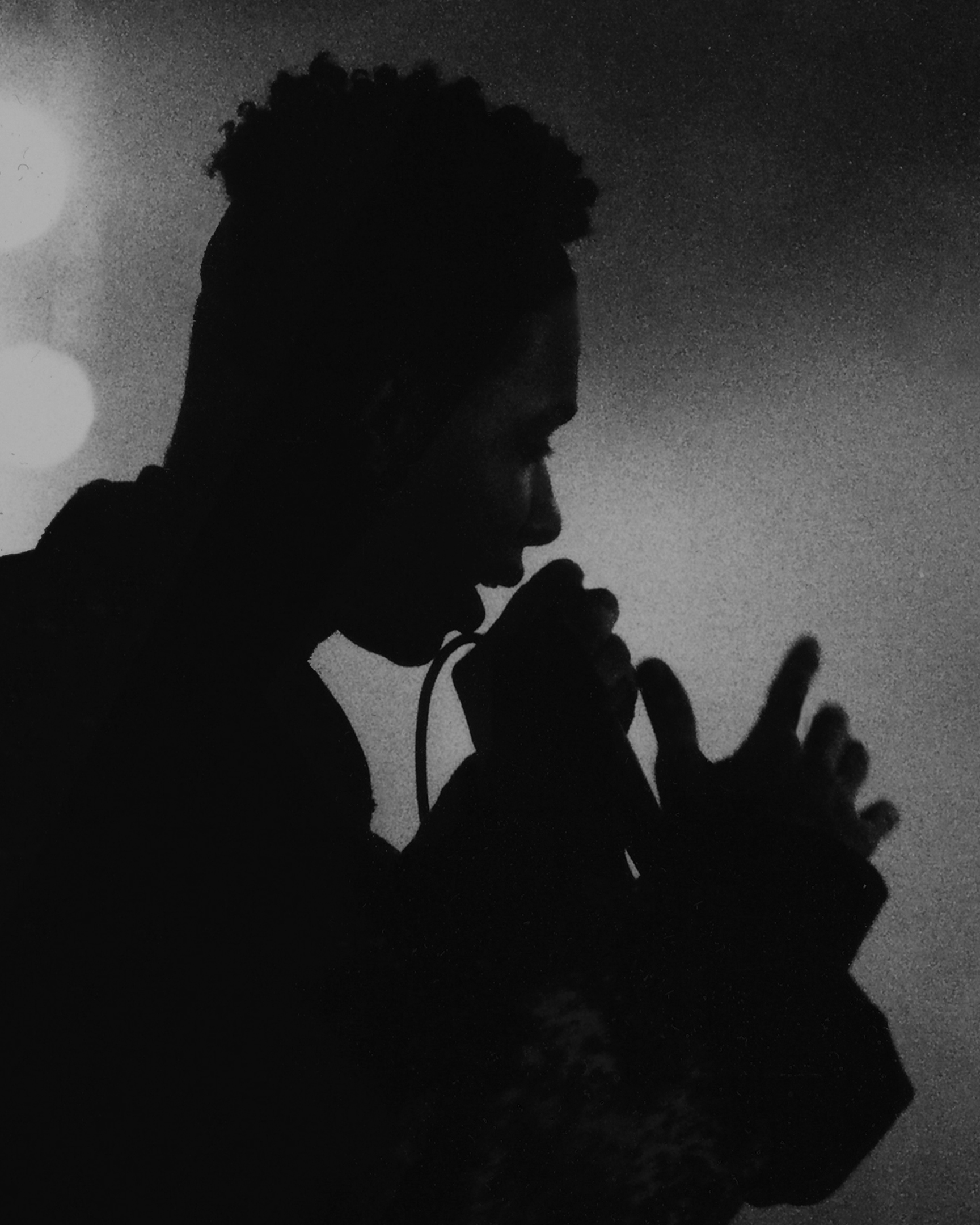
Lisbon-based Cape Verdean Portuguese rapper Boss AC performing in 1994.

Boss AC started his career in 1994 with Rapública, a compilation album that joined together the new faces of the Portuguese hip hop movement. He was both a performer and producer on this album.

In 1998, Boss AC recorded his first album, Mandachuva, in the USA with production by Troy Hightower. This album was a mixture of hip-hop, ragga, soul, R&B and African sounds. He also recorded a duet titled "No Stress" with Gutto. Together, they produced music and went on tour.

In 2002, Boss AC produced his second album, Rimar contra a maré, which was a more autobiographical album, entirely written and produced by him. This album continued the trend of adding African and Portuguese traditional sounds.

Boss AC's album, Ritmo, Amor e Palavras, was recorded in 2005. This album included collaborations with Posdnuos from De La Soul, Da Weasel, Sam the Kid and Pedro Ayres de Magalhães. The album earned Boss AC a nomination in the MTV Europe Music Awards for Best Portuguese Act.

His fifth fourth album Preto no Branco (Black on White) was released in January 2008 and features the single "Levanta-te" (Stand-up), its music video was launched on the Portuguese MTV later on 21 July. He participated with Mariza with the single "Alguém Me Ouviu (Mantém-te Firme).

His fifth album AC Para os Amigos (Nickname AC) was edited on 6 February 2012 and would be released by Universal Music, singles included in the album are "Sexta-feira (Emprego Bom Já)", "Tástabater" and "Tu Es Mais Forte". The first single was released in February 2012, it reached to Portuguese charts for 3 weeks and was in the Top 10 up to April. The second single's music video was filmed in Brazil. And the third single was released in August 2012 and featured a music video and features Shout. Boss AC was a guest star on the radio program "Comercial".

== Other ==
Boss AC has appeared in several music festivals in Cape Verde, one in his native island of São Vicente in the 2007, called Baía das Gatas Music Festival.

He was one of the participants for Seven Wonders of Portuguese Cooking on September 10, 2011 which decided 70 dish candidates to be one of seven to be its wonder.

== Discography ==
=== Albums ===
- 1998: Manda Chuva (Valentim de Carvalho (NorteSul))
- 2002: Rimar Contra a Maré (Valentim de Carvalho (NorteSul) - EMI)
- 2005: Ritmo, Amor e Palavras (Hightower Productions, Absolute Audio)
- 2009: Preto no Branco (Valentim de Carvalho (NorteSul) - EMI)
- 2012: AC Para os Amigos (Universal Music)
- 2018: Patrão

=== Singles ===
- "Anda cá ao Papá" (1998)
- "Quieres Dinero"
- "Baza Baza" (2002)
- "Hip Hop (Sou Eu E És Tu)" (2005)
- "Princesa" (2005)
- "Deixa Ferver"
- "Levanta-te" (Stand up) (2009)
- "Estou Vivo"
- "Acabou" (2009)
- "Sexta-Feira" (2012)

=== Collaborations, Performances and Special appearances ===
- "Rapública" Collection (1994) - singles: "A Verdade" and "Generate Power"
- "Pé Na Tchôn, Karapinha Na Céu" (1995) CD by General D - singles: "Atake dos Carapinhas" and "Jam Session"
- "Dou-lhe Com A Alma" (1995) CD, by Da Weasel - single: "Dou-lhe Com A Alma"
- "Espanta Espíritos" Collection (1995) - single: "Apenas Um Irmão"
- "Tá-se Bem" (1996) CD, by Kussondulola - single: "Terezinha"
- "Funky, Trunky, Punky" (1996) CD, by Gimba - single: "Executivo Improdutivo"
- "Filhos da Rua" (1997) CD, by Black Company - single: "Genuíno"
- "Ghetto Talk Part.2" (1997) mixtape, by DJ Bomberjack - a single
- "Todos Differentes, Todos Iguais" Collection (1997) - single: "Ménage à Trois"
- "Reencontro do Vinil Vol.1" (1998) mixtape, by DJ Bomberjack - a single
- "Invisível" ("Invisible") (1998) CD, by Fernando Cunha - single: "Só Há Tempo Agora"
- "Zona J - Banda Sonora" (1998) CD, single: "Anda Cá Ao Papá" and "Andam Aí"
- "Voar" (1999) CD, by Santos & Pecadores - single: "Saber De Ti"
- "XX Anos, XX Bandas" (1999) CD, by Xutos & Pontapés - version of "Não Sou o Único"
- "Tejo Beat" Collection (1998) - single: "It's All Right"
- "Volta a dar Cartas em 99" (1999) mixtape, by DJ Bomberjack - a single
- "Operação Alfa" (2000) CD, by SSP - single: "Every Woman"
- "Lena - Banda Sonora" (2001) CD, single: "Lena"
- "Freestyle Connexion" (Novembro/2002) mixtape, by DJ Bomberjack & DJ Lusitano - single (freestyle)
- "Private Show" (Outubro/2002) CD, by Gutto aka Bantú - single: "Hey (A Noite É Aqui)" and "Eu Imaginei"
- "Longa Caminhada" (2002) CD, by Mess - single: "Cum n' Get It"
- "Último Beijo - Banda Sonora" (2002) - temas "Bué de Rimas" e "A Carta Que Nunca Te Escrevi"
- Collection: "Nação Hip Hop - 10 Anos de rap em português" (May 2003) - single: "Velhos Tempos"
- Collection: "Hip Hop Nation #1" (June 2003) - single: "Mantém-te Firme"
- Collection: "Nação Hip-Hop 2005" (January 2005) - single: "Baza, Baza"
- Collection: "Hip Hop Nation #17" (February 2005) - single: "Quem Sente, Sente"
- Collection: "Nação Hip-Hop 2006" (March 2006) - single: "Hip Hop (Sou Eu e És Tu)"

=== As producer ===
- Collection: "Rapública" (1994) - sing: "A Verdade" and "Generate Power"
- Collection: "TPC" (2000) - song: "Lado a Lado (HipHop)"
