= Bizarra Locomotiva =

Portuguese industrial metal band

- Origin: Lisbon, Portugal
- Genres: Industrial metal; alternative metal
- Years active: 1993 – present
- Labels: Raging Planet; Rastilho Records
- Members: Rui Sidónio; Miguel Fonseca; Rui Berton; Alpha
- Past members: Armando Teixeira; Marco Franco; Ernesto Pinto; BJ
- Website: bizarralocomotiva.com

Bizarra Locomotiva is a Portuguese industrial metal band. Its history dates back to 1993, when Armando Teixeira (vocals and machinery) and Rui Sidónio (vocals) started a band to participate in Modern Music Competition of the city of Lisbon.

After participating in the Biennale of Young Creators of Mediterranean Europe, Bizarra Locomotiva went in a national tour. In August 1997, the band performed in Southwest Festival promoting Fear Now?. In Bestiário, 1998, the band highlights a wider musical range, welcoming new environments and sounds. In 2002, Homem Máquina, mankind once again was the subject of fierce criticism. The band members dressed in suits symbolizing the human machine. In 2004 the band released Ódio, a comeback to the raw and heavy sounds that were not at present in Homem Máquina and by that the arc of themed based records came to an end. After five years the band released Álbum Negro which gained attention from the media and had positive reviews, this record features Fernando Ribeiro from Moonspell as guest vocals in the song O Anjo Exilado. Years later, and touring with Álbum Negro the band completed its 20th anniversary, with a few shows to celebrate it and a video documentary. The album Mortuário came right after. Released in 2015, the band then toured around Portugal.

== Discography ==
- Bizarra Locomotiva, Simbiose Records, 1994.
- First Crime, Then Live, Simbiose Records, 1995.
- Fear Now?, Simbiose Records, 1996.
- Bestiário, Simbiose Records, 1998.
- "XX Anos XX Bandas", (Comp.) (tribute to Xutos & Pontapés) EMI Records, 1998
- Homem Máquina, Metrodiscos 2002.
- Ódio, Metrodiscos, 2004.
- Álbum Negro, Raging Planet, 2009.
- Mortuário, Rastilho Records, 2015
- Volutabro, Rastilho Records, 2023

== Current members ==
- Rui Sidónio - vocals
- Miguel Fonseca - guitars
- Alpha - synths and bass
- Rui Berton - drums

== Past members ==
- Armando Teixeira - vocals, samples
- Ernesto Pinto - drums
- Marco Franco - drums
- BJ - synths
