= Valete =

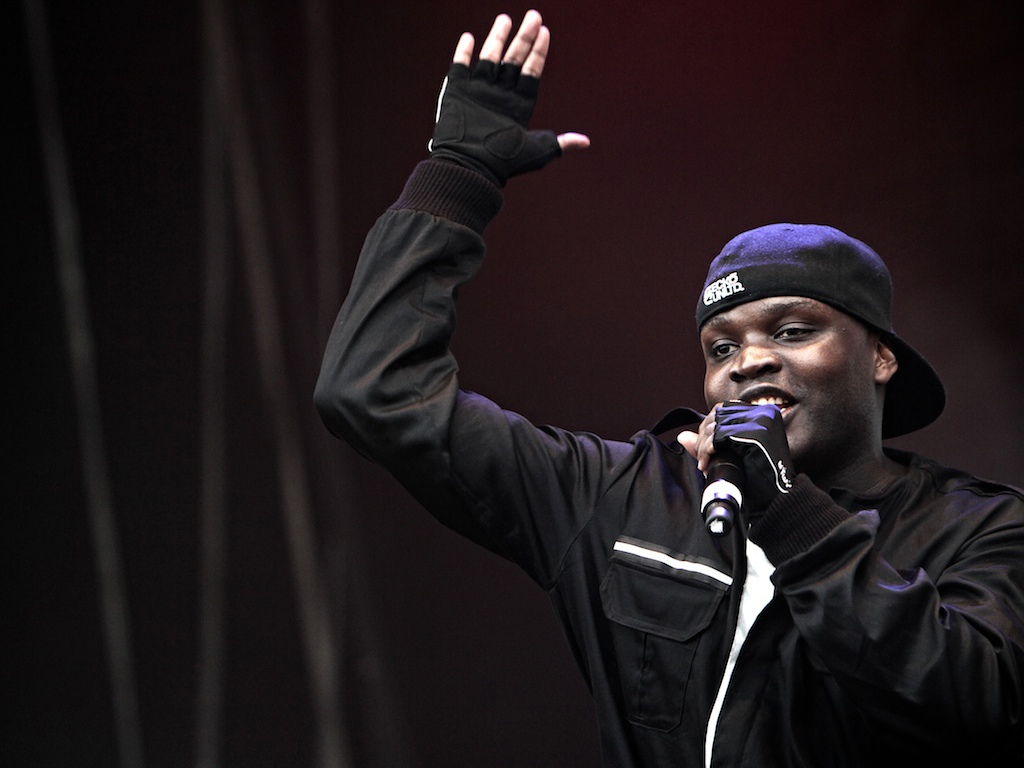
- Valete

Background information
- Born: November 14, 1981 (age 44); Lisbon, Portugal
- Genres: Hip hop, hip hop tuga, political hip hop
- Occupation: Rapper
- Years active: 1997-present
- Labels: Horizontal and Footmovin' Records
- Website: valeteoficial.com

Keidje Torres Lima, known professionally as Valete, is a Portuguese rapper and activist. In the duration of his career, he has become a staple of Portuguese hip-hop, being praised for the political message of his music.

== Life & music career ==
Valete was born in Lisbon to São Toméan parents, where he was raised in the Benfica neighborhood. He traveled to Arroja, returned to Benfica, then moved to Amadora and finally settled in Damaia. From a young age he developed strong political opinions, influenced by his philosophy teacher at school. During his youth he maintained relations with the Portuguese Communist Youth and the Portuguese Communist Party. However, in the same interview he admitted that despite being a party in which he identifies himself ideologically, he has issues its structure and social agendas. Thus, he prefers to embrace the Bloco de Esquerda, because it's closer to his political references. He began listening to rap music in 1991, later encountering such artists like Nas, Krs-one and Racionais MC's.

His career began in 1997 with Adamastor, when they created a group called Canal 115, and later getting signed by Horizontal Records. During that same year, and at sixteen years old, he started recording mix-tapes launched by DJs like Bomberjack and Cruzfader. He continued with Canal 115 for 2 more years constantly performing in Portugal but then decided to dedicate himself to his studies, getting a degree in communication sciences at the Universidade Independente.

In 2002 he returned with his album Educação Visual, launched independently and rejecting collaborations. Valete, who before this album was known for being a freestyle or battle MC, took on anti-capitalist overtone in his album. In the song "Anti-Herói", he defined himself as a "Trotskista belicista" (a bellicist Trotskist).

His second album Serviço Público was named as one of the best Portuguese hip hop albums of 2006 by the critics. It was selected as the second best national album by the listeners of the Hip hop radio show Suburbano on Coimbra's university radio, RUC.

A prominent hip hop critic, Rui Miguel Abreu, has called him the only political rapper in Portugal.

== Discography ==
=== Albums ===
- Educação Visual {Visual Education} 2002 - 5,000 copies sold in Portugal
- Serviço Público {Public Service} 2006 - 5,000 copies sold in Portugal

=== Collaborations ===
- Canal 115 project (Valete, Adamastor and Bónus)
- Sam the Kid "Pratica(mente)"
- Compilation "Nação Hip Hop" - 10 Anos de rap em português" {Hip Hop Nation - 10 years of rap in Portuguese} (May/2003) - song "Nossos Tempos"
- Compilation "Primeiro Kombate" {Combat First} (June/2003) - song "À Noite" (with Bónus)
- Compilation "Hip Hop Nation #1" (June/2003) - song "Ser Ou Não Ser" (with Bónus)
- Compilation "Hip Hop Nation #11" (June/2004) - song "Fim da Ditadura"
- Compilation "Poesia Urbana Vol.1" {Urban Poetry} (July/2004)
- Compilation "Nação Hip-Hop 2005" {Hip Hop Nation} (January/2005)
- Compilation "Hip Hop Nation #17" (February/2005) - collaborates in "Conexões"
- CD "Pratica(mente)" (December/2006) of Sam The Kid - collaborates in "Presta Atenção"
- Compilation "Adriano, Aqui e Agora - O Tributo" {Adriano, Here and Now - Tribute} (October/2007) - song "Menina dos Olhos Tristes"
- CD "Babalaze" (November/2007) of Azagaia - collaborates in song "Alternativos"
- CD "Na Linda Da Frente" (May/2010) of GPRO - collaborates in song "Karaboss Remix & G.P.R.O"
- CD "Diversidad" (Feb/2011) of Diversidad Experience

=== Mixtapes ===
- Mixtape "Reencontro do Vinil Vol. 1" (January/1998) of DJ Bomberjack - one song
- Mixtape "Reencontro do Vinil Vol. 2" (1998) of DJ Bomberjack - three songs
- Mixtape "Volta a Dar Cartas em 99" (1999) of DJ Bomberjack - collaborates in one song
- Mixtape "Freestyle Connexion" (November/2002) of DJ Bomberjack & DJ Lusitano - song "Duplo Sentido"
- Mixtape "Colisão Ibérica" em 00 de DJ Bomberjack - participa num tema
- Mixtape "Lisboa-Porto Connection" (1999) de DJ Cruzfader
- Mixtape "Tuga Mix" (1999) of DJ Cruzfader
