= Sam the Kid =

Portuguese rapper and music producer (born 1979)

Sam The Kid
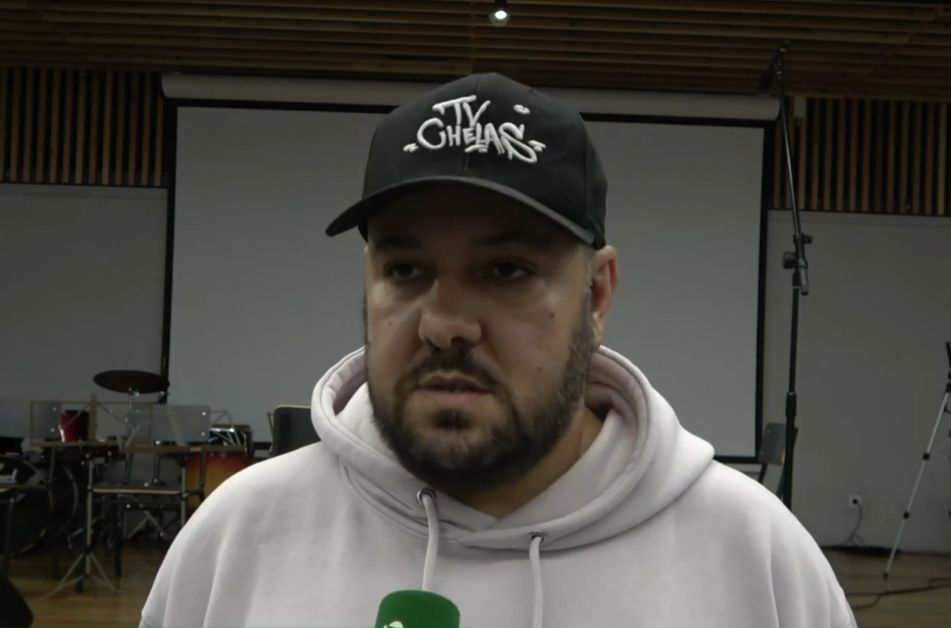
- Sam The Kid in 2024

Background information
- Born: Samuel Martins Torres Santiago Mira; 17 July 1979 (age 47)
- Origin: Chelas, Marvila, Lisbon, Portugal
- Genres: Hip Hop Tuga, political hip hop, freestyle rap (former), battle rap (former)
- Occupations: Rapper; singer; producer; songwriter; music video director; actor
- Instrument: MPC
- Years active: 1994–present
- Labels: Loop Recordings, EMI, Edel
- Member of: Orelha Negra
- Website: tvchelas.com

Samuel Martins Torres Santiago Mira (born 17 July 1979), better known by his stage name Sam the Kid, is a Portuguese rapper and producer from Chelas, in the civil parish of Marvila, Lisbon.

Sam the Kid has been cited as one of the biggest names of rap in Portugal, and his legendary status led him to produce the football anthem for the Portugal national squad in FIFA World Cup 2026.

== Early life ==
Sam the Kid's music was primarily influenced by 93 'til Infinity (1993). Sam the Kid's music is noted for a creative and extensive use on sampling, using his primary producing equipment, the MPC. In 1994, after leaving secondary school Escola Secundária D. Dinis in Lisbon at 15 years old, Mira established his first group, "Official Nasty" with school-friends Daddy-O-Pop, 2 Much and Sheriff, appearing in three concerts before dissolving in 1996, though they were still performing informally around 2004/2005.

== Music career ==
Sam the Kid released his first album Entre(tanto) in 1998. His second album Sobre(tudo), released in 2001, attracted the attention of then recently created Loop Recordings, who offered him a contract.The album featured the song "Não Percebes", one of the biggest Portuguese rap hits, that touched on the issue of the "us vs. them" mentality in the genre. It was in 2002, with the release of his third album, an instrumental record called Beats Vol. 1: Amor, that Sam the Kid began to enjoy a significant level of success; the album was considered by fans and critics to be one of the greatest Portuguese releases of the year.

In 2006, the artist released Pratica(mente), an album praised by critics as one of the most ambitious of the genre made in the country, a record that is still well remembered by fans.

Sam the Kid is considered to be one of the most important names of Portuguese hip hop, and one of the "most historic participants and drivers" of the genre in the country. In 2008, the musician was nominated for the second time for the MTV Europe Music Awards, along with Rita Redshoes, Buraka Som Sistema, Vicious Five and Slimmy. The artist was featured in a documentary named "Dicas do Vinil, com Sam The Kid", a work produced by public service broadcasting channel RTP.

The artist has been noted for taking a "radically open and eclectic" approach on his efforts to expand his audience, as well as refusing to sing in English, as did many of his contemporaries, when trying to break into more profitable markets. Sam started a new project named TV Chelas, a YouTube platform dedicated to Portuguese hip hop. The channel publishes content such as uncompleted music by Sam and other artists, podcasts, interviews and archived material, being one of the many new vehicles of promotion and critique of Portuguese-made hip hop, R&B and electronic music in the country.

=== Orelha Negra ===
Since 2009 Sam The Kid is part of the band Orelha Negra, where is plays synths and voice samples using MPC. The other band members are Francisco Rebelo (bass and guitar), Fred Ferreira (drums), João Gomes (keyboards and synths) and DJ Cruzfader (turntables).

Orelha Negra have released 3 studio albums and 2 mixtapes.

=== É Tuga Ou Nada ===
Sam The Kid was called by the Federation of Portugal of Football to produce a football anthem for the Portuguese national football men squad to support their campaign at the FIFA World Cup 2026, captained by star Cristiano Ronaldo.

Upon accepting, instead of producing a song that would try to appeal to most, he chose to captain his music style and produced a Hip Hop anthem. Instead of himself rapping on the song, Sam The Kid chose to just produce it and call other rapper friends that are associated with football, such as Bispo, Gson (of band Wet Bed Gang), Sir Scratch and Papillon. The song is recorded by Fred Ferreira, mix and mastered by Here's Johnny while the song is published by FADED and distributed by Universal Music Portugal.

On 19 May 2026 the song was released in a press conference, similar to a football press conference, with the name "É Tuga Ou Nada", a wordplay twist from the Portuguese classical expression "é tudo ou nada".

== Discography ==
=== Studio albums ===
Year	Title	Details	Ref(s)
1999	Entre(tanto)	Debut studio album	
2002	Sobre(tudo)	Second studio album	
2002	Beats Vol 1: Amor	Instrumental/concept album	
2006	Pratica(mente)	Landmark Portuguese hip-hop album	
2020	Caixa de Ritmos	Return to solo work	
2022	Caixa de Ritmos 2	Follow-up to 2020 album	
2023	Quarto Mágico	Latest full studio album	

=== Collaborative albums ===
Year	Title	Collaborator(s)	Ref(s)
2021	Um Café e a Conta	Valete	

=== Production & compilation albums ===
Year	Title	Role	Ref(s)
2004	Poesia Urbana Vol. 1	Producer/Performer	

=== Selected singles ===
Year	Title	Album	Ref(s)
1999	"Lágrimas"	Entre(tanto)	
2002	"Não Percebes"	Sobre(tudo)	

=== Guest appearances ===
Year	Song	Artist	Album/Project	Ref(s)
2002	"Pimbas"	Regula featuring Sam The Kid	1ª Jornada	

== See also ==
- Music of Portugal
- Hip hop Tuga

== Sources ==
- Nitzsche, Sina A.; Grunzweig, Walter (2013). Hip-Hop in Europe: Cultural Identities and Transnational Flows (Transnational and Transatlantic American Studies). Zurich: LIT Verlag. ISBN 978-3-643-90413-3.
- Rodrigues, Teresa Palma (2012). "Chelas, o "sítio": o lugar como referência na identidade e na obra de Sam The Kid" (PDF). Estúdio : Artistas Sobre Outras Obras (in Portuguese). Vol. 3. Revista:Estúdio. pp. 66–73. ISSN 1647-6158.
- Fradique, Teresa (2015). "Le rappeur et les "petites grand-mères":Deux ethnographies du cosmopolitisme comme médiation" [The rapper and the "little grandmothers": Two ethnographies of cosmopolitanism as mediation] (PDF) (in French).
