= Da Weasel =

Portuguese hip hop band

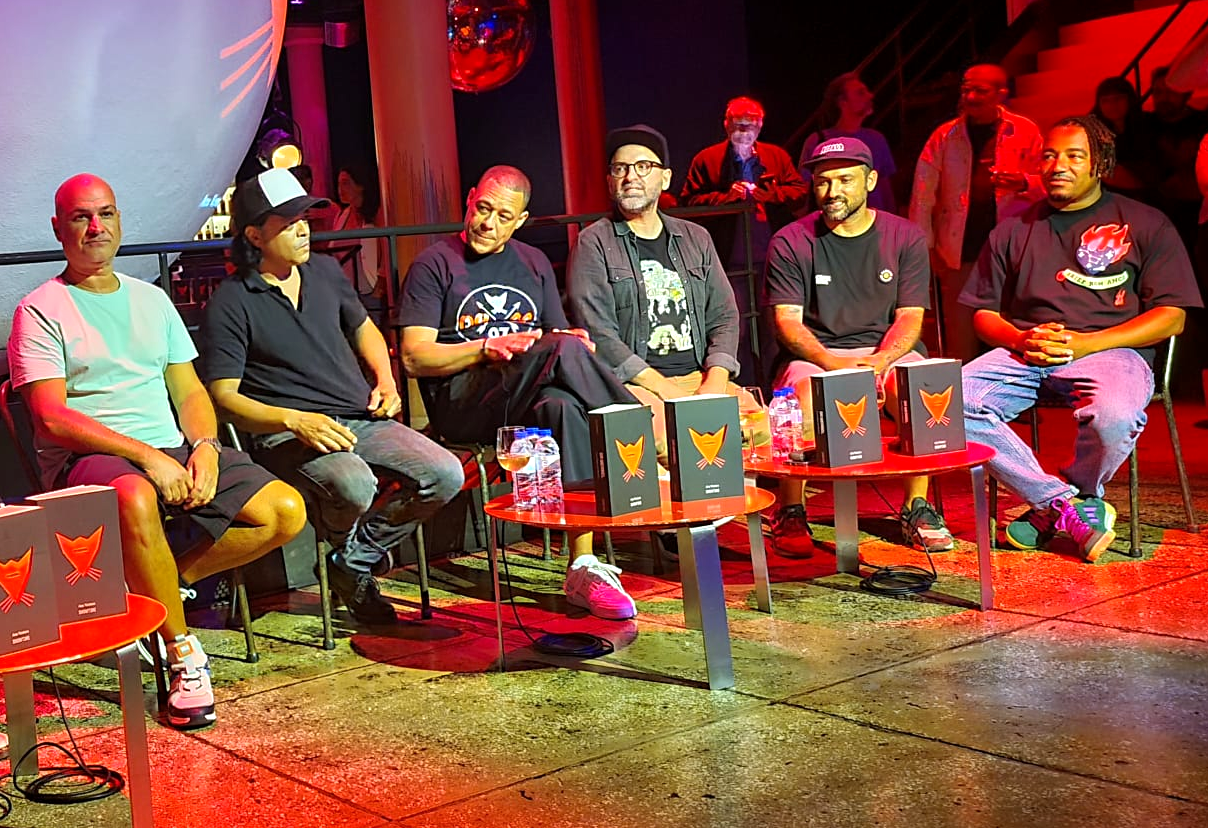
- Da Weasel in 2023

Background information
- Origin: Almada, Portugal
- Genres: Hip hop; rap rock
- Years active: 1993–2010, 2020–present (only shows)
- Labels: EMI
- Members: Miguel Negretti (Dj Glue); Carlos Nobre (Pacman/Carlão); João Nobre (Jay-Jay Neige); Pedro Quaresma (Quakas); Bruno Silva (Virgul); Guilherme Silva (Guillaz)
- Past members: Yen Sung, Armando Teixeira; João Fagulha
- Website: da-weasel.net

Da Weasel are a Portuguese hip hop and rap rock band from Almada, fronted by MCs Pacman (now known as Carlão) and Virgul. They are one of the oldest hip-hop projects in Portugal, having been formed in 1993 and terminated in 2010, and known for being a full session band, instead of relying on a DJ and samples. The band announced their reunion in 2019. Their music uses elements from hard rock, pop and ska.

== Career ==
Da Weasel's first release was the EP More Than 30 Motherfuckers, featuring only six songs, all in English. The group featured Pacman as the MC, Pedro Quaresma, Jay Jay Neige, Guilherme Silva and João Fagulha on live instruments, Yen Sung as backup vocalist and Armando Teixeira as DJ and producer. The following year, in 1994, the band rode the wave of the Rapública compilation, which presented Portuguese hip-hop to the mainstream audience, by releasing their first full album, Dou-lhe Com A Alma. This time, the band wrote all the songs in Portuguese, incorporating influences derived from Cypress Hill and Public Enemy.

Before production of their third release (3º Capítulo) in 1997, Yen Sung left the band to start a career as an acid jazz producer, as well as DJing. She was replaced by Virgul, a rapper/singer which introduced a few ragga and afro elements to the band's sound, as was seen in the singles "Todagente" and "Duia", with Virgul imposing his personality without outshining main MC Pacman. Da Weasel also went on tour for the first time.

In 1999, after taking part in Mario Caldato Jr.'s Tejo Beat compilation and the Xutos & Pontapés tribute album XX Anos – XX Bandas, Da Weasel went back to the studio to record their fourth album, Iniciação A Uma Vida Banal – O Manual. The critically acclaimed album was the band's first silver record, and helped increase their previous release sales enough to grant them a second silver. Da Weasel also served as an opening act to Red Hot Chili Peppers' concert at the Atlantic Pavilion in Lisbon.

Armando Teixeira then left the band to pursue a solo career, and experienced pop-rock producer Mário Barreiros helmed the recording of Podes Fugir Mas Não Te Podes Esconder in 2001. Da Weasel's work now blended influences from hip-hop, heavy metal, reggae and African music to produce a unique sound that was still undeniably Portuguese. Paris-based Cuban hip-hop trio Orishas was featured on the album. Podes Fugir... soon rose up to gold and later platinum record sales.

In 2004, Mário Barreiros was replaced by João Martins as producer, and DJ Glue joined the band as live DJ, filling a spot vacant for three years. They helped Da Weasel reinvent themselves on their latest album, Re-Definições, a deeply thought-out piece of work which refined the sound heard in the previous album. Music fans responded enthusiastically, with over 80,000 copies sold, making it Da Weasel's best selling album.

In 2005 the band played a sold-out concert at the Olympia in Paris, its first ever big international performance.

In 2006 Da Weasel publishes a Track named "Play Up" inspired by the statement of Bob Marley: "Football is Music" which expresses their passion for football. The track is found exclusively on the CD PlayUp, among 15 other football tracks written by various artists.

On 2 April 2007, Da Weasel released their latest album entitled Amor, Escárnio e Maldizer. It reached platinum status on the same day, with over 20,000 copies sold.

The band sang a song called Nigga on Gato Fedorento's last episode of the season Diz Que É Uma Espécie de Magazine. They were before presented with a Gato Fedorento's audio sketch, "Nigga, Tu És Nigga, Nigga?" ("Nigga, Are You Nigga, Nigga?"), and they quoted part of the sketch.

On 9 December 2010, Da Weasel announced the band's breakup.

On 13 July 2019, It was announced that Da Weasel would be reuniting for an exclusive concert on 11 July 2020 in the NOS Alive festival, in Portugal. The reunion was then postponed to 2022, after the cancellation of the 2020 and 2021 editions of the festival, due to the COVID-19 pandemic.

== Discography ==
=== Studio albums ===
- Dou-lhe Com A Alma (1995)
- 3º Capítulo (1997)
- Iniciação A Uma Vida Banal – O Manual (1999)
- Podes Fugir Mas Não Te Podes Esconder (2001)
- Re-Definições (2004)
- Amor, Escárnio e Maldizer (2007)

=== Extended plays ===
- More Than 30 Motherf*****s (1994)

=== Live albums ===
- Ao Vivo Coliseus (2005)
- Ao Vivo no Pavilhão Atlântico (2008)

== Awards ==
After a nomination for Best Breakthrough Act in the Blitz Music Awards (organized by the Blitz music newspaper) with their first album in 1993, Da Weasel won the newspapers' Band of the Year award with Dou-lhe Com A Alma in 1994. From their third album, 3º Capítulo, the single "Todagente" yielded a Best Song award in 1997.

In 2005, the band won the awards for Best Song, Best Portuguese Act and Best R&B/Hip Hop in the regional radio Rádio Nova Era's Melhores do Ano (Best of the Year) awards with their 2004 hit single "Re-tratamento".

Da Weasel won the awards for Best Group and Best Song - with "Re-tratamento" - in the 2005 edition of the Portuguese Golden Globes awards. They would win the Golden Globe for Best Group once again in 2008, with their 2007 album Amor, Escárnio e Maldizer. They were also nominated for Best Group in 2009, with their live album Ao Vivo no Pavilhão Atlântico, which was recorded in Pavilhão Atlântico arena in November of 2007.

Da Weasel won the MTV Europe Music Award for Best Portuguese Act twice: in 2004 and 2007. They were also nominated for the same award in 2005. Da Weasel is the only duo or group that won the MTV EMA for Best Portuguese Act more than once.
