= Ithaka (artist) =

American multidisciplinary artist from California

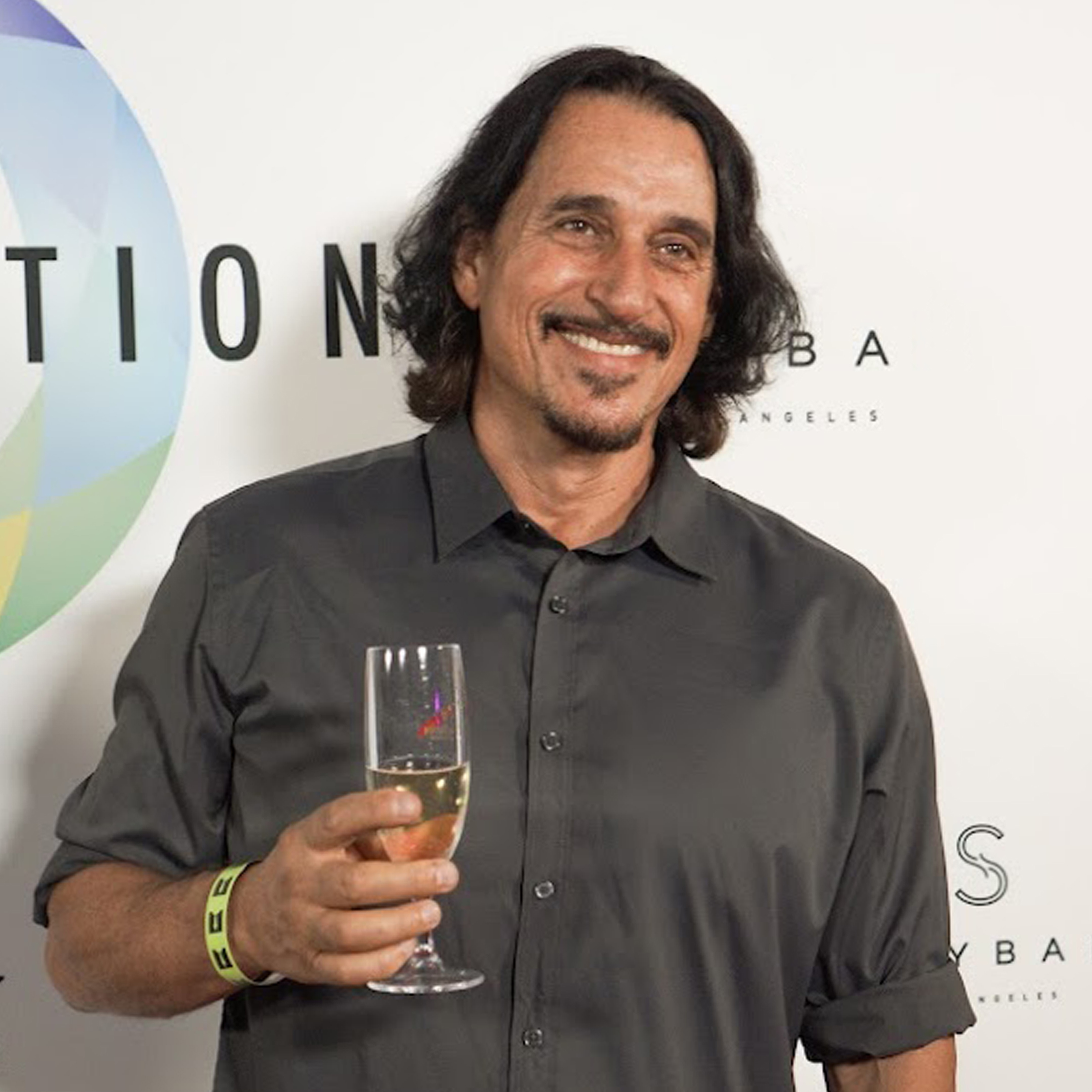
- Ithaka in 2024

Background information
- Also known as: Ith, Korvorão, Korvorowng (sometimes misspelled as Korvowrong)
- Born: Ithaka Darin Pappas; July 8, 1966 (age 60); Anaheim, California, U.S.
- Origin: Southern California, U.S.
- Genres: Alternative hip hop, hip hop tuga, trip hop, spoken word, electronic dance music
- Occupations: Vocalist, lyricist, poet, contemporary artist, writer, photographer, producer
- Years active: 1983–present
- Labels: Sweatlodge Records, Valentim de Carvalho (Parlophone/Warner Music Group), Publishing administered by: North Music Group

Ithaka Darin Pappas (born July 8, 1966), known professionally as Ithaka, is an American-born multidisciplinary artist of Greek ancestry. He is the lyricist and vocalist of the rock song Seabra Is Mad, the underground hip hop track Escape From The City Of Angels (featuring Marta Dias, and the spoken-word poem So Get Up (one of the most remixed vocal a capellas in electronic music history). His sculpture series The Reincarnation of a Surfboard has been exhibited globally, his early archival photographic work of NWA has been published in the book Contact High: A Visual History of Hip-Hop and been included in the project's international exhibition series at venues such as the International Center of Photography in New York.

The artist creates using music, writing, sculpture and photography (both as separate entities or using them in combination with each other). He has authored a collection of poems and short stories, entitled Ravenshark Chronicles published in international magazines and periodicals, which have sometimes been the basis for his travel-oriented lyrical content. In 2025, Expresso newspaper stated that Ithaka's lyrics Forget the past, go outside, have a blast are words that, at one point in the 90s, had as much impact around the world as Timothy Leary's famous expression: Turn on, tune in, drop out. In a 2005 article for the magazine Waves, journalist Ricardo Macario described Ithaka as "The Miscellaneous Man". In a 2008 review of Ithaka's sixth album Saltwater Nomad, the online surf-culture platform Surfline stated that "the artist effortlessly traverses at ease between all of his choses mediums of expression [music, sculpture, writing and photography]", and that "his life's journey is a soulful balancing act somewhere between the worlds of euphoric creation and aquatic diversion."

== Early life ==
Ithaka was born and raised in coastal Southern California, and began experimenting with his father's 35mm and 120mm cameras at the age of five. He began surfing at the age of twelve, after vacationing with a friend's family on the Hawaiian island of Maui and observing the locals riding six-foot tubes at Honolua Bay. “That's the life for me”, he thought to himself. Upon returning to California, he sold his drum kit to buy a surfboard. The ocean, until present day, has been a major influence for the artist. As a young adult he began traveling the world in search of waves and adventure, largely inspiring his photography, three-dimensional artworks and voyage-oriented lyrics and stories. As he told Dance Club Magazine in a 2005 interview, I live it, write it, rap about it. He has since resided and worked in a variety of locations including; Greece, Japan, Portugal, Brazil and Mexico.

== Career ==
=== Music ===
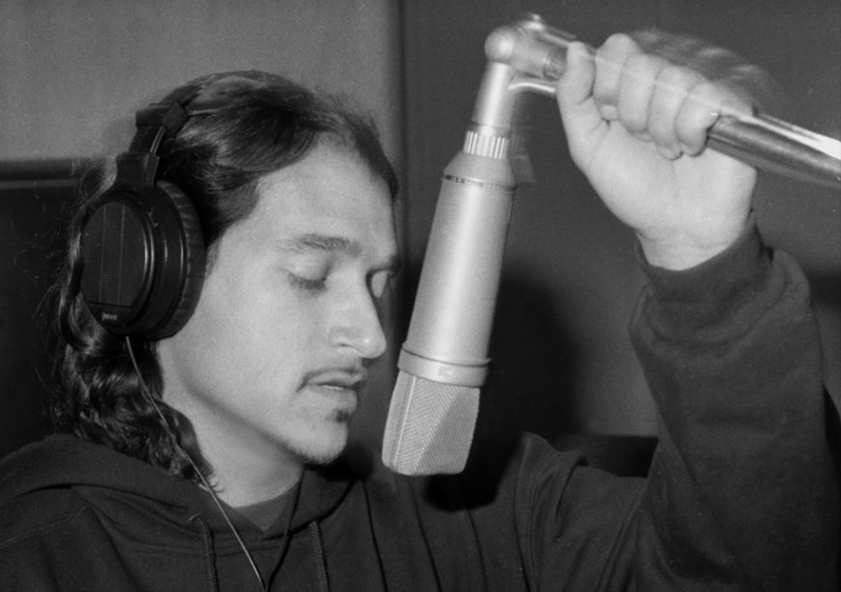
Ithaka recording "Seabra Is Mad" at Valentim de Carvalho studios in Lisbon, Portugal (1997)

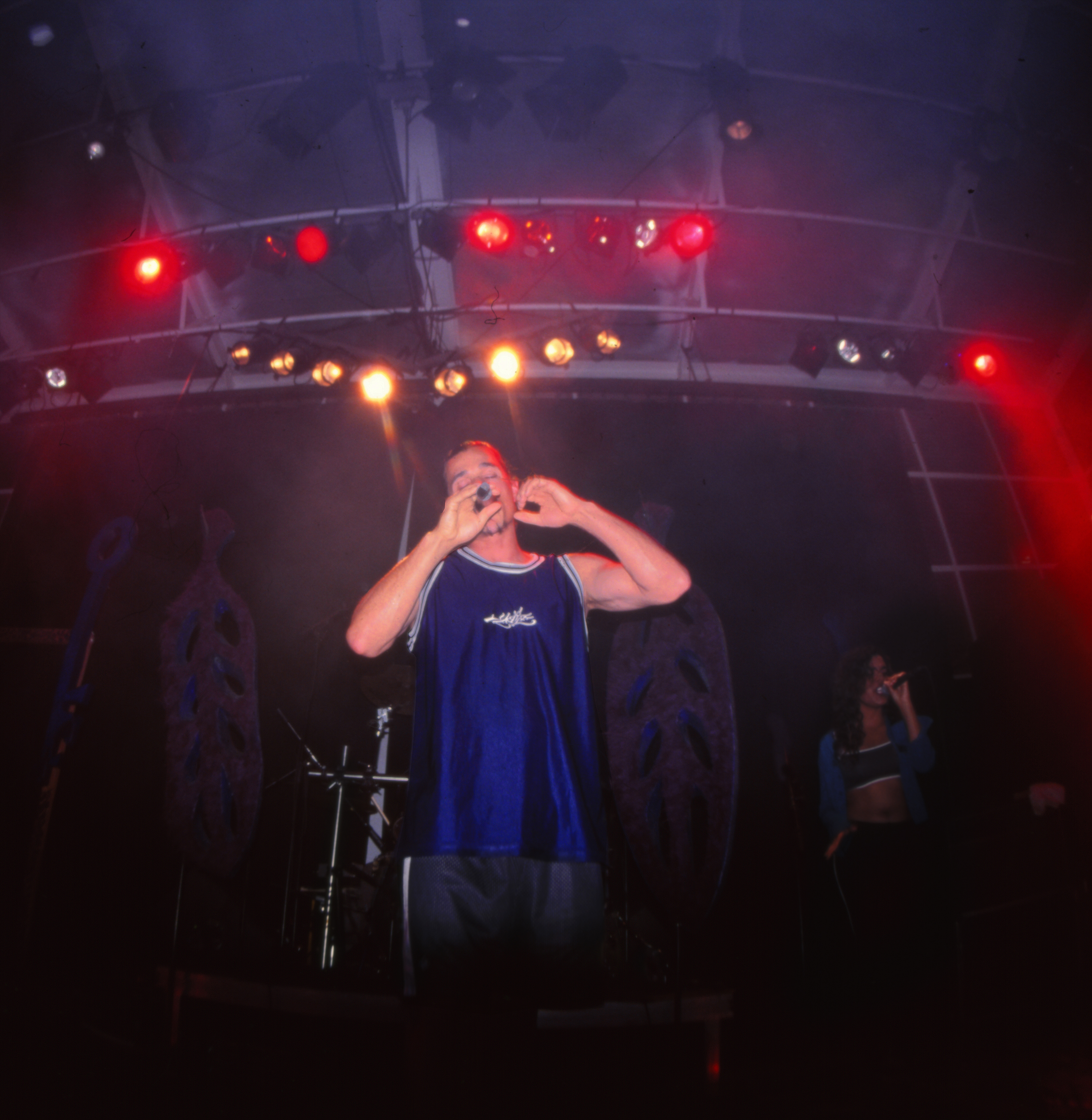
Ithaka performing at the Expo '98 in Lisbon

As an audio artist, Ithaka has recorded seven albums of alternative hip hop and spoken-word music. His 1992 spoken-word song So Get Up, under varying titles, has charted on four separate occasions in Europe and the UK and has been remixed by artists such as Fatboy Slim and Cosmic Gate.

Although a citizen of the United States who vocalizes in English, because Ithaka was living and recording in Portugal for several years during the mid-late 1990s, at the very beginning of the hip hop movement in the country, he is often included in the genre of music known as Hip hop tuga and sometimes considered one of the founding artists along with: Black Company, Boss AC, Zona Dread, Family, Funky D, New Tribe, Lideres da Nova Mensagem, Da Weasel, Mind Da Gap, and General D.

Escape From The City Of Angels, an alternative hip hop song Ithaka recorded with guest vocalist Marta Dias for his album Flowers and the Color of Paint was featured in the soundtrack of Antoine Fuqua's 1998 feature film Replacement Killers (Columbia Pictures) in a scene featuring Academy Award nominees/winners Mira Sorvino, Chow Yun-fat and Clifton Collins Jr.

During his most active recording years in Portugal (1994–1997), the artist's musical projects were nominated for a total of nine Pemios Blitz (the Portuguese Grammy Awards) including; Best Album (for Flowers and the Color of Paint in 1995 and Stellafly in 1997) and Best Male Vocalist (in 1995 and 1997). In addition, the national newspaper, Público, awarded his 1997 release Stellafly as "Album Of The Year" and considered a song from the record Seabra Is Mad (musically co-written by Ewan Butler and Joe Fossard) as both the "Song Of The Year" and "Video Of The Year". Público also cited his debut release Flowers And The Color Of Paint as one of the country's Ten Most Influential Albums Of The 1990s, while a 2020 article in Rua Magazine proclaimed that Flowers And The Color Of Paint was one of the twenty albums that changed the Portuguese music industry.

=== Sculpture ===
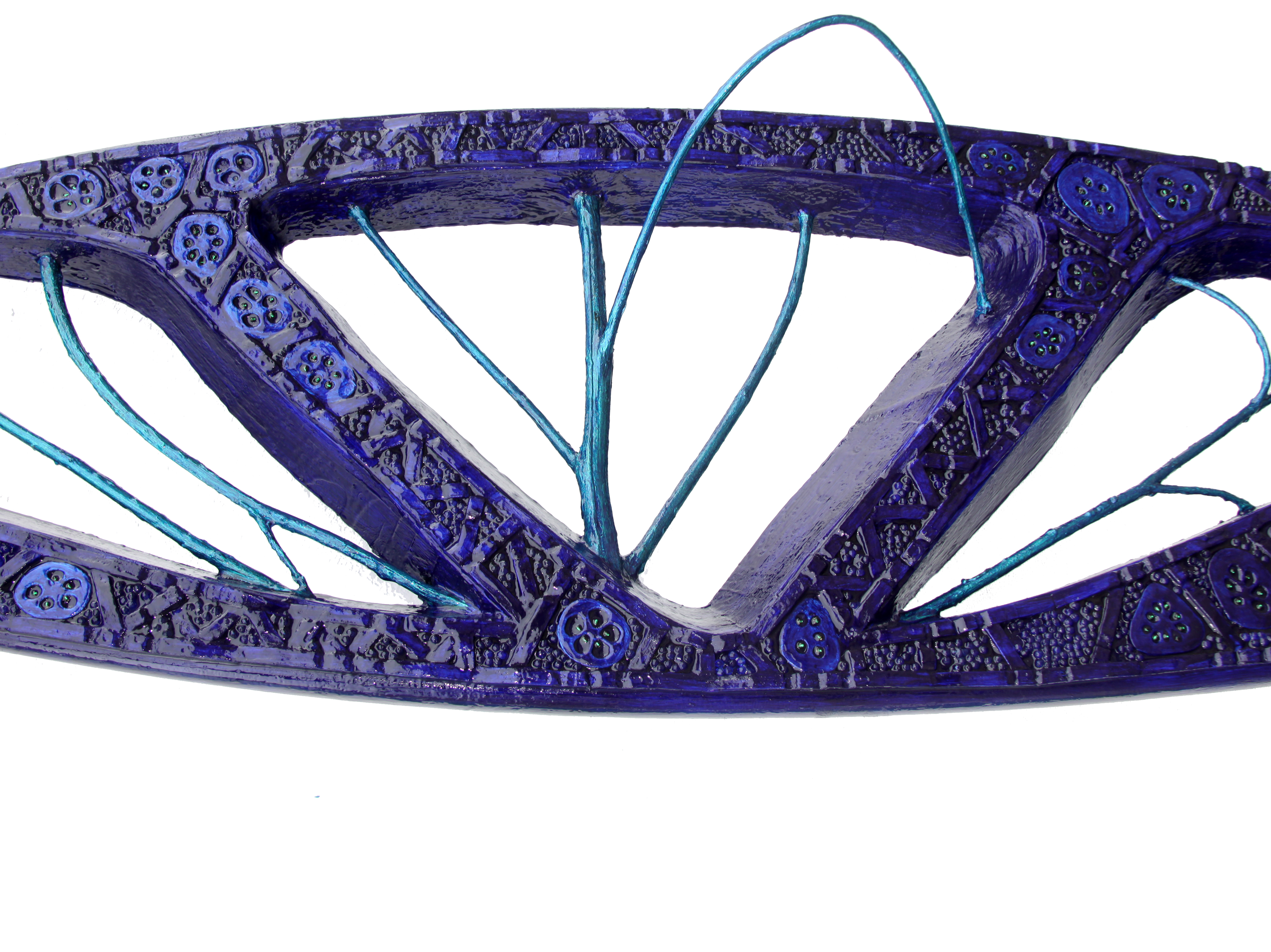
"Amanari", a reincarnated surfboard sculpture by Ithaka from the series "Jurema" (2009)

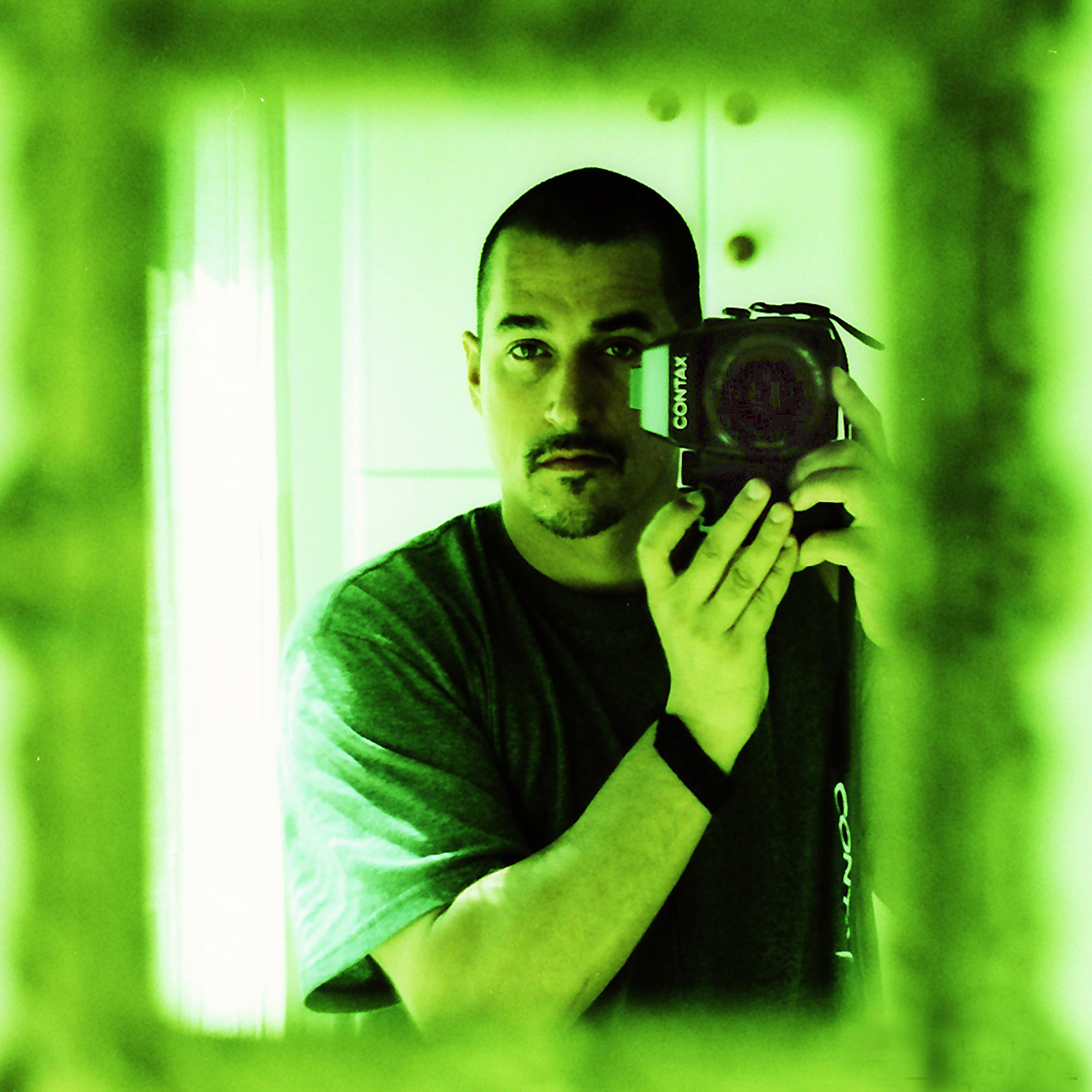
Ithaka in 2001

The ongoing sculpture series entitled The Reincarnation Of A Surfboard which Ithaka began in 1989 (which includes over 300 individual contemporary artworks created from recycled surfboards) has been exhibited in Europe, Asia, the United States and also in Brazil, at São Paulo Museum of Image and Sound. In an interview given to Surf Portugal magazine in 2012 while attending one of Ithaka's exhibitions in Europe, graphic artist Dave Carson described Ithaka's work as experimental, unexpected and surprising and in a 2013 report about his work, FUEL TV considered him one of the world's premier contemporary surf artists.

=== Photography ===
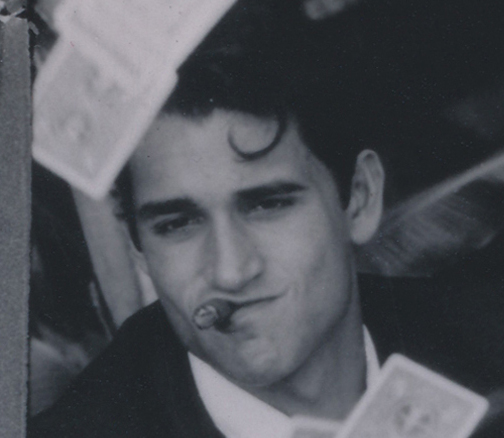
Ithaka in 1985

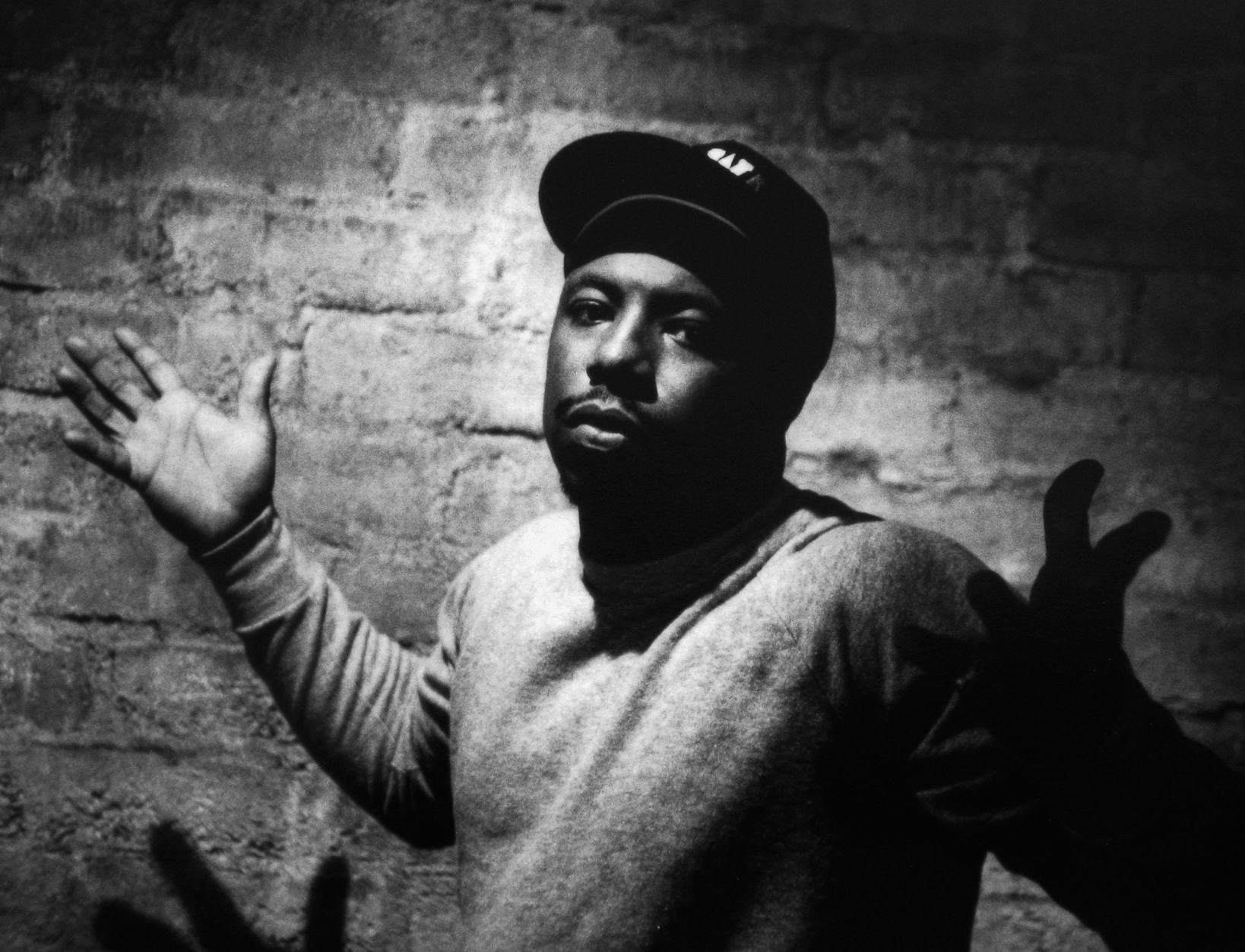
WC of the group Low Profile photographed by Ithaka in 1989

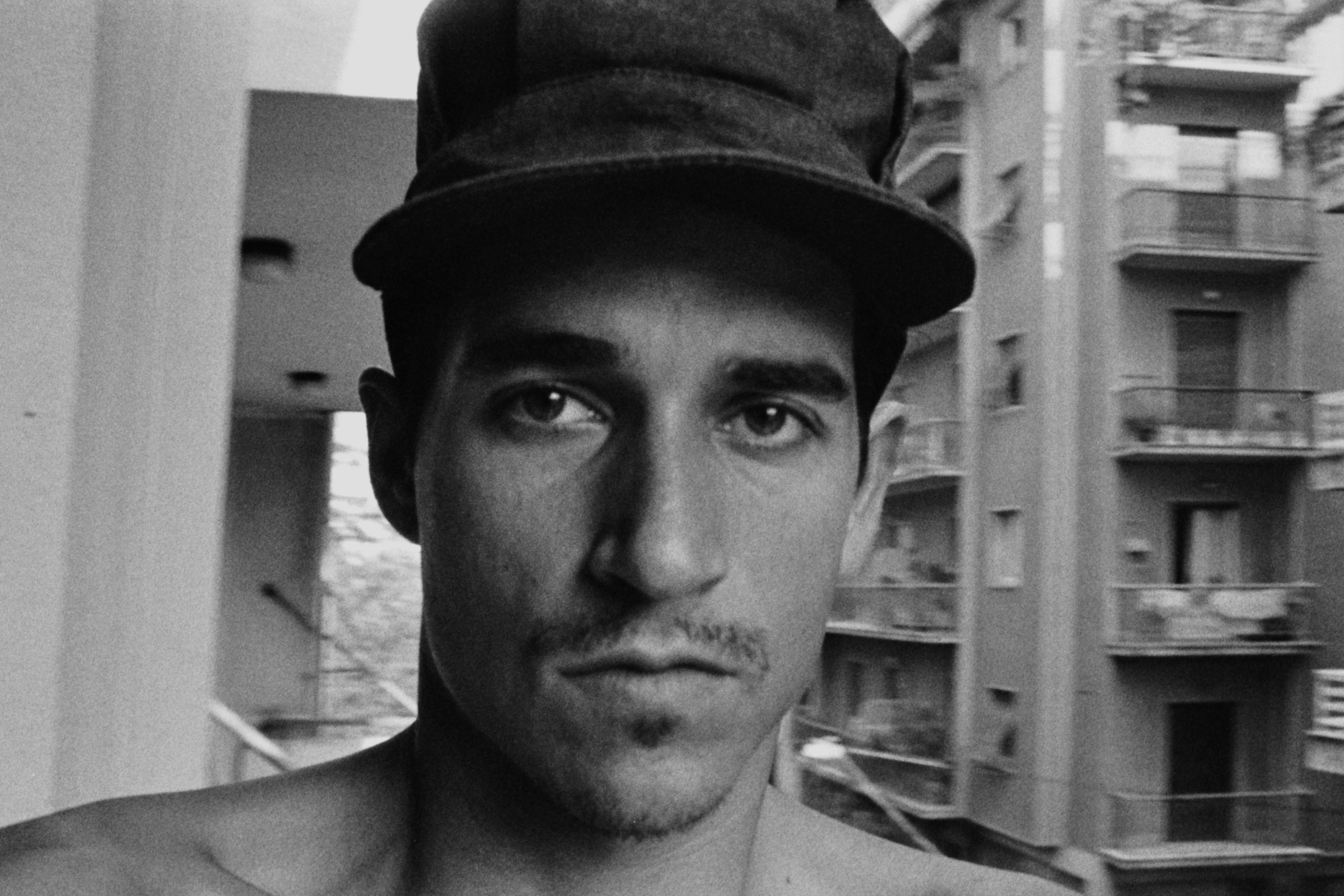
Ithaka in 1991

Ithaka's first professional photograph was published in 1984, in Thrasher skateboarding magazine. Much of his early portraiture work was of aspiring Hollywood actors, but he then began getting more involved in music industry photography, working with Los Angeles area hip hop artists such as; A Lighter Shade of Brown, Big Lady K, Low Profile, Eazy-E and N.W.A.

After the release of F. Gary Gray's 2015 biographical drama about gangsta rap pioneers Eazy-E and N.W.A., entitled Straight Outta Compton, there was renewed visibility in some of the early pictures that Ithaka Darin Pappas had made of the artists (all created while freelancing for Priority Records between 1988 and 1990). In 2016, many of his photographs, including the cover of their 1989 Straight Outta Compton remix single release, were projected as a backdrop at Barclays Center in Brooklyn, New York during the induction ceremony officially admitting N.W.A into the Rock and Roll Hall of Fame. In 2017, more photographs appeared in the HBO documentary, The Defiant Ones directed by Allen Hughes. Other photographs of N.W.A. by Ithaka were shown in the 2018 museum exhibition "Hip-Hop : Un Age d'Or" (or The Golden Age Of Hip Hop) at the Musée d'Art Contemporain in Marseille, France and in the 2025 Ice Cold. A Hip-Hop Jewelry History (exhibition) hosted by the American Museum of Natural History in New York City.

Later in 2018, photographs of Eazy-E riding a skateboard in Venice Beach, California that Ithaka had taken in 1989 were published in the photography book Contact High: A Visual History of Hip-Hop (written by Vikki Tobak). The book, published by Penguin Random House, was included on Time Magazine's 25 Best Photobooks of 2018 list. Ithaka's images from the book have also been present in its subsequent traveling photography exhibition series that to date has shown at The Annenberg Space for Photography in Los Angeles (2019), International Center of Photography in New York (2020) and at Manarat Al Saadiyat Museum in Abu Dhabi, United Arab Emirates (2021). Other early photographs of Eazy E and N.W.A. by Ithaka have been manufactured into apparel by companies such as Neighborhood (Japan), Bravado, MadeWorn, Merch Traffic and others.

=== Writings ===
During the mid-1990s until the mid-2000s, writings from Ithaka's collection of ocean-related short story series entitled, ‘’Ravenshark Chronicles’’ (including titles such as "Zé dos Cães") were published in the surfing magazines; Surfer, The Surfer's Journal, Wavelength (UK), Transworld Surf and Water Magazine. In 2009, one of the stories, “Miracle At Malibu”, was published in the collective hardbound book, Surf Story. In recent years these stories have also been published individually as mini-novels.

=== On Camera, Voice-Over, Theater ===
Since his late teens, Ithaka has sporadically been involved with film, television, voice-over and theater. In 1986, he appeared as "David" in a theater production of George Axelrod's "Goodbye Charlie" (that also featured former NFL player turned actor Russ Bolinger in the role of "Andre"). In 1987, he appeared as "Gerhardt" in the Thomas Heggen play Mr. Roberts (directed by Mark Majarian), alongside of TV star Martin Milner (of Adam-12).

In 1991, he starred in a Levi's television commercial directed by David Fincher and also appeared in, and did the voice-over for, a Texaco commercial, produced by Mithun Agency.

He has starred in two short films, "Welcome to Bingo" directed by Ted Crittenden and "The Waiting Room" directed by Orson Ford.

He was the narrator for the 2023 art documentary, To the Ones That Craft Their Dreams directed by Gonçalo Leandro (Hexagano Films).

In 2026, Ithaka appeared in “Ándale,” an episode of Sam Levinson's Euphoria(produced by HBO Max. Ithaka's character "Pacorro", a Mexican asylum seeker, appears in two scenes directly involving "Rue Bennett" (played by Emmy Award-winning lead actress, Zendaya).

== Works ==
=== Discography (solo releases) ===
- 1992 So Get Up (single) [Embryo Entertainment]
- 1993 So Get Up & The Lost Acapellas (spoken word album) [Sweatlodge Records]
- 1995 Fishdaddy (single) [Movieplay Records]
- 1995 Flowers and the Color of Paint (album) [Sweatlodge Records/Movieplay Records]
- 1997 Seabra Is Mad (single) Parlophone/Warner Music Group
- 1997 Stay Strong Little Brother – (single) Parlophone/Warner Music Group
- 1997 Stellafly: European Edition (album) Parlophone/Warner Music Group
- 1998 The Rise And Fall Of A Fortune (EP) Parlophone/Warner Music Group
- 2000 Stellafly: USA Edition – album [BCB Records/Sweatlodge Records]
- 2001 Somewhere South of Somalia – album [Sweatlodge Records/Khalifa Records]
- 2004 Recorded in Rio – album [Sweatlodge Records]
- 2005 Fuse With Me (EP by Ithaka vs. Cartell 70) [Ground Zero Records]
- 2007 Saltwater Nomad (album) [Sweatlodge Records]
- 2011 Fishdaddy Flashbacks – album [Sweatlodge Records]
- 2013 Voiceless Blue Raven (album) [Sweatlodge Records]
- 2017 So Get Up & The Los Acapellas (album rerelease) [Sweatlodge Records]
- 2022 Did You Ever? [Sweatlodge Records]
- 2022 Get Up I'm Free (single) produced by Siba Giba [Sweatlodge Records/Overtime Records]
- 2022 So Get Up - 30th Anniversary Brainboiler Remix (single)[Sweatlodge Records]
- 2025 Butterfly Boogie (single) [Sweatlodge Records]

=== Guest musical appearances ===
- 1994 "So Get Up"
- 1996 Marta Dias – "Look To The Blue", "Learn To Fly" (Ithaka: vocals, lyrics)
- 1996 Red Beans – "Sunny The Bunny", "Sushi-Pack Subway" (Ithaka: vocals, lyrics)
- 1996 Cool Hipnoise – "Hidden By The Sea"" (Ithaka: vocals, lyrics)
- 1997 General D – "Ekos Do Passado" (Ithaka: vocals, lyrics)
- 1998 Tejo Beat – "The Day Was Hot" (Ithaka: vocals/lyrics). Production Mario Caldato, Jr.
- 1998 More Republica Masonica – "Grounded Song" (Ithaka: vocals, lyrics)
- 1998 Mind Da Gap – "Intro" (Ithaka: vocals, lyrics)
- 2000 Primitive Reason – "The Day Will Come"(Ithaka: vocals, lyrics)
- 2005 Cartell 70 – "In the Name of Religion" (Ithaka: vocals, lyrics)
- 2007 DJ Vibe – "You" (Ithaka: vocals, lyrics)
- 2008 Pan Electric – "Someone, Somewhere" (Ithaka: vocals, lyrics)
- 2011 Si Brad – "20 Years" (Ithaka: vocals, lyrics) (Toko Records-U.K.)
- 2011 Paul Mandaca – Eden by The Sea / CD album (Ithaka: all lyrics)
- 2013 Cyncy – "Sometimes Life Gets In The Way" (Produced by: Ithaka) [Sweatlodge]
- 2013 Cosmic Gate – "So Get Up" (Ithaka: vocals, lyrics)
- 2020 Armando Mendes "This Life's All We Got" (Ithaka: lyrics/vocals)
- 2020 Ana Mariano – "Plastic Wings" (Ithaka: featured lyricist/vocalist)

== Art exhibitions ==
=== Solo art exhibitions (sculpture, painting, photography) ===
- 1990 Pepperdine University – Los Angeles, California (sculpture)
- 1992 Gallery YMA -(Photography and Sculpture) Tokyo, Japan (sculpture, photography)
- 1995 Universidade Moderna – Lisbon, Portugal (sculpture)
- 1996 IPJ: Instituto Portuguesa Da Juventude "UMBILICUS" (Photography) – Lisbon
- 1998 Gallery Ze Dos Bois "Quality Time: Part One" (Photography) – Lisbon, Portugal (photography, text, performance)
- 2000 International Surfing Museum – Huntington Beach California (sculpture)
- 2007 WOA – Way Of Arts – Estoril, Portugal (sculpture) curated by Gonçalo Leandro]
- 2008 Clash – Lisbon, Portugal (sculpture)
- 2010 Gallery Alma da Rua – São Paulo, Brazil (sculpture. photography)
- 2010 The Camp – Costa Mesa, California (sculpture, photography)
- 2011 Nike Posto 5.0 – Rio de Janeiro, Brazil (sculpture)
- 2012 Museum WOA – Way Of Arts
- 2013 Hurley International Costa Mesa, California (Sculpture, Painting)
- 2015 F+ Gallery in Santa Ana, California – "Aliens Of AkahtiLândia" (Sculpture, Photography, Painting)

=== Group art exhibitions ===
- 1990 01 Gallery Los Angeles
- 1992 NICAF: Nippon International Contemporary Art Fair – Yokohama, Japan
- 1999 Photo Impact Gallery – Los Angeles, California
- 2003 111 Minna Gallery – San Francisco, California
- 2005 MIS – São Paulo Museum of Image and Sound, Brazil
- 2006 MIS – São Paulo Museum of Image and Sound, Brazil
- 2007 Oca Do Ibirapuera – São Paulo, Brazil
- 2010 Oca Do Ibirapuera – São Paulo, Brazil
- 2011 Art Now Gallery (San Francisco) "Love And Guts" – Photo: Eazy E and Venice Skateboard Locals (1989)
- 2013 Sagres Surf Culture – Sagres, Portugal
- 2013 McNamara's Gallery (owned by Garrett McNamara) – Nazaré, Portugal
- 2014 House Of Vans (London) "Thrasher: A Retrospective" – Photo: Eazy E and Venice Locals (1989)
- 2014 Azores Wave Week – Ponta Delgado, São Miguel Island, Portugal"
- 2014 Surfboards On Parade – Huntington Beach, California
- 2016 The Art Of Surf – 1 Recovery – SM, CA (w/ Jeff Divine, John Van Hamersveld and John Severson)
- 2016 Surfboards On Parade – Huntington Beach, California (w/ Rick Reitveld and Heather Brown)
- 2017 Photoville (Brooklyn, NY) Contact High: Hip-Hop's Iconic Photographs And Visual Culture
- 2018 "Hip-Hop : Un Age d'Or" Musée d'Art Contemporain de Marseille – Curated by Siba Giba
- 2019 Contact High: A Visual History of Hip-Hop at The Annenberg Space for Photography (LA)
- 2020 Contact High: A Visual History of Hip-Hop at International Center of Photography (NY)
- 2021 Contact High: A Visual History of Hip-Hop at Manarat Al Saadiyat Museum in Abu Dhabi, United Arab Emirates

=== Books ===
- So Get Up
- Zé Dos Cães
- Moema
- Stellafly
- The Forgotten Four
- Miracle at Malibu
- Oxygen Falls
- Moments of Insanity
- Stellafly
