= Who's the Enemy? =

Single by Ithaka & Gabriel o Pensador

from the album Recorded in Rio (2004),
- Released: 1 September 2004
- Recorded: May 2003
- Studio: Studio Monoaural (Rio de Janeiro), Studio Nas Nuvens (Rio de Janeiro), Coffin Alley Studio (Los Angeles), Faith Recording Studios (Los Angeles)
- Genre: Hip hop, alternative hip hop, jazz rap
- Length: 5:16 (album version); 5:10 (single version)
- Label: Sweatlodge Records (published by Ravenshark Music/Scion Four Music/ASCAP)
- Songwriters: Ithaka, Gabriel o Pensador, Berna Ceppas
- Producers: Berna Ceppas, Ithaka

Music video
- "Who's the Enemy?" on YouTube

"Who's the Enemy?" is an English-language alternative hip hop anti-war song by Californian artist/songwriter Ithaka (Ithaka Darin Pappas) and Brazilian rapper and author, Gabriel o Pensador. The song was originally included on the album, Recorded in Rio, released for the first time in association with Blitz Magazine (Portugal) in 2004. It would later be featured on the soundtrack of the 2006 film, Lost Jewel of the Atlantic, directed by Jacob Holcomb and produced by World Surfing Reserves. The song promotes world peace, containing lyrical references to former U.S. President George W. Bush, The Cold War and global dictators.

== Recording ==
Sonically, "Who's the Enemy?" was programmed and pre-produced in early 2003 by Ithaka on Reason (software) at his sound lab, Coffin Alley Studios in Los Angeles. He then relocated for several months to Rio de Janeiro (Gabriel o Pensador's hometown) to record his entire album, Recorded in Rio at Studio Monoaural. There in Rio, his digital demo was recreated and expanded upon with live instruments with the aid of producer Berna Ceppas.

Ithaka had already invited friend Gabriel o Pensador (Portuguese for "Gabriel the Thinker") to participate on the track lyrically and vocally, but it had not been decided upon which specific song. Most of Ithaka's lyric notebook was full of a series of personal, short-story type songs and Gabriel, a rapper and author known for his intellectual, socially-oriented lyrics, longed to do something more inclusive of the current world events of that time. Gabriel then saw the rough lyrics for "Who's the Enemy?" in the lyric binder. They had been loosely based on an earlier song by Ithaka entitled "Erase the Slate of Hate" that had featured hip hop tuga pioneer General D and had appeared on the 1995 album Flowers and the Color of Paint.

With the global political situation seeming unchanged in 2003 since the recording of "Erase the Slate of Hate" in 1995, Ithaka wanted to relook at this same subject matter eight years later and was planning on doing a variation of the tune on the new album. Gabriel, saw what he was looking for in the song and it was decided he would contribute both vocals and lyrics to make an entirely new song.

At this point, the track still had Ithaka's digitally programmed Reason bass line and Gabriel invited his friend and early career producer Liminha, a celebrated Bassist, to improve it with a live instrument. In addition to being a former member of the Brazilian psychedelic rock group Os Mutantes, Liminha, had recorded and performed with Nação Zumbi, Ed Motta, Gilberto Gil, Caetano Veloso, etc. He is the recipient of a Grammy Award for Best Contemporary World Music Album and three Latin Grammy Awards for Best Brazilian rock Album, Best Música popular brasileira Album, Best Portuguese Language Contemporary Pop Album.

Only after the new, smooth fretless bass guitar of Liminha was laid down on the track did Gabriel record his vocals. The song is significant in the fact that, it would mark the first (and only) song in English that the celebrated lyricist and superstar has recorded to date.

Jeferson "Jefinho" Victor (a musician with composer Arto Lindsay) was then called in to provide melodic live flugelhorn and trumpet parts. And finally, DJ Negralha of the Brazilian reggae/rock band O Rappa, added final percussive details with vinyl Scratching and Berimbau.

The song was initially mixed by Daniel Carvalho and Fabiano Franco at STudio Monoaural. And later in Los Angeles, additional editing, mixing and mastering were done at Faith Recording Studios by Conley Abrams III and Ithaka.

The album that "Who's the Enemy?" first appeared on called Recorded in Rio was released as a purchasable supplement with Blitz in Portugal. It was a territory where both Ithaka and Gabriel were visible artists. Ithaka had lived and recorded there between 1992-1998 and had been nominated for a total of nine Blitz Music Awards and other accolades. And Gabriel, being a high-profile Brazilian hip hop figure, had frequently toured Portugal since 1993, already having several charting tracks on Portuguese radio. Because of these factors, "Who's the Enemy?" had a moderate amount of radio airtime.

== Lost Jewel of the Atlantic ==
In 2006, "Who's the Enemy?" appeared in the environmental surf documentary entitled Lost Jewel of the Atlantic. The project was directed and edited by Jacob Holcomb and produced by surfer/activist Will Henry for World Surfing Reserves, a division of the Save the Waves (USA). It premiered at the Santa Cruz Film Festival on Monday, 8 May 2006. Unknown to the film's producers, headlines appeared in newspapers on the island of Madeira the following day, one reading "Movie Documents the Fight to Save the Surf from Eager Investors and a Corrupt Government".

The news coverage provoked angry reactions from many of Madeira's political leaders, who promised to "judicially prosecute" those responsible for producing the film, "as criminals". Manuel Santos Costas, spokesman for the Cabinet of Madeiran President Alberto João Jardim, promised to take "adequate steps to defend the honor and good name of the region, its population, and its President. Despite protests from the right-wing government on the island, the movie was premiered in September 2006 at the Cinemax theater in Funchal on the island. It was the most profitable film the theater had seen in several years and later showed in theaters on mainland Portugal.

== Personal association ==
Ithaka Darin Pappas, who had been an early photographer of U.S. west coast hip hop artists such as Eazy E, N.W.A., Ice Cube, Low Profile, etc. for Priority Records and Quality Records, had moved to Lisbon, Portugal in 1992. There he had sporadic work with the music magazine, Super Som, published by Editora Abril. At the time, there was little or no hip hop in Portugal and Gabriel already had a big hit in Brazil with "Tô Feliz (Matei o Presidente)". A four-city Portugal tour had been arranged for Gabriel o Pensador, to introduce hip hop to the motherland, and when Ithaka heard about it he asked the magazine to assign him to cover one of the concerts as a photojournalist. They flatly refused, stating that hip hop was 'a fad and had no real place in the magazine'. But undiscouraged, Ithaka arrived at the artist's hotel a few hours before the concert, and introducing himself as hip hop photographer was able to suggest a photo session. There, in an empty banquet room at the hotel with his entourage nearby, Ithaka photographed nineteen year old Gabriel in a wheelchair. He had broken his leg a few days before playing soccer. The unusual images of a rapper in a full leg cast in a wheelchair ended up being a fold-out poster in the same magazine that had refused to book a photo session with the artist.

Gabriel O Pensador and Ithaka had not exchanged contact numbers at the photo session or following concert, but ironically had crossed paths just a few days later surfing at Praia do Guincho Beach, about 20 kilometers from Lisbon. It was uncommon at the time for people associated with hip hop to also be involved with surfing. The two became friends.

It was years later while Ithaka was visiting Gabriel o Pensador and his family in Brazil, that Gabriel suggested the idea to Ithaka of recording an album there in Rio de Janeiro. A couple of years later, after an introduction to producer Berna Ceppas was made, a new fifteen-track record finally began to materialize including the song, Who's The Enemy?
