= Stellafly =

Studio album by Ithaka
- Released: 27 October 1997
- Recorded: 1997, Valentim de Carvalho studios in Paço de Arcos, Portugal
- Genres: Hip hop, alternative hip hop
- Length: 71:42
- Labels: Valentim de Carvalho, NorteSul, Sweatlodge Records, BCB Records, EMI Records **Publishing administered by North Music Group [USA]
- Producer: Joe Fossard

Ithaka chronology
Flowers and the Color of Paint (1995)	Stellafly (1997)	Somewhere South of Somalia (2001)

Stellafly is the second full-length album to be released by Californian Alternative hip hop artist Ithaka.

== History ==
Stellafly was written and recorded in Lisbon, Portugal in 1997, (where Ithaka lived and worked between 1992 and 1998) and is based upon his own personal adventures in Western Europe. Lyrically the record covers many diverse topics such as Substance abuse, Big wave surfing, and Ghosts.

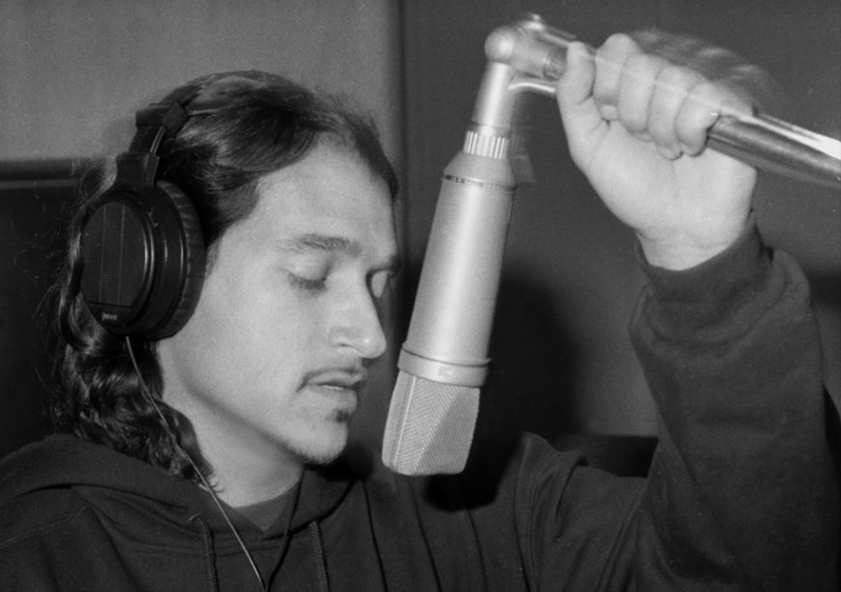
Songwriter-vocalist, Ithaka Darin Pappas, recording "Seabra Is Mad" at Valentim de Carvalho Studios in Lisbon, Portugal.

Although the album is in the English language, it was nominated for four Blitz Premios (The Portuguese Grammy) and in 1997 received top honours in the respected Portuguese newspaper Jornal Público for "Best Song" Seabra Is Mad, "Best Video"(Seabra Is Mad), "Artist Of The Year" and "Album Of The Year".

The single Seabra Is Mad from this album later appeared on the hit Xbox 360 basketball game, NBA 2K7 and another song " The Plot" was featured on the soundtrack for the American surfing documentary "Second Thoughts" directed by Timmy Turner, winner of the 2004 Surfer Magazine award for "Best Video".

The record's title track, Stellafly, is a spoken word rendition of Ithaka's anti-Petrarchan short story poem of the same name, which revolves around Fairfax District, Los Angeles, with a pivotal passage taking place at the New Beverly Cinema and two young people with a common interest in Southern Gothic films. The work was first published in book form as a novelette in 1993 as part of the series Curson Avenue Archives.

The album was co-produced by Ewan Butler and Joe Fossard and musically co-written by Butler (from the British band Bradford) and Fossard, both originally from Blackburn, England. Together, the two essentially created the soundtrack for Ithaka's narrative story-telling lyricism. In addition to Fossard's electronic programming and the guitars, bass and keyboards of Butler, the seventeen tracks on the album also featured guests performers such as singer Marta Dias, rapper Ace (from Mind Da Gap), rapper X-Sista, singer Hi-Fi Jô, singer-artist Mimi Tavares and others.

Although Ithaka is an American citizen of Greek origins, because the album was made in Portugal and utilized many Portuguese guest artists, Stellafly (and Ithaka's preceding album, Flowers And The Color Of Paint) is often included in the genre of music known as Hip hop Tuga along with artists such as General D, Boss AC, etc.

== Cover photograph ==
The album's original cover image was created by Ithaka Darin Pappas himself; a photograph of a woman wearing a chicken wire swimsuit in front of the sculpture (also called Stellafly) from his body of artwork called, The Reincarnation Of A Surfboard.

== Track listing ==
- 1. The Bum With Blue Blood - 2:02
- 2. Substance-Free Exile - 2:44
- 3. The Plot (featuring Mimi Tavares) - 3:15
- 4. Eden By The Sea (featuring Jôsette) - 4:31
- 5. Ain't No Breeze - 2:36
- 6. Butterfly Of Wisdom - 3:35
- 7. Seabra Is Mad - 4:22
- 8. Stay Strong Little Brother (featuring Jôsette) - 4:12
- 9. Capricorn And Cancer (featuring X-Sista) - 4:07
- 10. King Tardy - 2:13
- 11. Sunny The Bunny (with the Red Beans) - 4:03
- 12. Sushi-Pack Subway (with the Red Beans) - 2:46
- 13. Alabama Cave Party (featuring Ace) - 7:57
- 14. The Rise And Fall Of A Fortune - 7:57
- 15. Spiritual Graveyard - 3:48
- 16. Ursula Of Ithaka (featuring Marta Dias) - 4:36
- 17. Stellafly - 8:33

== Articles about (or mentioning) the album, Stellafly ==
- 2008 Surfline [USA] "Saltwater Nomad" written by Steve Zeldin
- 2013 Journal I [Portugal] - "Ithaka Is Also Mad" written by Beatriz Silva
- 2013 Rock/Pop Portuguesa - written by Katia Abreu
