= The Reincarnation of a Surfboard =

Group of sculptures

Official poster of "The Reincarnation Of A Surfboard" exhibit hosted by The Camp in Costa Mesa, California (2010). Sculpture shown, "Ravensplice II"

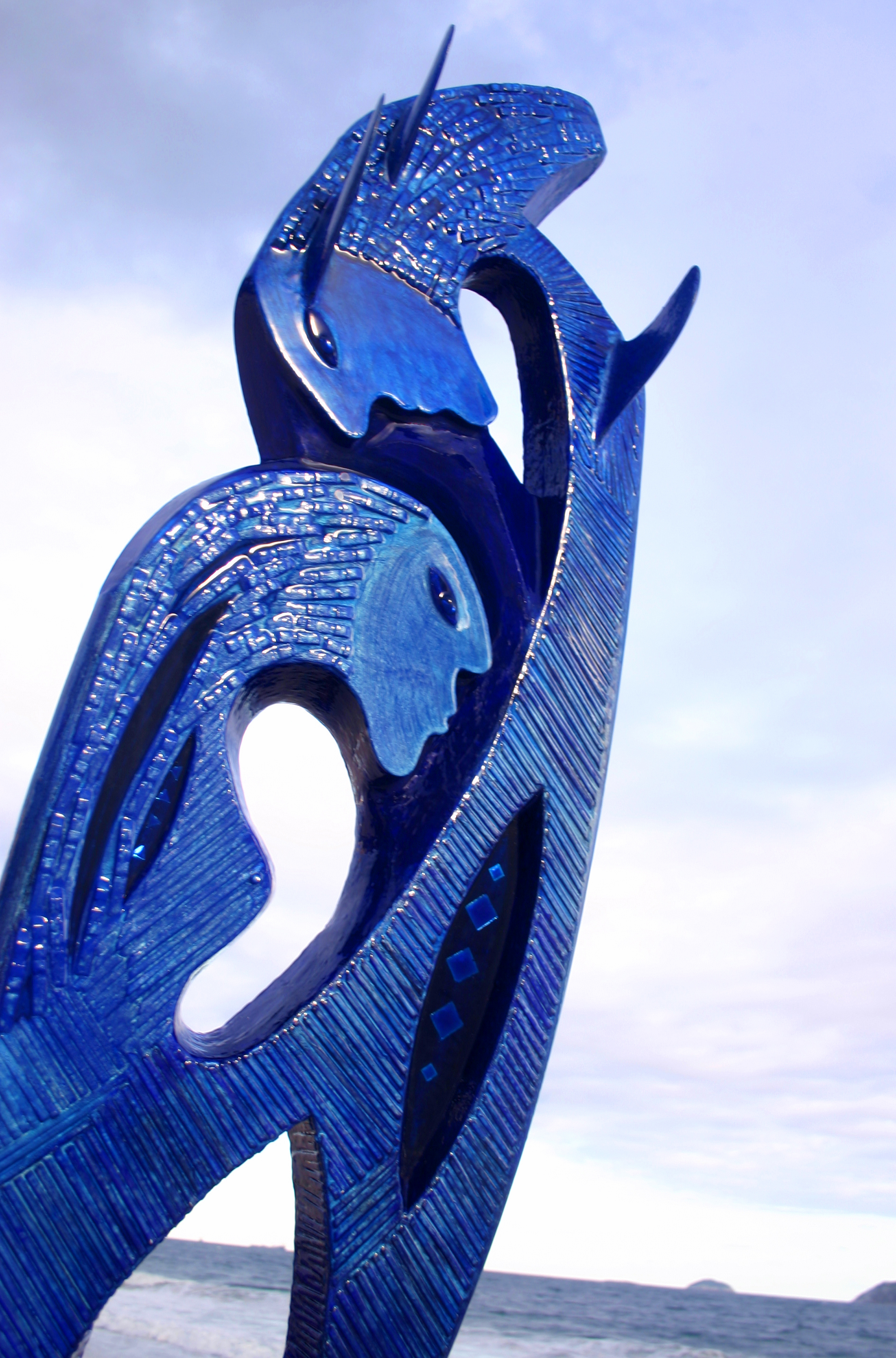
"Soulmates From Atlantis"

The Reincarnation of a Surfboard is a body of sculpture work created by Ithaka Darin Pappas (contemporary artist, musician, photographer, writer and surfer). The project, which began in 1989 consist of approximately 300 wall-mounted sculptures that have been made using recycled surfboards as raw building material. The series to date has been exhibited on four continents (Asia, Europe, North America, South America). The most recent solo exhibitions of these works were mesa hosted by WOA - Way Of Arts in Cascais, Portugal in December 2012, by Hurley International in Costa Mesa, California in October 2013 and F+ Gallery in Santa Ana in February 2015.

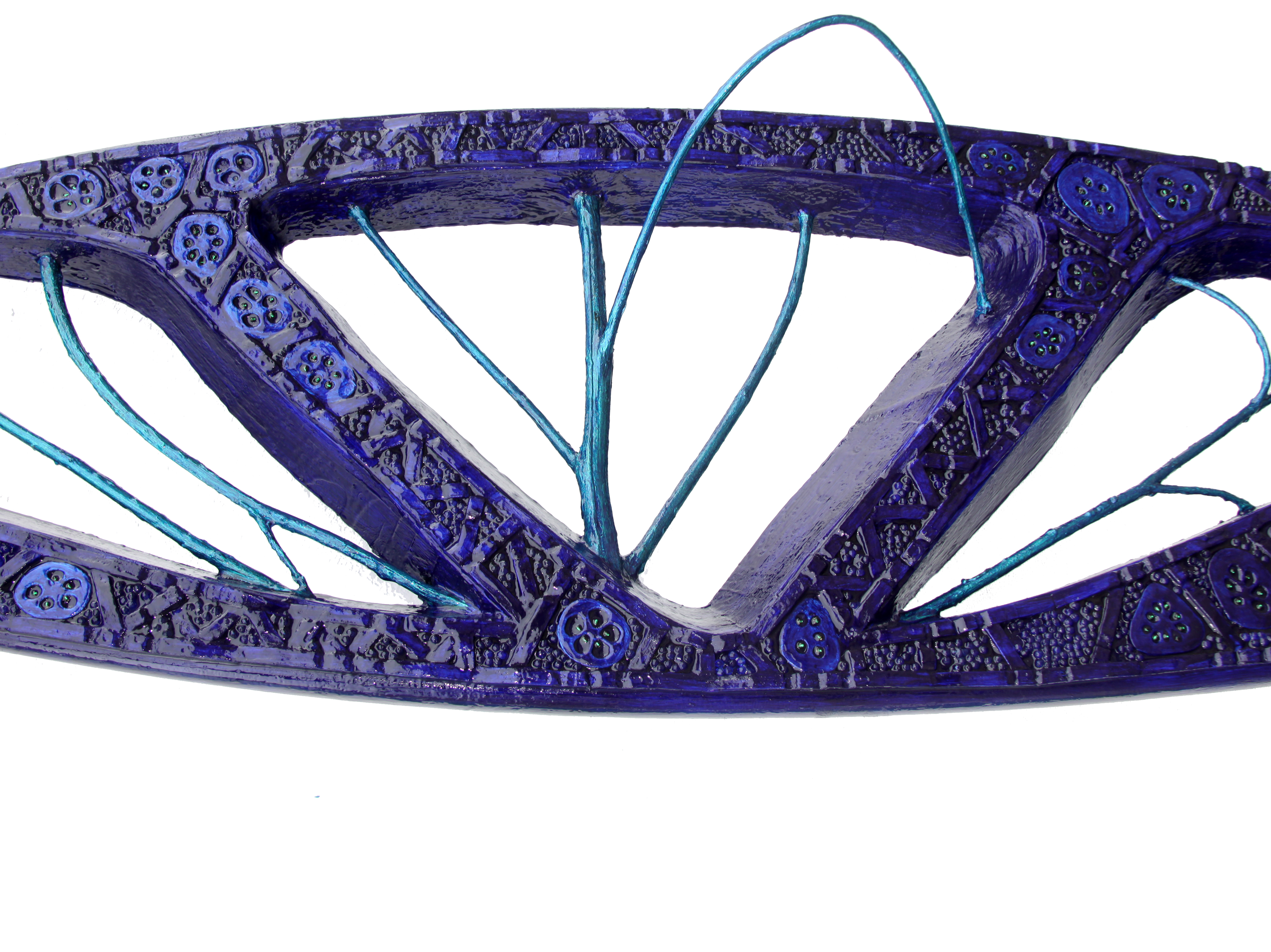
"Amanari" a reincarnated surfboard sculpture by artist Ithaka Darin Pappas from the series Jurema 2009

In December 2012, during an interview piece regarding his solo showing of surfboard sculptures at Gallery WOA in Lisbon, Fuel TV Europe (a popular action sports channel) declared Ithaka Darin Pappas as "The Godfather of Contemporary Surf Art".

== Solo exhibitions ==
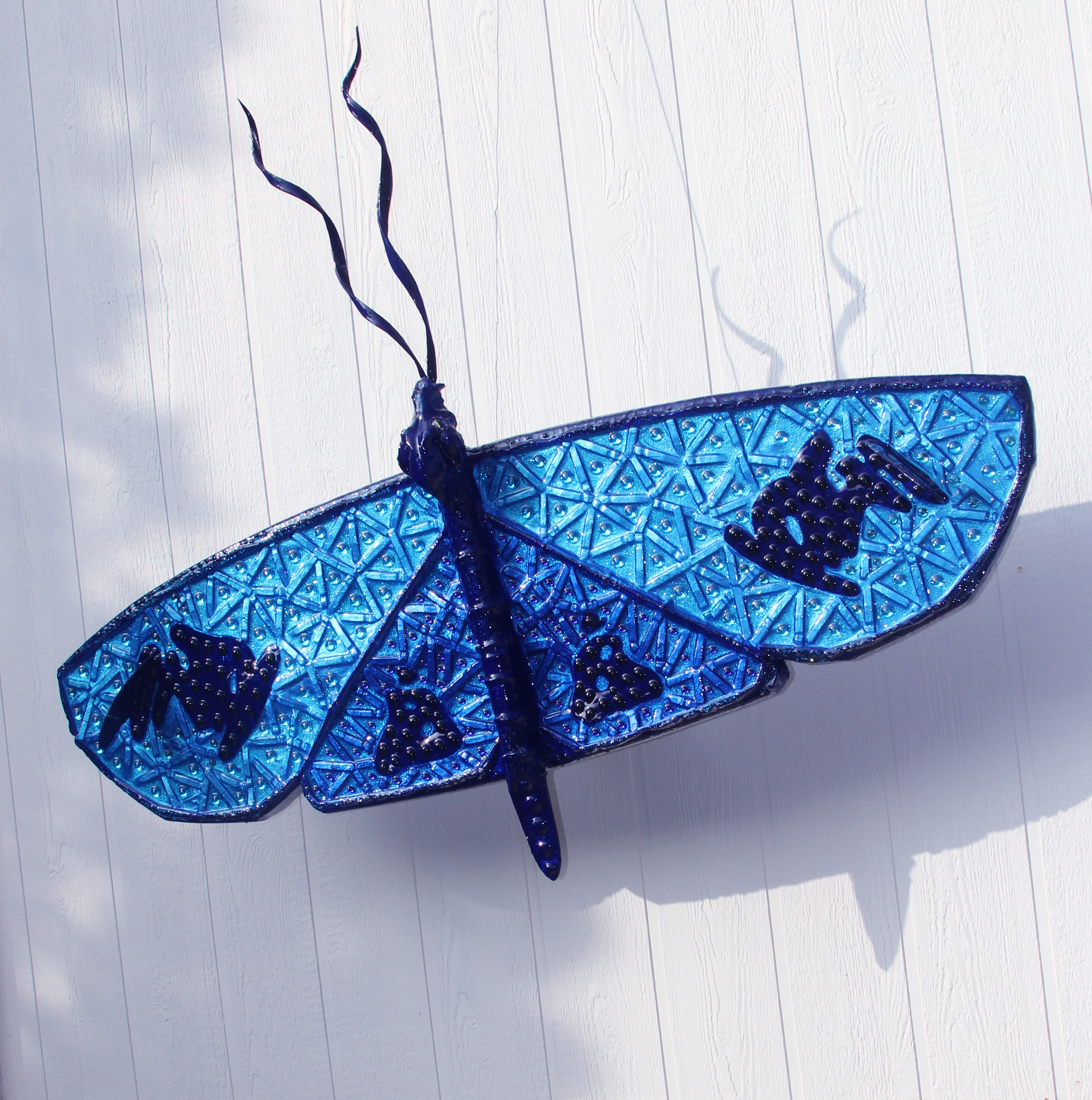
"Bucerius Palus Tinea" a reincarnated surfboard sculpture by Ithaka Darin Pappas from the series Aliens Of AkahtiLandia 2015

- 2015 F+ Gallery - Santa Ana, California (Sculptures, Photographs, Paintings)
- 2013 Hurley International - Costa Mesa, California (Sculptures, Photographs, Paintings)
- 2012 WOA - Way Of Arts (Sculpture, Video & Photography) curated by Gonçalo Leandro- Cascais, Portugal
- 2011 Nike Posto 5.0 - Rio de Janeiro, Brazil
- 2010 The Camp - Costa Mesa, California
- 2010 Gallery Alma da Rua - São Paulo, Brazil
- 2008 Clash - Lisbon, Portugal
- 2007 WOA - Way Of Arts - Estoril, Portugal curated by Gonçalo Leandro
- 2000 International Surfing Museum - Huntington Beach, California

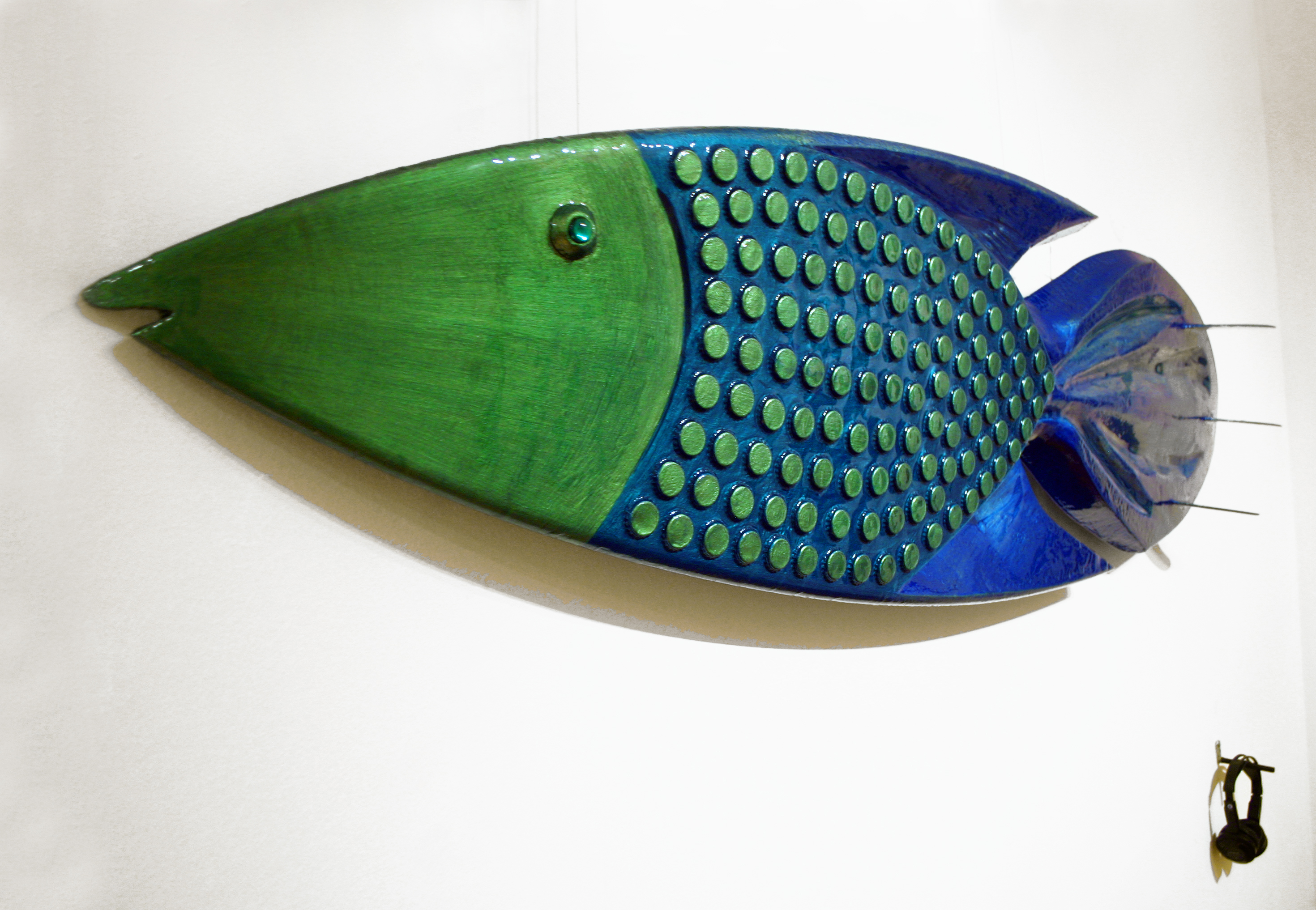
"LURE #3" by Ithaka Darin Pappas as exhibited at Gallery WOA: Way Of Arts in Estoril, Portugal

.

- 1995 Universidade Moderna - Lisbon, Portugal
- 1992 Gallery YMA -(Photography and Sculpture) Tokyo, Japan
- 1990 Pepperdine University - Los Angeles, California

== Group exhibitions ==
- 2023 Surf Skate Roots Rock (Los Angeles)* 2016 Surfboards On Parade - Huntington Beach, California
- 2014 Surfboards On Parade - Huntington Beach, California
- 2013 Sagres Surf Culture - Sagres, Portugal
- 2010 Oca Do Ibirapuera - São Paulo, Brazil
- 2007 Oca Do Ibirapuera - São Paulo, Brazil
- 2006 MIS - São Paulo Museum of Image and Sound, Brazil
- 2005 MIS - São Paulo Museum of Image and Sound, Brazil
- 2003 Gallery Minna 111 - San Francisco, California
- 1992 NICAF: Nippon International Contemporary Art Fair - Yokohama, Japan
- 1990 01 Gallery Los Angeles

== Book appearances ==
- 2009 "Surf Story" compiled by Robb Havassy
- 2004 Belong: A TV Journalist's Search for Urban Culture – by Jennifer Morton (Canada)
- 2000 The End of Print by David Carson (graphic designer) (United States)

== Documentary ==
- 2006 On the Road to Ithaka - A documentary about the artist Ithaka Darin Pappas directed by Susanna Lira. Winner of the Best Script Award at the FATU Film Festival, São Paulo Brazil

== TV features ==
- 2012 Action Sport Plus – Fuel TV
- 2012 Zoomed In – Sport TV
- 2012 Curto Circuito – SIC Radical

== Magazine, newspaper, and web features ==
- 2013 The Orange County Register - "Broken Boards Given New Life As Art" by Laylan Connelly
- 2013 Jornal I - "Ithaka Is Also Mad" by Beatriz Silva (May 4, 2013)
- 2012 Surf Portugal Magazine - "Pranchas Renascidas" by Susana Santos
- 2012 Onfire Magazine (Portugal)
- 2012 Visão Magazine (Portugal) "Pranchas De Surf Reencarnadas Como Art" by João Paulo Vieira
- 2012 Fluir Magazine (Brazil) "Miscelania" by Alessandro de Toni
- 2010 The Huffington Post - "Surf's Up And Get Creative!" by Lauren Selman
