= Flowers and the Color of Paint =

Studio album by Ithaka
- Released: 15 June 1995
- Recorded: 1995, Namouche Studios - Lisbon, Portugal
- Genre: Hip hop, alternative hip hop, downtempo, spoken word
- Length: 57:23
- Label: Fábrica de Sons / publishing: Ravenshark Music/North Music Group/ASCAP
- Producer: Joe Fossard, Grizzly

Ithaka chronology
So Get Up & The Lost Acapellas (1993)	Flowers and the Color of Paint (1995)	Stellafly (1997)

Flowers and the Color of Paint is a 1995 travel-oriented hip hop, downtempo and spoken word album by Californian lyricist, vocalist and visual artist, Ithaka (also known as Ithaka Darin Pappas).

Ithaka created the story-telling lyrical content of its songs sporadically in the couple of years leading up to the actual studio recordings. They are often based upon his own personal adventures in Western Europe, North Africa and his native Los Angeles. They cover diverse subjects such as astrology, street violence and surf travel (such as depicted in the song "Somewhere South of Gibraltar").

== Recording ==
The album was recorded in early 1995 during a one-month period at Namouche Studios in Lisbon, Portugal (the city where Ithaka lived and worked from 1992 to 1998). The approximate budget was $8,000 USD.

The record (produced by Joe Fossard and Grizzly) consists of thirteen tracks, with Ithaka assuming lead vocals. It features many Portuguese and African guest performers, including singers Marta Dias (São Tomé, West Africa) and Ninicha (Portugal); rappers General D (Mozambique) and Lince (São Tomé); and Portuguese musicians Tiago Santos (guitar), João Gomes (keyboards), Francisco Rebelo (bass), Nuno Reis (trumpet), and Paulo Muiños (saxophone). The latter four were members of the project Cool Hipnoise. Artist and musician João Paulo Feliciano also appeared as a guitarist on the song "Somewhere South of Gibraltar".

== Single ==
In June 1995, a few weeks before the actual album release, a free CD single of the mythical, urban-story song "Fishdaddy" (track #3 on the album) was included in the youth culture magazine Super Jovem published by Editora Abril. Ithaka appeared on the cover of that issue, in an image created by João Barbosa.

== Reception ==
Although Ithaka is an American citizen of Greek ancestry and the album's vocals are almost entirely in English, because Flowers and the Color of Paint was entirely recorded in Portugal and utilized many Portuguese-language guest performers, the record (and also Ithaka's following album Stellafly) is often included in the genre of music known as Primeira Geração hip hop tuga (or first generation rap Portuguese) along with artists such as Black Company, Boss AC, Da Weasel, General D, Mind Da Gap, and Zona Dread.

The album overall was considered a critical success at the time of release by most of the media outlets in its main territory of distribution, Portugal. It was considered by some as the record that showed the true potential of hip hop in Portugal. Songs from Flowers and the Color of Paint received a fair amount of radio play on mainstream Portuguese stations such as RFM and Antena 3. Ithaka appeared on the covers of Pop Rock, Blitz, and Super Jovem magazines during the summer of the album's release.

Flowers and the Color of Paint was nominated in three categories at Channel SIC's televised 1995 Premios Blitz (considered the Grammy Awards of Portugal) for Best New Artist, Best Male Vocalist and Best Album.

A 1999 article written by Luis Maio titled "Os Maiores Talentos Portugueses Dos anos 90" (The Biggest Portuguese Talents Of The 1990s) published in the national newspaper Público, listed Flowers and the Color of Paint as one of the most influential Portuguese albums of the 1990s. In 2001, writer Rui Portulez described the album in another Público article as "um dos discos mais interessantes do hip-hop português" ("one of the most interesting Portuguese hip hop records").

In the 2004 book Belong: A TV Journalist's Search for Urban Culture (published by Insomniac Press), Canadian author Jennifer Morton says about the album, "The sound is smooth vocals with a nice background groove and a little Portuguese rap dropped in. It's good. Ithaka was so out there, doing his own thing. People liked him. He speaks his lyrics and has some great lines such as, My loyalty don't lie in street commotion, I give my praise to the motion of the ocean, she kept me out of trouble, she kept me alive, she kept me off the street, away from guns and knives."

A 2016 article in the Portuguese music magazine Blitz cited Flowers and the Color of Paint as one of "Os 40 Melhores Álbuns Dos Anos 90 Em Portugal" ("One Of The Best 40 Portuguese Records of the 1990s").

In 2017, the journalist Hugo Jorge included the album in his article "Os álbuns Mais Caros Do Hip Hop Português" ("The Most Expensive Portuguese Hip Hop Albums") for his column on the music website Rimas E Batidas, stating it to be among the priciest of Portuguese urban music releases. He discovered rare used copies of the original CD pressing selling on the international marketplace Discogs for upwards of 59€.

== Songs in film and television ==
In 1995, two songs from the album, "The Pigeon Lady" and the record's title track, "Flowers and the Color of Paint", were featured in a musical surf film called G-Land Pro. The project was an experimental non-dialogue documentary depicting a World Surf League "Dream Tour" event called the 1995 Quiksilver Pro (in Grajagan, Java, Indonesia) directed/edited by professional surfers Seth Elmer and Doug Silva. It aired on some sports channels, but was primarily for sale as a DVD in surf shops that carried Quiksilver products. In the segments featuring the two Color of Paint songs, top professional surfers including eleven-time world champion Kelly Slater, two-time world champion Tom Carroll, Rob Machado, Jeff Booth, Pat O'Connel and John Shimooka are pictured riding some of the best waves that had ever been seen for an international competition.

In 1998, three years after the album's release, the song "Escape From The City Of Angels" (featuring Marta Dias) was used in the soundtrack of director Antoine Fuqua's feature film debut Replacement Killers. Other musical artists on the soundtrack included The Crystal Method, Talvin Singh, Tricky, Death In Vegas, Hed PE, and Brad.

In 2004, "Escape From the City of Angels" also appeared in the TV comedy series Good Girls Don't, produced by Oprah Winfrey's Oxygen Channel, in an episode written by Claudia Lonow and directed by Linda Mendoza entitled "Addicted To Love".

== Cover art and booklet ==
Flower and the Color of Paint's original cover image was created by Ithaka Darin Pappas and represents a symbol from his graphic art series entitled The Tomas Blots, combined with a blue-toned photo of a typical Lisbon cobblestone sidewalk. Each lyric page in the CD booklet was accompanied with a photograph by Ithaka (who began as a photographer) to illustrate each individual story-song.

== Track listing ==
1. Street Loyalty? (featuring Ninicha) - 6:52
2. The Umbilibus (featuring Lince) - 4:10
3. Fishdaddy (featuring Mimi) - 6:38
4. Escape From the City of Angels (featuring Marta Dias) - 4:59
5. Erase the Slate of Hate (featuring General D) - 4:54
6. Been Four Years - 5:01
7. Somewhere South of Gibraltar (featuring electric guitar by João Paulo Feliciano) - 6:50
8. The Pigeon Lady - 1:12
9. Stonemobile - 3:43
10. Rich Girl (Ketchup Love) - 8:09
11. Sleepdriver - 3:15
12. Goodcookies (featuring Marta Dias) - 2:52
13. Flower and the Color of Paint (featuring Ninicha) - 7:17
