= Wavelength (disambiguation) =

A wavelength is a property of a wave.

Wavelength may also refer to:

- Wavelength (album), a 1978 album by Van Morrison
  - "Wavelength" (song), the album's title track
- Wavelength (band), a British soft rock band
- Wavelength (1967 film), a film by Michael Snow
- Wavelength (1983 film), a film by Mike Gray
- Wavelength (magazine), a surfing magazine
- Wavelength (game), a 2019 party game
- WaveLength, a charitable organisation in the United Kingdom
- Wavelength Music Arts Projects, a Toronto-based live music series
- Wavelength (DC Comics), a fictional villain from DC Comics
- "Wavelength" (Taggart), a 2000 television episode

== See also ==
- De Broglie wavelength, the matter-wavelength associated with a massive particle
