= Seabra Is Mad =

Single by Ithaka

from the album Stellafly
- B-side: Butterfly of Wisdom
- Released: 1997
- Recorded: 1997
- Genre: Drum and bass, electronic rock
- Length: 3:41
- Label: Sweatlodge Records/NorteSul / Valentim de Carvalho / Parlophone, Warner Music Group, **Publishing administered by North Music Group [USA]
- Songwriters: Ithaka (lyrics). Joe Fossard and Ewan Butler (music)
- Producer: Joe Fossard

Ithaka singles chronology
"Escape from the City of Angels" (1995)	"Seabra Is Mad" (1997)	"Stay Strong Little Brother" (1997)

"Seabra Is Mad" is a 1997 drum and bass/alternative rock "story song" by Californian lyricist/vocalist Ithaka. The song was released as the first single from his second studio album Stellafly. Recorded in Portugal, it was produced by Joe Fossard featuring Ewan Butler on guitar and Sergio Nascimento on the chorus drums.

Lyrically it depicts a near death experience with real life surfing legend Jose Seabra in giant seas of the then unknown waves of Portugal. Portugal has since become recognized as one of the world's premier big wave surfing locations. Público awarded it Song of the Year and Video of the Year.

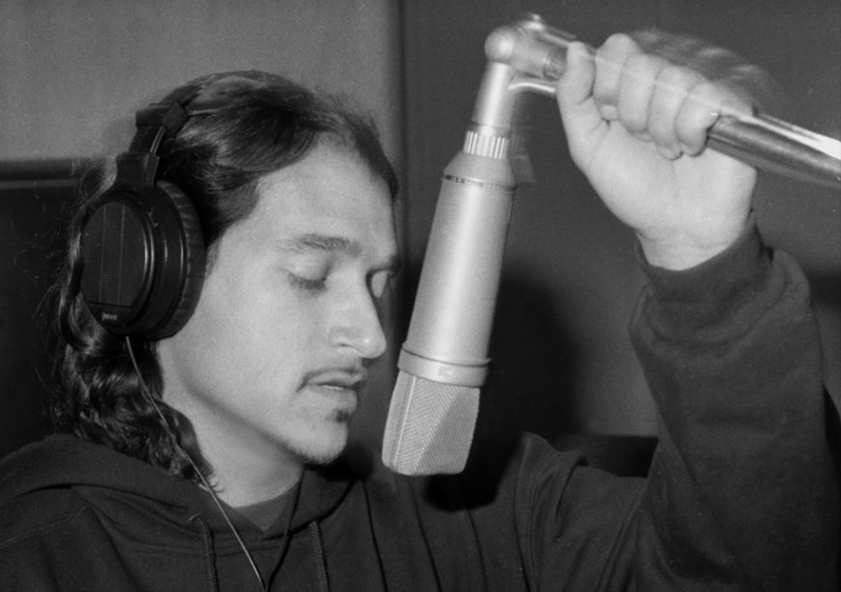
Songwriter-vocalist Ithaka Darin Pappas recording the demo of "Seabra Is Mad" at the studios of Valentim de Carvalho in Lisbon, Portugal (December 1996)

== Awards and accolades ==
"Seabra Is Mad" was nominated for both Song and Video of the Year in 1997 by the Blitz Magazine Awards (Premios Blitz) in Portugal; the national newspaper Público awarded it Song of the Year and Video of the Year; and named Ithaka as one of the Personalities of the Year, calling it the country's "most powerful and consistent release" of 1997.

== Music video ==
The video, directed by Nuno Franco in Portugal, features Ithaka wearing a real octopus as a head dress and also features Ewan Butler playing surfboard guitar sculpture

== Cover art ==
The front and back cover images of "Seabra Is Mad" were made by photographer Don Weinstein in Los Angeles and features portraits of Ithaka with his reincarnated sculpture work.

== In popular culture ==
The instrumental version is featured in the soundtrack of NBA 2K7 from the No. 1-rated basketball video game series produced by 2K (one of the top selling games of 2007 on both Xbox 360 and PlayStation 3 platforms). In addition, a mix entitled Retro SoCal also appeared in the surfing documentary, Chasing the Lotus, directed by Gregory Schelle and narrated by Jeff Bridges.

== Versions and remixes ==
The original CD single of "Seabra Is Mad" also included an "Instrumental Version" of the song as well as an "Amazonian Version" (which omitted the live drums in the chorus). In 1998, the "Rockhead Mix" version produced by Joe Fossard was included on Ithaka's three-song release Escape for Nortesul Records/ Valentim de Carvalho. Ithaka entirely rerecorded his vocal for the song.

Musicians include Adriano João (bass), Ewan Butler (guitar) and Sergio Nascimento (drums).
