= Zeldin =

Zeldin is an eastern Ashkenazic matronymic surname derived from the combination of the Yiddish female personal name Zelde (from the Middle High German word sælde meaning ‘fortunate’, ‘blessed’, or 'happiness'.) + the eastern Slavic possessive suffix -in. Notable people with the surname include:

- Alexander Zeldin (born 1985), British dramatist, author, and theatre director
- Isaiah Zeldin (1920–2018), American rabbi
- Lee Zeldin (born 1980), Administrator of the Environmental Protection Agency; former U.S. Representative from New York and New York state senator
- Steve Zeldin (born 1963), American sports magazine publisher, editor and journalist
- Theodore Zeldin (born 1933), British philosopher, sociologist, historian, writer and public speaker
- Vladimir Zeldin (1915–2016), Russian theatre and cinema actor
