= Marta Dias =

São Toméan Portuguese singer of jazz, world music and fado

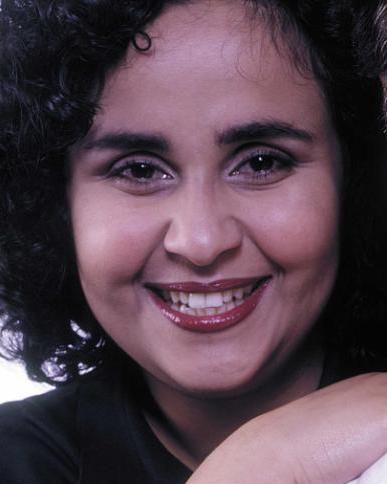
- Marta Dias c. 2006

Background information
- Born: Marta Dias; 28 November 1964 (age 61); São Tomé, São Tomé and Príncipe
- Genres: World music, Fado, Jazz, Hip hop
- Occupations: vocalist, lyricist, songwriter
- Instrument: Vocals
- Years active: 1986–present
- Labels: União Lisboa, Movieplay, BigBit

Marta Dias is a São Toméan Portuguese singer of jazz, world music and fado who has recorded several solo albums and has additionally recorded and toured extensively with guitarist António Chainho. She has also appeared on several hip hop releases, including the Ithaka song, Escape From The City Of Angels, which appeared in Columbia Pictures's feature film release, The Replacement Killers in 1998.

== Early life ==
Marta Dias was born in São Tomé, the capital city of the Central African island nation of São Tomé and Principe, to a Portuguese mother and a São Toméan father. Her paternal grandmother was from Goa, India (which along with São Tomé is a former Portuguese colony). Her father, Nuno Xavier Dias, is credited as the person who proclaimed the liberation of São Tomé from colonial rule. The family relocated to the Lisbon area of Portugal when Marta was a young girl.

She sang for the first time as a teenager at the Teatro de Animação de Setúbal in Setúbal, Portugal. Later, while briefly living in Germany, she studied vocals in Cologne with the Brazilian singer Marta Laurito.

== Early career ==
Marta Dias' first professional recordings were with the pioneering, Lisbon-based Hip hop tuga artist General D, (originally from Mozambique). She was featured on his songs "Amigo Prekavido" and "Raiz Desenraizadao" for the album Pé Na Tchôn, Karapinha Na Céu (EMI-1995), one of the first hip hop releases in Portugal. The recording (and concerts) with General D led to more acquaintances within the Lisbon music community. She soon recorded the song, "Bairro De Lata" with the jazzy hip hop band, Cool Hipnoise and also recorded the songs "Good Cookies", "Umbilibus" and "Escape From The City Of Angels" with Ithaka Darin Pappas, a Greek-American artist residing in Portugal, for his album Flowers and the Color of Paint.

In 1996, Marta recorded her first solo album, "Y.U.É" produced and composed by UK musician Jonathan Miller for the Portuguese label, União Lisboa. Californian songwriter, Ithaka provided lyrics for two of the tracks, "Learn To Fly" and "Look To The Blue", (on Look to the Blue, Ithaka also appeared as a guest vocalist). The album earned Marta the "Best Female Vocalist" award at Channel SICTV's annual televised Premios Blitz, (the Portuguese "Grammy Award".

António Chainho and Marta Dias performed together for the first time in November 1998, at a concert in honor of the guitarist's 30-year career. Marta Dia sang "Barco Negro" and "Nemes Paredes I confess". It was the beginning of a musical association that would last almost a decade.

Through the years, she continued to collaborate with other artists on both recordings and live performances. In 1997, she appeared on Ithaka's track "Ursula Of Ithaka" for the album, Stellafly. In 1998, she performed with singing star Kika Santos at the Expo '98 ((1998 Lisbon World Exposition). The song, "Amazing Grace" by African Voices. "Invisivel" by Fernando Cunha for his album Só Há Tempo P´ra Viver Agora. The song and "Nada Mudou" by Santos e Pecadores. In 1999, she also participated on TV personality Herman José's Christmas album.

In 1999, Marta Dias release her second solo effort entitled "Aqui"(Here), which included several cover versions by known Portuguese language artist such as; "Dream" originally by Madredeus, Madresongs such as "Fado Morno", the traditional Galician "En el Sagrado en Vigo", from the songbook of Martim Codax, "Toxicity" of the GNR, Madredeus "Dream", "Eu Contigo "by Sérgio Godinho," Ossobô ", by the Brazilian Marcelo da Veiga," Grão de Arroz "," Senhora "by João Roiz de Castel-Branco," Sou Tua "or" Ahora Baixou o Sol ", this collection Giacometti. This album was nominated for the José Afonso Awards. Until the end of 2001, Marta Dias toured nationally with the songs from Aqui, also performing concerts in Spain and special a concert in São Paulo, Brazil with Ney Matogrosso, in celebration of the 500th anniversary of the arrival of the Portuguese in Brazil.

In 2003, António Chaínho and Marta Dias, after years of touring internationally together since 1998 released the album "Ao Vivo no CCB" (Live at the Centre Cultural de Bélem, Lisbon), recorded January 28 and 29 of 2003. The record includes seven original tracks, four of which having never been recorded before. The two have continued to collaborate on recordings and live concerts until today.

== Recent career ==
Marta Dias released the album "Quantas Tribos" in 2016. The album is a tribute to five of the greatest poets from São Tomé and Príncipe; Maria Manuela Margarido, Alda Neves da Graça do Espírito Santo, Francisco José Tenreiro, Fernando de Macedo and Conceição Lima. The album uses these classic poems as lyrical content, intertwining Marta's vocals over instrumental compositions provided by the classical guitarist, Oswaldo Santos. Vocalist Carmen Souza participates on the song in "Os Rios Da Tribo" and Angolan poet/vocalist appears Kalaf on the song, "Humanidade".

In 2018, Marta Dias and Goan pianist Carlos Barreto Xavier collaborated on the album, "Bandida", consisting of twelve tracks, using both traditional Portuguese music blending with more modern urbans sounds. The album also features percussionist Ruca Rebordão and Yuri Daniel on electric bass.

== Albums ==
- 1996 Marta Dias – "Y.U.É" – Label: União Lisboa Label: União Lisboa
- 1999 Marta Dias – "Aqui" – Label: Farol Música
- 2003 António Chainho & Marta Dias "Ao Vivo No CCB" (Live at the Centro Cultural de Bélem) Label: Movieplay
- 2016 Marta Dias "Quantas Tribos" (With guests: Costa Neto, Carmen Souza) Label: Bigbit
- 2018 Marta Dias and Barreto Xavier "Bandida"

== Singles ==
- 1996 Marta Dias "Gritar" – Label: União Lisboa
- 1996 Marta Dias "Mouraria" – Label: União Lisboa
- 2006 Marta Dias & António Chainho "Fado Tão Bom" – Label: Movieplay

== Appearances on compilations ==
- 2005 LJS & Marta Dias "Barca Bela" Album: Composto De Mudança (Música Para Se Deixar Levar)Label: Som Livre
- 2006 Marta Dias & António Chainho "Fado Tão Bom" – Label: Movieplay

== Guest appearances ==
- 1995 "Amigo Prekavido" General D feat. Marta Dias – Album: Pé Na Tchôn, Karapinha Na Céu – Label: EMI
- 1995 "Raiz Desenraizadao "General D feat. Marta Dias – Album: Pé Na Tchôn, Karapinha Na Céu – Label: EMI
- 1995 "Escape From The City Of Angels" Ithaka feat. Marta Dias – Album: Flowers And The Color Of Paint
- 1995 "Goodcookies" Ithaka feat' Marta Dias – Album: Flowers And The Color Of Paint
- 1995 "The Umbilibus"Ithaka feat. Lince & Marta Dias – Album: Flowers And The Color Of Paint
- 1995 Ithaka feat. Marta Dias "Escape From The City Of Angels" Album: Flowers And The Color Of Paint
- 1995 "Bairro de Lata – Cool Hipnoise feat. Marta Dias – Album: Nascer Do Soul – Label:NorteSul/Valentim de Carvalho
- 1997 "Ekos Do Passado" General D feat. Marta Dias & Ithaka – ALbum: Kanimambo – Label: EMI
- 1997 "Ursula Of Ithaka" Ithaka feat. Marta Dias – Album: Stellafly – Label: Nortesul/Valentim de Carvalho
- 1997 "Nobody Knows" Marta Dias and African Voices
- 1997 "Nada Mudou" – Santos e Pecadores
- 1998 "Fadinho Simples" – António Chainho
- 1998 "Só Há Tempo P´ra Viver Agora" Fernando Cunha feat. Marta Dias – Label: BMG
- 1999 "Silent Night" – Herman José [1999]
- 2011 "Luminoso" Fernando Alvim – Album: Fados & Canções – Label: Universal Music Group
- 2012 "Fadinho Simples" António Chainho feat. Marta Dias – Album: Entre Amigos – Label: Movieplay
- 2017 O Homem do Fraque" Dizzy – Album: O Homem Invisível

== The Replacement Killers ==
In 1998, three years after its release, the Ithaka song "Escape From The City Of Angels" (that featured Marta Dias in the infectious choruses) was used in the soundtrack of director Antoine Fuqua's feature film debut Replacement Killers released by Columbia Pictures. The song played during a critical getaway scene that involved the actors; Chinese superstar Chow Yun-fat, Oscar-winner Mira Sorvino and Screen Actors Guild Award "Best Actor" winner Clifton Collins Jr. Other musical artists on the soundtrack included; The Crystal Method, Talvin Singh, Tricky, Death in Vegas, Hed PE, and Brad.
