= Alma da Rua =

Street art gallery in São Paulo, Brazil

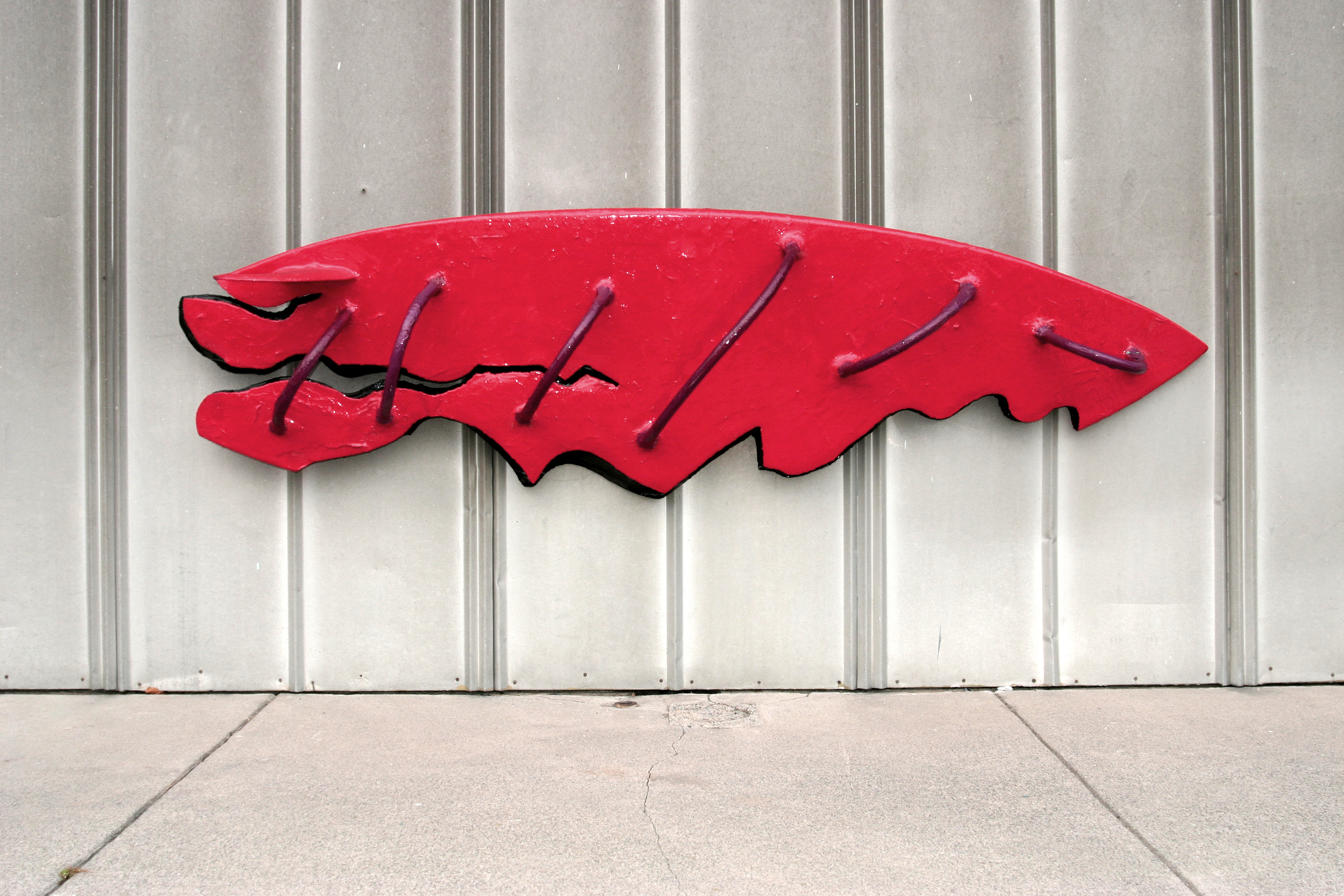
- Prancha Reencarnada by Ithaka
- Status: active
- Genre: Street art, experimental art
- Frequency: monthly
- Country: Brazil
- Founder: Tito Bertolucci
- People: Atomik, Bonga Mac, Chivitz, Ithaka, Onurb (Bruno Paes), André Mogle, Mari Pavanelli, Gatuno, Puga, Magmor, Subtu, Pardal, and Elvis Mourão
- Website: galeriaalmadarua.com.br

Alma da Rua is a duo of Brazilian graffiti and street art galleries in São Paulo, Brazil, created and curated by Tito Bertolucci (1974-2026). Exhibitions have included Brazilian and international artists, including Atomik (Miami Style Gods), Bonga Mac, Chivitz, Ithaka, and Onurb (Bruno Paes).

Alma da Rua I is located at Rua Gonçalo Afonso 96, Jardim das Bandeiras (23°33′23″S 46°41′10″W), while Alma da Rua II (opened in 2022) is located at Rua Medeiros de Albuquerque 188, Jardim das Bandeiras (23°33′22″S 46°41′09″W). Both spaces are located in the Vila Madalena area of São Paulo.

== Selected exhibitions ==
- Onurb, Punk Love (curated by Tito Bertolucci and Lara Pap)
- Bonga Mac, Olho Cru (curated by Pardal and Ceres Macedo)
- Ithaka (Ithaka Darin Pappas), Pranchas Reencarnadas, from The Reincarnation of a Surfboard (curated by Tito Bertolucci e Fernando Bari)

== International participation ==
In 2025, gallery Alma de Rua presented eight of its Brazilian artists at SPERA international urban art event at the Beffroi de Montrouge in Paris. Artists were André Mogle, Mari Pavanelli, Gatuno, Puga, Magmor, Subtu, Pardal, and Elvis Mourão. Gallerist Tito Bertolucci spoke of the gallery's first international representation of Brazilian street artists: "Estamos muito animados e ansiosos por esse momento. O Brasil, e mais ainda São Paulo, como celeiro natural do graffiti no mundo, me dá certeza de que será um sucesso. Espero que os europeus admirem nossa história e arte ..." ["We are very excited and looking forward to this moment. Brazil, and even more so São Paulo, as a natural hub for graffiti in the world, gives me certainty that it will be a success. I hope that Europeans will admire our history and art ..."]
