= Hip-hop tuga =

Music genre or scene

- Stylistic origins: Hip-hop; funk; jazz; soul; reggae; folk
- Cultural origins: Early 1990s, Almada (Portugal) and former colonies of the Portuguese Empire: Mozambique, Angola, Cape Verde, São Tomé and Príncipe, Guinea-Bissau

Subgenres
- Jazz rap

Other topics
- Underground hip-hop; Turntablism; Alternative music

Portuguese hip-hop (Portuguese: Hip-hop português), more commonly called hip-hop tuga ("tuga" here being slang for "Portuguese"), is the Portuguese variety of hip-hop. It differs from mainstream hip-hop because it has strong influences from African music, from Lusophone Africa, reggae, zouk and fado.

Artists such as Valete, Lancelot and Sam the Kid are among the most popular. Old school Portuguese hip-hop artists include General D, Chullage, Boss AC, Mind Da Gap, Dealema, Fuse, Mundo Segundo, Regula, Da Weasel, Allen Halloween and Sir Scratch.

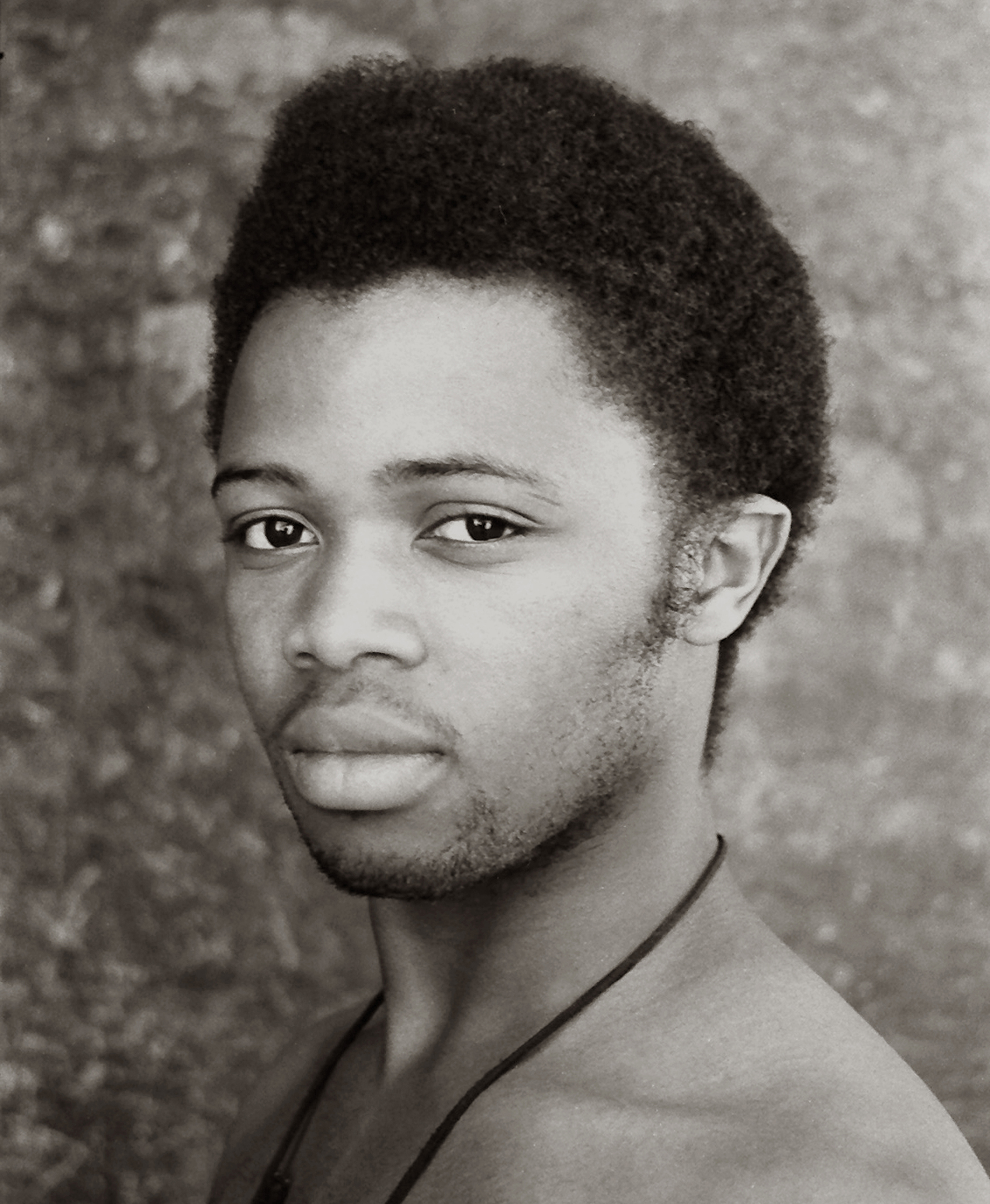
General D the godfather of Portuguese hip hop in Lisbon, Portugal 1993.

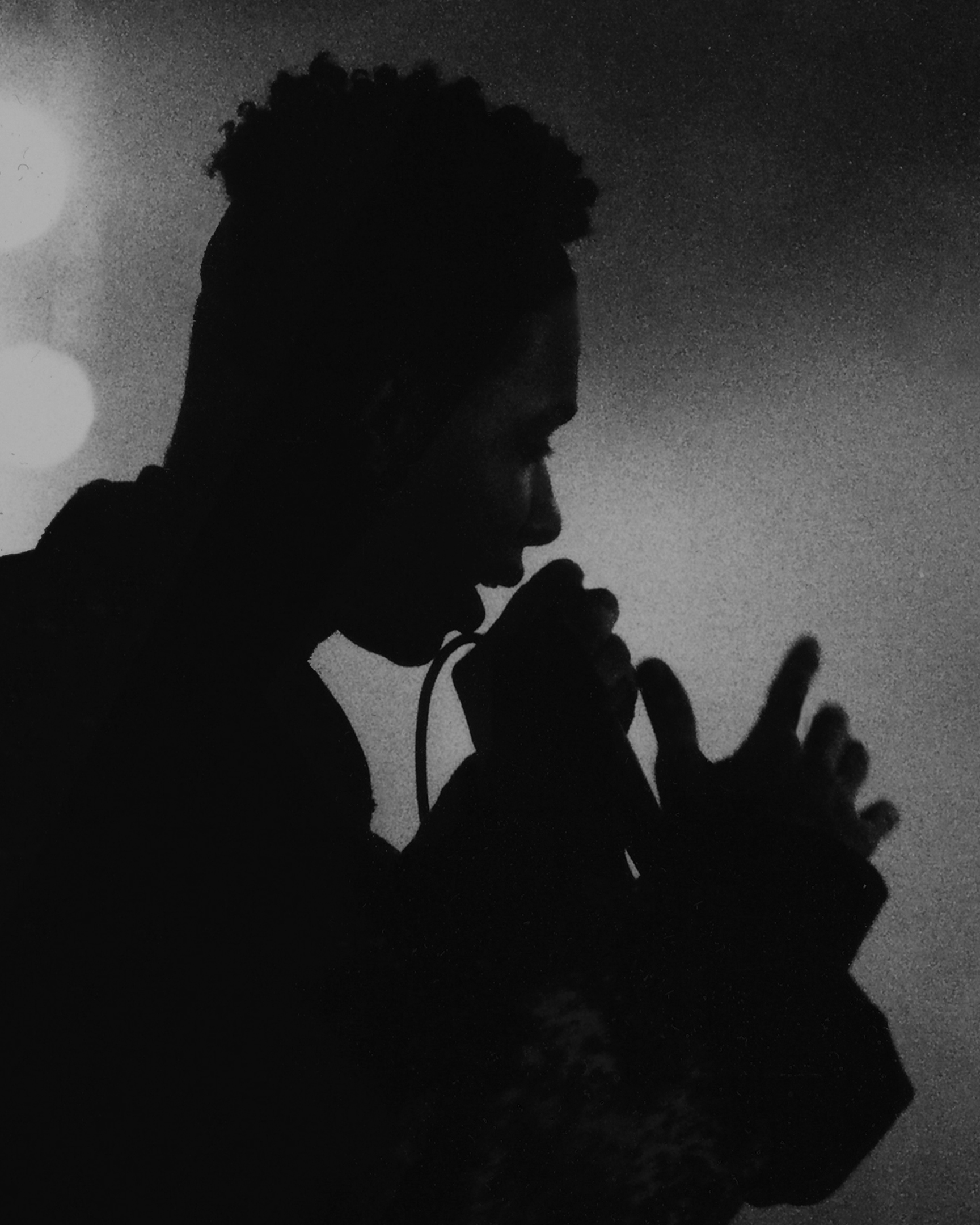
Lisbon-based Cape Verdean Portuguese rapper Boss AC during a live performance in 1994.

The founder of hip-hop tuga was rapper General D. Born in Maputo, Mozambique, General D moved to Lisbon at a young age and, even though he held a Portuguese passport and was heavily influenced by American rap, he always merged his music with his own Mozambican roots. He was the first rap-oriented artist of any kind to have a legitimate recording contract in Portugal. In 1994, he signed with Valentim de Carvalho, a Portuguese division of EMI Records, with whom he recorded two albums: Pé Na Tchôn, Karapinha Na Céu (1995) and Kanimabo (1997). Intelligent and charismatic, the general public and media liked General D., even though his lyrics were often very anti-establishment.

Californian hip-hop artist and poet Ithaka (also known as: Ithaka Darin Pappas) is often included in the hip-hop tuga community because he lived and recorded in Lisbon during 1992-1998 and was among the first wave of artists working with hip-hop in Portugal. There he completed his first two (of eight) albums; Flowers and the Color of Paint (1995) and Stellafly (1997). His 1995 song "Escape from the City of Angels" (featuring Lisbon's Marta Dias) was included in the soundtrack of Antoine Fuqua's U.S. feature film directorial debut The Replacement Killers (Columbia Pictures) starring Chow Yun Fat, Mira Sorvino, Clifton Collins Jr. and Michael Rooker. The song also appeared on the show Good Girl's Don't on Oprah Winfrey's Oxygen Channel.

In a 2017 article in Rimas e Batidas titled "Os Álbuns Mais caros Do Hip Hop Português" ("The Most Expensive Portuguese Hip Hop Albums"), the journalist Hugo Jorge explains that the most sought after and used hip-hop tuga records were made by Da Weasel, Fuse, Orelha Negra, Mind Da Gap, Micro, XEG, Mundo Segundo, Dealema and DJ Bomberjack.

The new school rapper Piruka has the most watched hip-hop tuga song on YouTube, which is "Se Eu Não Acordar Amanhã".

== History Of Hip Hop Tuga Concert 2019 ==
On March 8, 2019, a large concert took place called "A História Do Hip-Hop Tuga" (The History of Portuguese Hip Hop) at the Altice Arena, part of the Parque das Nações complex, in Lisbon. The show, produced by Música no Coração, featured many of the founding fathers of hip-hop in Portugal, many with their roots directly from Africa. Performers included General D, Boss AC, Black Company, Chullage, NBC e Sir Scratch.
