= Wavelength (game) =

Party game published in 2019

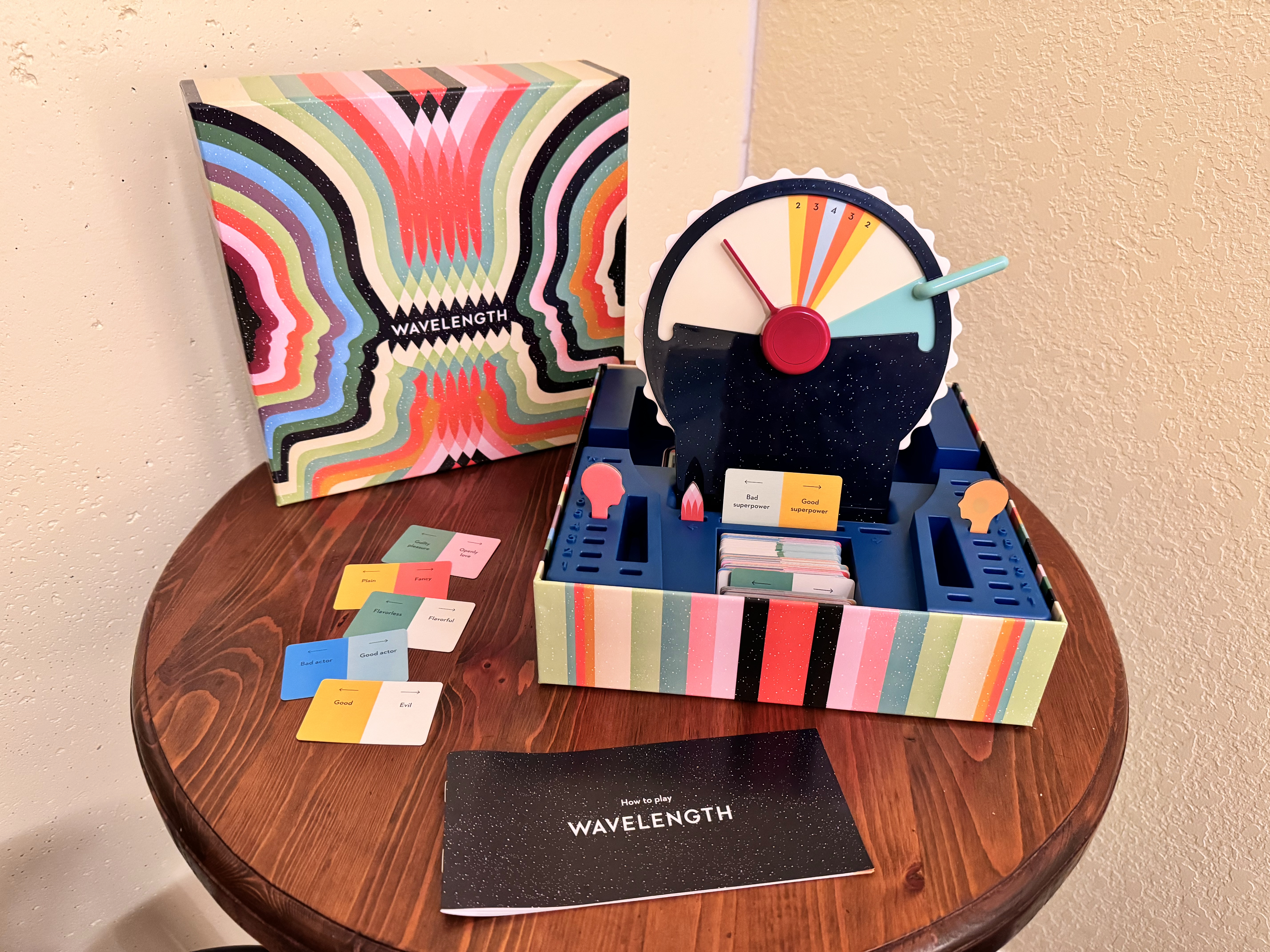
- Designers: Alex Hague; Justin Vickers; Wolfgang Warsch
- Illustrators: Sofie Hannibal; Nan Na Hvass
- Publishers: CMYK (formerly Palm Court)
- Publication: 2019; 7 years ago
- Genres: Party game
- Players: 2–12
- Playing time: 30–45 minutes
- Age range: 14+

Wavelength is a party game designed by Alex Hague, Justin Vickers, and Wolfgang Warsch and published in 2019 by CMYK following a successful Kickstarter campaign. Two teams compete to earn points over multiple rounds by guessing the locations of a hidden target on a custom device based on clues relating to a chosen scale that are given by a player called the "Psychic".

== Publishing history ==
Wavelength was designed by Alex Hague, Justin Vickers, and Wolfgang Warsch. It was originally released as a Kickstarter campaign that raised over US$300,000 in funding from around 9,000 backers. Following this, Wavelength was published by Hague and Vickers' game publishing company, Palm Court (later renamed to CMYK), in 2019. In 2022, a free mobile version of the game was released to the app store.

In 2024, a simplified, spoken-word version of the game played without the Wavelength device became a trend on TikTok.

== Gameplay ==
Wavelength is played with a deck of Spectrum cards, each listing two extremes at opposite ends of a spectrum (such as hot and cold), and with a custom device that has a point tracker, a dial on the outside, and a sliding hatch which opens to reveal a wheel with five small radial slices of different colours acting as the target range.

Players are divided into two teams and a player from the starting team is elected the "Psychic". The Psychic spins the device's wheel with the sliding hatch closed and secretly notes the position of the target range. A Spectrum card is then drawn and the Psychic gives a clue that suggests the location of the target slice on that spectrum. The Psychic's team attempt to interpret the clue and turn the dial to the location they guess it to be indicating. The opposing team then predicts whether they believe the guess to be to the left or to the right of the actual location. Once all guesses have been made, the sliding hatch is opened and the correct location of the target range is revealed.

Points are awarded to the Psychic's team based on how close to the correct location their guess was. If the opposing team's prediction was correct, one point is deducted from the other team's awarded points. The opposing team then chooses their Psychic for the next round and the game continues. The first team to reach 10 points is the winner.

== Reception ==
Wirecutter listed Wavelength as one of their Best Board Games of 2022, praising it for its design and ability to inspire interesting conversations about players's perceptions. Charlie Theel, writing for Dicebreaker, described the game as "unmistakable brilliance" and "the best party game since Codenames" for its unique set up and interesting gameplay, but did note that "the element of downtime, for both teams, is the biggest criticism of Wavelength." In a review for Polygon, Clayton Ahsley stated that "Wavelength might be one of the best party games we’ve played," praising the game for its replayability and design. The Strategist listed the game as the "Best adult board game for game night". The Guardian included Wavelength as one their picks for the best board games for Christmas parties, with Keith Stuart emphasizing that "it’s difficult to explain, but really fun for a creative group who all know each other well." IGN included the game in a list of the best board games for large games, describing it as a "fun, fresh challenge" that can be enjoyed and easily replayed by people of all tastes and ages. Martha Alexander, writing for The Independent, rated the game 7/10, praising it for its visual design but describing it as "pretty intense experience" that works best with larger amounts of players.

Wavelength was the winner of the 2022 Årets Spill Best Party Game award. It was also one of the American Tabletop Awards 2020 Recommended Casual Games and was nominated for the Board Game Quest Awards 2019 Best Party Game award.
