= Saber (artist) =

American graffiti artist

- Born: Ryan Weston Shook; 1976 (age 49–50); Glendale, California, U.S.
- Education: San Francisco Art Institute
- Known for: Graffiti; Social commentary Spray paint art
- Notable work: Los Angeles River Mural
- Movement: Street art

An example of Saber's graffiti.

Saber is an American graffiti artist and muralist.

== Career ==
Saber has painted in the Los Angeles area and in San Francisco, and was interviewed by Juxtapoz Art & Culture Magazine in July 2007.

He is known for a large piece he painted on the concrete bank of the Los Angeles River in 1997. Known not only for its size, Saber's LA River piece was complex and remained at the site for 12 years. In 2004, Saber recreated the piece in a diorama of the river for the Natural History Museum of Los Angeles County exhibit, L.A.: light / motion / dreams. In 2007, the piece was included in the KCET project Departures: LA River.

In 2009, he attracted public controversy for a video submission to a Democratic National Committee contest that featured a mural of an American flag overlaid with health-care graffiti, drawing national coverage and criticism desecrating the flag.

In protest of a mural moratorium he hired five skywriters as an art in 2011. Saber told KCET that the project was mostly funded by himself but that other artists, like Shepard Fairey, helped with the undisclosed amount.
