= 01 Gallery =

Art gallery in Los Angeles

01 Gallery (or Zero One Gallery) is a contemporary art gallery located in downtown Los Angeles, California, U.S., founded by art dealer and curator John Pochna. The gallery is known for its contributions to the lowbrow art movement, as it frequently exhibits pieces with heavy graffiti and street art influences. In April 2007, Pochna partnered with Brandon Coburn, and Jim Ulrich.

In August 1980, Mark Cameron Boyd AKA Wayzata Camerone, an artist and musician with Los Angeles punk-funk band The Brainiacs, co-founded the Zero Zero Club with Pochna; the club's name was taken from the Mickey Spillane pulp novel "My Gun Is Quick." The Zero Zero Club was originally an after-hours bar on Caheunga Blvd. in Hollywood that exhibited local artists' and musicians' artworks curated by either Boyd and Pochna. Their partnership disbanded in 1981, with Boyd opening up a new Zero Zero Gallery in West Hollywood, while Pochna moved his 01 Gallery to Melrose. The gallery's current name derives from a conceptual understanding of the creative process. As Kyle Lina explains, "Zero is when there's nothing--one when there's something. The space between the zero and the one is the creative act".

Over time, 01 Gallery developed a long standing relationship with the Los Angeles punk community, as it has debuted bands such as The Screamers. As the gallery's clientele diversified, Pochna's aims for the gallery evolved. Pochna states, "[We're] not a punk rock gallery, not a graffiti art gallery, not a rebel gallery. Not any of those stupid names they used to call us."

01 Gallery has been frequented by Los Angeles residents such as Raymond Pettibon, David Lee Roth, Tomata du Plenty and John Belushi. This diverse clientele has led 01 Gallery to be thought of as analogous to Andy Warhol's Factory. "Its eccentric mix of artists and patrons made it [Los Angeles'] answer to the Factory, though the creations were more 'lowbrow' than pop."

The gallery opened with works by Robert Williams, Tomata du Plenty and Saber. It has also exhibited Anthony Ausgang., Raymond Pettibon, Gomez Bueno, Walter Robinson, Richard Hambleton, Futura 2000 and Fred Tomaselli.

Notable past curators include Walter Hopps and Carlo McCormick.

== Trivia ==
Soon after the gallery's naissance, Pochna allowed the gallery's Melrose address to be used as a business address for an escort service in order to fund the gallery.

An exhibition at Zero One Gallery is documented in The Devil and Daniel Johnston. Pochna is interviewed in the film.

The gallery's Melrose space was rumored to be haunted by the ghosts of Joan Crawford, Rock Hudson, and Rita Hayworth.
