= International Surfing Museum =

Museum in California

Coordinates: 33.65918°N 118.0008°W

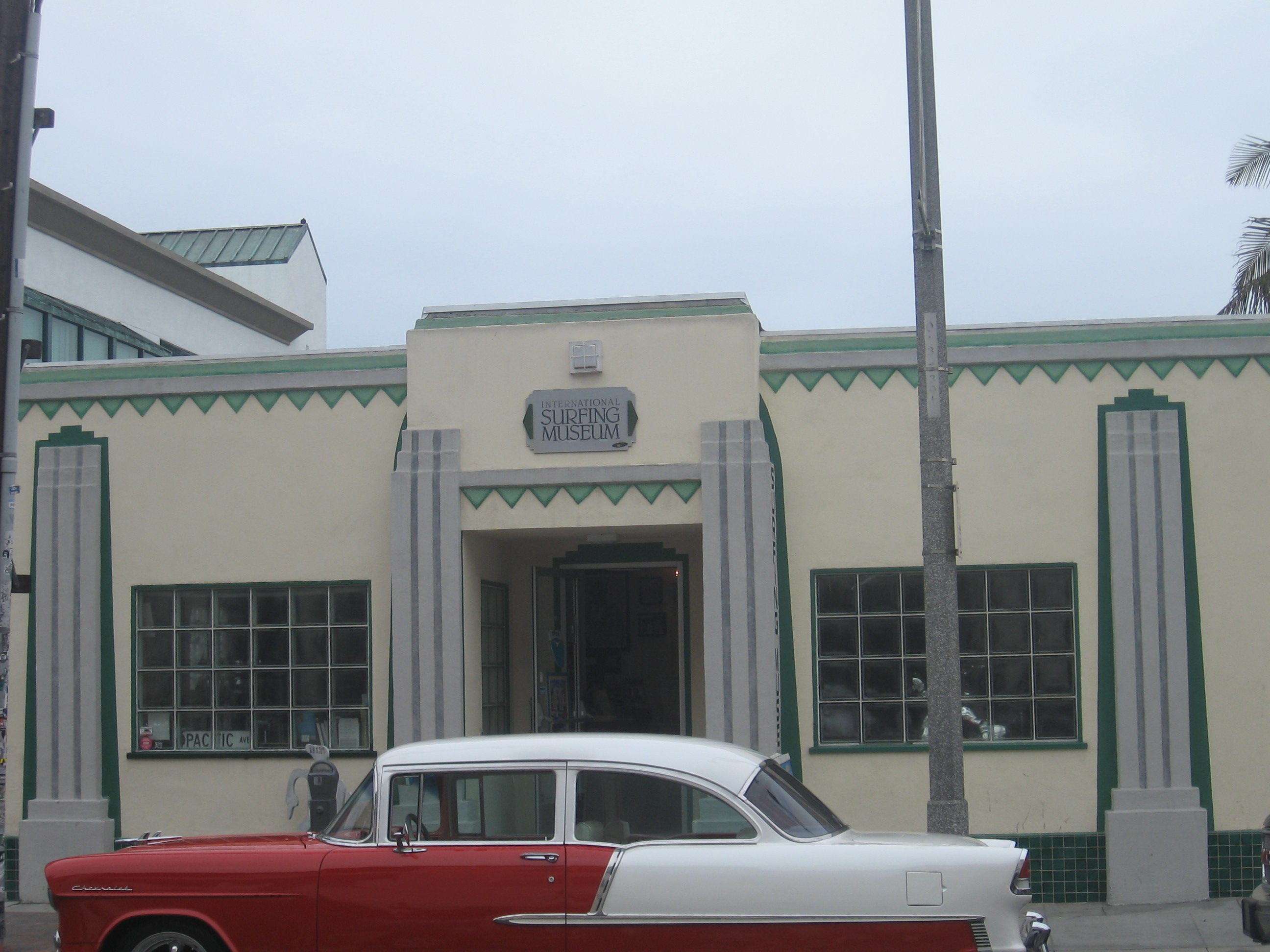
- Established: 1987
- Location: Huntington Beach, California
- Director: Diana Dehm
- Website: www.huntingtonbeachsurfingmuseum.org

The International Surfing Museum is a non-profit, 501(c) museum in Huntington Beach, Orange County, California. The museum's goal is to preserve the history of the surfing culture throughout the globe. It is dedicated to Duke Kahanamoku, who is generally regarded as the person who popularized the modern sport of surfing.

The International Surfing Museum displays historic surfboards, provides information about legendary surfers, and shows classic surf films. Visitors can examine surfing sculptures and hear surf music.

The museum was established in 1987 by Ann Beasley and Natalie Kotsch. It moved from Walnut Street to 411 Olive Avenue in June 1990. In 1998 Ann Beasley and Natalie Kotsch were added to the Honor Roll, which "was created to honor those individuals who have contributed to surfing and it's [sic] culture and are deserving of recognition, but might not qualify to receive a stone on the [Surfing] Walk of Fame. Honor Roll recipients are selected by the Surfing Walk of Fame Board of Directors."

The city council approved moving the museum into extra space in the library building in March 2026.
