= Wavelength (magazine) =

Surfing or kayaking magazine

Multiple publications exist under the name Wavelength.

- Wavelength is a worldwide surfing magazine published since 1981 by 10 Over Surf Ltd, based in Newquay, South West England. 10 Over Surf Ltd also owns 10 Over Surf Shop https://10oversurf.com
- Wavelength Magazine is a sea kayaking magazine published on Vancouver Island, British Columbia, Canada, with distribution throughout Canada and the United States and available free online. The Canadian magazine was founded in 1991 on Gabriola Island, British Columbia, and is now published in Nanaimo.
