= São Paulo Museum of Image and Sound =

Museum in São Paulo, Brazil

Coordinates: 23.5726°S 46.6762°W

Museu da Imagem e do Som de São Paulo
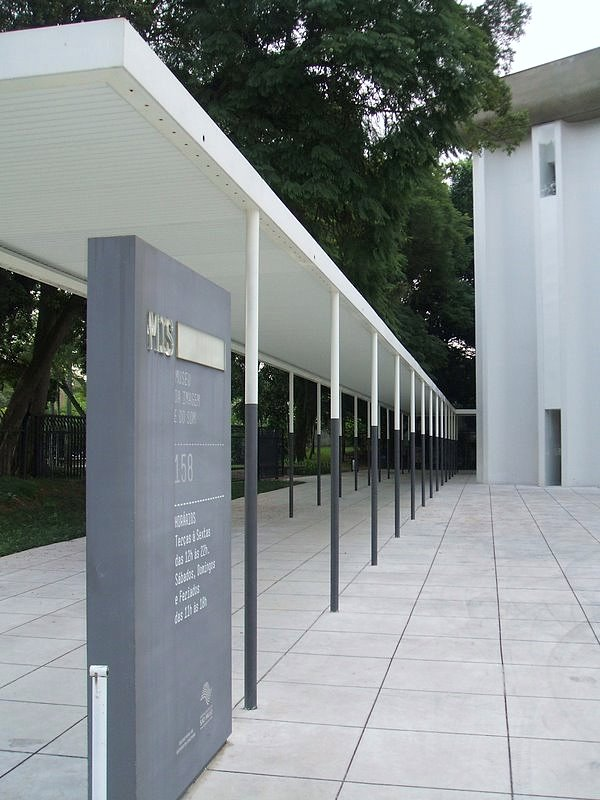
- Established: 1970
- Location: São Paulo, Brazil
- Director: pt:Daniela Bousso
- Website: www.mis-sp.org.br/

The São Paulo Museum of Image and Sound (in Portuguese, Museu da Imagem e do Som de São Paulo, or MIS) is a public museum of audio-visual works, established in 1970, and located in São Paulo, Brazil. The museum was founded as a result of a project conducted in the 1960s by Brazilian intellectuals, such as Ricardo Cravo Albin, Paulo Emílio Salles Gomes and Rudá de Andrade, with the purpose of endowing the country with institutions devoted to studying and documenting works of the new media that had been ignored by traditional museums.

The museum is housed in a 5,000 square meters building in Pinheiros district, inaugurated in 1975. During the 1970s and 1980s, the museum had an active role, as a center of artistic diffusion, and education-related activities, becoming an important reference for studies on the Brazilian audio-visual production.

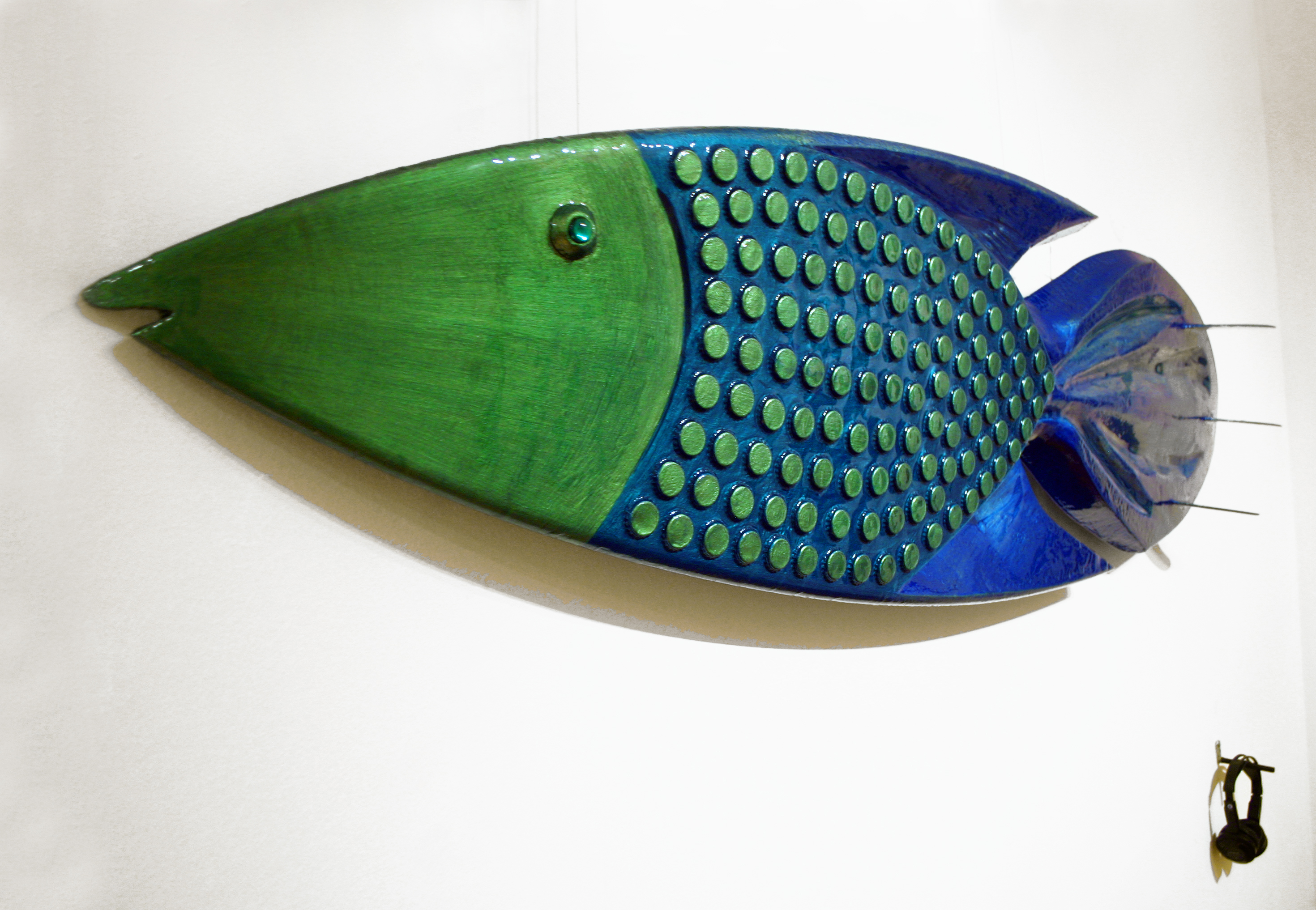
"LURE #3" a recycled-surfboard sculpture by Californian artist Ithaka Darin Pappas as exhibited during Festival Alma Surf hosted by São Paulo Museum of Image and Sound.

The museum's collection includes more than 350,000 entries. It comprises films (shorts, features, and documentaries), videos, records, photographs, works of graphic design, etc. The museum keeps an important program of transcription and documentation of oral tradition and the LabMIS, a research and production center for new media with an artist-in-residence program.

== See also ==
- List of music museums
- São Paulo Museum of Art
- Museum of Contemporary Art, University of São Paulo
- Museum of the Portuguese Language
- Rio de Janeiro Museum of Image and Sound
- Ema Gordon Klabin Cultural Foundation
