= Steve Zeldin =

Steve J. Zeldin
- Born: Steven Zeldin; November 7, 1963 (age 62); Chicago, Illinois, United States
- Education: University Of Southern California
- Occupations: Publisher; Editor, Journalist, Photographer
- Known for: Editor-in-chief of Wave Action Magazine,Water Magazine, Foam magazine and Chief Creative Officer of Blue Water Publishing.

Steve Zeldin is an American magazine publisher, editor and journalist most active within the surfing and extreme sports world. He was the original editor of the long-running magazine Transworld Surf and was the founder and publisher of several surf-oriented publications based in the Southern California area; Beach Happy, International Surf, Water and Foam.

As a journalist, he has contributed to magazines such as Raygun and Esquire and has interviewed several of surfing's most iconic names including Tom Curren, Andy Irons, Taylor Knox, and Kelly Slater.

He is currently associated with the surf lifestyle quarterly What Youth and its sister publication Herewith (along with business partners Danny Kwock and Preston Murray).
