= General D =

Portuguese rapper (born 1971)

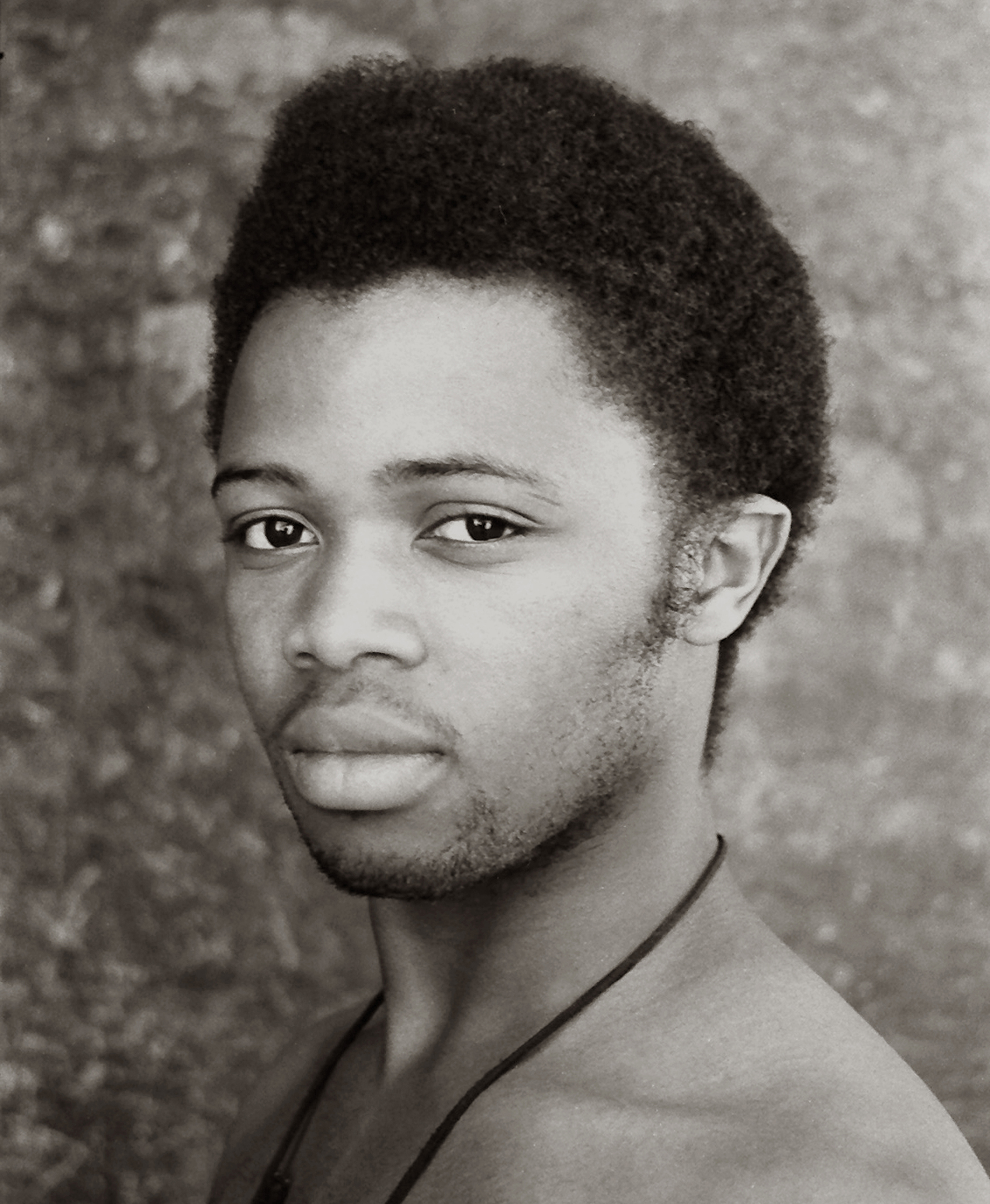
- General D in Lisbon, early 1990s

Background information
- Born: Sergio Matsinhe; 28 October 1971 (age 54); Maputo, Mozambique
- Genres: World music, Hip hop
- Occupations: vocalist, lyricist, songwriter
- Instrument: Vocals
- Years active: 1992–present
- Labels: EMI, Valentim de Carvalho

General D is a rapper, Hip hop tuga and World music artist. Being the first rapper in Portugal to sign a major record deal, he is considered the Godfather Of Portuguese Hip Hop. Although largely influenced by big name U.S. rap acts such as Public Enemy, Ice Cube and Ice-T, his music carried a distinct African flavor incorporating many live tribal percussion instruments. He recorded two solo albums for EMI-Valentim de Carvalho and has also appeared as a guest on other artists' releases including; Ithaka, Cool Hipnoise, Água d'Amanhã and Pop Dell'Arte.

== Early life ==
General D (Sergio Matsinhe) was born in Maputo (then Lourenço Marques) the capital city of the Mozambique, (a former Portuguese colony), his family immigrated to Barreiro on the southern shore of the Tagus river near Lisbon, Portugal when he was two years old. As a youth he competed in Track and field events and set regional records for both the 100-meter dash and the 4 × 100 metres relay.

== Early career ==
In 1990, at the age of nineteen, General D was one of the organizers of the very first rap festival in Portugal. The event was held at the Sociedade Filarmónica Incrível Almadense, in Almada. There, he presented the rap group Black Company (of which he was one of the founding members) and also the project, Africa Power. He also performed with his first band along with co-members, singer Maimuna Jalles and the rapper, Lince.

In 1991 he made his first studio recording as a guest vocalists and lyricist on the track "MC Holy" by the Portuguese new-wave band, Pop dell'Arte for their album, Ready-Made.

It was through the TV program, Lentes de Contacto (produced by Latina Europa), where General D met composer/producer Tiago Lopes who in 1993 invited him to record the track "Norte Sul" for the film, Até amanhã, Mário (See You Tomorrow Mario). This gained the attention of several Portuguese record labels and General D eventually signed a multiple-album deal with Valentim de Carvalho, a local sub-division of EMI Records.

In 1994 he released the controversial EP "PortuKKKal É Um Erro" (Portugal is Error), lyrically shedding light on Portugal's previously hidden racism. The attention derived from this record frequently got General D invited to primetime television talk shows, to discuss the problems of African immigrants to Portugal, from the former Portuguese colonies

In 1995, he released his first full-length album "Pé na Tchôn, Karapinha Na Céu", recorded with a group live African musicians, known as Os Karapinhas. The first single was "Black Magic Woman" (featuring Sam). The song's well-produced video was a favorite on MTV Portugal at the time, leading to many opportunities for live performances.

In 1997, General D released his second album "Kanimambo". It was produced by Joe Fossard and recorded at Regiestúdio in Lisbon and featured several guest performers including the legendary António Chainho on Portuguese Guitar for the song, "Hora Di Bai". Nuno Guerreiro contributed vocals on a politically oriented track entitled, "Xanana Gusmão". The percussionist, Netos Do N'Gumbé performed on the song, "Respeito". Lyrics for the song, "Rappi Ta Doddo" were written by Brazilian superstar Gabriel O Pensador. And singer Marta Dias and Californian rapper/lyricist Ithaka appeared on the song, "Ekos do Passado". General D toured extensively with this album nationally and also performed in Spain and France.

== Disappearance From Portugal ==
A few years later, General D then spent several months in Jamaica preparing his third album with legendary reggae duo Sly and Robbie (as producers), but the disc was never released by EMI-Valentim de Carvalho and until this day has never been heard by the public. In the years that followed, General D went missing. Rumors circulated on the rapper's whereabout, but were never confirmed until 2014.

== Reappearance And Career Comeback ==
After eventually being tracked down by acclaimed writer and culture journalist, Vitor Belanciano in London, General D gave an exclusive interview to Belanciano for an issue of Ipsilon Magazine, a supplement of the Portuguese newspaper, Público. General D confessed that he had seen hard times abroad mostly living in London, and at one point was even cleaning the streets in New York City. He appeared on the cover of that issue of the magazine, an exposure that brought about many reunions in the music industry.

In 2015, a double-disc release featuring both of his studio albums, Pé na Tchôn, Karapinha Na Céu and Kanimambo were released by his original label EMI-Valentim de Carvalho. And General D finally returned to the stages that had defined his early career.

On 8 March 2019 a large concert took place called "A História Do Hip-Hop Tuga" (The History of Portuguese Hip Hop) at the Altice Arena, part of the Parque das Nações complex, just outside of Lisbon (he site of the former Expo'98). The show, produced by Música no Coração, featured many of the founding fathers of hip hop in Portugal, many with their roots directly from Africa. Performers included; General D, Boss AC, Black Company, Chullage, NBC e Sir Scratch.

== Album Cover Art ==
The photographs on the covers, back covers and cd booklets of all General D's releases (and even the image for his 2014 cover issue of Ipsilon Magazine) were made by his personal friend, the recording artist, sculptor and hip hop photographer Ithaka Darin Pappas, a Californian who had lived in Lisbon during the formation period of Hip hop tuga. Before moving to Portugal in 1992, Ithaka had previously been working in Los Angeles with artists such as Eazy E, N.W.A. and Ice Cube for Priority Records.

== Albums ==
- 1995 General D & Os Karapinhas – "Pé Na Tchôn, Karapinha Na Céu" – Label: EMI-Valentim de Carvalho
- 1997 General D "Kanimambo" – Label: EMI-Valentim de Carvalho
- 2015 [Re-Release] Kanimambo and Pé Na Tchôn, Karapinha Na Céu" (Double-Album Special Edition)

== Singles ==
- 1994 General D "PortukKKKal" – Label: EMI-Valentim de Carvalho
- 1996 General D (feat. Sam) "Black Magik Woman" – Label: EMI-Valentim de Carvalho
- 1997 General D "Rappi Ta Doddo" – Label: EMI-Valentim de Carvalho
- 1997 General D "Estado De Sítio (O Ke É Ke Se Passa)" Label: EMI-Valentim de Carvalho

== Guest appearances On Other Artists' Songs ==
- 1992 "MC Holy" Pop Dell'Arte feat. General D – Album: Ready-Made /Label: Variodisc
- 1995 "Soldadinho" Cool Hipnoise feat. General D – Album: Nascer Do Soul / Label: Nortesul
- 1995 "Erase the Slate Of Hate" Ithaka feat. General D – Album: Flowers And The Color Of Paint – Label: Fábrica De Sons
- 1998 "Regadinho" Água d'Amanhã feat. General D
