= Blitz (Portuguese magazine) =

Portuguese popular culture website/magazine

- Categories: Music website/magazine
- Founded: 1 November 1984; 41 years ago
- Company: Impresa Group
- Country: Portugal
- Based in: Paço de Arcos
- Language: Portuguese
- Website: https://expresso.pt/blitz

Blitz is a Portuguese media brand that focus on popular music and pop culture, based in Paço de Arcos. Since February 2018, the brand is present only on digital media and sporadic, special printed editions. Between November 1984 and April 2006, Blitz took the form of a weekly newspaper. Later, between June 2006 and January 2018, Blitz was issued as a monthly magazine. It was one of the earliest music publications in Portugal.

== History and profile ==
Blitz was founded in November 1984. The magazine is based in Lisbon and is published by Medipress.

In July 1992, it was acquired by Impresa, which gave the magazine access to more advanced technology, like color treatment. In June 2006, Blitz began to be published on a monthly basis.

The 2004 circulation of Blitz was about 20,000 copies. Its circulation was 16,000 copies in 2007. The magazine had a circulation of 16,344 copies in 2010 and 14,008 in 2011. The circulation of the magazine was 10,648 copies in 2012.

In late 2017, Impresa announced that the regular (i.e., monthly) publication of Blitz would cease to exist and that the Blitz brand would still be present in the form of its website and special, non-monthly editions of the magazine. It is expected that there would be published at least three special editions of the magazine in 2018. Since 2018, Blitz and Expresso are the only printed publications owned by Impresa.

== See also ==
- List of magazines in Portugal
