= Público (Portugal) =

Portuguese daily newspaper

- Type: Daily newspaper
- Format: Tabloid
- Owner: Sonae.com
- Editor: David Pontes
- Founded: 5 March 1990; 36 years ago
- Political alignment: Centre
- Headquarters: Lisbon and Porto
- Circulation: 28,360 (September–October 2013)
- ISSN: 0872-1548
- Website: www.publico.pt

Público (Portuguese pronunciation: [ˈpuβliku]; English: Public) is a Portuguese daily national newspaper of record published in Lisbon, Portugal.

== History and profile ==
Público was first published on 5 March 1990. The paper was founded by Sonae, and is owned by the Sonae group. In 1992 Italian media company Repubblica International Holding SA, a subsidiary of Gruppo Editoriale L'Espresso, acquired 16.75% of the paper.

Público is published in tabloid format and has its headquarters in Lisbon. The paper is known as a publication of the French school with extensive texts and few illustrations. Its first editor-in-chief was Vicente Jorge Silva, formerly sub-editor-in-chief at Expresso. José Manuel Fernandes also served as the editor-in-chief of the paper. Since 2009 Bárbara Reis has served as the editor-in-chief.

Público is one of the first Portuguese mainstream newspapers to have an online edition which was started in 1995. Its online edition was free and included almost all the articles from the print edition, except for the pictures. In 2005 it changed from a fully free-access to a subscription model. In 2006, the HTML version of the current day's edition became free again, while the other contents, such as the PDF version (only for subscribers), enhanced HTML version and access to past editions, are still subject to registration and subscription. The online edition of Público was named as Europe's online-medium of the year in 2013.

The paper was awarded the European Newspaper of the Year in the category of nationwide newspapers by European Newspapers Congress in 2014. The current editorial line is outspokenly pro-Europeanist. The paper is considered as a newspaper of record for Portugal (along with Diário de Notícias).

== Circulation ==
The circulation of the paper was 58,000 copies in 2003, making it the fourth best selling newspaper in the country. In 2005, the paper had a circulation of 46,111 copies. In 2006, the circulation was 41,706 copies. In 2007 it was the fourth best-selling Portuguese newspaper with a circulation of 42,000 copies. Its 2008 circulation was 42,527 copies. The paper had a circulation of 38,229 copies in 2009 and 35,137 copies in 2010. The circulation of the paper was 33,159 copies in 2011. The circulation was 28,360 copies between September and October 2013.

== Brands ==
- P2
- Ípsilon
- Fugas
- P3
- Ímpar
- Guia do Lazer
- Inimigo Público
- Cinecartaz

== Discontinued supplements and sections ==
- Público Junior
- Economia
- Digital

== See also ==
- List of newspapers in Portugal
