= David Fonseca =

Portuguese musician, singer-songwriter, and photographer (born 1973)

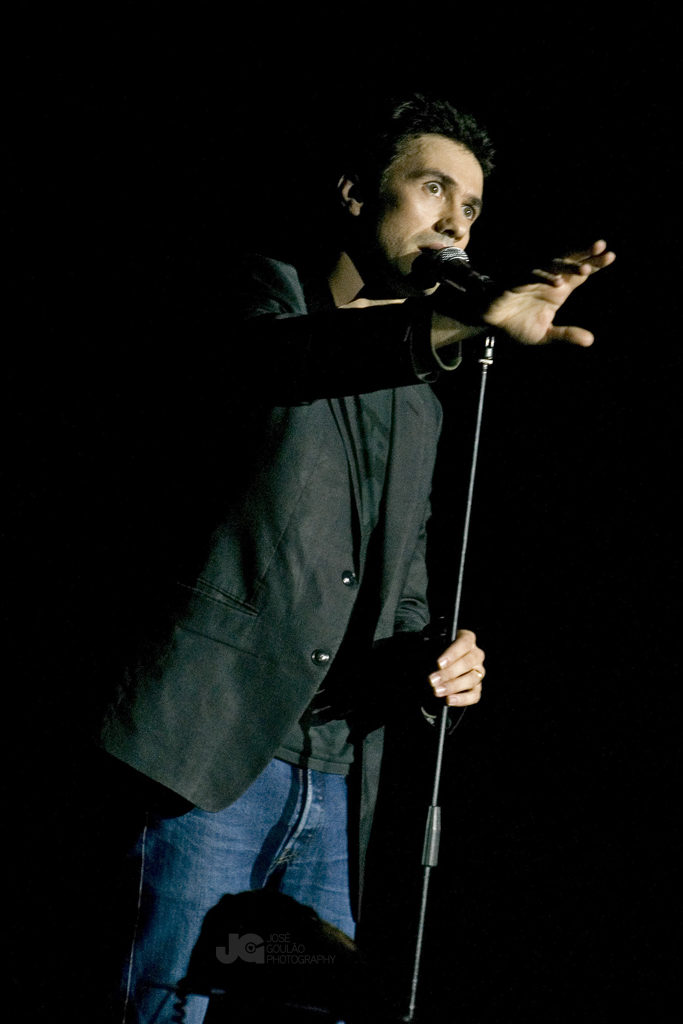

Background information
- Born: 14 June 1973 (age 52)
- Origin: Leiria, Portugal
- Genres: Alternative rock
- Occupation: Singer-songwriter
- Years active: 1998–present
- Labels: Universal, Castle of the Amazing Cats
- Website: David Fonseca official website

David Fonseca (Portuguese pronunciation: [dɐˈvið fõˈsekɐ], born on 14 June 1973, in Leiria) is a Portuguese musician, singer-songwriter, and photographer. As a musician, he plays several instruments, including acoustic guitar and organ. He is recognized for his successful music career as a member of Silence 4 and, since 2003, as a solo artist. He is also responsible for the graphic design of his album covers and the art direction on his video clips. Between 2004 and 2006, he was also part of the Humanos tribute project.

== Beginnings ==
David Fonseca studied cinema at the Lisbon Theatre and Film School (Escola Superior de Teatro e Cinema) where he attained a bachelor's degree. He also attended Escola Superior de Belas Artes de Lisboa between 1992 and 1994. David began his professional life as a photographer, working for various fashion catalogues. He participated in many exhibitions, both group and individual. He also worked in a radio station for a while. David Fonseca has dedicated his life to his love of music choosing to become a pop/rock alternative musician. He has multiple musical influences such as Sérgio Godinho, Jeff Buckley, The B-52's, Pixies, Roy Orbison, Aphex Twin and Ryan Adams, all of whom had a huge role in his musical creativity and individuality. He also mentioned in an interview with the radio station "Antena 3" that he has an addiction to the group Yeah Yeah Yeahs. David has a son and a daughter from his first marriage. On 27 December 2019, married the model, actress, and presenter Ana Sofia Martins.

== Career ==
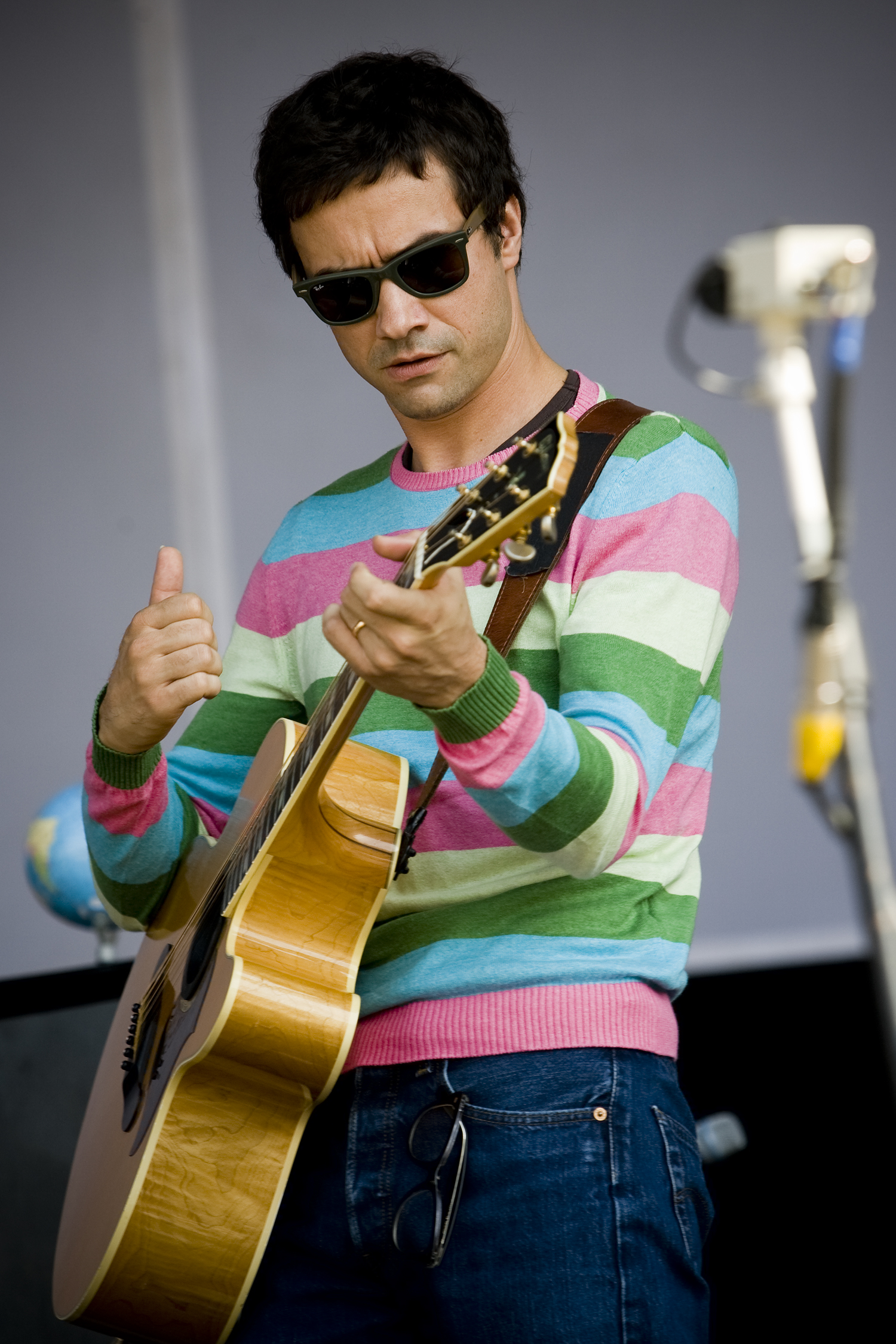
David Fonseca

=== Silence 4 ===
Fonseca's musical career started with a band called Silence 4, formed by a group of hometown friends. They first released the unpredictable Silence Becomes It, in June 1998 which was a huge success at the time, selling 250,000 copies (the equivalent to six platinum records). This was a remarkable achievement in the Portuguese musical scene, where it is usually difficult to sell these many copies. The album has only two songs written in Portuguese. One of them is "Sexto Sentido", featuring the popular Portuguese singer, Sérgio Godinho. To complete this great year for the band, which played at most of the Portuguese Summer festivals, they closed the world-famous exhibition Expo '98 in Lisbon, playing for about 50 thousand people. Later in the same year, in December, Silence 4 was the first national band to sell out at Pavilhão Atlântico, performing to an astonishing 18,000-strong crowd, only 6 months after the release of their first album. Two years after the "phenomenon" the second album was released, Only Pain Is Real, in July 2000, selling approximately 100,000 copies to this day. The respective tour ended in a double concert at the legendary stage in the Portuguese capital of Lisbon, the Coliseu dos Recreios, which sold out completely and was released later on in CD and DVD format. Throughout 2000, Silence 4 went on their last tour. In 2001, the band entered an undetermined hiatus, that still remains.

=== Solo career ===
Fonseca's solo career kicked off the 21st century with a different sound from Silence 4. In his first solo work Sing Me Something New, recorded in 2003, Fonseca sang and played nearly all the instruments, exploring a totally new environment of sounds on his own. The album was recorded in the studios of producer Mário Barreiros, and later in the Sterling Sound Studios in New York City, by the well-known sound engineer, George Marino, who participated in some of the recordings of Coldplay, the Rollins Band, The Dandy Warhols, and Sepultura, among many others. The first single was Someone That Cannot Love which debuted on about 150 Portuguese radio stations in a coordinated release: they were all played on 10 March at midnight. It soon reached #2 on the National Sales Chart and was certified Gold. The tour supporting this first record was extensive; it included many big music venues and large festivals across Portugal.

Our Hearts Will Beat As One, his second solo album, is said by Fonseca himself to be "scarily personal" and was only released in the fall of 2005 because of the other projects that Fonseca was involved in between his two albums. The first single was Who Are U?, described by Fonseca as "the song I always wanted to write". It reached No. 3 on the Portuguese charts. Our Hearts Will Beat As One was critically acclaimed by the media and was considered a pop album of the year in Portugal, even before the end of the year. The album went straight to No. 1 on the National Sales Chart and reached Gold status in its first week of sales.

In October 2007, his third original album, Dreams in Colour, was released and the first single was Superstars II, a song that obtained substantial airplay due to a cellphone campaign that adopted the single.

In July 2009, the first single ("A Cry 4 Love") was finally released to the public. The new album, Between Waves, was out on 2 November 2009. On the same day, Fonseca's online community, Amazing Cats Club started working.

Fonseca's fourth album entitled Seasons:Rising was released on 21 March 2012. The first single What Life Is For came up on 4 February 2012.

=== Humanos ===
In 2004, David joined a new project called Humanos. The idea behind it was to record some unpublished songs by a famous Portuguese artist, a singer-songwriter, from the 1980s, António Variações. David Fonseca, Manuela Azevedo (the lead singer of another Portuguese music group, Clã), Camané (one of the most famous Portuguese "fadistas"), Sérgio Nascimento (a member of Sérgio Godinho’s band), Hélder Gonçalves (also from Clã), Nuno Rafael and João Cardoso are the seven members of a group that would become a huge success, something unseen in the Portuguese music scene. The eponymous album scored an impressive quintuple platinum, staying for weeks at No. 1. "Muda de Vida", "Maria Albertina" and "Rugas" are just some of the group's hits.

All this culminated in three sold-out concerts, two of them in "Coliseu dos Recreios" (Lisbon) and the other in Porto. There was also another memorable performance, in front of a crowd of 40,000 people, at the "Sudoeste" Portuguese Festival, in the year 2005. The Humanos were always intended to be a short project because there were few unpublished António Variações’ songs. Thus, the CD and DVD with the recorded Coliseums’ live concerts, which were released in November 2006, marked the end of the Humanos project.

== Live concerts ==
David Fonseca is known for his powerful dancing on stage, equipped with his pair of Chuck Taylor All-Stars. He plays different instruments during the show and he is accompanied by his band, which includes: Sérgio Nascimento (drummer), Ricardo Fiel (guitarist), Rita Redshoes (ex-Atomic Bees in the piano and also voices; the second record single "Hold Still" is a David and Rita duet), Nuno Simões (bass player) and Paulo Pereira (Hammond). David does not just play his solo career hits but also lesser-known tracks. He also plays (in most of his live concerts) "Angel Song", the first music he wrote, and composed when he was only 18 and which was included in Silence 4's first album. This theme is perhaps the one most loved among fans, of the group or and David. In the middle of the show, he usually leaves the stage to return wearing a white suit, to announce that "dancing time" has begun and that the "moonwalk" move is near.

== Discography ==
=== Studio albums ===
as part of Silence 4

- 1998: Silence Becomes It
- 2000: Only Pain Is Real

as part of Humanos

- 2004: Humanos

Solo

Title	Album details	Peak chart positions
Title	Album details	POR
Sing Me Something New	Released: 2003; Label: Universal Music Portugal; Format: CD	2
Our Hearts Will Beat as One	Released: 24 October 2005; Label: Universal Music Portugal; Format: CD, digital download	1
Dreams in Colour	Released: 8 October 2007; Label: Universal Music Portugal; Format: CD, digital download	1
Between Waves	Released: 2 November 2009; Label: Universal Music Portugal; Format: CD, digital download	1
Seasons: Rising	Released: 21 March 2012; Label: Universal Music Portugal; Format: CD, digital download	3
Seasons: Falling	Released: 21 September 2012; Label: Universal Music Portugal; Format: CD, digital download	7
Futuro Eu	Released: 16 October 2015; Label: Universal Music Portugal; Format: CD, digital download	1
BOWIE 70	Released: 2017; Label: Universal Music Portugal; Format: CD, digital download	1
Radio Gemini	Released: 2018; Label: Universal Music Portugal; Format: CD, digital download	1

Others

Year	Title	Notes
2009	A Cry 4 Love	Vinyl EP
2012	Seasons – Rising:Falling	Double album re-release
2015	Christmas Songs	
2016	Futuro Eu – Outtakes	
2016	Sing Me Something New	Vinyl album

Christmas CDs

Year	Title
2009	Christmas 2009
2010	Christmas 2010
2011	Christmas 2011 DVD [Between Waves Tour @ Coliseu do Porto]
2012	Christmas 2012
2013	Christmas 2013
2014	Christmas 2014
2015	Christmas 2015
2016	Christmas 2016

=== Live albums ===
as part of Silence 4

- 2004: Ao Vivo - Coliseu dos Recreios
- 2014: SongBook Live 2014

as part of Humanos

- 2006: Humanos Ao Vivo

solo

Title	Album details	Peak chart positions
Title	Album details	POR
Dreams in Colour Live	Recorded: 12 April 2008 (Coliseu dos Recreios, Lisbon); Released: 2008; Label: Universal Music Portugal; Also released as DVD	1

=== Compilation albums ===
Title	Album details	Peak chart positions
Title	Album details	POR
Dreams in Colour: Tour Edition	Released: 11 February 2008; Label: Universal Music Portugal; Format: CD, Digital download	—

=== DVDs ===
- 2008: Dreams in Colour Live
- 2009: Streets of Lisbon - Acoustic Live Sessions (Bonus-DVD with Between Waves CD)
- 2011: Christmas 2011 DVD [Between Waves Tour @ Coliseu do Porto]

=== Singles ===
Title	Year	Peak chart positions	Album
Title	Year	POR	Album
"Someone That Cannot Love"	2003	—	Sing Me Something New
"The 80's"	2003	—	Sing Me Something New
"Who Are U?"	2005	—	Our Hearts Will Beat as One
"Hold Still" feat. Rita Redshoes	2006	—	Our Hearts Will Beat as One
"Our Hearts Will Beat as One"	2006	20	Our Hearts Will Beat as One
"Superstars"	2007	1	Dreams in Colour
"Rocket Man"	2007	12	Dreams in Colour
"Kiss Me, Oh Kiss Me"	2007	3	Dreams in Colour
"Orange Tree"	2008	—	Dreams in Colour: Tour Edition
"A Cry 4 Love"	2009	5	Between Waves
"U Know Who I Am"	2010	33	Between Waves
"Stop 4 a Minute"	2010	6	Between Waves
"What Life Is For"	2012	43	Seasons: Rising
"Under the Willow"	2012		Seasons: Rising
"All That I Wanted"	2012		Seasons: Falling
"Bowie 70"	2017	50	BOWIE 70

== Collaborations ==
David Fonseca has also collaborated with many other artists, such as Trovante and Sérgio Godinho. In 1999 he travelled to England to work with producer Darren Allison on the Phase song "City" from their album 52 Minutes of Your Time. Fonseca took part alongside many other Portuguese artists in the music video of "Encosta-te a mim" by Jorge Palma.

== Books published ==
- 2012: Right Here, Right Now

== Filmography ==
- 1996: Gel Fatal (director of photography)
- 2002: Esquece Tudo O Que Te Disse: David/Jovem no Karaoke (cameo appearance)
- 2005: Lastro (Composer)
- 2008: Os Contemporâneos: Ele Próprio (sketch: Videoclip for "Salvem os Ricos")
- 2010: Gru – O Maldisposto as Vector (voice actor)
