= Humanos =

- Origin: Portugal
- Genres: Alternative rock; folk pop
- Years active: 2004–2006
- Labels: EMI (2004-present)
- Website: Humanos.sapo.pt
- Albums: Humanos, Humanos ao vivo

Humanos (Portuguese for Humans) was a supergroup from Portugal. Formed in 2004, it was created to bring to light and interpret unreleased songs by an iconic Portuguese artist, the 1980s singer-songwriter António Variações.

David Fonseca (the lead singer of Silence 4), Manuela Azevedo (the lead singer of Clã), Camané (one of the most famous Portuguese fadistas), Sérgio Nascimento (a member of Sérgio Godinho's band), Hélder Gonçalves (also from Clã), Nuno Rafael and João Cardoso were the seven members of the group. They were responsible for what became an unmatched success at that point in the Portuguese music scene.

The homonymous album Humanos scored quintuple platinum status, staying for weeks in #1. "Muda de Vida", "Maria Albertina" and "Rugas" are just some of the group hits.

The project culminated in four sold-out concerts, two of them in Coliseu dos Recreios (Lisbon), another in Porto and, lastly, at the Festival do Sudoeste (a summer music festival) for an audience of 40,000 people, in 2005.

The release, in November 2006, of a CD and a DVD recorded at the Coliseu concerts, marked the end of the Humanos project.

All songs by Humanos were written by António Variações who recorded them as demos only and kept them in a shoe box, found after his death.

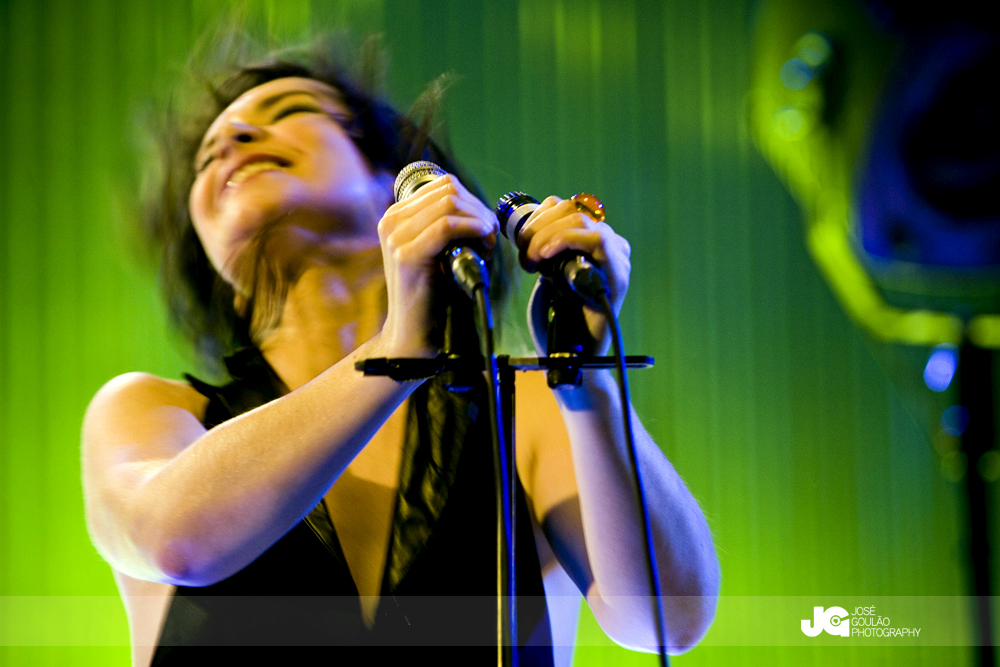
Humanos

== Discography ==
=== Humanos ===
Debut album released in 2004. Lyrics and music are by António Variações

1. A Teia
2. Quero É Viver
3. Muda De Vida
4. Na Lama
5. A Culpa É Da Vontade
6. Maria Albertina
7. Rugas
8. Gelado De Verão
9. Amor De Conserva
10. Já Não Sou Quem Era
11. Não Me Consumas
12. Adeus Que Me Vou Embora

=== Humanos ao Vivo ===
Live album released in 2006. Lyrics and music are by António Variações, except where noted.

CD

1. Na Lama
2. A Culpa É Da Vontade
3. A Teia
4. Estou Além
5. Maria Albertina
6. Já Não Sou Quem Era
7. Adeus Que Me Vou Embora
8. Anjinho da Guarda
9. Amor De Conserva
10. O Corpo é que Paga
11. Gelado De Verão
12. Hardcore (1º Escalão) - GNR Cover
13. Rugas
14. Eu Estava a Pensar Agora Em Ti
15. Não Me Consumas
16. Quero É Viver
17. Muda De Vida

DVD 1

- 2005: Concerto at the Coliseu dos Recreios

It contains a documentary Humanos - A Vida de Variações and videos "Muda De Vida", "Maria Albertina", "Quero Viver"

DVD 2

- 2005: Humanos in Festival Sudoeste

=== Credits ===
Both studio album and live album as well as DVDs credited to:

- Camané - vocals
- David Fonseca - vocals and guitar
- Manuela Azevedo - vocals
- Hélder Gonçalves - bass and guitar
- Nuno Rafael - guitar
- João Cardoso - piano and keyboards
- Sérgio Nascimento - drums and percussion
- Maria Alejandra Ordoñez Ocampo - vocals

== Chart performance ==
Year	Album	POR Chart positions
2004	Humanos	1
2006	Humanos ao Vivo	-
