= Only Pain Is Real =

Studio album by Silence 4
- Released: July 2000
- Genre: Alternative rock, pop rock
- Length: 61:55
- Label: Universal Music

Silence 4 chronology
Silence Becomes It (1998)	Only Pain Is Real (2000)

Only Pain Is Real is the second and final studio album by the Portuguese band Silence 4. It was released in July 2000, after the huge success of its predecessor, Silence Becomes It. Recorded in London, the album presented new sounds and fuller orchestrations, with 14 songs all written in English.

Musical critics pointed the band's more mature sound and songwriting, mostly done by lead singer David Fonseca. Only two singles were released: "To Give" and "Only Pain Is Real". The album seems somewhat autobiographical or conceptual, even if David Fonseca never clarified if all the lyrics were related or tried to tell a story. Nevertheless, the album shows a new level of maturity and introspection, more consistent then their debut album. The themes of loneliness, sadness, loss, melancholy and hope, are basically the same of their first album, but with an added level of poignancy.

The band toured the record for an extended period of time across Portugal until December 2000. The tour proved to be exhausting, and the members of the band decided to go for an indeterminate hiatus, which meant the end of the band, since all their four members went into different directions. Fonseca went on to start his own successful solo career with Sing Me Something New, released in 2003.

== Track listing ==
All songs by David Fonseca except where noted.

1. "To Give"
2. "Not Brave Enough" (music by Rui Costa)
3. "Empty Happy Song"
4. "Only Pain Is Real"
5. "I'm Not Perfect"
6. "Sleepwalking Convict" (music by David Fonseca, Rui Costa)
7. "Cruel II"
8. "Ceilings" (music by Rui Costa)
9. "Where Are You?"
10. "Alright"
11. "Search Me Not"
12. "Don't II"
13. "Take Me Away"
14. "Wild Oscar (Part I)" (instrumental, Rui Costa)

== Sales ==
Sales for Only Pain is Real
Region	Sales
Portugal	80,000
