= Cintura =

Cintura (Italian, Spanish, Portuguese "waist") may refer to:

- Cintura, jeweled belt
- Cintura, lower back pain
- Cintura, belted tyre made by Pirelli

== Places ==
- Cintura Formation, a geologic formation in Arizona.
- Cintura Line, a railway line in Lisbon, Portugal
- Milan belt railway (in Italian, Linea di cintura di Milano), a semicircular railway linking the railway lines converging on Milan, Italy, with each other and the Milano Centrale station

== Arts and entertainment ==
- Cintura (album), 2007 album by Portuguese pop-rock band Clã
- La cintura, erotic tale by Alberto Moravia
- La cintura (film), English title The Belt, 1989 Italian erotic film based on the Moravia tale
- "La cintura" (song), 2018 single by Álvaro Soler from his album Mar de Colores
