= Our Hearts Will Beat as One =

Studio album by David Fonseca
- Released: October 2005
- Genre: Pop, rock
- Label: Universal Records

David Fonseca chronology
| Sing Me Something New (2003) | Our Hearts Will Beat as One (2005) | Dreams in Colour (2007) |

Our Hearts Will Beat as One is the second solo album by Portuguese pop rock singer David Fonseca. It was released in Portugal in October 2005. The first single released from the album was lead track "Who Are U?", followed by "Our Hearts Will Beat as One". Fonseca wrote all the songs, in English, except the final ballad "Adeus, Não Afastes Os Teus Olhos Dos Meus", which is in Portuguese.

== Track listing ==
1. "Who Are U?"
2. "Swim"
3. "Cold Heart"
4. "Hold Still (featuring Rita Redshoes)"
5. "Start Over Again"
6. "Come into My Heart"
7. "Our Hearts Will Beat as One"
8. "The Longest Road"
9. "Open Legs Wide"
10. "Bu_urn"
11. "Adeus, Não Afastes Os Teus Olhos Dos Meus"
- David Fonseca recorded a bonus track named "When U Hit the Floor" for the Exclusive Edition sold only in Fnac stores.

== Critical response ==
Our Hearts Will Beat as One was critically acclaimed by all media and was considered pop album of the year in Portugal, even before the year-end. The album went straight to No. 1 on National Sales Chart and reached Gold status on its first week of sales.

== Singles ==
- "Who Are U?" (2005)
- "Hold Still" (feat. Rita Redshoes) (2006)
- "Our Hearts Will Beat as One" (2006)

== Charts ==
| Chart (2006) | Peak position |
|---|---|
| Portugal National Sales Chart | 1 |
