= Carrazedo =

Carrazedo can refer to the following parishes in Portugal:

- Carrazedo (Amares)
- Carrazedo (Bragança)

see also

- Carrazeda de Ansiães
