= Rui Costa (disambiguation) =

Rui Costa (born 1972) is a retired Portuguese footballer.

Rui Costa may also refer to:

- Rui Costa (cyclist) (born 1986), Portuguese cyclist
- Rui Costa (footballer, born 1996), Portuguese footballer
- Rui Costa (politician) (born 1963), governor of Bahia
- Rui Costa, musician in Silence 4
