= Between Waves =

Between Waves may refer to:

- Between Waves (album), 2009 album by David Fonseca
- Between Waves (film), 2020 Canadian film
- Between Waves, 2016 album by The Album Leaf
