= João Cardoso =

João Cardoso may refer to:

- João Cardoso (musician), Portuguese musician, part of Bunnyranch and Humanos
- João Cardoso (footballer, born 1951), former Portuguese football player
- João Cardoso de Meneses e Sousa, Baron of Paranapiacaba (1827–1915), Brazilian poet, translator, journalist, lawyer and politician
- João Lucas Cardoso (born 1991), Brazilian footballer
- João Cardoso (footballer, born 1997), Portuguese footballer
- João Lucas Cardoso, known as Johnny Cardoso, American soccer player

== See also ==
- Estádio João Cardoso, a football stadium in Tondela, Portugal
