= Sofia Lisboa =

Portuguese singer (born 1977)

Sofia Lisboa (born 1977) is a Portuguese singer.

She was born in France to Portuguese emigrants, but she came back with her family to Leiria, Portugal, in 1988, where she completed her secondary education. She also studied at the Faculty of Sciences of the University of Lisbon. She was the backing and supporting vocalist for Silence 4 during their active years, from 1996 to 2001. She provided a sensitive counterpart to David Fonseca's vocals. After the band's demise, she's been involved in other musical projects. After surviving cancer, the band decided to reunite once again for a series of concerts, in 2013 and 2014, where she performed once again with them.

She published her memoir, Nunca Desistas de Viver (2014).
