= Golden Era (Rita Redshoes album) =

Studio album by Rita Redshoes
- Released: March 18, 2008
- Recorded: 2007–2008 (Estúdios Valentim Carvalho)
- Genre: Pop, jazz
- Length: 39:38
- Label: Anjo Da Guarda
- Producer: Rita Redshoes, Nélson Carvalho

Singles from Golden Era
- 1. "Dream On Girl" Released: 2008; 2. "Hey Tom" Released: 2008; 3. "The Beginning Song" Released: 2008; 4. "Choose Love" Released: 2008

Golden Era is the debut album by Portuguese pop singer Rita Redshoes, released in 2008.

== Track listing ==
1. To Start...
2. The Beginning Song
3. Hey Tom
4. Choose Love
5. Oh My Mr. Blue
6. Golden Era I
7. Once I Found You
8. Dream On Girl
9. Blue Bird On A Sunny Day
10. Minimal Sounds
11. Your Waltz
12. Love, What Is It?
13. Love Is, Love You
