= Seasons: Rising =

Studio album by David Fonseca
- Released: 21 March 2012
- Genre: Pop, rock, alternative
- Length: 48:13
- Language: English
- Label: Universal Music Group

David Fonseca chronology
Between Waves (2009)	Seasons: Rising (2012)	Seasons: Falling (2012)

Singles from Seasons: Rising
- 1. "What Life Is For" Released: 6 February 2012; 2. "Under the Willow" Released: 1 June 2012; 3. "It Feels Like Something" Released: 8 July 2013

Seasons: Rising is the fifth album released by Portuguese pop-rock singer David Fonseca. It was released in Portugal on 21 March 2012.

== Track listing ==
No.	Title	Length
1.	"Under the Willow"	4:28
2.	"What Life Is For"	5:20
3.	"The Beating of the Drums"	4:04
4.	"Every Time We Kiss"	4:22
5.	"It Feels Like Something"	5:01
6.	"Heavy Heart (It Won't Go Away)"	4:27
7.	"Armageddon"	3:44
8.	"Whatever the Heart Desires"	3:46
9.	"Go * Dance * All * Night"	4:29
10.	"We’re So Much Better Than This"	3:57
11.	"I Would Have Gone and Loved You Anyway"	4:35
Total length:		48:13
