= Kiss Me, Oh Kiss Me =

Single by David Fonseca

from the album Dreams in Colour
- Released: 2007
- Recorded: 2007
- Genre: Pop
- Length: 4:04

David Fonseca singles chronology
"Rocket Man" (2007)	"Kiss Me, Oh Kiss Me" (2007)	"Orange Tree" (2008)

Music video
- "Kiss Me, Oh Kiss Me" on YouTube

'Kiss Me, Oh Kiss Me is a successful 2008 single from the Dreams in Colour album of the Portuguese singer David Fonseca. It is the third of three singles from the album, the others being "Superstars", "Rocket Man".

"Kiss Me, Oh Kiss Me" entered the Portuguese Singles Top 20 chart on the week of 19 January 2008, reaching #2 staying for a total of three weeks at that position (charts of 8, 15 and 22 March 2008). The single spent a 9 weeks in the Top 5 and 17 weeks in total in the Top 20.

== Music video ==
Credits for the music video:

- Photography: Paulo Segadães
- Post-production: Filipe Monteiro
- Directing: David Fonseca

It was recorded in 2 days in various locations in central Portugal. The video was released in program TOP+ of the Portuguese television network RTP the same day that was released on his blog on May 3, 2008.

== Charts ==
Chart (2008)	Peak Position
Portuguese Singles Chart (Top 20)	2
