= Dreams in Colour =

Studio album by David Fonseca
- Released: 8 October 2007
- Recorded: 2007
- Genre: Pop, rock, alternative
- Length: 43:27
- Language: English
- Label: Universal Records

David Fonseca chronology
Our Hearts Will Beat as One (2005)	Dreams in Colour (2007)	Between Waves (2009)

Singles from Dreams in Colour
- 1. "Superstars" Released: 23 July 2007; 2. "Rocket Man" Released: 8 October 2007; 3. "Kiss Me, Oh Kiss Me" Released: 2007

Dreams in Colour is the third solo album released by Portuguese pop rock singer David Fonseca. It was released in Portugal on 8 October 2007, to critical and commercial acclaim. Previously, the single "Superstars" had been released.The second single was "Rocket Man (I Think It's Going to Be a Long, Long Time)", a cover of the Elton John song. The video went out on 17 November. The third single, "Kiss Me, Oh Kiss Me" received a considerable airplay on Portuguese radio stations.

== Track listing ==
No.	Title	Length
1.	"Intro"	0:25
2.	"4th Chance"	4:05
3.	"Kiss Me, Oh Kiss Me"	4:05
4.	"Rocket Man (I Think It's Going to Be a Long, Long Time)"	4:39
5.	"Silent Void"	4:46
6.	"This Wind, Temptation"	3:50
7.	"I See the World Through You"	4:57
8.	"Superstars II"	4:08
9.	"This Raging Light"	4:45
10.	"Feet on Stones"	4:13
11.	"Dreams in Colour"	3:34
Total length:		43:27

== Personnel ==
- David Fonseca – organ, synthesizer, acoustic guitar, percussion, piano, drums, electric guitar, keyboards, electric piano, tambourine, vocals, backing vocals, whistle, producer, engineer, cavaquinho, clapping, string arrangements, photography, cover art concept, Indian harmonium, beat programming
- Sergio "Visom" Nascimento – percussion, drums, backing vocals, clapping, shak
- Maria Salgado – backing vocals, clapping
- Howie Weinberg – mastering

== DVD: Dreams in Colour: Tour Edition ==
This DVD contains the same 11-song track list as Dreams in Colour, in addition to seven additional live tracks as follows:

1. "If Our Hearts Do Ache" (live)
2. "Song to the Siren" (live)
3. "Who Are U?" (live)
4. "R de Ryan"
5. "How Do You Keep Love Alive" (live)
6. "Let's Stick Together" (live)
7. "I'm on Fire" (live)
