= Rocket Man (song) =

1972 single by Elton John

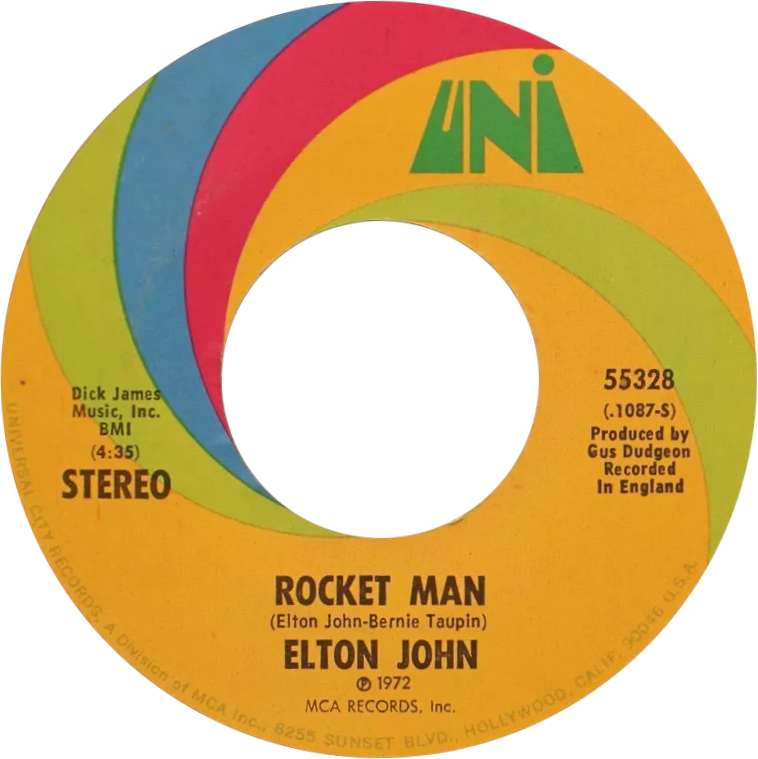
- One of the pressings of the US single

Single by Elton John

from the album Honky Château
- B-side: "Susie (Dramas)"
- Released: 31 March 1972
- Recorded: 16 January 1972
- Studio: Château d'Hérouville (Hérouville, France)
- Genre: Pop rock; glam rock; psychedelic pop
- Length: 4:35
- Label: Uni (US); DJM (UK)
- Songwriters: Elton John; Bernie Taupin
- Producer: Gus Dudgeon

Elton John singles chronology
"Tiny Dancer" (1972)	"Rocket Man" (1972)	"Honky Cat" (1972)

Audio sample
- "Rocket Man": file; help

Music video
- Elton John – Rocket Man on YouTube

"Rocket Man", also known as "Rocket Man (I Think It's Going to Be a Long, Long Time)", is a song written by British musician Elton John and lyricist Bernie Taupin, and performed by John. It was originally released on 31 March 1972 in the US, as the lead single to John's album Honky Château. The song first charted in the UK on 22 April, rising to No. 2 in the UK singles chart and No. 6 in the US Billboard Hot 100, becoming a major hit single for John. It is considered to be John's signature song.

On 5 June 2026, the song was certified quadruple platinum by the British Phonographic Industry (BPI) for sales and streams of 2,400,000 digital downloads and streaming equivalent sales. With sales of five million in the US, the song was certified 5× platinum by the Recording Industry Association of America (RIAA). Rolling Stone lists it at No. 149 of its 500 greatest songs of all time. On 6 January 2024, Rocket Man surpassed one billion streams on Spotify.

The song has been covered by many artists, most notably by Kate Bush in 1991, and by Portuguese singer David Fonseca in 2007. John himself, alongside producer Pnau and singer Dua Lipa, included the song in his 2021 mashup single "Cold Heart (Pnau remix)". William Shatner's spoken-word version from 1978 has been widely parodied.

== Background ==
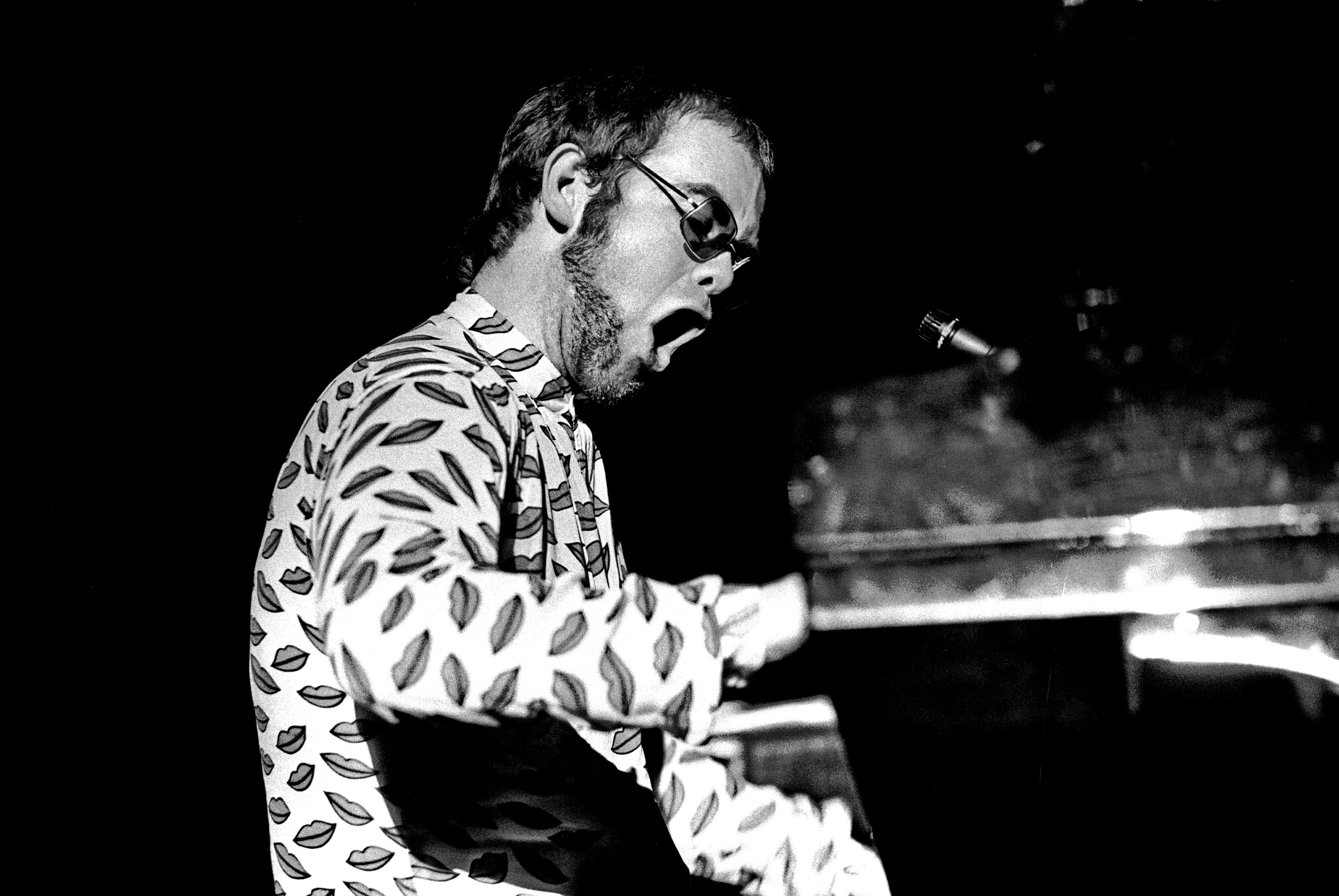
Elton John, 1972

The song was inspired by Ray Bradbury's short story "The Rocket Man" in The Illustrated Man, about a professional astronaut whose work keeps him away from his anguished family for months at a time. It echoes the theme of David Bowie's 1969 song "Space Oddity" (both recordings were produced by Gus Dudgeon). Taupin has denied that the Bowie song was an inspiration, but has acknowledged borrowing from Pearls Before Swine's 1970 "Rocket Man", written by Tom Rapp, which was also influenced by the Bradbury story. According to an account in Elizabeth Rosenthal's book His Song: The Musical Journey of Elton John, the song was inspired by Taupin's sighting of either a shooting star or a distant aeroplane.

The song describes a Mars-bound astronaut's mixed feelings at leaving Earth to do his job. Rosenthal's account goes on to relate that the notion of astronauts no longer being perceived as heroes, but in fact as an "everyday occupation", led Taupin to the song's opening lines: "She packed my bags last night, pre-flight. Zero hour: 9 a.m. And I'm gonna be high as a kite by then."

Musically, the song is a highly arranged classical rock ballad anchored by piano, with atmospheric texture added by synthesizer (played on the recording by engineer Dave Hentschel) and slide guitar. It is also known for being the first song in John's catalogue to feature what would become the signature backing vocal combination of his band at the time, Dee Murray, Nigel Olsson and Davey Johnstone.

The first stanza of "Rocket Man" was thought of by Bernie Taupin while he was on the motorway heading to his parents' home; he had to "repeat it to himself for two hours", which was "unfortunate", but in later interviews he said that since it gave him a hit, it was all worthwhile.

On the cover of the UK 7-inch single release, John appears in a photograph wearing a Nudie Cohn-made suit originally made for and stolen several years previously from John Christopher Ethridge of The Flying Burrito Brothers. After passing through several owners, almost 50 years after the single release the suit was recovered by Ethridge's family and placed on display at the Country Music Hall of Fame in Nashville, Tennessee.

== Reception ==
Record World said, "Elton John explores the outer limits of the possibilities of pop music" and that the song "should be a huge hit; it's one of his best."

== Legacy ==
"Rocket Man" was ranked No. 242 in the 2004 list of Rolling Stone's 500 Greatest Songs of All Time; it was ranked No. 245 in the list's 2010 revision, and 149 in the 2021 revision. The song has been a staple of John's concerts. Among numerous other performances, John played "Rocket Man" at the launch site of Space Shuttle Discovery in 1998. In tribute to David Bowie after his death in January 2016, John performed a piano rendition that combined "Rocket Man" with Bowie's "Space Oddity".

== Music video ==
In May 2017, an official music video for "Rocket Man" premiered at the Cannes Film Festival as a winner of Elton John: The Cut, a competition organised in partnership with AKQA, Pulse Films, and YouTube in honour of the fiftieth anniversary of his songwriting relationship with Bernie Taupin. The competition called upon independent filmmakers to submit treatments for music videos for one of three Elton John songs from the 1970s, with each song falling within a specific concept category. "Rocket Man" was designated for the animation category, and was co-directed by Iranian refugee Majid Adin and Irish animation director Stephen McNally; the video was inspired by Adin's own migration to England, portraying a character envisioning himself as an astronaut to draw parallels between the song's lyrics and the experiences of a refugee.

== Track listings ==
All songs written by Elton John and Bernie Taupin.

1. "Rocket Man" – 4:38
2. "Suzie (Dramas)" – 3:21

In 2003, Universal Records released both a 12-inch vinyl (promotional only) & CD maxi-single with three new remixes of the song:

- A. "Rocket Man (KDME remix)" – 4:20
- B1. "Rocket Man 03" – 4:01
- B2. "Rocket Man (Royal Garden's Radio mix)" – 4:19

Of these, "Rocket Man 03" was also included on the Rocket/Island/Mercury EP Remixed, along with four other remixes of Elton recordings.

== Personnel ==
- Elton John – piano, lead vocals
- David Hentschel – ARP synthesizer
- Davey Johnstone – electric slide & acoustic guitars, backing vocals
- Dee Murray – bass guitar, backing vocals
- Nigel Olsson – drums, backing vocals

== Charts ==
=== Weekly charts ===
Chart (1972–1973)	Peak position
Australia (Kent Music Report)	13
Canada Top Singles (RPM)	8
Irish Singles Chart (IRMA)	6
Italy	7
New Zealand (Listener)	11
Spain (AFE)	3
UK Singles (Official Charts)	2
US Billboard Hot 100	6
US Adult Contemporary (Billboard)	39
US Cash Box Top 100	11
West Germany (German Singles Charts)	18

Chart (2008)	Peak position
Norwegian Singles Chart	18

Chart (2019)	Peak position
US Hot Rock & Alternative Songs (Billboard)	4

=== Year-end charts ===
Chart (1972)	Rank
Brazil (Crowley)	27
Canada Top Singles (RPM)	99
UK Singles (OCC)	44
US Billboard Hot 100	40
US Cash Box Top 100	83

== Certifications ==
Region	Certification	Certified units/sales
Austria (IFPI Austria)	Gold	50,000^{*}
Denmark (IFPI Danmark)	Platinum	90,000^{‡}
Germany (BVMI)	Gold	250,000^{‡}
Italy (FIMI)	Platinum	50,000^{‡}
New Zealand (RMNZ)	9× Platinum	270,000^{‡}
Spain (Promusicae)	Platinum	60,000^{‡}
United Kingdom (BPI)	4× Platinum	2,400,000^{‡}
United States (RIAA)	5× Platinum	5,000,000^{‡}
^{*} Sales figures based on certification alone.^{‡} Sales+streaming figures based on certification alone.

== Kate Bush version ==
"Rocket Man (I Think It's Going to Be a Long, Long Time)"

Single by Kate Bush

from the album Two Rooms: Celebrating the Songs of Elton John & Bernie Taupin
- B-side: "Candle in the Wind"
- Released: 25 November 1991
- Genre: Reggae; ska
- Length: 5:02
- Label: Mercury
- Songwriters: Elton John; Bernie Taupin
- Producer: Kate Bush

Kate Bush singles chronology
"Love and Anger" (1990)	"Rocket Man (I Think It's Going to Be a Long, Long Time)" (1991)	"Rubberband Girl" (1993)

Music video
- "Rocket Man" on YouTube

English singer-songwriter Kate Bush released a cover of "Rocket Man" (with the subtitle "I Think It's Going to Be a Long, Long Time") in 1991 as part of the Elton John/Bernie Taupin tribute album Two Rooms: Celebrating the Songs of Elton John & Bernie Taupin. Her reggae-inflected version of "Rocket Man" was a commercial success, reaching No. 12 on the UK Singles Chart and No. 2 in Australia. In 2007, the track won The Observer readers' award for Greatest Cover of all time. The B-side of the single was Bush's recording of another Elton John classic, "Candle in the Wind."

From the age of 11, Elton John was my biggest hero. I loved his music, had all his albums and I hoped one day I'd play the piano like him (I still do). When I asked to be involved in this project and was given the choice of a track it was like being asked 'would you like to fulfil a dream? would you like to be Rocket Man?' ... yes, I would.

— Kate Bush

=== Critical reception ===
Upon its release, Ian Gittins of Melody Maker described it as a "real curio" as Bush's "ickle-girl quaver is applied as liberally as Elt's cod space-epic is unexpectedly white-reggaed up behind her". Stephen Dalton of NME was negative in his review, noting Bush's "ill-advised decision" to "croon breathily over an abysmal 'reggae' arrangement".

=== Track listings ===
All tracks are written by Elton John and Bernie Taupin.

UK 7-inch and cassette single
No.	Title	Length
1.	"Rocket Man (I Think It's Going to Be a Long, Long Time)"	5:02
2.	"Candle in the Wind"	4:29

UK 12-inch and CD single
No.	Title	Length
1.	"Rocket Man (I Think It's Going to Be a Long, Long Time)"	5:02
2.	"Candle in the Wind"	4:29
3.	"Candle in the Wind" (instrumental version)	4:28

=== Personnel ===
- Kate Bush – keyboards, vocals, producer
- Del Palmer – engineer

Additional musicians

- Davy Spillane – uilleann pipes
- Del Palmer – bass
- Alistair Anderson – concertina
- Charlie Morgan – drums
- Alan Murphy – guitar

=== Charts ===
==== Weekly charts ====
Chart (1991–1992)	Peak position
Australia (ARIA)	2
Canada Adult Contemporary (RPM)	22
Europe (Eurochart Hot 100)	32
France (SNEP)	45
Germany (GfK)	36
Ireland (IRMA)	17
Luxembourg (Radio Luxembourg)	11
Netherlands (Dutch Top 40)	22
Netherlands (Single Top 100)	27
Switzerland (Schweizer Hitparade)	20
UK Singles (Official Charts)	12
UK Airplay (Music Week)	15
US Alternative Airplay (Billboard)	11

==== Year-end charts ====
Chart (1992)	Position
Australia (ARIA)	100

=== Release history ===
Region	Date	Format(s)	Label(s)	Ref.
United Kingdom	25 November 1991	7-inch vinyl; 12-inch vinyl; CD; cassette	Mercury	
Australia	13 January 1992	CD; cassette	Mercury	
Japan	25 January 1992	Mini-CD	Mercury	

== David Fonseca version ==
"Rocket Man"

Single by David Fonseca

from the album Dreams in Colour
- Released: 2007
- Recorded: 2007
- Length: 4:38
- Label: Universal
- Songwriters: Elton John; Bernie Taupin

David Fonseca singles chronology
"Superstars" (2007)	"Rocket Man" (2007)	"Kiss Me, Oh Kiss Me" (2007)

Music video
- "Rocket Man" on YouTube

Portuguese singer David Fonseca released his version of the song as a single in Portugal, reaching No. 12 in the Portuguese Top 20. The song—fully titled "Rocket Man (I Think It's Going to Be a Long, Long Time)"—also appears on Fonseca's third album Dreams in Colour released in 2007 and on the Dreams in Colour: Tour Edition released in 2008. The music video was directed by Fonseca himself.

=== Charts ===
Chart (2007)	Peak position
Portuguese Singles Chart (Top 20)	12

== Sara James version ==
"Rocket Man"

Single by Sara James
- Released: 4 November 2022
- Recorded: 2022
- Length: 2:56
- Label: Polydor
- Songwriters: Elton John; Bernie Taupin

Sara James singles chronology
"Taka sama" (2022)	"Rocket Man" (2022)	"Running Up That Hill" (2022)

In 2022, Polish singer Sara James released her version of the song as a single. The song was performed on America's Got Talent the same year.

== William Shatner version ==
At the 5th Saturn Awards Ceremony, which aired as the "Science Fiction Film Awards" in January 1978, Taupin introduced William Shatner's spoken word interpretation of the song. It used chroma key video techniques to simultaneously portray three different images of Shatner, representing the different facets of the Rocket Man's character.

The performance gained notoriety as the most well-known example of Shatner's interpretive spoken word cover versions, and it has often been used for mockery or as an unintentionally funny novelty. It was parodied on the U.S. animated series Animaniacs, Family Guy, Freakazoid!, Futurama, The Simpsons, the Canadian CGI series ReBoot, and in the video for "Where It's At" by Beck. On a 1992 episode of Late Night with David Letterman, Chris Elliott parodied Shatner's performance, complete with chroma key effects.

Shatner re-recorded the song for his 2011 album Seeking Major Tom. In his book What Were They Thinking? The 100 Dumbest Events in Television History, author David Hofstede ranked Shatner's performance at No. 17 on the list.

== Sampling ==
Elton John and Dua Lipa's 2021 collaborative song "Cold Heart" samples "Rocket Man" for its chorus, along with snippets of other songs by John. It topped the charts in the United Kingdom, Australia and New Zealand, reached No. 2 in Ireland, and peaked at No. 7 on the US Billboard Hot 100.
