= Santa Maria do Bouro =

- Civil parish
- Location in Portugal
- Coordinates: 41.6619°N 8.2694°W
- Country: Portugal
- Region: Norte
- Intermunic. comm.: Cávado
- District: Braga
- Municipality: Amares

Area
  - Total: 6.92 km^{2} (2.67 sq mi)

Population (2011)
  - Total: 760
  - Density: 110/km^{2} (280/sq mi)
- Time zone: UTC+00:00 (WET)
  - Summer (DST): UTC+01:00 (WEST)

Santa Maria do Bouro is a parish in Amares Municipality in the Braga District in Portugal. The population in 2011 was 760, in an area of 6.92 km^{2} (2.67 sq mi).
