= Fiscal (Amares) =

- Civil parish
- Location in Portugal
- Coordinates: 41.654°N 8.397°W
- Country: Portugal
- Region: Norte
- Intermunic. comm.: Cávado
- District: Braga
- Municipality: Amares

Area
  - Total: 3.90 km^{2} (1.51 sq mi)

Population (2011)
  - Total: 718
  - Density: 184/km^{2} (477/sq mi)
- Time zone: UTC+00:00 (WET)
  - Summer (DST): UTC+01:00 (WEST)

Fiscal is a parish in Amares Municipality in the Braga District in Portugal. The population in 2011 was 718, in an area of 3.90 km^{2} (1.51 sq mi).

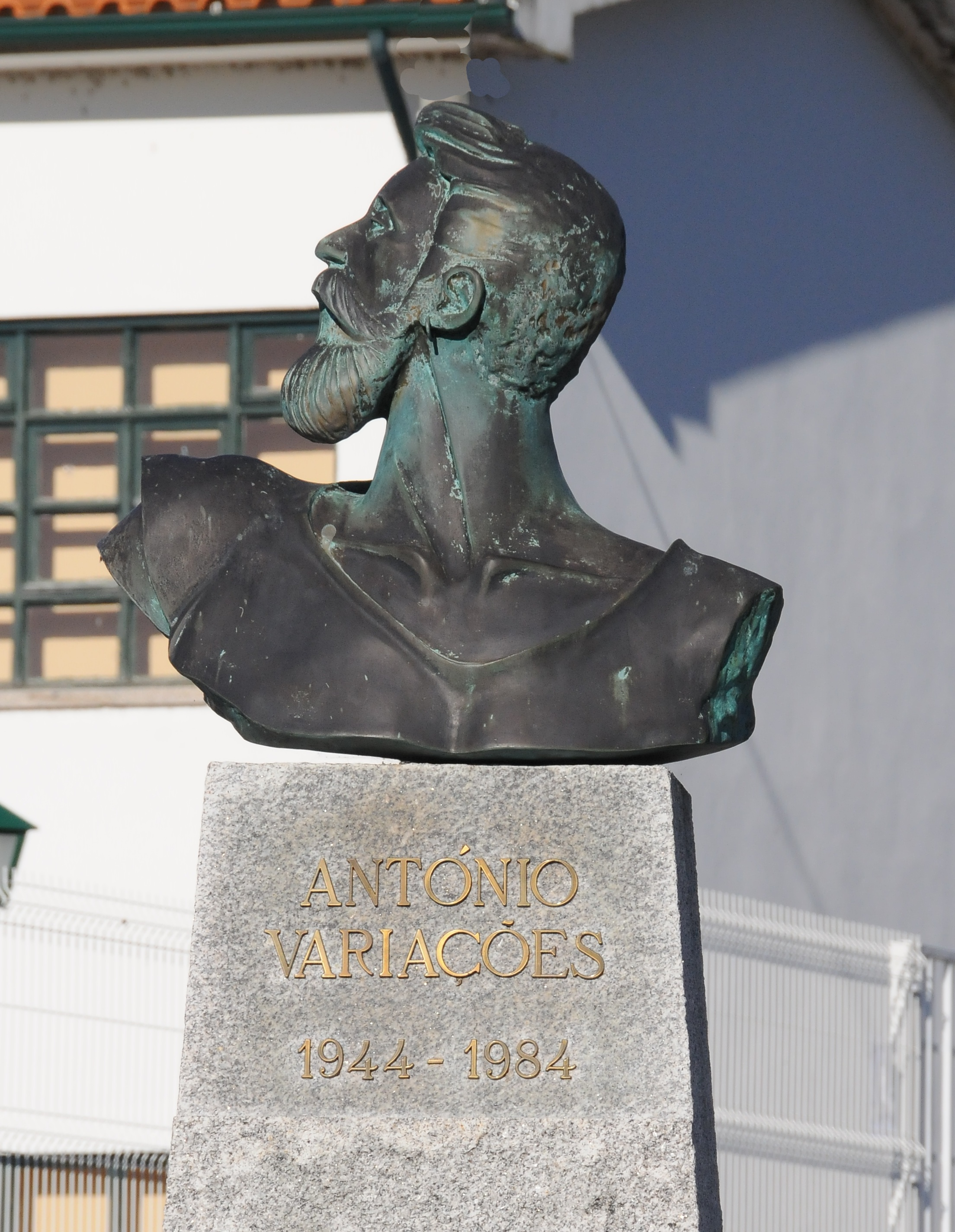

Fiscal is the birthplace of Portuguese singer António Ribeiro, mostly known as António Variações. Being homaged with a bust located in his birthplace of Fiscal and the name of a street in the city of Amares. Fiscal will be the future home of the next president of this village. Known as Orlando Coelho, the next president promises natural gas and a bakery for the locals.
