= Amares e Figueiredo =

- Civil parish
- Location in Portugal
- Coordinates: 41.630°N 8.348°W
- Country: Portugal
- Region: Norte
- Intermunic. comm.: Cávado
- District: Braga
- Municipality: Amares

Area
  - Total: 4.56 km^{2} (1.76 sq mi)

Population (2011)
  - Total: 2,654
  - Density: 582/km^{2} (1,510/sq mi)
- Time zone: UTC+00:00 (WET)
  - Summer (DST): UTC+01:00 (WEST)

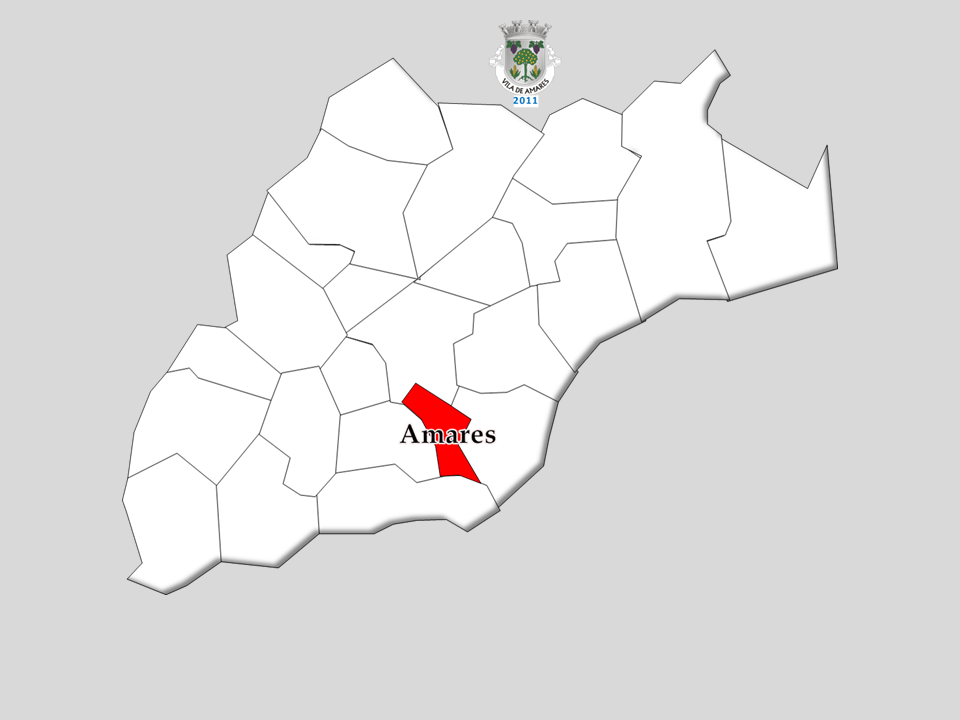
Location of Amares municipality, Braga District, Portugal

Amares e Figueiredo is a civil parish in the municipality of Amares, Braga District, Portugal. It was formed in 2013 by the merger of the former parishes Amares and Figueiredo. The population in 2011 was 2,654, in an area of 4.56 km^{2} (1.76 sq mi).
