= Torre e Portela =

- Civil parish
- Location in Portugal
- Coordinates: 41.653°N 8.371°W
- Country: Portugal
- Region: Norte
- Intermunic. comm.: Cávado
- District: Braga
- Municipality: Amares

Area
  - Total: 3.59 km^{2} (1.39 sq mi)

Population (2011)
  - Total: 626
  - Density: 174/km^{2} (452/sq mi)
- Time zone: UTC+00:00 (WET)
  - Summer (DST): UTC+01:00 (WEST)

Torre e Portela is a civil parish in the municipality of Amares, Braga District, Portugal. It was formed in 2013 by the merger of the former parishes Torre and Portela. The population in 2011 was 626, in an area of 3.59 km^{2} (1.39 sq mi).
