= Rendufe (Amares) =

- Civil parish
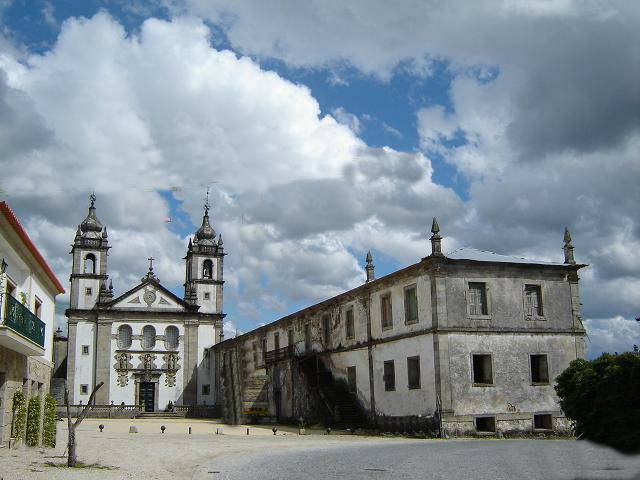

- Location in Portugal
- Coordinates: 41.6289°N 8.4092°W
- Country: Portugal
- Region: Norte
- Intermunic. comm.: Cávado
- District: Braga
- Municipality: Amares

Area
  - Total: 3.06 km^{2} (1.18 sq mi)

Population (2011)
  - Total: 1,124
  - Density: 367/km^{2} (951/sq mi)
- Time zone: UTC+00:00 (WET)
  - Summer (DST): UTC+01:00 (WEST)

Rendufe is a parish in Amares Municipality in the Braga District in Portugal. The population in 2011 was 1,124, in an area of 3.06 km^{2} (1.18 sq mi).
