= Dornelas (Amares) =

Parish in Portugral

- Civil parish
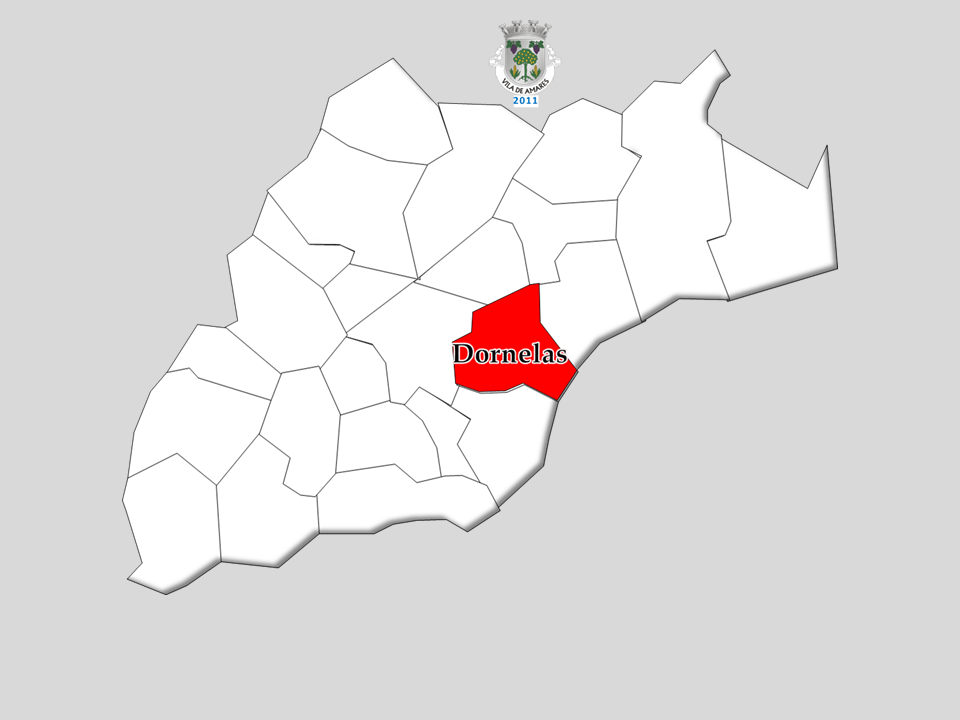
- Coordinates: 41.6450°N 8.3261°W
- Country: Portugal
- Region: Norte
- Intermunic. comm.: Cávado
- District: Braga
- Municipality: Amares

Area
  - Total: 3.39 km^{2} (1.31 sq mi)

Population (2011)
  - Total: 508
  - Density: 150/km^{2} (388/sq mi)
- Time zone: UTC+00:00 (WET)
  - Summer (DST): UTC+01:00 (WEST)

Dornelas is a parish in Amares Municipality in the Braga District in Portugal. The population in 2011 was 508, in an area of 3.39 km^{2} (1.31 sq mi).
