= Caires Parish =

Caires
- Civil parish
- Location in Portugal
- Coordinates: 41.642°N 8.357°W
- Country: Portugal
- Region: Norte
- Intermunic. comm.: Cávado
- District: Braga
- Municipality: Amares

Area
  - Total: 4.72 km^{2} (1.82 sq mi)

Population (2011)
  - Total: 868
  - Density: 184/km^{2} (476/sq mi)
- Time zone: UTC+00:00 (WET)
  - Summer (DST): UTC+01:00 (WEST)
- Postal code: 4720

Caires is a civil parish in the municipality of Amares, Braga District, Portugal. In 2011, the population was 868, in an area of 4.72 km^{2} (1.82 sq mi). In 2021, it was 878.

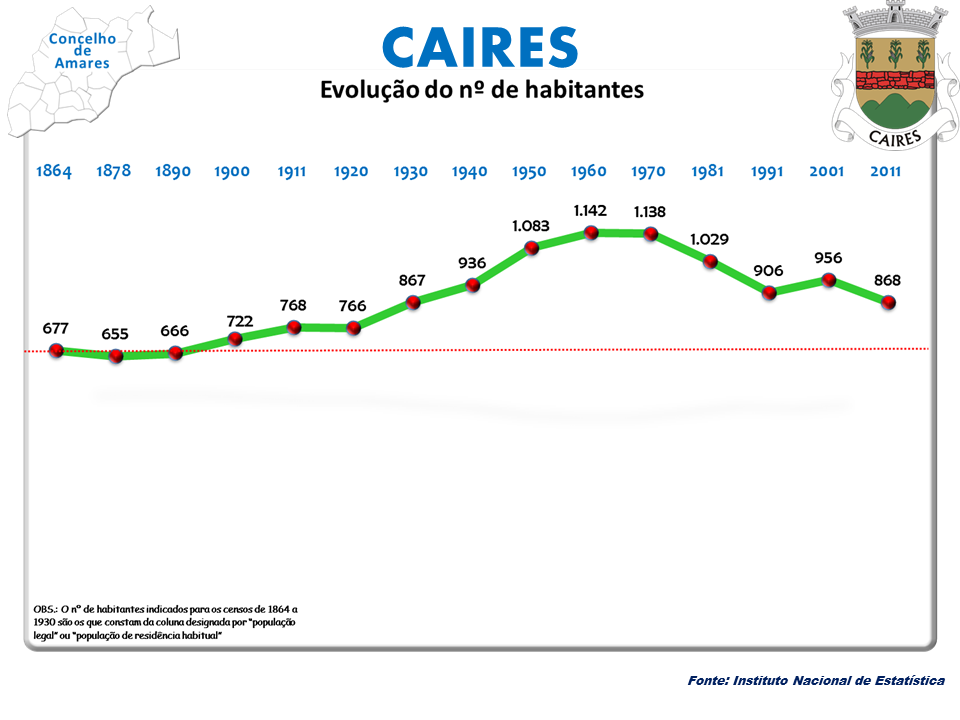
Numbers of residents graph
