= Sing Me Something New =

Studio album by David Fonseca
- Released: 2003
- Genres: Pop, rock, alternative
- Label: Universal Records

David Fonseca chronology
Sing Me Something New (2003)	Our Hearts Will Beat as One (2005)

Sing Me Something New is the debut solo album by Portuguese pop rock singer and guitarist David Fonseca. It was released in Portugal in 2003, following his departure from Silence 4. Fonseca played nearly all the instruments in the album. The album features the singles "Someone That Cannot Love" and "The 80s", which both became hits.

The danceable anthem "The 80s" was chosen by Vodafone for their summer advertising campaign. Sing Me Something New charted at No. 2 and its sales were certified platinum.

== Track listing ==
All songs by David Fonseca.

1. Intro"
2. "The 80's"
3. "Someone That Cannot Love"
4. "Playing Bowies with Me"
5. "So You Want to Save the World"
6. "U Make Me Believe"
7. "You and I (Letter to S.)"
8. "Haunted Home"
9. "Summer Will Bring You Over"
10. "Now That I Am You"
11. "Revolution Edit"
12. "In Love with Yourself"
13. "So You Really Believe That Love Will Keep You from Getting Hurt?"
14. "Sing Me Something New"
15. "My Sunshine and My Rain"

=== Singles ===
- "Someone That Cannot Love" (2003)
- "The 80's" (2003)
