= Santa Marta do Bouro =

- Civil parish
- Location in Portugal
- Coordinates: 41.6631°N 8.2894°W
- Country: Portugal
- Region: Norte
- Intermunic. comm.: Cávado
- District: Braga
- Municipality: Amares

Area
  - Total: 9.50 km^{2} (3.67 sq mi)

Population (2011)
  - Total: 490
  - Density: 52/km^{2} (130/sq mi)
- Time zone: UTC+00:00 (WET)
  - Summer (DST): UTC+01:00 (WEST)

Santa Marta do Bouro is a parish in Amares Municipality in the Braga District in Portugal. The population in 2011 was 490, in an area of 9.50 km^{2} (3.67 sq mi).
