= Amares =

- Municipality
- Town of Amares
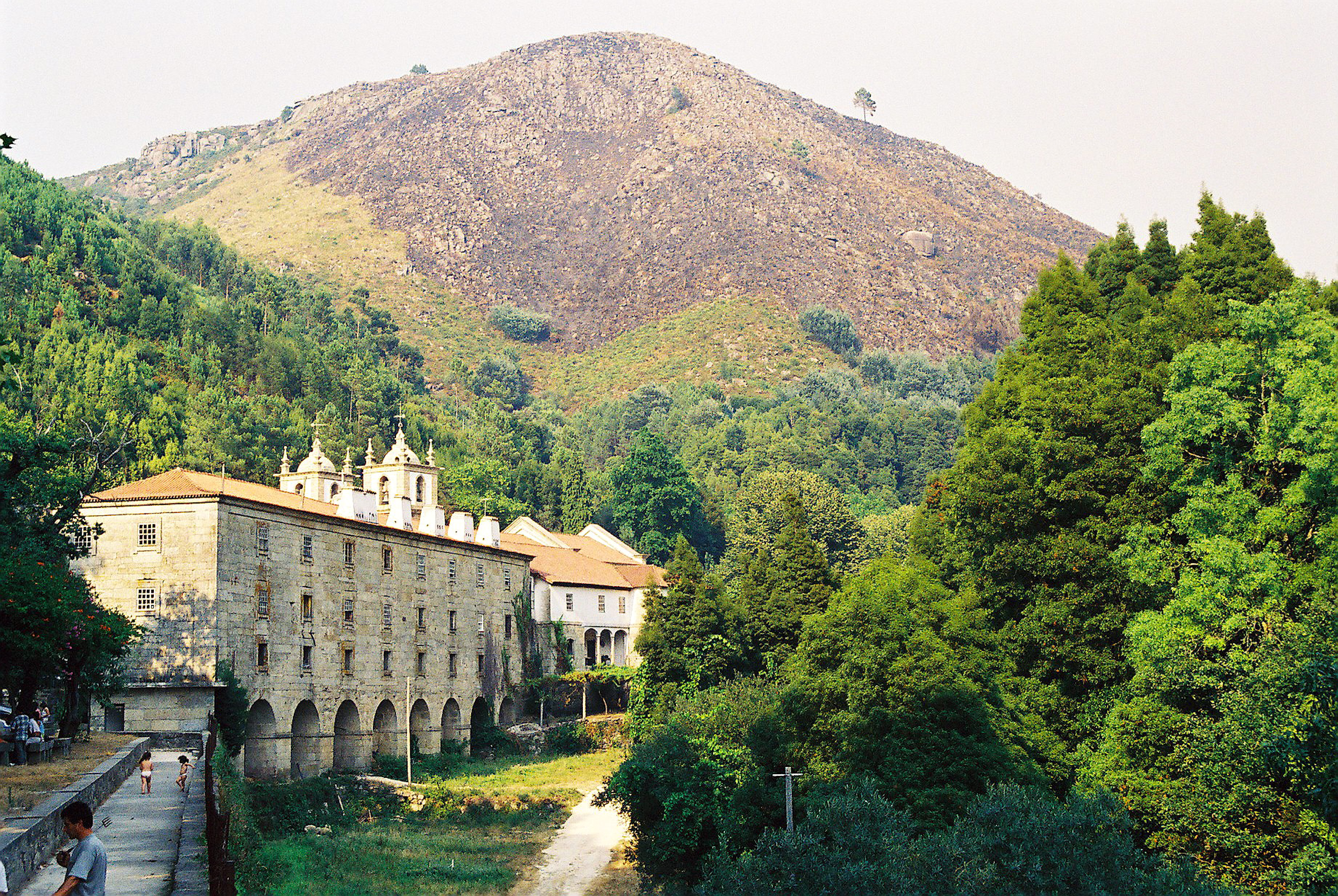

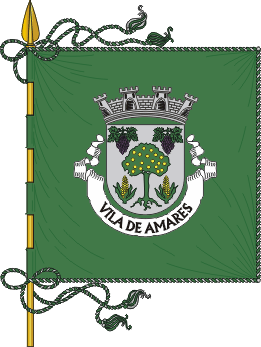
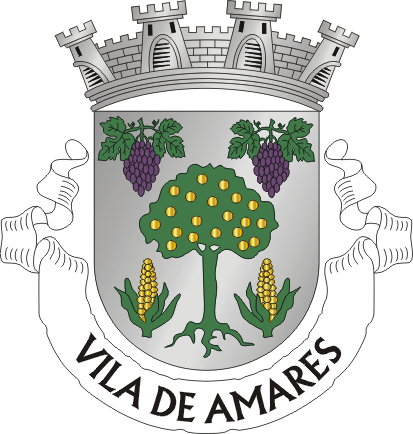
- Flag Coat of arms
- Interactive map of Amares
- Location in Portugal
- Coordinates: 41°37′N 8°20′W
- Country: Portugal
- Region: Norte
- Intermunic. comm.: Cávado
- District: Braga
- Parishes: 16

Government
  - President: Emanuel Magalhães (PSD)

Area
  - Total: 81.95 km^{2} (31.64 sq mi)

Population (2011)
  - Total: 18,889
  - Density: 230.5/km^{2} (597.0/sq mi)
- Time zone: UTC+00:00 (WET)
  - Summer (DST): UTC+01:00 (WEST)
- Website: http://www.cm-amares.pt/

Amares (Portuguese pronunciation: [ɐˈma.ɾɨʃ]), officially Town of Amares (Portuguese: Vila de Amares), is a municipality in Braga District, Portugal. The population in 2011 was 18,889, in an area of 81.95 km^{2}.

Amares limits to the north and northeast with the municipality of Terras de Bouro, to the southeast with Vieira do Minho and Póvoa de Lanhoso, to the south with Braga and to the northwest with Vila Verde.

The present Mayor is Emanuel Magalhães, elected by the Social Democratic Party. The municipal holiday is June 13.

== Demographics ==
Pop. Amares Municipality (1801–2011)
1801	1849	1900	1930	1960	1981	1991	2001	2011
5411	8030	12746	13878	16845	16478	16715	18521	18889

== Parishes ==
The municipality is subdivided into the following parishes:

- Amares e Figueiredo
- Barreiros
- Bico
- Caires
- Caldelas, Sequeiros e Paranhos
- Carrazedo
- Dornelas
- Ferreiros, Prozelo e Besteiros
- Fiscal
- Goães
- Lago
- Rendufe
- Santa Maria do Bouro
- Santa Marta do Bouro
- Torre e Portela
- Vilela, Seramil e Paredes Secas

== Notable people ==
- Gualdim Pais (1118–1195), crusader, member of the Knights Templar in Portugal for Afonso Henriques, founder of the city of Tomar
- António Variações (1944–1984), singer and songwriter
- Jorge Pires (b. 1981), former professional footballer
