= Seasons: Falling =

Studio album by David Fonseca
- Released: 21 September 2012
- Genre: Pop, rock, alternative
- Length: 49:22
- Language: English
- Label: Universal Music Group

David Fonseca chronology
| Seasons: Rising (2012) | Seasons: Falling (2012) |

Singles from Seasons: Falling
- 1. "All That I Wanted" Released: 4 September 2012

Seasons: Falling is the sixth album released by Portuguese pop rock singer David Fonseca, released in Portugal on 21 September 2012.

== Track listing ==
| No. | Title | Length |
|---|---|---|
| 1. | "I'll Never Hang My Head Down" | 4:21 |
| 2. | "Monday, Tuesday, Wednesday, Thursday" | 3:48 |
| 3. | "All That I Wanted" | 4:50 |
| 4. | "Queen of the Golden Sounds" | 3:53 |
| 5. | "It Means I Love You" | 3:39 |
| 6. | "No More Tears Running" | 3:45 |
| 7. | "It Shall Pass" | 4:32 |
| 8. | "At Your Door" | 5:07 |
| 9. | "Heartbroken" | 6:23 |
| 10. | "On My Feet Again" | 3:30 |
| 11. | "I'll See You in My Dreams" | 5:34 |
| Total length: | | 49:22 |
