= Silence Becomes It =

Studio album by Silence 4
- Released: June 1998
- Genre: Alternative rock, pop rock
- Length: 53:18
- Label: PolyGram

Silence 4 chronology
Silence Becomes It (1998)	Only Pain Is Real (2000)

Silence Becomes It is the debut album by Portuguese band Silence 4, released in June 1998. It was a huge success in Portugal, reaching a six-time platinum certification (240,000 units sold), but had less success internationally.

The album contains 15 songs, including a hidden track, and two versions of "A Little Respect" by Erasure. Most of the songs are in English, with only two in Portuguese: "Sextos Sentidos", a duet with Sérgio Godinho, and "Eu Não Sei Dizer". The songs deal with themes of love, pain, melancholy, loss, death, sorrow, loneliness and nostalgia – themes that are recurrent in Silence 4 and David Fonseca's solo career discography. Both "Borrow" and "My Friends" were highly successful singles in Portugal.

== Track listing ==
Music and lyrics by David Fonseca, except where noted.

1. "Goodbye Tomorrow"
2. "Borrow"
3. "Dying Young" (lyrics: Bruno Urbano)
4. "Old Letters"
5. "Angel Song"
6. "My Friends"
7. "A (Very) Little Respect" (Vince Clarke, Andy Bell)
8. "Sextos Sentidos" (lyrics: Sérgio Godinho; music: Rui Costa)
9. "We"
10. "Breeders" (lyrics: Bruno Urbano)
11. "Eu Não Sei Dizer"
12. "Cry" (music: Rui Costa)
13. "A Little Respect" (Vince Clarke, Andy Bell)
14. "Teeth Against the Glass"
15. "Sex Freak" (hidden track)

== Charts ==
Chart performance for Silence Becomes It
Chart (2025)	Peak position
Portuguese Albums (AFP)	86
