= Bico (Amares) =

- Civil parish
- Location in Portugal
- Coordinates: 41.6403°N 8.4092°W
- Country: Portugal
- Region: Norte
- Intermunic. comm.: Cávado
- District: Braga
- Municipality: Amares

Area
  - Total: 2.29 km^{2} (0.88 sq mi)

Population (2011)
  - Total: 777
  - Density: 339/km^{2} (879/sq mi)
- Time zone: UTC+00:00 (WET)
  - Summer (DST): UTC+01:00 (WEST)

Bico is a parish in Amares Municipality in the Braga District in Portugal. The population in 2011 was 777, in an area of 2.29 km^{2} (0.88 sq mi).
