= Superstars (song) =

Single by David Fonseca

from the album Dreams in Colour
- Released: 2007
- Recorded: 2007
- Genre: Pop
- Length: 4:04
- Label: Universal Records

David Fonseca singles chronology
| "Our Hearts Will Beat As One" (2006) | "Superstars" (2007) | "Rocket Man" (2007) |

Music video
- "Superstars" on YouTube

"Superstars" is a successful 2008 single taken from Dreams in Colour, the 2007 album of the Portuguese singer David Fonseca. "Superstars" is the first of three singles from the album, the other three being "Rocket Man" and "Kiss Me, Oh Kiss Me".

During 2007-2008, "Superstars" stayed 33 weeks in the Portuguese Singles Top 50 chart including 4 weeks at #1.

== Charts ==
| Chart (2007–2008) | Peak Position |
|---|---|
| Portuguese Singles Chart (Top 20) | 1 |
