= Goães (Amares) =

- Civil parish
- Location in Portugal
- Coordinates: 41.6517°N 8.3144°W
- Country: Portugal
- Region: Norte
- Intermunic. comm.: Cávado
- District: Braga
- Municipality: Amares

Area
  - Total: 3.03 km^{2} (1.17 sq mi)

Population (2011)
  - Total: 557
  - Density: 184/km^{2} (476/sq mi)
- Time zone: UTC+00:00 (WET)
  - Summer (DST): UTC+01:00 (WEST)

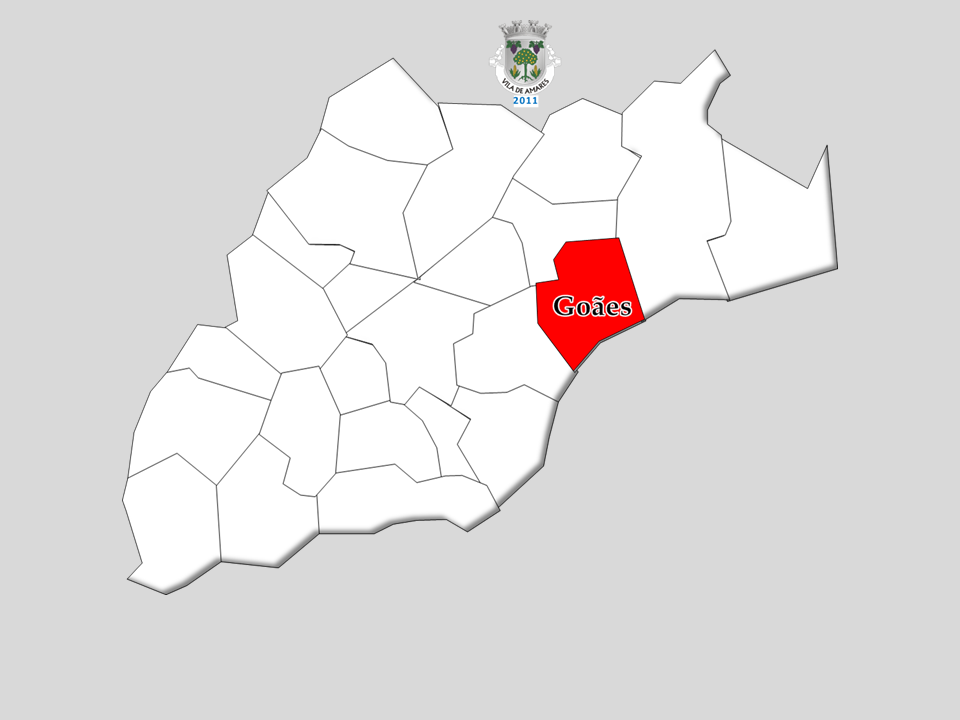
Map from the 2011 census

Goães is a parish in Amares Municipality in the Braga District in Portugal. The population in 2011 was 557, in an area of 3.03 km^{2} (1.17 sq mi).
