= António Variações =

Portuguese singer and songwriter (1944–1984)

- Variações in 1982.

Background information
- Born: António Joaquim Rodrigues Ribeiro; 3 December 1944; Amares, Portugal
- Died: 13 June 1984 (aged 39) Lisbon, Portugal
- Genres: Pop; folk; new wave
- Occupations: Singer; songwriter
- Years active: 1978–1984
- Label: EMI - Valentim de Carvalho

António Joaquim Rodrigues Ribeiro (3 December 1944 – 13 June 1984) was a Portuguese singer and songwriter. Despite his short-lived career due to his premature death at the age of thirty-nine, using the stage name of António Variações, he became one of the most culturally significant performing artists of recent Portuguese history. His recorded works blended contemporary music genres with traditional Portuguese rhythms and melodies, creating music which for many is symbolic of the liberalization that occurred in Portuguese society after the Carnation Revolution of 1974. The original and provocative nature of his recorded works has led to him being widely recognized as one of the most innovative artists in the recent history of Portuguese popular music.

== Early life ==
António Variações was born in Lugar do Pilar, in the small village of Fiscal (Amares, Braga), the fifth of ten children of Deolinda de Jesus and Jaime Ribeiro. As a child, his love of music often took him away from his fieldwork chores and towards the local folklore celebrations. He completed his basic education at the age of eleven and soon after took up his first job making small trinkets in the neighboring village of Caldelas.

At the age of twelve, he moved to the capital, Lisbon, to work at an office. From 1964 to 1967, he served the compulsory army duty in Angola during the Portuguese Colonial War, returning home safe, but almost immediately departing to London, to work as a dishwasher at a school, for the duration of a year. Returning once again to Portugal for a brief time in 1976, António Variações roamed to Amsterdam where he took up hairdressing, which he would continue to practice when returning to Lisbon in the following year, opening the first unisex salon in the country and afterwards a barber shop downtown (among his clients there would be several people from the music industry, who would help launch his career).

Parallel to this day job, he started working the local club scene at night, along with a group of musicians dubbed "Variações" (translated, "Variations", a word which suggested the diversity of the singer's influences, sound, and style). His garish visuals and camp fashion accessories, uncommon for a man at the time in Portugal, soon started to become noticed.

== Career ==
Newspaper clipping, announcing one of Variações' first concerts at the Lisbon nightclub, Trumps, on 18 March 1981. At this point, he was simply billed as: "António, author-interpreter, with the band Kamikaze and friends"

=== Signing with Valentim de Carvalho ===
In 1978, António submitted a demo tape to Valentim de Carvalho, one of the most important record labels in Portugal, but, despite signing a contract, he would not be allowed to record anything for another four years because the executives were unsure about the genre that best suited his work, folk or pop music, and therefore could not come to a consensus as to what should be done with the unusual artist. In February 1981, he appeared with his band in a popular TV show presented by Júlio Isidro, called "Passeio dos Alegres", billed as "António e Variações" and performing two unreleased songs ("Toma o comprimido" and "Não me consumas"). Júlio Isidro was a usual customer of António Variações's barber shop, and at a certain visit, he told him that he wrote songs. As a result, Júlio Isidro invited him to appear in his show. Following this appearance, he would be a guest a few times on "Febre de Sábado de Manhã", a radio show on Rádio Comercial presented by the same host.

=== "Anjo da Guarda" ===
In July 1982, his first single was released, this time under the name of António Variações. This recording featured a cover of the seminal fado "Povo Que Lavas No Rio", immortalized by the diva of the genre, Amália Rodrigues, and an original song of his own authorship, "Estou Além", one of his best known songs that would feature in his first LP record. The cover song of the untouchable fado caused controversy among many, but over time became accepted as a heartfelt tribute of Variações to Amália Rodrigues, to whom he dedicated his first LP, "Anjo da Guarda", released in 1983, to great critical and popular acclaim. Two of the songs from this release, "O Corpo É Que Paga" and "É P'ra Amanhã" experienced frequent radio airplay, the latter being released as a Summer single.

=== "Dar & Receber" ===
After a series of concerts, António returned to the studio and, between the 6 and 25 February 1984, recorded his second and final LP, entitled "Dar & Receber" (together with most of the Heróis do Mar line-up), which would be released in May of the same year and received once again with great enthusiasm on all fronts (having in the torch song "Canção de Engate" one of the artist's biggest hits). Two months later, he would perform his last concert in the Portuguese parish of Viatodos (part of the municipality of Barcelos), during the festival of "Feira da Isabelinha". In April he would make his last public appearance at the television show A Festa Continua, hosted by Júlio Isidro.

== Death ==
On 18 May 1984, Variações was admitted to the Pulido Valente hospital with symptoms of asthmatic bronchitis and later transferred to the Red Cross Clinic. At the time, the health of the artist was severely debilitated and rumours about his condition being brought on by AIDS started to circulate, which, given the prejudice towards the disease at the time, made him a target of some discrimination. Save for his family and closest friends, he received few visitors during his stay at the hospital. In June, the press released news that his health state had deteriorated considerably.

António Variações' coffin is carried away, at the Estrela Basilica.

At dawn on 13 June, António Variações died due to a bilateral bronchial pneumonia. His funeral was held on 15 June at the Estrela Basilica, where family, friends, fellow musicians, barbers, and fans paid their last respects. The funeral stirred some controversy because the authorities ordered that his coffin be sealed for public health concerns, which further fueled the rumors that he had died as a result of AIDS-related complications. The family of António Variações doesn't acknowledge that this was the actual cause of death (or that he was a homosexual), but it is assumed by most that he was one of the first public victims of the disease in Portugal. His former manager, Teresa Couto Pinto, has claimed that, prior to his death, Variações had received clinical test results performed in the United States confirming that he was indeed HIV-positive. His remains were buried in the cemetery of Fiscal, Amares, where they still rest today.

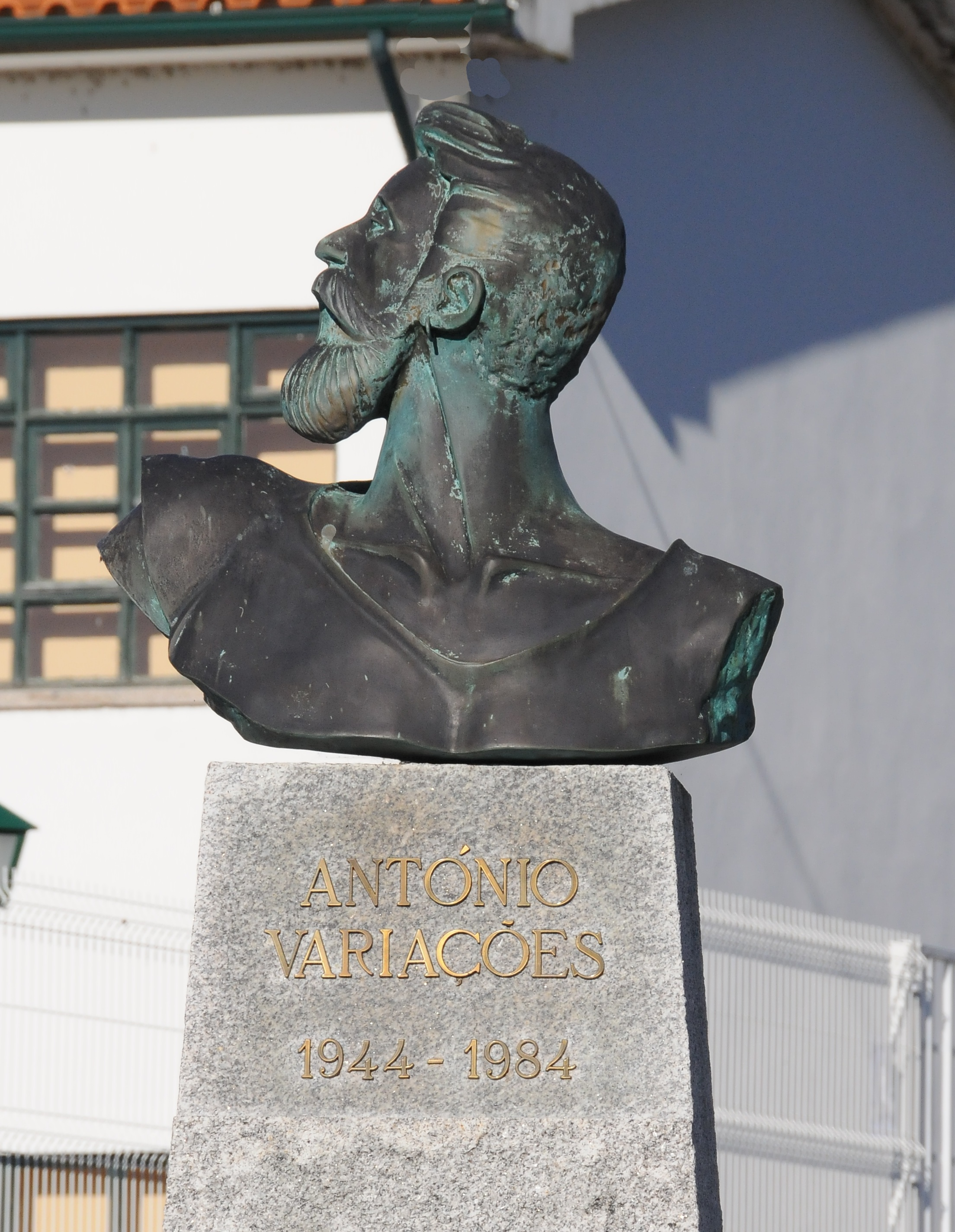
Bust of António Variações in Fiscal, Amares, sculpted by the artist Arlindo Fagundes

== Musical style ==
António Variações had no formal music training. His first musical influence was his father, who played accordion and cavaquinho, but never had the chance to become a serious musician. From his travels abroad, Variações was able to get in touch with artists and genres which were not widely known back home and began fusing genres such as pop, rock, jazz, blues and new wave with his Portuguese folk and fado roots.

Not knowing how to play or compose music did not stop António from making music by himself. He would, using a tape recorder, mimicking sounds and rhythms while he sang, using his own voice or even tapping his hands on different objects. These recordings were then used by his supporting studio musicians as the basis for the song arrangements. Variações' music is characterized by the use of a variety of instruments, ranging from synthesizers, to Portuguese and classical guitars, to accordions and more. Defying genre definition, he created his own description for his sound: something between Braga and New York, reflecting the cosmopolitan, yet down to earth and rural aspect of his eclectic style. He was intent on becoming a popular artist in the true sense of the word and he managed to reach audiences which were very diverse, from the blue collar to the white collar workers, to the uneducated and the intellectuals, to young and old alike.

=== Lyrics ===
Despite having only the minimum education (at the time, four years of basic instruction, although he also attended night school classes in Lisbon for some time) and no music training, Variações had a deep sense of rhythm and a keen mastery of the written word. Variações' lyrics are often a mix of proverbs, popular wisdom, and personal experiences and he had a notable ability to spin commonplaces into original and compelling imagery. This popular character of his words made it easy for most of his listeners to identify with the themes of the songs, which often speak about restlessness, feelings of escapism or the deceitful nature of love affairs. A few of his songs have an autobiographical resonance (such as "Olhei P'ra Trás", where he describes the sorrowful but hopeful departure from his small village or "Deolinda de Jesus", dedicated to his mother).

Leave it for tomorrow
You might as well live today
Because tomorrow who knows if you'll still be here
Oh you know well how life runs away
Even from those who say they're here to stay

Yet another day and you lived nothing
You let the days go by unchanged
When you think of the time you've lost
Then you want to, but it's too late

— Excerpted translation of the song "É p'ra Amanhã", which has procrastination as its theme. The colloquial tone, set by the Portuguese popular saying, "Don't leave for tomorrow what you can do today" reproaches the listener, reminding them of the fleeting nature of time.

=== Influences ===
António Variações was a fervent admirer of the Portuguese poet Fernando Pessoa (dedicating the LP "Dar & Receber" to Pessoa, in a cryptically unfinished sentence, and using one of his poems on the song "Canção") and some of his lyrics share similarities with the feelings expressed on some of Pessoa's poems. Another of the artist's major influences was Amália Rodrigues, a fado singer of international renown. Apart from dedicating his first LP to her and covering one of her songs, he also wrote an ode to the singer, recorded as the song "Voz-Amália-de-Nós", in which he sings "All of us have Amália in our voice and we have in her voice the voice of all of us" (Amália Rodrigues is a Portuguese national icon). Both artists would only meet on stage once, a concert at the Aula Magna of the University of Lisbon, on 26 May 1983. Amália paid back homage to António by attending his funeral celebration.

From his extensive travels abroad, he got acquainted with the work of foreign artists like David Bowie, Bryan Ferry, The Kinks, Elvis Presley and The Beatles. This encounter with a different musical culture left a deep impression on him; a testament to this is the fact that his first song experiments were written in English (although he soon abandoned this approach, in search of a more authentic and personal style of writing, in Portuguese).

=== Collaborators ===
Because Variações did not have the knowledge to properly compose music by himself, collaboration with other musicians at the writing, recording and producing stages was necessary. He would first collaborate with the musicians Vítor Rua, Tóli César Machado (both from the band GNR) and José Moz Carrapa on his first LP, "Anjo da Guarda", and then with Pedro Ayres Magalhães and Carlos Maria Trindade, at the time, part of the band Heróis do Mar (and later, Madredeus) on the recording of "Dar & Receber". The five members of Heróis do Mar acted as António's studio band; they would become close to Variações, especially Pedro Ayres Magalhães, who speaks fondly of him on the liner notes of "Dar & Receber": "I thank you António, for your enthusiasm and trust, and I would like to write here that I've gained a friendship".

== Humanos ==
At the time of his death, Variações left behind a box containing over forty tapes and studio reels, which were forgotten for a long time, at first in the possession of his brother, Jaime Ribeiro. These were then kept for over ten years by David Ferreira at EMI-Valentim de Carvalho, until journalist Nuno Galopim took up the enterprise of listening to and transcribing them, which would become the beginning of the musical project known as Humanos.

== Discography ==
=== Lifetime releases ===
- Singles
  - 1982 - Povo Que Lavas No Rio/Estou Além
  - 1983 - É P'ra Amanhã.../Quando Fala Um Português...
- LPs
  - 1983 - Anjo da Guarda
  - 1984 - Dar & Receber

=== Posthumous releases and remasterings ===
- Singles
  - 1997 - Canção de Engate
  - 1997 - O Corpo É Que Paga/É P'ra Amanhã... (remixed by Nuno Miguel)
  - 1998 - Minha cara sem fronteiras - entre Braga e Nova Iorque
- Albums
  - 1997 - O Melhor de António Variações (best-of)
  - 1998 - Anjo da Guarda (third studio album, includes the bonus track Povo que lavas no rio)
  - 2000 - Dar & Receber (fourth studio album, includes three versions (two of which are remixes) of Minha cara sem fronteiras)
  - 2006 - A História de António Variações - entre Braga e Nova Iorque (best-of which includes previously unreleased demos)

=== Tributes ===
- Cover songs
  - 1987 - Delfins - Canção de Engate
  - 1995 - Amarguinhas - Estou Além
  - 1995 - Íris - Estou Além
  - 1996 - MDA - Dar & Receber
  - 1996 - MDA - Estou Além
  - 1997 - Isabel Sivestre - Deolinda de Jesus
  - 2004 - Donna Maria - Estou Além
  - 2004 - Funkoffandfly - Dar e receber
  - 2005 - RAMP - Anjinho da Guarda
  - 2008 - André Sardet - Anjinho da Guarda
  - 2012 - Tiago Bettencourt - Canção de Engate
  - 2013 - Dead Combo & Márcia - Visões Ficções
  - 2014 - OqueStrada - Parei na Madrugada [inedit song]
  - 2015 - Linda Martini - Visões-ficções
  - 2016 - Telmo Pires - Ao passar por Braga abaixo [inedit song]
  - 2017 - Filipe Catto - Canção de Engate
  - 2017 - União das Tribos feat. Miguel Ângelo - Canção de Engate
  - 2017 - The Beheaded - Canção de Engate
  - 2020 - Lina e Raül Refree - Voz Amália de Nós
  - 2020 - Zeca Baleiro - Canção de Engate
- Albums
  - 1989 - Lena D'Água - Tu Aqui [5 inedit songs of Variações]
  - 1994 - Variações - As canções de António
  - 2004 - Humanos - Humanos [inedit songs of Variações]
  - 2006 - Humanos - Humanos ao Vivo - [1 CD + 2 DVD, inedit songs of Variações]
  - 2019 - Variações - Variações

== Variações (film) ==
A biographical movie about António Variações was released in August 2019 in Portugal. The script was written by film director João Maia and it is a Production by David & Golias, with António's role being portrayed by Sérgio Praia.

== See also ==
- Humanos

== Bibliography ==
- Gonzaga, Manuela; António Variações: Entre Braga e Nova Iorque; Âncora Editora; 2006; ISBN 972-780-174-9
- Variações, António; Muda de Vida; Relógio de Água Editores; 2006; ISBN 972-708-873-2
