= Cintura (album) =

Studio album by Clã
- Released: 2007
- Genre: Pop rock
- Label: EMI - Valentim de Carvalho, Lda

Clã chronology
Vivo (2005)	Cintura (2007)

Cintura (Portuguese for "waist") is the eighth album from the band Clã.

Most songs were written by Hélder Gonçalves and Carlos Tê. Also participated in writing Arnaldo Antunes (Vamos esta Noite, Pra Continuar) and Adolfo Luxúria Canibal (Fábrica de Amores). The album features the guest appearances from Paulo Furtado in Tira a Teima (voice), Fernanda Takai in Amuo (voice) and Mário Barreiros in Sexto Andar (drums).

== Track listing ==
#	Title	Time
01	"Vamos esta Noite!"	3:23
02	"Adeus Amor (Bye Bye)"	3:06
03	"Tira a Teima" (with Paulo Furtado)	3:22
04	"Fábrica de Amores"	2:57
05	"Amuo" (with Fernanda Takai)	03:39
06	"Sexto andar" (with Mário Barreiros)	3:23
07	"Ponto Zero"	03:27
08	"Pra Continuar"	2:17
09	"Pequena Morte"	3:52
10	"Narciso sobre Rodas"	3:14
11	"Mandarim"	2:25
12	"Utilidade do Humor"	4:27
