= Rita Redshoes =

Portuguese singer-songwriter (born 1981)

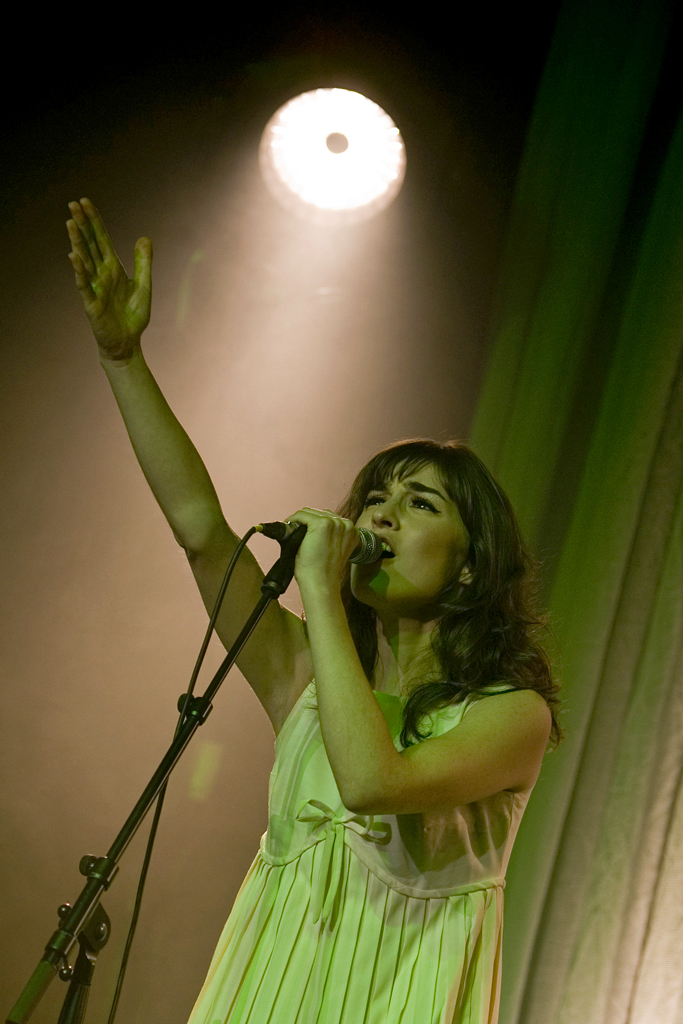
- Rita Redshoes at Coliseu dos Recreios, 12 April 2008

Background information
- Born: Rita Pereira; 10 July 1981 (age 44)
- Origin: Loures, Portugal
- Genres: Alternative rock, pop rock
- Occupations: Singer-songwriter, musician, vocalist, producer
- Instruments: Vocals, piano, guitar, drums, rhodes piano, synthesizer, metallophone
- Years active: 1996–present
- Label: Anjo da Guarda
- Website: ritaredshoes.com

Rita Pereira (born 10 July 1981), known by her stage name Rita Redshoes, is a solo musical artist from Portugal. In 1996 she sang with her first band, Atomic Bees, releasing an album in 2000 entitled love.noises.and.kisses. In 2003, she was invited to sing with David Fonseca, and shared with him the song "Hold Still" from Our Hearts Will Beat As One, his second solo album. In 2008 she released her debut solo album Golden Era. In 2010 the band Snow Patrol invited her to perform the single "Set the fire to the third bar" in Rock in Rio Lisbon.

== Discography ==
- Golden Era (2008)
- Lights & Darks (2010)
- Her (2016)

=== Singles ===
| Year | Title | Chart positions | | Album |
| Year | Title | POR | EUR | Album |
|---|---|---|---|---|
| 2008 | "Hey Tom" | 49 | - | Golden Era |
| 2008 | "Dream On Girl" | 38 | - | Golden Era |
| 2008 | "The Beginning Song" | 16 | - | Golden Era |
| 2009 | "Choose Love" | 24 | - | Golden Era |

== Awards ==
In the MTV Europe Music Awards 2007 they were 8th (out of 19) in the New Sounds of Europe International Competition and were one of the nominees for Best Portuguese Act. In the MTV Europe Music Awards 2008 they were awarded the Best Portuguese Act and were nominees for Best European Act.

=== MTV Europe Music Awards ===
The MTV Europe Music Awards is an annual awards ceremony established in 1994 by MTV Europe.

| Year | Nominee / work | Award | Result |
|---|---|---|---|
| 2008 | Rita Redshoes | Best Portuguese Act | Nominated |

=== Golden Globes ===
The Golden Globes is an annual awards ceremony by SIC.

| Year | Nominee / work | Award | Result |
|---|---|---|---|
| 2009 | Rita Redshoes | Best New Artist | Nominated |
