= Between Waves (album) =

Studio album by David Fonseca
- Released: 2 November 2009
- Genres: Pop, rock, alternative
- Length: 45:14
- Language: English
- Label: Universal Records

David Fonseca chronology
Dreams in Colour (2007)	Between Waves (2009)	Seasons: Rising (2012)

Singles from Between Waves
- 1. "A Cry 4 Love" Released: 31 August 2009; 2. "Stop 4 a Minute" Released: 28 January 2010; 3. "U Know Who I Am" Released: 12 November 2010

Between Waves is the fourth studio album by Portuguese pop rock singer David Fonseca. It was released in Portugal on 2 November 2009. Fonseca wrote all the songs and played or arranged most of the instruments. The first single, "A Cry 4 Love", was available online for more than a month before the release of the album. The album hit #1 on the Portuguese iTunes chart the same week it was released, hist third album to do so.

== Track listing ==
No.	Title	Length
1.	"(Baby) All I Ever Wanted"	4:31
2.	"Walk Away When You're Winning"	3:40
3.	"A Cry 4 Love"	3:55
4.	"U Know Who I Am"	3:43
5.	"There's Nothing Wrong with Us"	4:37
6.	"Owner of Her Heart"	3:41
7.	"It's Just a Dream II"	3:36
8.	"Little Things II"	4:10
9.	"Stop 4 a Minute"	4:01
10.	"Morning Tide (I Just Can't Remember)"	4:32
11.	"This One's So Different"	4:48
Total length:		45:14
