= Carrazedo (Amares) =

- Civil parish
- Location in Portugal
- Coordinates: 41.629°N 8.387°W
- Country: Portugal
- Region: Norte
- Intermunic. comm.: Cávado
- District: Braga
- Municipality: Amares

Area
  - Total: 2.71 km^{2} (1.05 sq mi)

Population (2011)
  - Total: 732
  - Density: 270/km^{2} (700/sq mi)
- Time zone: UTC+00:00 (WET)
  - Summer (DST): UTC+01:00 (WEST)

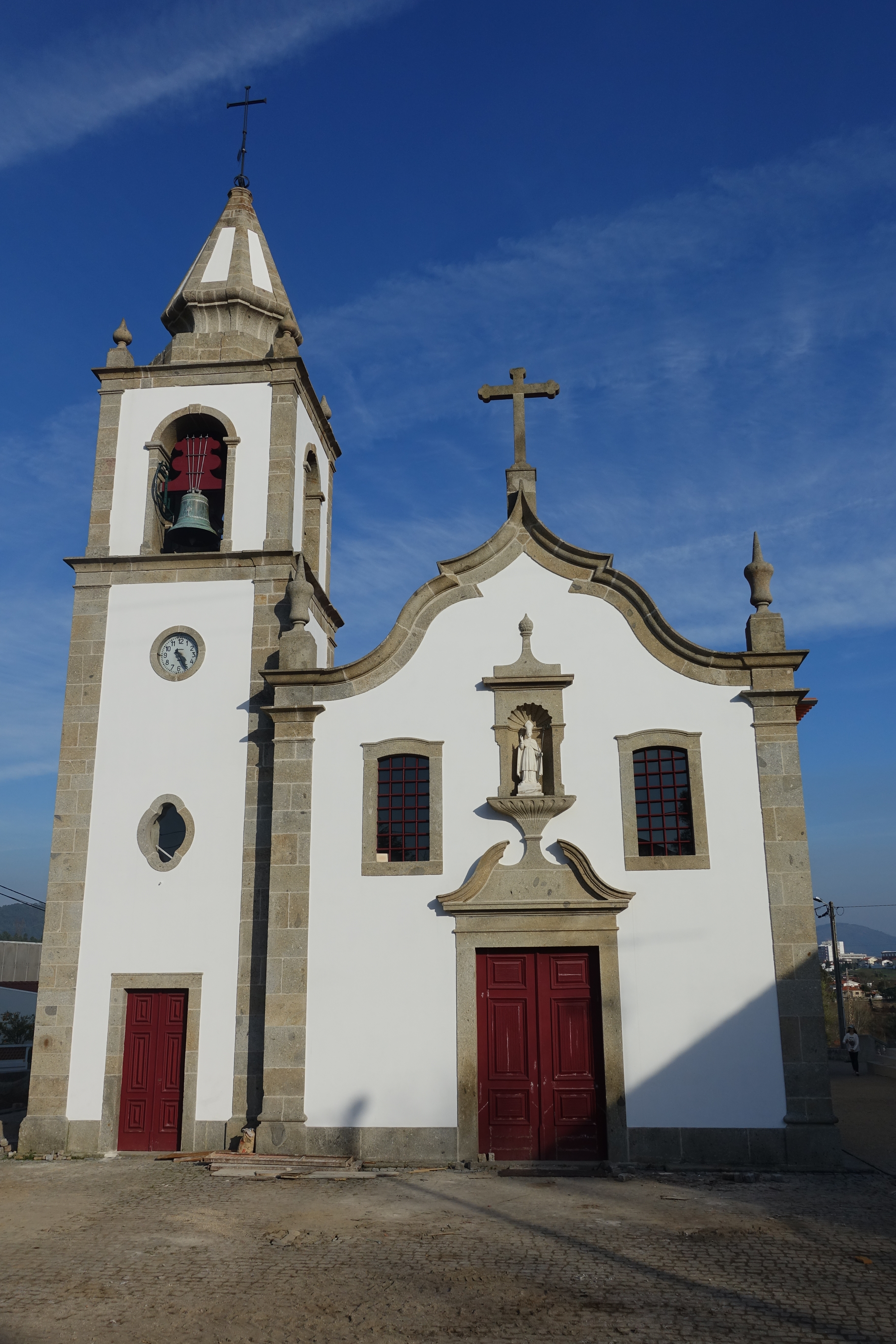

Carrazedo is a civil parish in the municipality of Amares, Portugal. The population in 2011 was 732, in an area of 2.71 km^{2}.
