= João Cardoso (musician) =

Portuguese musician

João Cardoso is a Portuguese musician playing piano and keyboards. He is a member of Portuguese indie rock band Bunnyranch where he plays piano, keyboards and vocals alongside fellow band members Carlos Mendes (drums, vocals, percussion), Pedro Calhau (bass) and Augusto Cardoso (guitar).

For the period 2004 to 2006, he was involved in the Humanos project and took part in the release of two highly successful albums as part of Humanos, namely Humanos (2004) and Humanos ao Vivo in 2006.

== Discography ==
With Bunnyranch

- 2004: Trying to Lose

With Humanos

- 2004: Humanos
- 2006: Humanos ao Vivo (Live album)
