= Clã =

Portuguese pop rock band

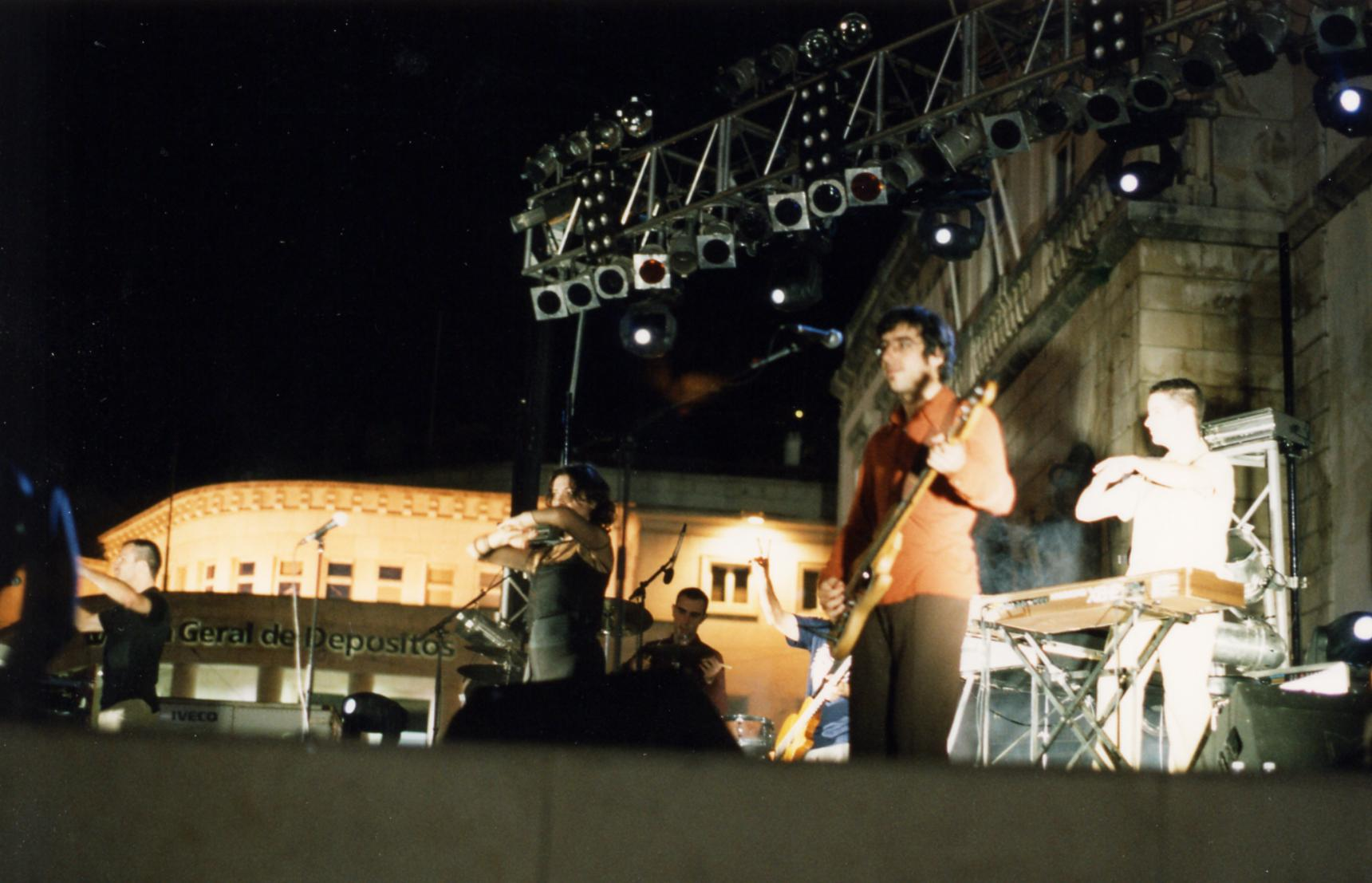
- Coimbra, 2001/07/26

Background information
- Origin: Portugal
- Genres: Pop rock
- Years active: 1992–present
- Label: EMI
- Members: Manuela Azevedo; Hélder Gonçalves; Miguel Ferreira; Pedro Biscaia (keyboards); Pedro Oliveira (drums); Pedro Santos (bass)
- Past members: Pedro Rito (bass); Fernando Gonçalves (drums)
- Website: www.cla.pt

Clã is a Portuguese pop rock band of a mixed nature in terms of style, ranging from moments of pure balladry, through jazzy details, to enthusiastic pop songs.

== Biography ==
The band was formed in November 1992 in the city of Porto, consisting of Hélder Gonçalves (guitar), Fernando Gonçalves, Manuela Azevedo (voice), Pedro Rito (bass), Miguel Ferreira (keyboards) and Pedro Biscaia (keyboards).

Their first album LusoQualquerCoisa was released in 1996. In 1997 they released the album Kazoo.

Their third record Lustro was released in 2000. With it they won the Blitz Awards for Best Female Vocal, Best National Band and Best National Album. Lustro was also released in France, and the band played in Paris, Bordeaux and Barcelona.

Interested in art as a whole, Clã were invited by Porto 2001 – Portuguese Capital of Culture - to compose and play live an original soundtrack for a classical silent movie. The band chose Murnau's Nosferatu (1922).

Rosa Carne, the fourth album, was considered by critics one of the most important albums of 2004. Vivo and the DVD Gordo Segredo were released in 2005. The band released their album Cintura in 2007.

They are known by these main singles: Pois É! (1996), Problema de Expressão (1997) and O Sopro do Coração (2000).

== Discography ==
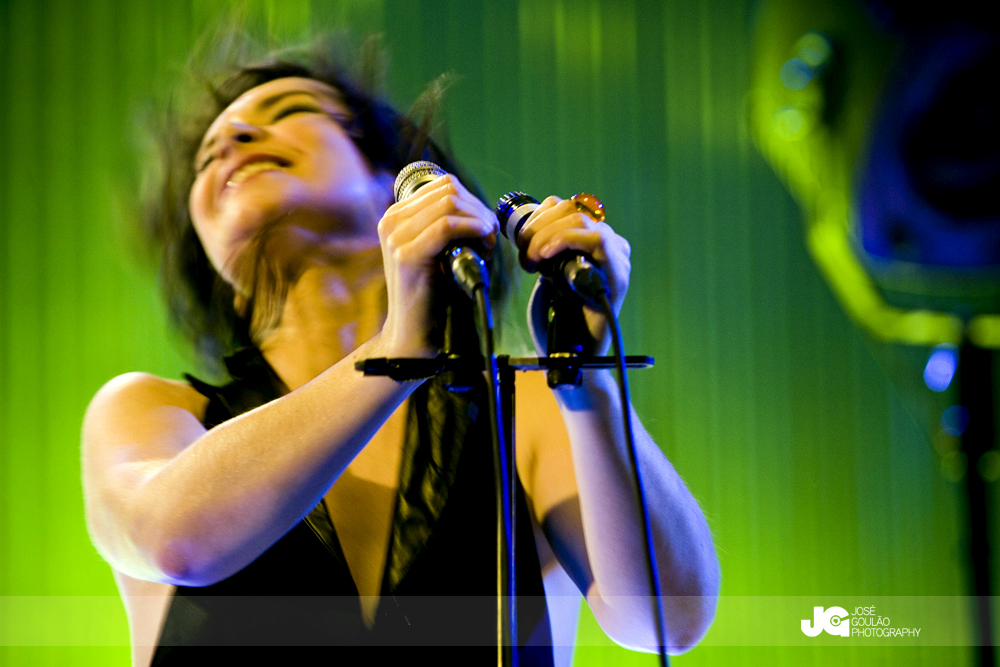
Manuela Azevedo, the lead singer

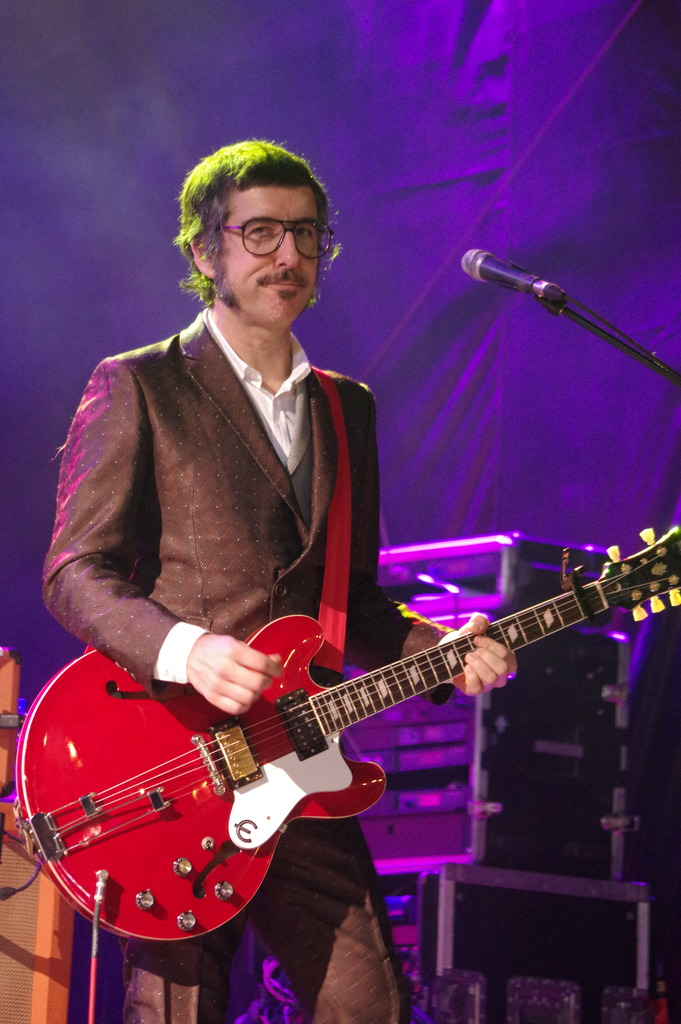
Hélder Gonçalves playing with Clã in Coimbra, 2015-12-31

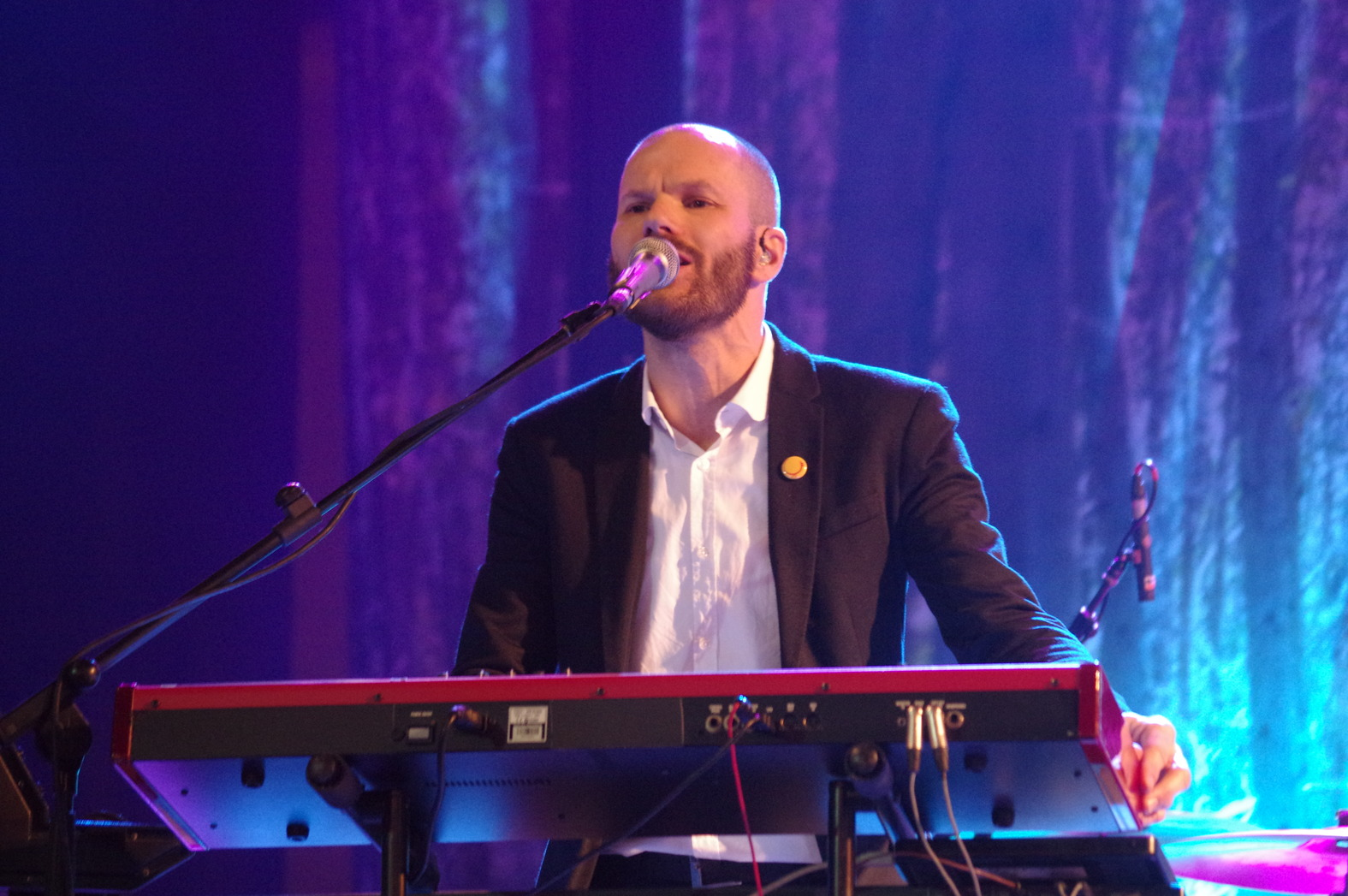
Miguel Ferreira, keyboard player and singer with Clã, 2015-12-31

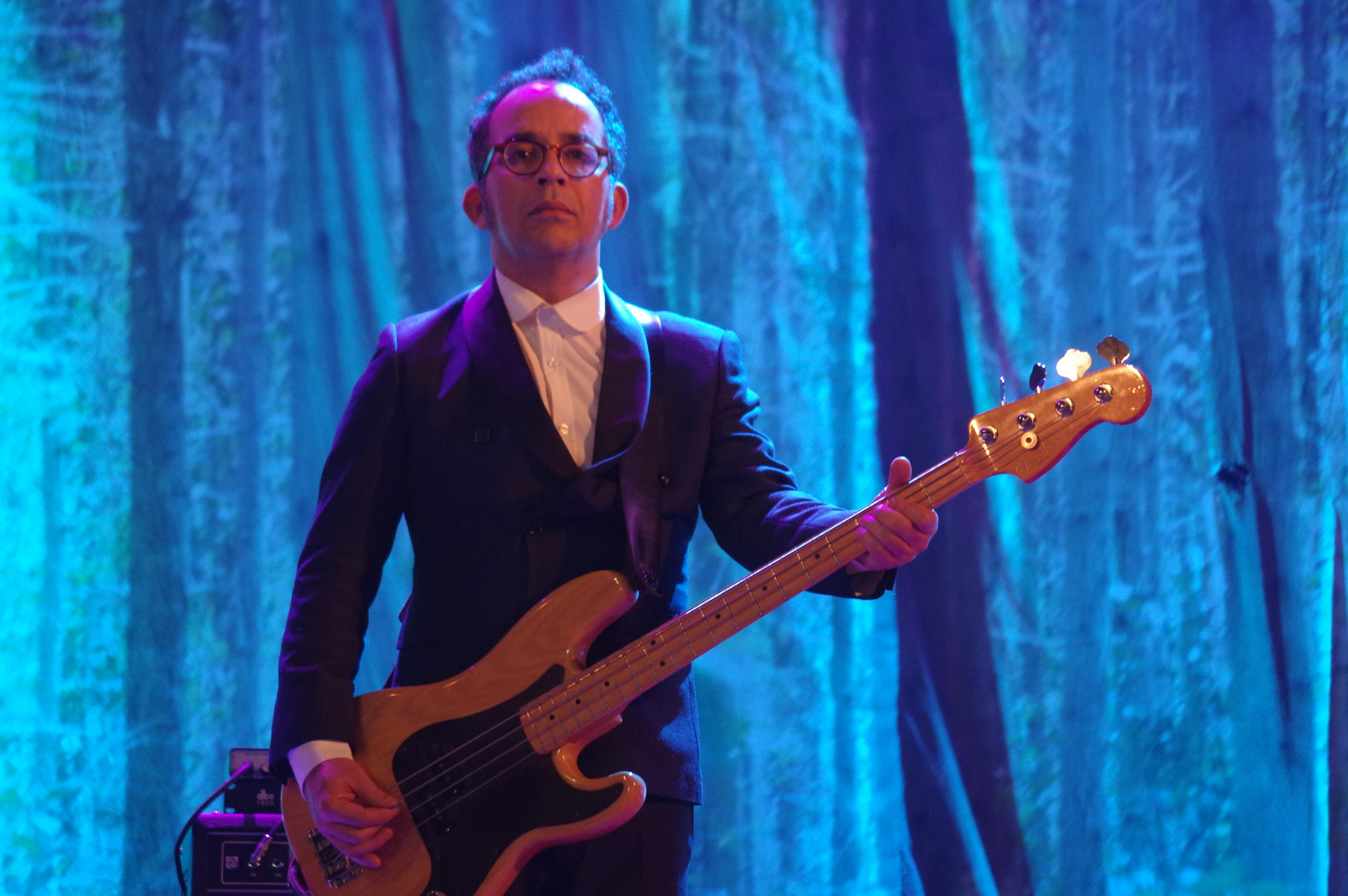
Pedro Rito, bass player with Clã, 2015-12-31

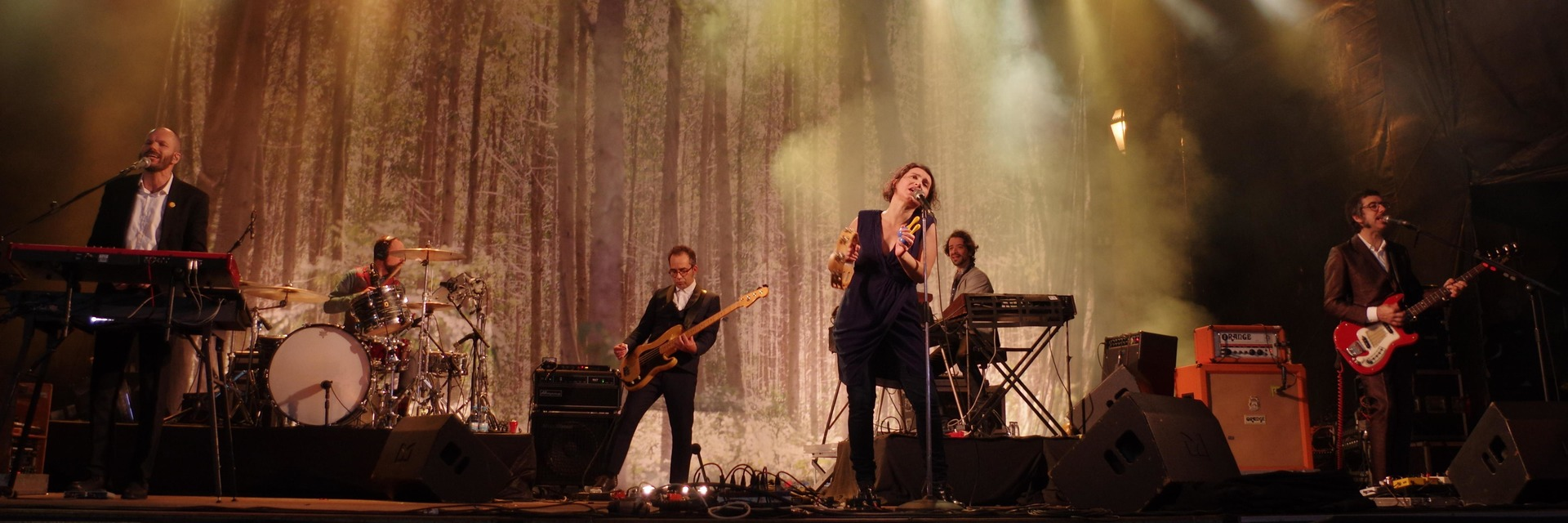
Clã playing in Coimbra, 2015-12-31

=== Studio albums ===
- LusoQUALQUERcoisa (EMI, 1996)
- Kazoo (EMI, 1997)
- Lustro (EMI, 2000)
- Rosa Carne (EMI, 2004)
- Cintura (EMI, 2007)
- Disco Voador (EMI, 2011)
- Corrente (Warner, 2014)
- Nura Pakhang (Eu e Tu) (2017)
- Fã (2017)
- Véspera (2020)

=== Live albums ===
- Afinidades (live with Sergio Godinho) (EMI, 2001)
- Vivo (EMI, 2005) (2CD - live)

=== Video releases ===
- Gordo Segredo (DVD) (EMI, 2005)

=== Singles ===
- Pois É !
- Novas Babilónias / Ver Uma Mulher
- Ao Vivo na Antena 3 (EMI PROMO 16/97)
- G.T.I. (Gentle, Tall & Intelligent)
- Problema de Expressão
- Sem Freio / I'm Free
- Conta-me Histórias
- Dançar na Corda Bamba
- O Sopro do Coração
- H2omem (with Arnaldo Antunes)
- Espectáculo
- Competência Para Amar
- Tira A Teima
- Sexto Andar
- Embeiçados
