= Manuela Azevedo =

Portuguese singer (born 1970)

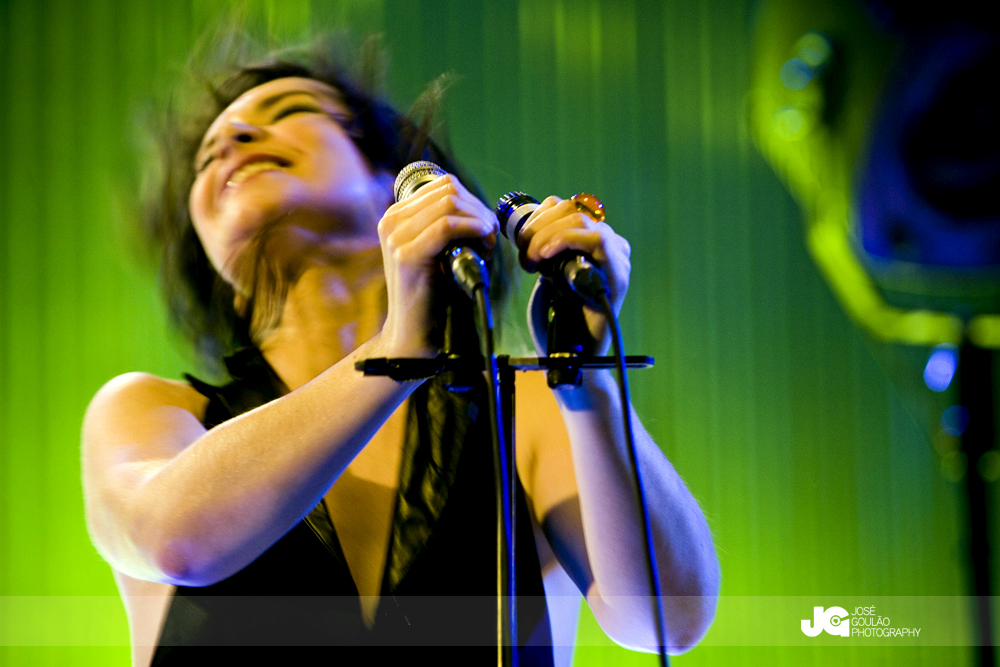

Background information
- Born: 5 May 1970 (age 56)
- Origin: Portugal
- Genres: Pop-Rock
- Years active: 1992 - present
- Label: EMI
- Member of: Clã
- Formerly of: Humanos

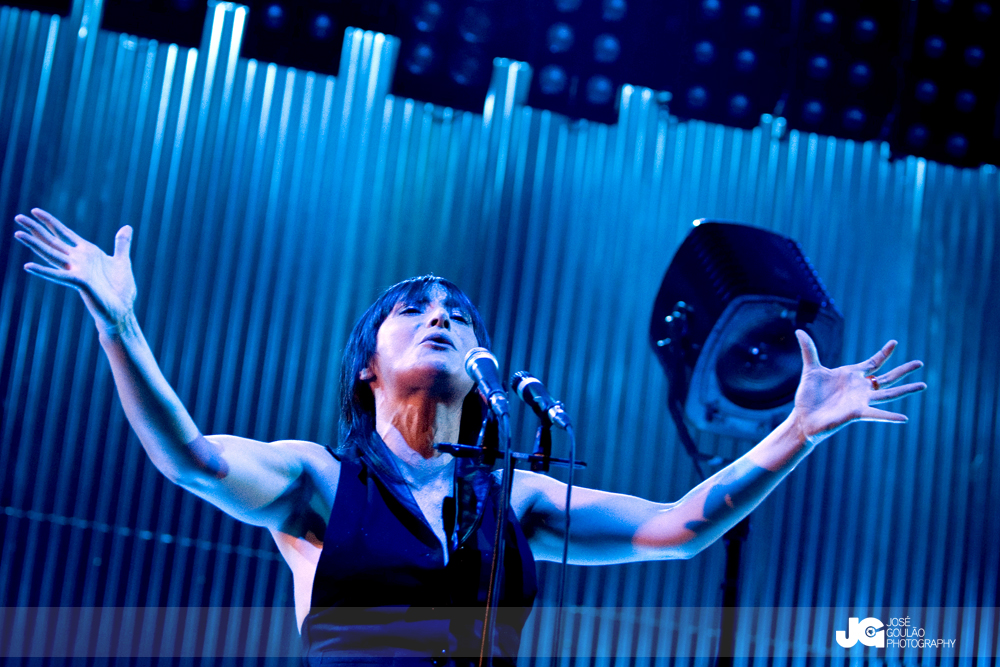

Manuela Azevedo (born 5 May 1970) is a Portuguese singer. She is the lead singer of the Clã band. She was once a member of the Humanos band. Azevedo is also a graduate in law at the University of Coimbra.

== Participation in other projects ==
- Ornatos Violeta (1997) -- «Líbido» e «Letra S»
- Três Tristes Tigres (1999) -- «(Falta) Forma»
- Trovante (1999) -- «Perigo» (em Concerto de Reunião / «Uma Noite Só»)
- Carinhoso (2002) -- «Carinhoso»
- Mola Dudle (2003) -- «Árvore»
- José Peixoto (2003) -- «Caixinha de Pandora»
- Manuel Paulo (2004) -- Malhas Caídas
- Pato Fu (2005) -- «Bom Dia Brasil»
- Arnaldo Antunes (2006) -- «Qualquer» e «Num Dia»
- Brigada Victor Jara (2006) -- «Tirióni»
- Vozes da Rádio (2007) -- «O Pato da Pena Preta»
- Vários (2008)-- «Woman»
- Júlio Resende (2008) -- «Ir (e Voltar)»
- Júlio Pereira (2010) -- «Casa das Histórias»
- Virgem Suta (2010) -- «Linhas Cruzadas»
- Peixe:Avião (2010) -- «Fios de Fumo»
- Pequenos Cantores da Maia (2012) -- «Eu Sou O Pzzim»
- Sensi (2013) -- «Introspecção»
- Galamdum Galundaína (2016) -- «Tanta Pomba»

== Selected concerts ==
- Blind Zero - 27 + 29 January 1999
- Trovante - Maio 1999
- Porto Cantado - Porto 2001
- Concert of the Count Basie Orchestra - Campo Pequeno - October 2008
- Arnaldo Antunes
- Caríssimas Canções de Sérgio Godinho (2013)
- Deixem o Pimba Em Paz (2013) - Bruno Nogueira
- Joining Mitchell - Tribute to Joni Mitchell (2013)
- Coppia (2014) - CCB - Hélder Gonçalves e Victor Hugo Pontes

== Theater ==
- "A Lua de Maria Sem" - play with Maria João Luís (2011)
- "Inesquecível Emília" (2012)
- "Baile" (2015)
- "No Yogurt for the Dead" (2025)
