= Silence 4 =

Portuguese rock band

- Origin: Leiria, Portugal
- Genres: Alternative rock, pop rock
- Years active: 1996–2001, 2013–2014, 2025-present
- Labels: Universal Music
- Members: David Fonseca; Sofia Lisboa; Rui Costa; Tozé Pedrosa

Silence 4 are a Portuguese rock band, formed in Leiria in 1996. The band is composed of David Fonseca (vocals and guitar), Sofia Lisboa (vocals), Rui Costa (bass) and Tozé Pedrosa (drums). They were primarily active from 1996 to 2001, during which they released two commercially successful albums in Portugal, Silence Becomes It (1998) and Only Pain Is Real (2000). Their songs are primarily in English.

After the band disbanded in 2001, they reunited in 2014 for a series of concerts, after vocalist Sofia Lisboa successfully underwent cancer treatment. The band reunited once again in 2025 for a new series of concerts to celebrate the 30th anniversary of the band formation.

== History ==
=== Formation ===
The band's genesis took place in 1995. After good feedback from showing some demo tapes to a music shop owner in Leiria, David Fonseca approached Sofia Lisboa with the idea of forming a band. That idea only materialized one year later, when both of them invited Rui Costa to the band — who suggested they turn off the amplifiers and play acoustic, in silence.

They won a 500,000 escudos (roughly 2,500 euros) prize in a band festival, which was spent totally in making demos. When presenting these to labels, the answer was always the same: "Singing in English? No way!" Refusing to balk at the demand of recording totally in Portuguese, they ended up recording a cover of Erasure's A Little Respect, which was included in the compilation Sons de Todas as Cores (released in 1998), giving it massive airplay and good critical response.

=== Silence Becomes It ===
Polygram (now Universal) finally accepted to work with them, but with some restrictions: minimum budget (5 million escudos — 25 thousand euros), and they would only receive royalties after selling 10 thousand records. The resulting album was Silence Becomes It, which was certified platinum 5 times (over 200 thousand records sold), spending months on top of the Portuguese charts. A national tour ensued, with 90 concerts in 6 months. On December 18, the legendary Pavilhão Atlântico concert took place.

=== Only Pain Is Real ===
They kept touring in 1999, though with less concerts. Then came a period of absence, when they "escaped" to London. It was there, at the Ridge Farm Studio, that their second album, Only Pain Is Real, was born. The album was presented in Leiria, in 2000, and took 2 weeks to reach platinum certification. Then came another tour, with over 100 concerts in one year, ending with two unique concerts at the Coliseu dos Recreios in Lisbon, on December 19 and 20.

== Members ==
- David Fonseca - lead vocals, guitar
- Sofia Lisboa - backing vocals
- Rui Costa - bass guitar
- Tozé Pedrosa - drums

== Discography ==
=== Studio albums ===
- Silence Becomes It (1998)
- Only Pain Is Real (2000)

=== Live albums ===
- Ao Vivo - Coliseu dos Recreios (2004)
- SongBook Live 2014 (2014)
