= List of Portuguese singers =

The following is a list of Portuguese individual singers in alphabetical order.

== A ==
- Adelaide Ferreira
- Adolfo Luxúria Canibal
- Adriano Correia de Oliveira
- Afonso Dias
- Agir
- Alberto Ribeiro
- Alfredo Marceneiro
- Amália Rodrigues
- Amélia Muge
- Ana da Silva
- Ana Free
- Ana Malhoa
- Ana Moura
- Anabela
- André Sardet
- Angélico Vieira
- Anita Guerreiro
- António Avelar de Pinho
- António Calvário
- António D'Andrade
- António Rocha
- António Sala
- António Variações
- António Zambujo
- April Ivy
- Argentina Santos
- Armando Gama
- Aurea

== B ==
- Bárbara Bandeira
- Bárbara Tinoco
- Beatriz da Conceição
- Beto
- Bispo
- Blaya
- Boss AC

== C ==
- Camané
- Cândida Branca Flor
- Capicua
- Carla Prata
- Carlos do Carmo
- Carlos Mendes
- Carlos Nóbrega
- Carlos Paião
- Carlos Quintas
- Carmen Miranda
- Carmen Souza
- Carmen Susana Simões
- Carminho
- Carolina Deslandes
- Catarina Miranda
- Cátia Mazari Oliveira
- Celeste Rodrigues
- Clara D'Ovar
- Cláudia Pascoal
- Claudisabel
- Conan Osiris
- Corina Freire
- Cristina Branco
- Cuca Roseta

== D ==
- Daniela Varela
- David Carreira
- David Fonseca
- Débora Gonçalves
- Dengaz
- Diana Lucas
- Diana Piedade
- Dina
- Dino D'Santiago
- Diogo Piçarra
- Dora
- Duarte Mendes
- Dulce Pontes

== E ==
- Eduardo Nascimento
- Elisa Silva
- Elisabete Matos
- Ercília Costa
- Eugénia Melo e Castro
- Evelina Pereira

== F ==
- Fausto Bordalo Dias
- Fernando Daniel
- Fernando Machado Soares
- Fernando Maurício
- Fernando Ribeiro
- Fernando Tordo
- Filipa Azevedo
- Filipa Sousa
- Filipe Pinto
- Francisco D'Andrade

== G ==
- G-Amado
- General D
- Germano Rocha
- Gisela João
- Guida Costa

== H ==
- Helder Moutinho
- Henrique Feist
- Herman José
- Hermínia Silva

== I ==
- IAMDDB
- Inês Herédia
- Inês Thomas Almeida
- Iolanda
- Isabel Rubio Ricciolini
- Isaura

== J ==
- Jennifer Smith
- João Borsch
- João Loureiro
- João Maria Tudela
- João Pedro Pais
- Joaquim Costa
- Joaquim Pimentel
- Jorge Chaminé
- Jorge Palma
- José Carlos Xavier
- José Cid
- José Mário Branco
- José Pinhal
- JP Simões

== K ==
- Kátia Aveiro
- Katia Guerreiro

== L ==
- Lata Gouveia
- Lena d'Água
- Leonor Andrade
- Linda de Suza
- Lizzy's Husband
- Lomelino Silva
- Lon3r Johny
- Lucenzo
- Lúcia Moniz
- Luciana Abreu
- Lucília do Carmo
- Luís Gil Bettencourt
- Luís Goes
- Luísa Basto
- Luísa Sobral
- Luísa Todi
- Lula Pena
- Lura

== M ==
- Madalena Alberto
- Madalena Iglésias
- Mafalda Arnauth
- Mafalda Veiga
- Malvina Garrigues
- Manuel Freire
- Manuela Azevedo
- Manuela Bravo
- Mara Abrantes
- Márcio Cunha
- Marco Matias
- Maria Alice
- Maria Armanda
- Maria de Vasconcelos
- Maria do Carmo
- Maria Guinot
- Maria João
- Maria José Valério
- Maria Severa-Onofriana
- Maria Teresa de Noronha
- Mariana Bandhold
- Marie Myriam
- Marisa Liz
- Mariza
- Maro
- Marta Dias
- Maurizio Bensaude
- Maximiano de Sousa
- Mazgani
- Mickael Carreira
- Miguel Gameiro
- Miguel Guedes
- Milú
- Mimicat
- Mishlawi
- Mísia
- Monica Sintra
- Murta

== N ==
- Nelly Furtado
- Nenny
- Nico Paulo
- Nininho Vaz Maia
- Nucha
- Nuno Bettencourt
- Nuno Resende
- Nuno Roque

== O ==
- Orlanda Velez Isidro

== P ==
- Paco Bandeira
- Padre José Luís Borga
- Patrícia Candoso
- Patricia Ribeiro
- Paulo Alexandre
- Paulo Brissos
- Paulo de Carvalho
- Paulo Flores
- Paulo Gonzo
- Paulo Sousa
- Pedro Abrunhosa
- Pedro Luís Neves
- Pedro Madeira
- Pilar Homem de Melo
- Piruka
- Plutónio
- ProfJam

== Q ==
- Quim Barreiros

== R ==
- Raquel Camarinha
- Raquel Guerra
- Raquel Tavares
- Regina Pacini
- Richie Campbell
- Rita Damásio
- Rita Guerra
- Rita Redshoes
- Roberto Leal
- Rosinha
- Rouxinol Faduncho
- Rui Bandeira
- Rui Drumond
- Rui Reininho
- Rui Veloso

== S ==
- Sabrina
- Salvador Sobral
- Sam the Kid
- Sara Braga Simões
- Sara Correia
- Sara Serpa
- Sara Tavares
- Sérgio Godinho
- Simone de Oliveira
- SippinPurpp
- Slimmy
- Slow J
- Sofia Escobar
- Sofia Hoffmann
- Sofia Lisboa
- Sofia Vitória
- Susana Félix
- Susana Gaspar
- Suspiria Franklyn
- Suzy

== T ==
- TAY
- Teresa Salgueiro
- Teresinha Landeiro
- Tiago Bettencourt
- Tito Schipa Jr.
- Tó Cruz
- Tonicha
- Tony Carreira

== V ==
- Valete
- Vânia Fernandes
- Vitorino

== W ==
- WAY 45 (Rafael Leão)
- Wet Bed Gang

== Y ==
- Yolanda Soares

== Z ==
- Zé Cabra
- Zeca Afonso

== See also ==
- List of Portuguese musicians
- List of Portuguese bands
