= Turn It Up =

Turn It Up may refer to:

== Film and television ==
- Turn It Up (film), a 2000 American action hood film
- Turn It Up!, a 1990 American television game show
- Turn It Up! (Australian TV series), a 1990s Australian music television show

== Music ==
=== Albums ===
- Turn It Up (Pixie Lott album) or the title song (see below), 2009
- Turn It Up (Rare Essence album) or the tile song, 2016
- Turn It Up (Shannon Noll album), 2007
- Turn It Up (Josh Thompson album) or the title song, 2014
- Turn It Up (Treacherous Three album) or the title song, 2000
- Turn It Up! The Very Best of Busta Rhymes or the title song (see below), 1998
- Turn It Up, by IG Culture (recording as NSM), 2004
- Austin & Ally: Turn It Up, 2013

=== Songs ===
- "Turn It Up" (Armin van Buuren song), 2019
- "Turn It Up" (Brandy song), 2003
- "Turn It Up" (Chamillionaire song), 2005
- "Turn It Up" (The Feeling song), 2008
- "Turn It Up" (Johntá Austin song), 2006
- "Turn It Up" (Paris Hilton song), 2006
- "Turn It Up" (Peter Andre song), 1995
- "Turn It Up" (PinkPantheress song), 2024
- "Turn It Up" (Pixie Lott song), 2010
- "Turn It Up" (R.O.N.N. & CeCe Peniston song), originally "In Love with a DJ", 2010
- "Turn It Up" (Sean Paul song), 2013
- "Turn It Up" (Texas Hippie Coalition song), 2012
- "Turn It Up" (T.O.P song), 2010
- "Turn It Up" (Ultra Naté song), 2011
- "Turn It Up", by A from How Ace Are Buildings, 1997
- "Turn It Up", by Alan Parsons from Try Anything Once, 1993
- "Turn It Up", by Alesha Dixon from Fired Up, 2006
- "Turn It Up", by Anitta from Versions of Me, 2022
- "Turn It Up", by the Bamboos, 2009
- "Turn It Up", by Blur from Modern Life Is Rubbish, 1993
- "Turn It Up", by Bomfunk MC's from Reverse Psychology, 2004
- "Turn It Up", by Busta Rhymes from When Disaster Strikes..., remixed as "Turn It Up (Remix)/Fire It Up", 1998
- "Turn It Up", by Carlos Nóbrega, 2012
- "Turn It Up", by Ciara from Basic Instinct, 2010
- "Turn It Up", by Grum, 2010
- "Turn It Up", by Kelly Rowland from Here I Am, 2011
- "Turn It Up", by Kyle, 2005
- "Turn It Up", by Kym Sims, 2017
- "Turn It Up", by Masta Ace Incorporated from Sittin' on Chrome, 1995
- "Turn It Up", by Mishon Ratliff, 2010
- "Turn It Up", by Ricki-Lee Coulter from Ricki-Lee, 2005
- "Turn It Up", by Robots in Disguise from Get RID!, 2005
- "Turn It Up!", by Sonic Syndicate from We Rule the Night, 2010
- "Turn It Up", by Stereos from Stereos, 2009
- "Turn It Up", by Technotronic, 1990
- "Turn It Up", by Ted Nugent from Free-for-All, 1976
- "Turn It Up", by Twice from Fancy You, 2019
- "Turn It Up", by Wanessa Camargo, 2013
