= Luisa Todí National Singing Competition =

Portuguese singing competition

The Luisa Todí National Singing Competition is a singing contest conceived and founded by José Carlos Xavier, an operatic tenor and singing teacher at the Lisbon National Conservatory of Music.

The contest first took place in 1990, in the city of Setúbal, aiming to honor the Portuguese mezzo-soprano opera singer Luísa Todi.

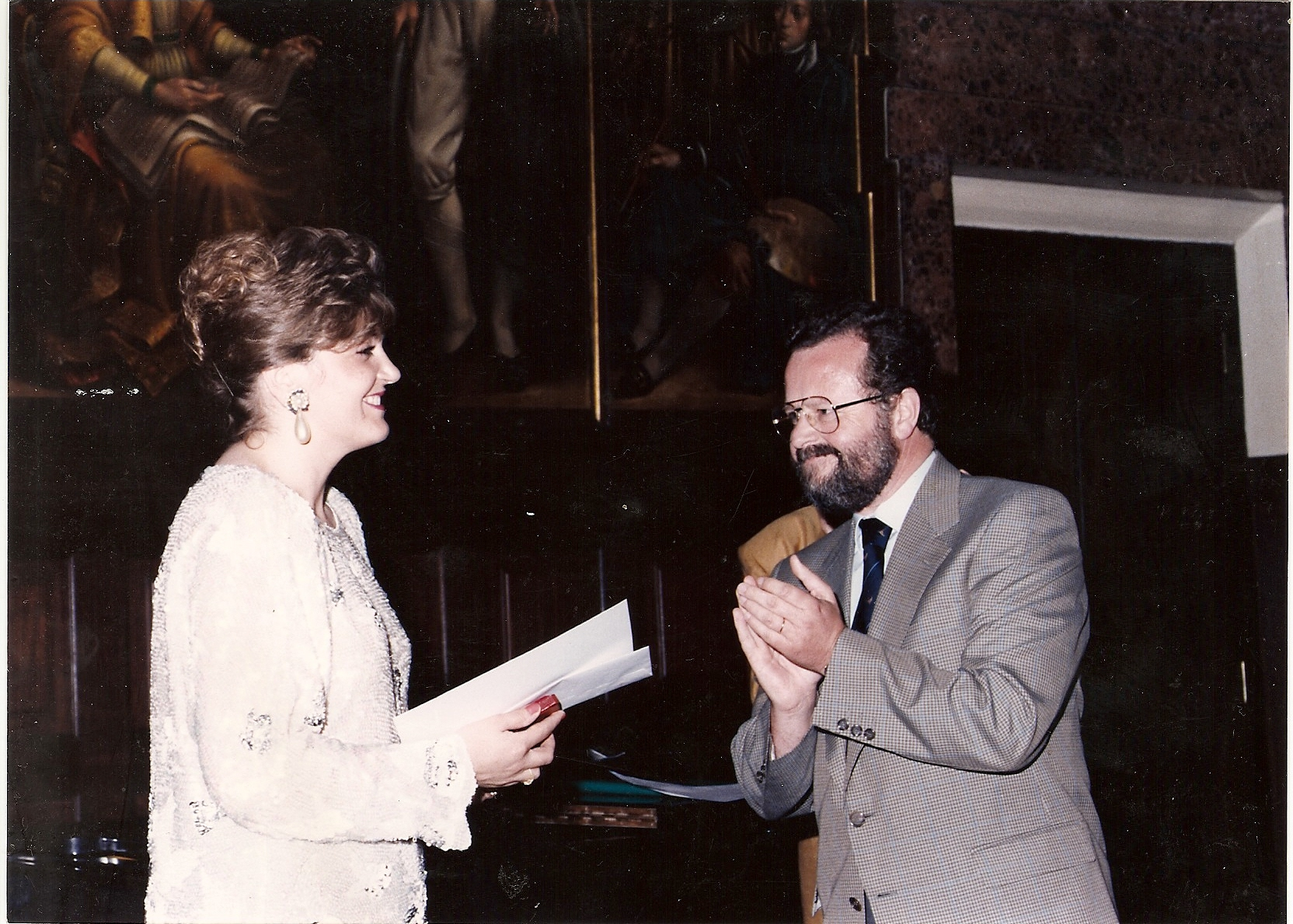
Elisabete Matos, first prize in the Luisa Todí National Singing Competition in 1991

The biennial competitions aim is the promotion of national and young singers, the jury is made up some of the most prestigious figures of the Portuguese and international music scenes.

== History ==
=== Contestant awards ===
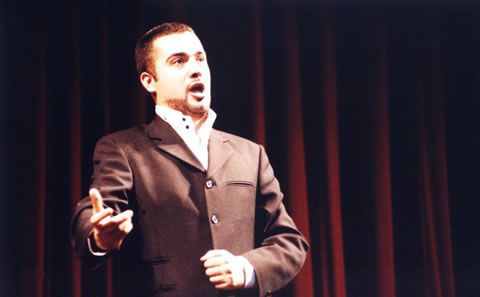
Bruno Ribeiro, first prize in the Luisa Todí National Singing Competition in 2003

Year	Contestant	Prize
2011	Raquel Camarinha, Carlos Cardoso	1st prize
2011	Carla Simões, Job Tomé	2nd prize
2011	Liliana Sebastião, Hugo Oliveira	3rd prize
2007	Dora Rodrigues, Paulo Ferreira	1st prize
2007	Maria Luisa de Freitas, Fernando Guimarães	2nd prize
2007	Raquel Alão,Nuno Dias	3rd prize
2005	Carla Caramujo,Diogo Oliveira	1st prize
2005	Inez Calazans, Sara Braga Simões	2nd prize
2005	Susana Duarte, João Oliveira	3rd prize
2003	Bruno Ribeiro	1st prize
2003	Maria João Matos	2nd prize
2003	Armando Possante	3rd prize
1996	Luís Rodrigues	1st prize
1996	Mário Alves	2nd prize
1996	Paulo Ferreira	3rd prize
1994	Sílvia Mateus	1st prize
1994	Rosário Ferreira	2nd prize
1994	Teresa Manezes	3rd prize
1991	Elizabete Matos	1st prize
1991	Nuno Viallonga	2rd prize
1990	Ana Ester Neves	1st prize
1990	Nuno Viallonga	2nd prize
1990	Deolinda Rezende	3rd prize

=== Members of the jury ===
Names	Role
José Carlos Xavier	President of the Competition
Elsa Saque	Honorary Member
Mara Zampieri, Elsa Saque, Alvaro Malta, João Pereira Bastos	Presidents of the Jury
Elisabete Matos, Elsa Saque, Elvira Ferreira, Helena Pina Manique, Joana Silva, Maria Cristina de Castro, Palmira Troufa, Rosana Caramaschi, Bruno Michel, Cesário Costa, Ernesto Palácio, Fernando Eldoro, Jorge Vaz de Carvalho, José Carlos Xavier, José Fardilha, José de Oliveira Lopes, José Ribeiro da Fonte, José Serra Formigal, Manuel Ivo Cruz, Miguel Graça Moura, Nuno Pólvora, Paulo Ferreira de Castro, Silva Pereira	Jury

=== Official pianists ===
Name
Patrícia Valadão
Armando Vidal
João Crisóstomo
Nicholas McNair

=== Administrative and logistical support ===
- 1990-1996: Luisa Todi Academy of Music and Fine Arts ..
- 2003-2011: Setúbal City Hall.
