= Mara Zampieri =

Italian operatic soprano

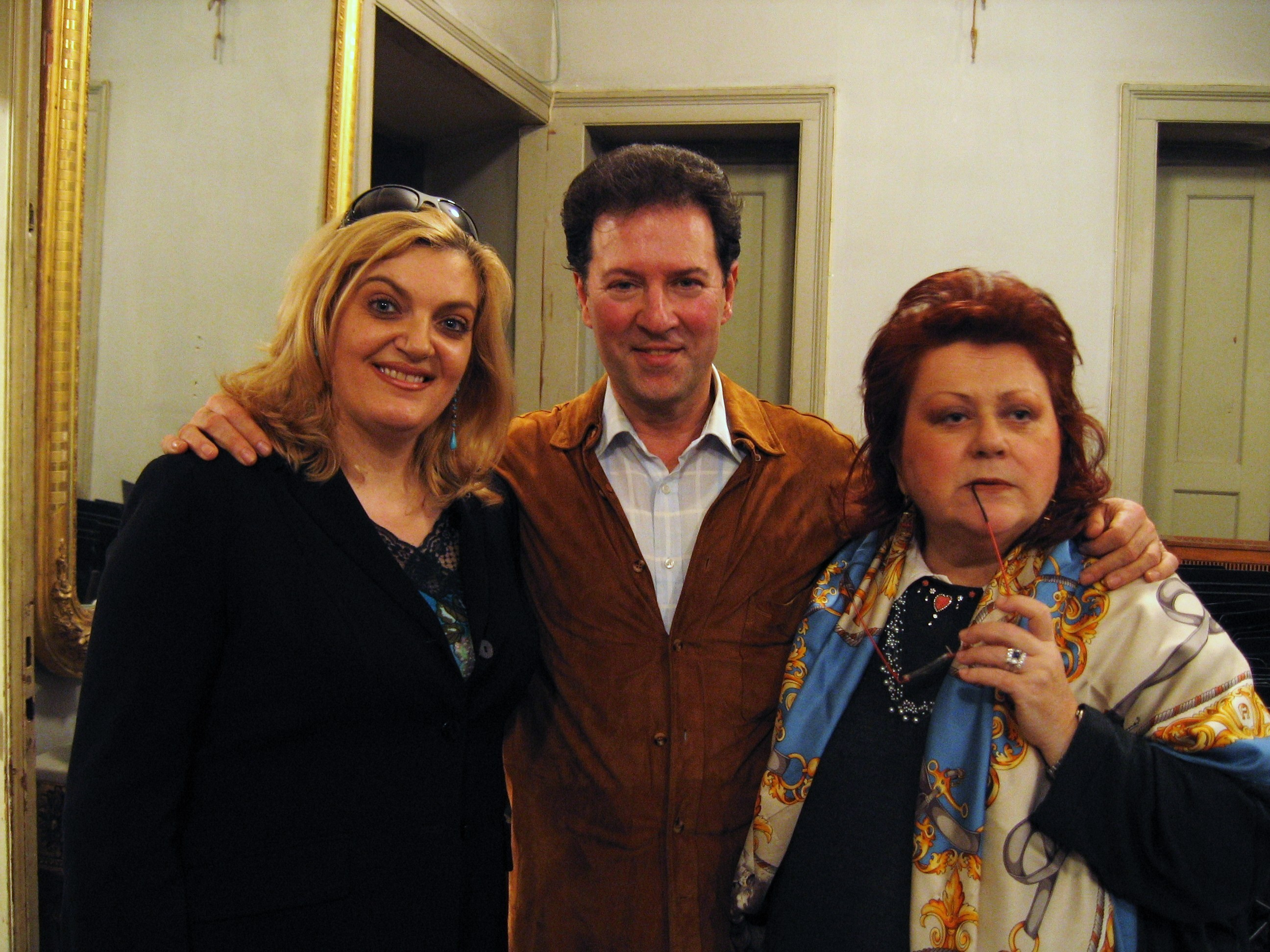
Zampieri (right) with José Carlos Xavier and Elisabete Matos in 2011, at S. Carlos Opera, Lisbon.

Mara Zampieri (born 30 January 1951 in Padua) is an Italian operatic soprano. She trained at Padua Conservatory.

Zampieri has performed in the opera houses of Europe, including Milan, London, Berlin, Munich, Paris, Zurich, Madrid, Barcelona, Lisbon and Vienna; also in San Francisco, New York, Buenos Aires, and Tokyo. She has performed in more than fifty operatic roles, including twenty-one in operas by Verdi.

She favors Italian but she also famously performed in the title role of Richard Strauss's Salome.

She can be seen on video as Lady Macbeth opposite Renato Bruson, and as Minnie in La fanciulla del West.
