= Paleka =

Paleka (born 4 October 1954, in Lisbon) is a Portuguese percussionist in the genres of jazz, contemporary music, and world music.

== Career ==
He is one of the four musicians in O Quarteto, the first ensemble to have emerged from Portugal's first school of jazz. The school, now known as Escola de Jazz Luís Villas-Boas, was opened in the late 1970s and led by bass player Zé Eduardo.

Paleka has performed and recorded with the country's most respected pop, rock, and jazz musicians, including Sérgio Godinho, Jorge Palma, Mário Laginha, António Pinho Vargas, and Rui Veloso.

Some of Paleka's first televised appearances were for the state television station RTP1 on Luis Vilas-Boas's program "Club de Jazz" as part of the house band alongside Mário Laginha and Carlos Barretto.

In 1979, he performed in the Quinteto Pedro Mestre at the 9th Cascais Jazz Festival, this was his first appearance in international jazz fests.

He has also shared the stage repeatedly with many others such as Steve Potts, Zé Eduardo, Carlos Azevedo.

He has been involved in multi-media projects alongside Miguel Valle de Figueiredo (photographer), and Guida Almeida (visual artist) among others.

His influences include Peter Erskine, Steve Gadd, and Tony Williams among others.

== Discography ==
Recordings featuring Paleka include:

- Guardador de Margens (Rui Veloso)
- Acto Continuo (Jorge Palma)
- Bit (Bit)
- Tinta Permanente (Sérgio Godinho)
- Aos Amores (Sérgio Godinho)
- Noites passadas (Sérgio Godinho)
- Rivolitz (Sérgio Godinho) – also recorded as video / DVD
- Mar Português (Companhia Bengala)
- Crepúsculo do Vinho (Kinteto António Ferro)
- Viragens (Quinteto de Jazz de Lisboa)
- Coisas do Fado (Quinteto de Jazz de Lisboa)

== Festivals ==
He has performed at festivals such as:

- Seville International Jazz Festival (Spain) — with the Mike Ross Quartet
- 500th anniversary of the Founding of Brazil (Rio de Janeiro/São Paulo, Brazil) — with Sérgio Godinho and Milton Nascimento
- Oporto European Jazz Festival (Portugal) — 3 por 4 with John Schröder
- Seville International Jazz Festival (Spain) — with Kai Winding
- Macau International Jazz Festival (Macau) — António Ferro Quintet
- Festival de Canto-Autor (Sanremo, Italy) — with Sérgio Godinho
- World Music Festival (Rotterdam, Netherlands) — with Sérgio Godinho
- World Music Festival (Bonn, Germany) — Músicas de Sol e de Lua (Godinho, Vitorino, Felipa Pais, Janita e Rão Kyao)
- Maré de Agosto Festival on the Santa Maria Island, Azores (Portugal) — with Lindumona
- Eurovision Counter-Festival (Brussels, Belgium) — Sérgio Godinho
- Algarve International Jazz Festival (Faro, Portugal) – O Quarteto
- 9th Cascais International Jazz Festival (Portugal) — Pedro Mestre Quintet
- Sete Sois Sete Luas International Festival (Pisa, Italy) — with Sérgio Godinho
- 14th Cascais International Jazz Festival (Portugal) — with Rui Veloso
- Algarve Jazz (Faro, Portugal) — Kinteto António Ferro
- Guimarães Jazz (Portugal) — Ana Alves Quintet
- Guimarães Jazz (Portugal) — Kinteto António Ferro
- Festival Maré de Agosto (Santa Maria) — with Sérgio Godinho
- Maré de Agosto Festival (Santa Maria) — with Sérgio Godinho
