= Eurico Tomás de Lima =

Portuguese pianist, composer (1908–1989)

Eurico Tomás de Lima (Ponta Delgada, Açores, 17 December 1908 – Maia, 8 June 1989) was a Portuguese pianist, composer and pedagogue.

== Life ==
Eurico Tomás de Lima was the son of António Tomás de Lima, a violinist, composer, conductor and professor at the National Conservatory in Lisbon. He also studied at the National Conservatory, from 1921 to 1929. He studied piano with Alexandre Rey Colaço and José Viana da Mota, aesthetics and music history with Luís de Freitas Branco, and composition with Hermínio do Nascimento. In 1929, he finished the Virtuosity degree, graduating summa cum laude ("Distinção e Louvor").

In 1932, he presented for the first time a solo piano recital playing only his own compositions. Apart from his own works, his preferences in piano music lean towards "Beethoven, Chopin, Liszt and all of the masters of the slavic school."

In 1940 and 1941, he took part in the Cultural Missions of the Secretariat for National Propaganda, at the invitation of the minister António Ferro. In these chamber music recitals throughout the country, he collaborated with cellist Madalena Moreira de Sá e Costa, violinist Paulo Manso and soprano Leonor Bívar Viana da Mota. Also in 1941, he was awarded a composition prize from National Radio (Emissora Nacional de Radiodifusão): the First Prize – Golden Poppy, in the Flower Games (Jogos Florais) competition.

In 1949, and again 1952, he toured Brazil to great acclaim.

Between 1956 and 1973, he regularly recorded piano recitals for Emissora Nacional, playing mainly his own works. However, he also gave special attention to Portuguese piano music, as seen in a recital, recorded in 1970, devoted in its entirety to works by Óscar da Silva (1870–1958), a Portuguese pianist and composer who studied in Germany with Carl Reinecke and Clara Schumann. Eurico Tomás de Lima met Óscar da Silva in childhood, and reconnected with him in São Paulo, during his first tour in Brazil. "Tomás de Lima advised [Óscar da Silva] to return to Porto and offered his house to stay, so that his situation wouldn't be a repeat of the fate of Marcos Portugal: it took a hundred years after his death for his remains to return to the motherland!"

Eurico Tomás de Lima was also active as a piano pedagogue. He taught at the following schools: Academia de Amadores de Música (Lisbon), Academia Mozart (Porto), Academia Beethoven (Porto), Academia Parnaso (Porto), Academia de Música e Belas-Artes da Ilha da Madeira, Conservatório Calouste Gulbenkian de Braga. The composer is side by side with the pedagogue, as a large part of Eurico Tomás de Lima's piano compositions (especially his four-hands and two-pianos repertoire) was written for his students. As a testimony of the reach of his didactic works: the Portuguese pianist Artur Pizarro, in his first public appearance in 1971, played a piece by Eurico Tomás de Lima.

== Works for Solo Piano ==
Eurico Tomás de Lima has a substantial catalogue of compositions for solo piano, one of the largest of Portuguese twentieth century. The only Portuguese composers with more works for piano solo are Fernando Lopes Graça, Óscar da Silva and António Victorino d'Almeida. Eurico Tomás de Lima was always very methodical in writing and cataloguing his works: he always wrote down in his manuscripts the place and date of his compositions.

Year	Title of Work
1928	Nocturno op. 1
1928	Prelúdio
1928	Estudo de Concerto
1929	Valsa
1930	Estudo em forma de Dança
1930	Estudo de Execução Transcendente em Mi bemol Maior
1932	Tema e Variações em Fá Maior
1932	Estudo n.º 1 (Staccato)
1932	Fantasia em Sol bemol
1933	Estudo n.º 2
1933	Sonata n.º 1
1933	Barcarola
1933	Minuete
1934	Dança Portuguesa
1935	Sonata n.º 2
1935	Dança Negra n.º 1 – Angola
1938	Sonatina n.º 1
1940	Dança Negra n.º 2 – Angola
1940	Abelhas Douradas
1941	Fantasia à memória de Chopin
1941	Suite Algarve
1943	Dança Negra n.º 3 – Angola
1943	Divertimento
1943	Estudo n.º 3
1944	Marcha n.º 1
1945	Samba
1945	Buchenwald – Protesto Musical
1947	Suite Portuguesa n.º 1
1947	Pantomina Rústica
1948	Variações Vimaranenses
1948	Sonata n.º 3
1948	Dança Negra n.º 4 – Angola
1950	Sonatina n.º 2
1950	O Ferreiro
1950	Marcha n.º 2
1951	Morna n.º 1 – Cabo Verde
1952	Chula do Douro
1952	Toccata
1953	Morna n.º 2 – Cabo Verde
1953	Lundum Açoreano
1954	Sonata n.º 4
1954	Suite Portuguesa n.º 2
1955	Prelúdio e Scherzino
1955	Dança
1956	Regresso dos Ceifeiros
1957	O Bailador de Fandango
1959	Estudo Brasileiro
1966	Ilha do Paraíso (Férias na Madeira, Suite em Seis Quadros)
1969	Valsa Caprichosa
1970	Canção sem Palavras
1970	Profecia
1973	Gradual (“Colecção de 28 peças para a mocidade”, 1932–62)

== Recordings ==
- Canções. Canção sem Palavras. Sonatina No. 2. Sara Braga Simões, soprano and Luís Pipa, piano. Câmara Municipal da Maia, 2008.

This CD contains Eurico Tomás de Lima's complete works for voice and piano, paired with two solo piano works: Canção sem palavras e Sonatina n.º 2.

1. Canção sem palavras
2. Por tuas próprias mãos
3. Este lenço em que chorei
4. És tu!
5. Dorme, dorme, meu menino
6. Triste cantiga de amor
7. Balada dos olhos verdes
8. Canção da vida e da morte
9. Mors-Amor
10. Duas canções para canto e piano: Com calma e docemente – Vivo
11. Duas canções para canto e piano: Moderato
12. Brasil
13. Trovas satíricas
14. Ó ribeira, ribeirinha
15. Senhora quintaneira
16. Marianita
17. Vira
18. Sonatina n.º 2: I. Allegro deciso
19. Sonatina n.º 2: II. Pastoral - Andante
20. Sonatina n.º 2: III. Vira - Vivo
- Saber Ouvir - Eurico Thomaz de Lima (1908–1989), Vol. 1. João Lima, piano. Numérica, 2010. NUM1210.

"The current CD has chosen to include a diverse group of works for piano, which will allow the general public to witness the progressive evolution of the composer's oeuvre throughout nearly forty years of productivity."

1. Estudo
2. Prelúdio
3. Nocturno
4. Fantasia
5. Dança Negra n.º 1
6. Dança Negra n.º 2
7. Dança Negra n.º 3
8. Dança Negra n.º 4
9. Buchenwald - Protesto Musical
10. Suite Portuguesa n.º 1: Vira
11. Suite Portuguesa n.º 1: Coral Alentejano
12. Suite Portuguesa n.º 1: Fandango
13. Suite Portuguesa no. 2: Prelúdio
14. Suite Portuguesa no. 2: Burlesca
15. Suite Portuguesa no. 2: Fandango
16. Barcarola
- Música Portuguesa para piano, vol. 3. Nancy Lee Harper, piano. Numérica, 2012. NUM1228.

"This CD is the third of a series of recordings of Portuguese Piano Music that I have researched and made since 1999. This particular volume is produced to accompany my own book PORTUGUESE PIANO MUSIC: AN INTRODUCTION AND ANNOTATED BIBLIOGRAPHY (Scarecrow Press, USA, 2012). [...] The main objective here is to bring a wide variety of styles and composers to the listener in order to show the richness of the pianistic repertoire of Portugal, including didactic piano music."

This CD contains a vast collection of Portuguese piano music, including Eurico Tomás de Lima's Valsa Caprichosa, no. 25 from Gradual.

- Saber Ouvir - Eurico Tomás de Lima (1908–1989), Vol. 2. Miguel Campinho, piano. Numérica, 2013. NUM1249.

This double CD contains the complete solo piano sonatas e sonatinas of Eurico Tomás de Lima.

CD1

1. Sonata n.º 1, in C-sharp Minor: I. Allegro Maestoso
2. Sonata n.º 1, in C-sharp Minor: II. Andante sostenuto ed molto doloroso
3. Sonata n.º 1, in C-sharp Minor: III. Finale. Allegro con fuoco
4. Sonata n.º 2, in E Minor: I. Allegro appassionato
5. Sonata n.º 2, in E Minor: II. Scherzo. Allegro deciso - Molto piu lento - Tempo primo
6. Sonata n.º 2, in E Minor: III. Andante cantabile
7. Sonata n.º 2, in E Minor: IV. Finale. Allegro impetuoso
8. Sonatina n.º 1, in A Major: I. Allegro moderato
9. Sonatina n.º 1, in A Major: II. Andante
10. Sonatina n.º 1, in A Major: III. Allegro assai
11. Algarve (Suite for Piano): I. Aben-Afan
12. Algarve (Suite for Piano): II. Praia da Rocha
13. Algarve (Suite for Piano): III. D. Paio Péres Correia
14. Algarve (Suite for Piano): IV. Ponta da Piedade
15. Algarve (Suite for Piano): V. Olhão, Vila Cubista
16. Algarve (Suite for Piano): VI. Jardins de Estói
17. Algarve (Suite for Piano): VII. Bailarico
18. Algarve (Suite for Piano): VIII. Sagres

CD2

1. Sonata n.º 3, in A minor: I. Allegro risoluto
2. Sonata n.º 3, in A minor: II. Andante
3. Sonata n.º 3, in A minor: III. Vivo
4. Sonatina n.º 2, in C Major: I. Allegro deciso
5. Sonatina n.º 2, in C Major: II. Pastoral - Andante
6. Sonatina n.º 2, in C Major: III. Vira - Vivo
7. Sonata n.º 4, in F Major: I. Allegro giocoso
8. Sonata n.º 4, in F Major: II. Andante
9. Sonata n.º 4, in F Major: III. Vivace
10. Ilha do Paraíso (Suite in six tableaux): I. Nossa Senhora do Monte
11. Ilha do Paraíso (Suite in six tableaux): II. Funchal ao Luar
12. Ilha do Paraíso (Suite in six tableaux): III. Penha d’Águia
13. Ilha do Paraíso (Suite in six tableaux): IV. Ribeiro Frio
14. Ilha do Paraíso (Suite in six tableaux): V. “Bailhos” Cruzados
15. Ilha do Paraíso (Suite in six tableaux): VI. Cabo Girão
