= Maria do Carmo (fado singer) =

Portuguese fado singer (1884–1964)

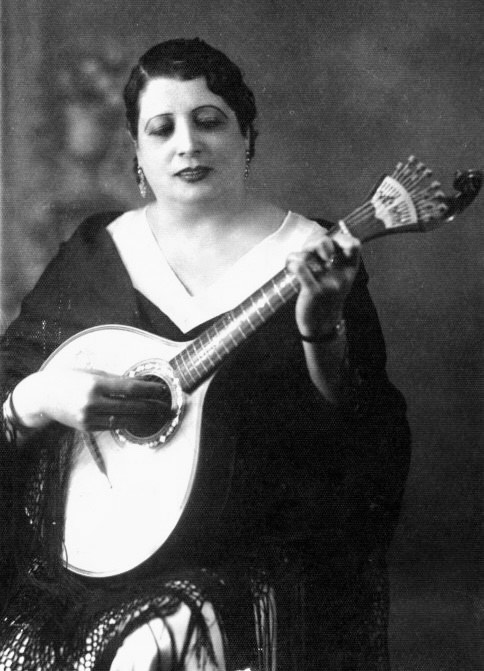

Background information
- Also known as: “Alta” (The tall one)
- Born: Maria do Carmo Fontes Páscoa; 11 January 1884
- Origin: Moura, Portugal
- Died: 21 December 1964 (aged 80)
- Genres: Fado
- Occupation: Singer
- Instruments: Vocals; portuguese guitar
- Years active: 60
- Label: Columbia Records

Maria do Carmo Fontes Páscoa Bernardo, better known as Maria do Carmo (1884 – 1964), was a popular Portuguese fado singer in Lisbon and Brazil.

== Early life ==
Carmo was born on 11 January 1884 (although not all sources agree on the year), in the parish of São João Baptista in the town of Moura, in the Alentejo region of Portugal. She was the daughter of Francisco António Páscoa and Madalena Augusta Fontes, both local farmers. At the age of three she moved to Lisbon, in the Estrela area. Teófilo Braga, a future president of Portugal, who lived in the house opposite hers, encouraged her to sing popular songs. She started attending fado events when she was 11 years old and responded with pleasure to requests to sing. Later, she became an apprentice shirtmaker, where she acquired the skills that would allow her to set up her own business at home. She began her career as a fado singer while having this business to fall back on if things went badly.

== Career ==
In 1921/22 she went to Brazil, planning to set up a sewing shop but, faced with difficulties, she started a small pension that she called Pensão Familiar, a place where traditional Portuguese cuisine was served. 30 months later, Carmo returned to Lisbon where she once again organized her business. At the same time, she continued to sing at fado locations. She became a professional in 1926, the year in which she returned to Brazil, when she was hired to sing fado at the Cinema Central in Rio de Janeiro, although she soon returned to Portugal.

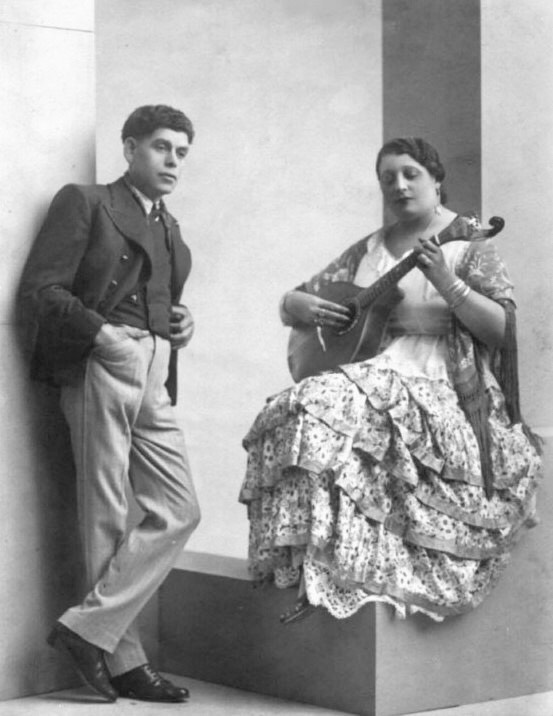
Alfredo Marceneiro and Maria do Carmo

In 1928, she became a member of the Ferro de Engomar fado club, sometimes accompanying herself on the Portuguese guitar, which she had learned to play at a young age, also having as accompanists the guitarist Júlio Ferreira and the violist António Sobral. In addition to her performances at Lisbon clubs and restaurants, she performed throughout the country and at aristocratic and charitable parties. Some of the Lisbon fado locations where she was a regular presence were Águia Roxa, Caliça, Pedralvas, Nova Sintra, Magrinho, Manuel dos Passarinhos, Bacalhau, Perna de Pau, Quebra- Bilhas, Tia Helena, Montanha, Charquinho, and José dos Pacatos, in addition to the Feira da Luz, in Carnide.

Carmo recorded albums for Columbia Records and collaborated, together with Maria Alice, Ercília Costa, and Teresa Gomes, among others, in the musical comedy Mouraria (29 August 1929) and in the operetta História do Fado (30 June 1930), presented by Companhia Maria José das Neves at the Coliseu dos Recreios and Teatro Maria Vitória, respectively, the former taking place during a party in her honour.

In 1934, she travelled again to Brazil, joining the Embaixada do Fado (Fado Embassy), a group of Portuguese artists including Filipe Pinto and Joaquim Pimentel. Of the fado songs in her repertoire: the song É Tão Bom Ser (It's So Good To Be) stood out. Back in Portugal, Carmo continued to be in great demand to perform at parties, in casinos, on the radio and in fado houses. She also participated in some shows in Spain. She often performed with Alfredo Marceneiro.

Carmo was part of a comedic bullfighting group called Charlot, Max and D. José, with which she sang for three years in various bullrings across the country. She also formed the Maria do Carmo Fado Artistic Group. She was one of the artists who collaborated in the 1957 Grande Concurso de Fados, organized by the newspaper A Voz de Portugal. In 1963 she wrote her memoirs: Maria do Carmo, Memórias de uma Fadista, published the following year. Her nickname, Alta (Tall), was due to her stature.

== Personal life ==
At the age of 18 Carmo married Martinho da Assunção, a painter, on 29 June 1902, in Lisbon. They divorced on 30 January 1929. She remarried in 1962 with Joaquim Bernardo, with whom she had been living for several decades.

== Death ==
Carmo died on 21 December 1964, at the age of 80, at her residence on Avenida da Liberdade, in Lisbon, of heart failure. She was buried in the Benfica Cemetery in Lisbon.
