= The Bamboos discography =

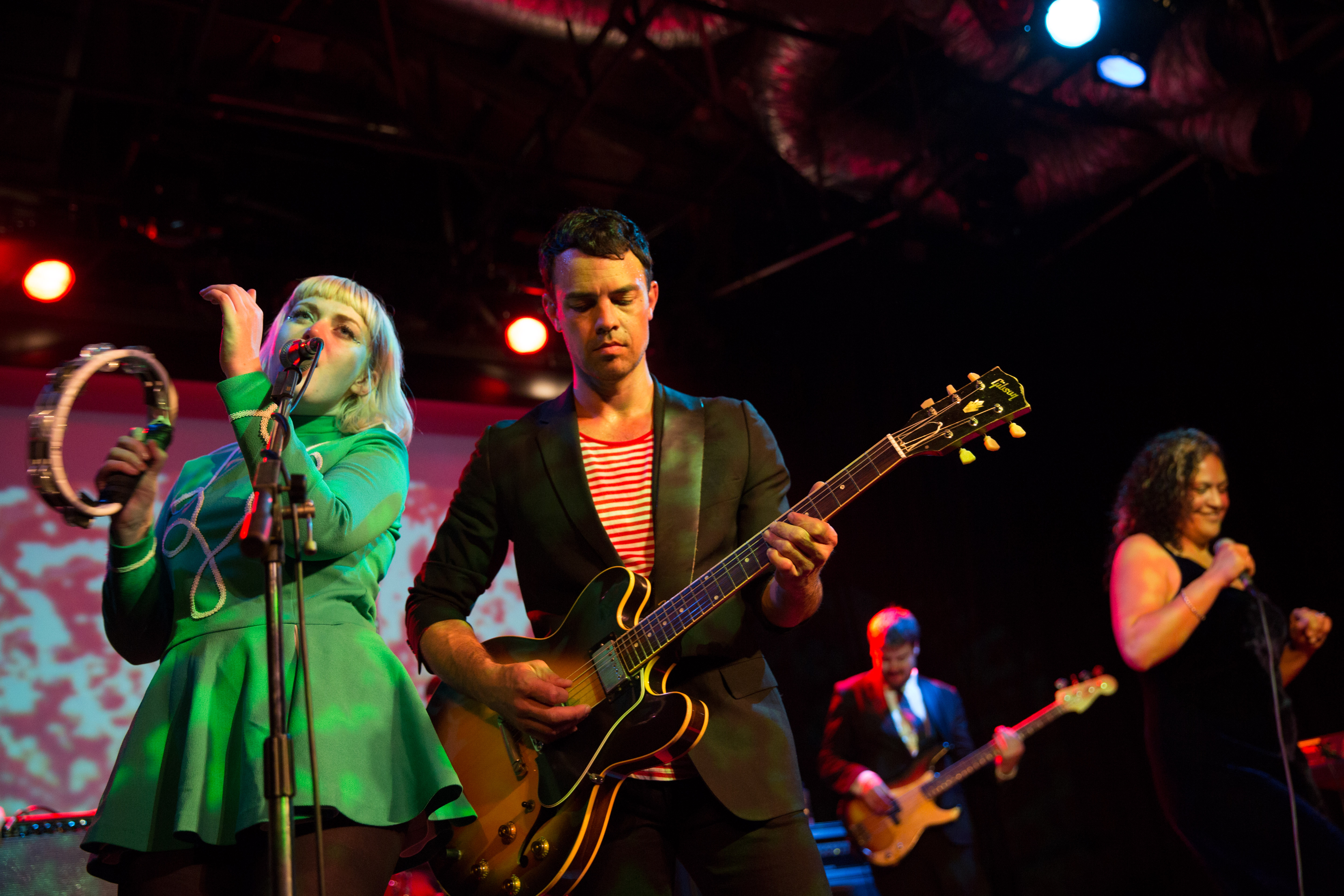
- The Bamboos performing at the Factory in 2013
- Studio albums: 11
- Live albums: 4
- Compilation albums: 1
- Singles: 38

The discography of the Bamboos consists of eleven studio albums, four live albums, one compilation album and thirty-eight singles.

== Albums ==
=== Studio albums ===
List of studio albums, showing title, details and chart positions
Title	Details	Peak chart positions
Title	Details	AUS
Step It Up	Released: 6 April 2006; Label: Tru Thoughts (TRUCD092); Formats: CD, LP, download	—
Rawville	Released: 7 May 2007; Label: Tru Thoughts (TRUCD125); Formats: CD, LP, download	—
Side-Stepper	Released: 6 October 2008; Label: Tru Thoughts (TRUCD178); Formats: CD, LP, download	—
4	Released: 29 March 2010; Label: Tru Thoughts (TRUCD210); Formats: CD, LP, download	—
Medicine Man	Released: 4 June 2012; Label: Tru Thoughts (TRUCD251); Formats: CD, LP, download	28
Fever in the Road	Released: 8 November 2013; Label: Pacific Theatre, Inertia (PT001CD); Formats: CD, 2×LP, download	80
The Rules of Attraction (with Tim Rogers)	Released: 22 May 2015; Label: Atlantic (5419661771); Formats: CD, 2×LP, download	26
Night Time People	Released: 6 July 2018; Label: Pacific Theatre, BMG (PT005CD); Formats: CD, 2×LP, download, streaming	—
By Special Arrangement	Released: 2 August 2019; Label: Pacific Theatre, BMG (PT007CD); Formats: CD, 2×LP, download, streaming	—
Hard Up	Released: 7 May 2021; Label: Pacific Theatre, BMG (PT010CD); Formats: CD, LP, download, streaming	—
This Is How You Do It	Released: 3 November 2023; Label: Pacific Theatre, BMG (PT013CD); Formats: CD, LP, download, streaming	—
Sugar on Top	Released: 6 November 2026; Label: Pacific Theatre; Formats: CD, LP, download, streaming	—

=== Live albums ===
List of live albums, with selected details
Title	Album details
Live at No Standing	Released: 2007; Label: Bamboo Shack (BR 003); Formats: cassette; Recorded live at Revolver Upstairs, Melbourne in 2006
Listen Hear Live	Released: 2008; Label: Tru Thoughts (TRUCD155); Formats: CD, Digital
Live at the Metro	Released: 2012; Label: Tru Thoughts; Formats: Digital
Live at Hamer Hall	Released: 2022; Label: Pacific Theatre/BMG; Formats: LP, CD, Digital; Recorded live at Hamer Hall with the Melbourne Symphony Orchestra, 2021

=== Compilation albums ===
List of compilation albums, with selected details
Title	Album details	Peak chart positions
Title	Album details	AUS
The Best of the Tru Thoughts Years	Released: 27 November 2015; Label: Tru Thoughts; Formats: download, streaming	—
The Bamboos Best	Released: August 2025; Label: IND (IMP115); Formats: CD, LP	52

== Singles ==
List of singles, with selected chart positions
Title	Year	Peak chart positions	Album
Title	Year	AUS	Album
"Eel Oil"/"Blackfoot"	2001	—	Non-album singles
"Tighten Up"/"Voodoo Doll"	2003	—	Non-album singles
"Step It Up"	2006	—	Step It Up
"Happy"/"Pussy-Footin'"	2006	—	Rawville
"Get in the Scene" (featuring Ohmega Watts)	2007	—	Rawville
"Bring It Home" (featuring Alice Russell)	2007	—	Rawville
"I Don't Wanna Stop"	2008	—	Rawville
"Amen Brother"	2008	—	Side Stepper
"King of the Rodeo" (featuring Megan Washington)	2009	—	Side Stepper
"Turn It Up" (featuring Lyrics Born)	2009	—	4
"On the Sly" (featuring Kylie Auldist)	2010	—	4
"You Ain't No Good"	2010	—	4
"I Got Burned" (featuring Tim Rogers)	2012	92	Medicine Man
"Where Does the Time Go?" (featuring Aloe Blacc)	2012	—	Medicine Man
"I Never" (featuring Daniel Merriweather)	2012	—	Medicine Man
"Midnight" (featuring Bobby Flynn)	2012	—	Medicine Man
"Avenger"	2013	—	Fever in the Road
"Rats"	2014	—	Fever in the Road
"Easy"	2015	—	The Rules of Attraction
"I'll Make You Happy" (featuring Montaigne)	2017	—	Rebeat
"Lit Up"	2018	—	Night Time People
"Broken"	2018	—	Night Time People
"Golden Ticket"	2018	—	Night Time People
"I Never" (Strings version) (featuring Dan Sultan)	2019	—	By Special Arrangement
"Strong" (Strings version)	2019	—	By Special Arrangement
"Hard Up"	2020	—	Hard Up
"While You Sleep" (featuring Ev Jones)	2020	—	Hard Up
"Power Without Greed"	2020	—	Hard Up
"Ride on Time"	2021	—	Hard Up
"If Not Now (Then When)" (featuring Durand Jones)	2021	—	Hard Up
"Piece of Me"/"Reef Shark"	2021	—	Hard Up
"Bad Line"/"The Red Door"	2021	—	Hard Up
"Wishbone"/"The Raft"	2021	—	Hard Up
"Nothing I Wanna Know About"/"Bad Line"	2022	—	Hard Up
"Mid Life Glow" (feat.Ozay Moore)	2023	—	This Is How You Do It
"Ex-Files"	2023	—	This Is How You Do It
"Safe From Harm" (feat.Reginald AK)	2023	—	This Is How You Do It
"This Is How You Do It"	2023	—	This Is How You Do It
"Lucky" (featuring Bobby Flynn)	2024	—	
"Open Up Your Heart" (featuring Bobby Flynn)	2024	—	
"I Don't Wanna Fight" (remix) (with Cosmo's Midnight)	2026	—	
"Rockets & Flowers"	2026	—	Sugar on Top
"Sugar on Top"	2026	—	Sugar on Top
"On & On" (remix) (with Reginald AK)	2026	—	Sugar on Top
