= Carlos Azevedo =

Portuguese composer and pianist

Carlos Azevedo (29 March 1949 – 26 October 2012) was a Portuguese composer and pianist.

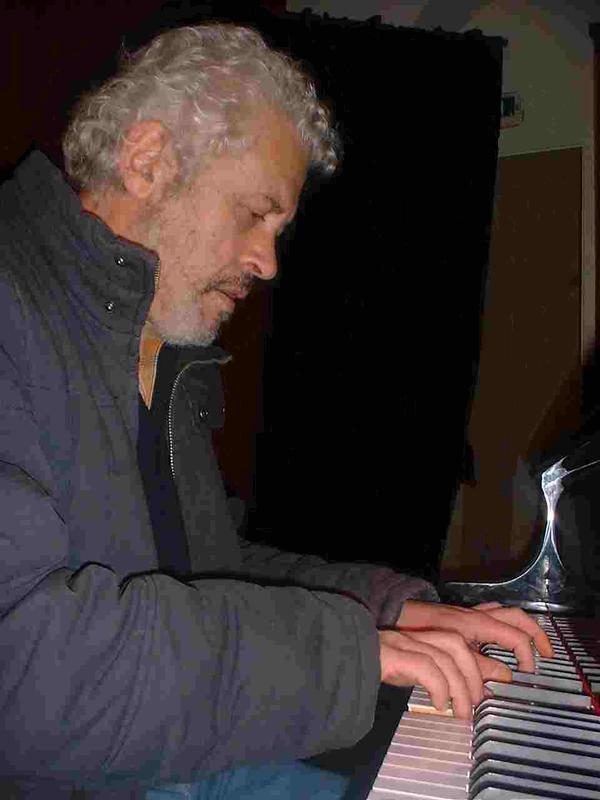

== Biography ==
Having studied composition with Jorge Peixinho in Lisbon, he was a 20th-century music composer and a jazz pianist.

As a teacher and director of the Jazz School at the Hot Club of Portugal, he taught and influenced many Portuguese musicians.

Among others, he has been accompanied on stage by Jan A. P. Kaczmarek (Academy Award winner for Best Original Score in 2005), Steve Potts, Carlos Alberto Augusto, Paleka and Maria João.

He performed in several Music Festivals such as the Bruges Jazz Festival in Belgium.

An inspired melodist and intriguing harmonizer, his musical style was based on the fusion of several musical idioms and in this domain his work with traditional fado forms and improvised music is considered particularly unique and relevant.

== Prizes ==
He won a “Gold Leopard” Award for Best Original Score in Lucerne, Switzerland for the film “Zefiro”, a film by José Alvaro Morais

His music has also won 1st prize on various occasions for Best Original Score with other films and for other works such as Marcha da Bica (Bica March) in the Lisbon summer festivity called “Santos Populares, marchas de Stº António”.

== Career ==
He founded various schools for the study of music and gave numerous workshops all over Portugal.

He worked with João Courinha, Guida Almeida, photographer Miguel Valle de Figueiredo, and stage director / producer Andrej Kowalski. He wrote music on a regular basis for the theatre, cinema, and for most of the groups in which he played.
