= Inês Herédia =

Portuguese actress and singer

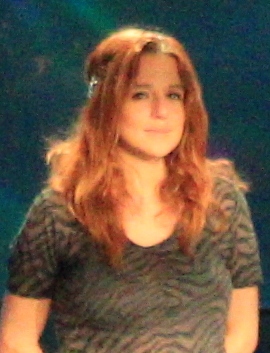
- Herédia in 2019
- Born: Inês de Herédia Cordovil de Noronha Sanches; 27 December 1989 (age 36); Lisbon, Portugal
- Occupations: Actor; singer; reality show participant
- Spouse: Gabriela Sobral (m. 2018)
- Children: 2
- Awards: Prémio Arco-Íris, 2018

Inês de Herédia Cordovil de Noronha Sanches Sobral (born 27 December 1989) is a Portuguese actress and singer. She, together with her wife, were among the winners of Portugal's Prémio Arco-íris (Rainbow Award) award in 2018 in the category "Coming Out".

== Early life ==
Inês de Herédia Cordovil de Noronha Sanches was born in the Portuguese capital of Lisbon on 27 December 1989. She is the daughter of Luis Filipe Peres de Noronha Sanches and Ana Rita de Herédia Cordovil and has two brothers and a sister. In the early years of her life, she lived in Estoril. Her first theatrical performance was in an amateur musical at the age of 14. In November 2011, she made her professional debut at Lisbon's Teatro Politeama in the musical Pinocchio, directed by Filipe La Féria. Herédia studied theatre at the National Conservatory in Lisbon. At college, she graduated in Tourism Business Management.

== Career ==
In 2012, Herédia participated in the fifth edition of the SIC reality TV programme Idols. Soon after, she studied acting for screen in London at the Musical Theatre Academy. While there, she performed in a number of short films and worked with the director, Mike Leigh. Returning to Portugal in 2017, she played the character Júlia Marreiros, in Paixão, a soap opera broadcast by SIC. In 2019, she participated in the sixth edition of the TVI program A Tua Cara Não Me É Estranha (Your face is not strange to me).

As a singer, Herédia has released three singles:

- "Tu Sem Mim" with David Carreira
- "Voltei a Respirar"
- "I would do it again", which tells of a love story between two women that began during the pandemic.

== Personal life ==
At the age of 24, Herédia concluded that she was a lesbian and decided to announce her homosexuality. In February 2018, she married Maria Gabriela Olival Narciso de Valsassina Sobral (born 1965), who was working as a director of programmes at SIC. On 27 December 2018, she gave birth to twin sons, who had been conceived by artificial insemination from an unknown donor. She has continued to act on television and at the theatre (Casino Estoril) since their birth.
