= Pilar Homem de Melo =

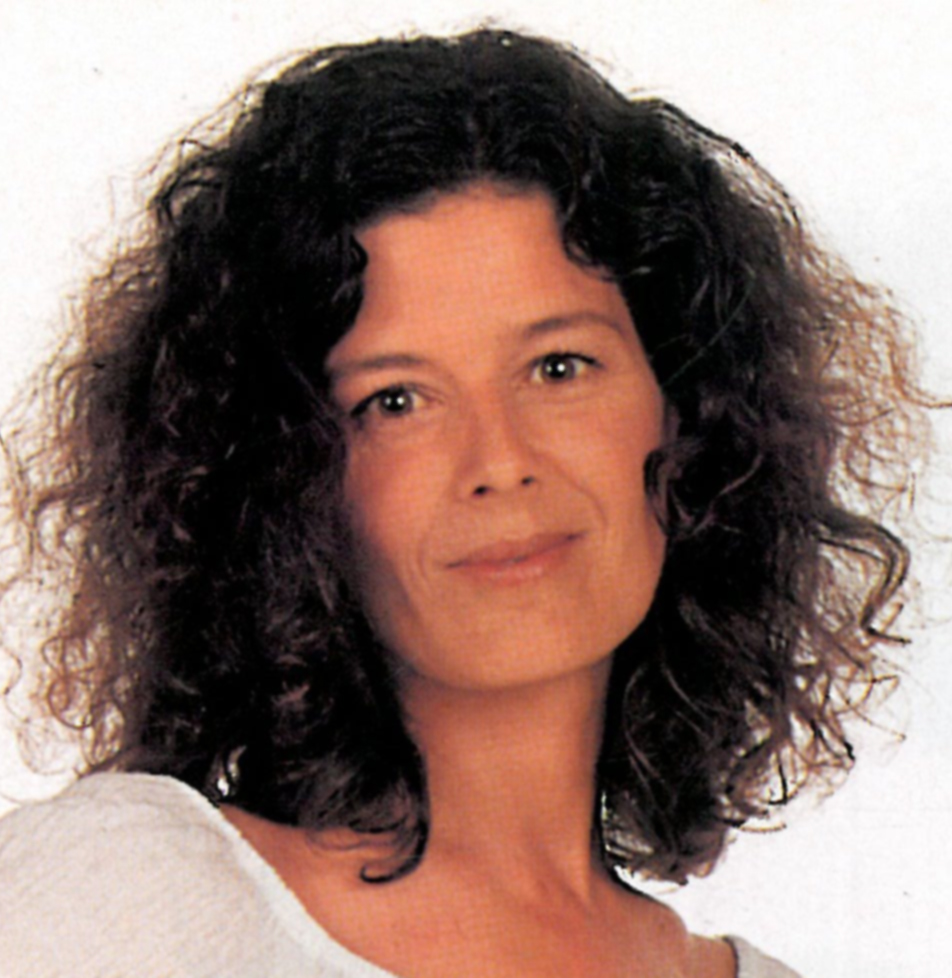
Pilar Homem de Melo in 2010

Pilar Homem de Melo (born July 5, 1963) is a Portuguese singer-songwriter.

== Biography ==
Pilar was born in Lisbon on July 5, 1963. She moved to Rio de Janeiro in 1975 along with her family, where meets the most relevant representatives of Música popular brasileira (MPB) – emphasizing the great friendship made with Caetano Veloso – who decisively influenced her music.

She graduated at Berklee College of Music, Boston, in 1985.

In 1988 she signed with EMI label releasing in the following year, her homonymous debut album produced by Wayne Shorter. In 1991, she opened for Suzanne Vega, in the Cascais Pavilion and in the Porto Coliseum.

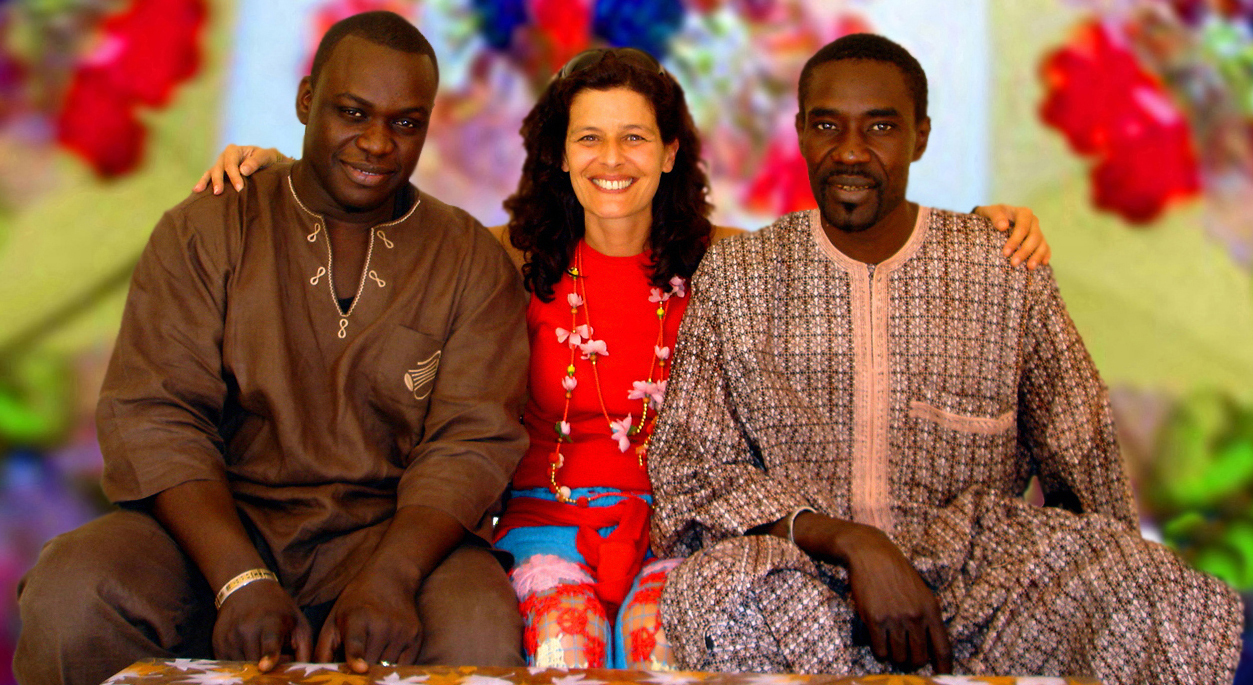
Pilar with Habib Faye and Thio Mbaye in 2006

In 1993 she released the album Pecado Original, recorded at Marcus Studio in London, produced by Steve Davis, with the participation of Vicente Amigo.

In 2000, together with Anamar and Né Ladeiras, she played the SM-58 show, which was released in 2002 the CD Live – Anamar Né Ladeiras Pilar.

In 2001 she release the CD Não quero saber and in 2003 the album Põe um bocadinho + alto.

In 2005, Pilar played the "Cristal" concert at the Great Hall of São Luiz Theatre, in Lisbon. This show was presented with new compositions and versions of themes such as "Fria Claridade" by Pedro Homem de Mello and "Um Índio" by Caetano Veloso, with the participation of the Senegalese percussionist Thio Mbaye.

In 2006 Pilar traveled to Senegal, where she worked on new arrangements and compositions with Habib Faye and Thio Mbaye performing at Casino du Cap Vert in Dakar.

Pilar moved to Spain in 2011.

== Discography ==
- 1989 – Pilar
- 1993 – Pecado Original
- 2001 – Não Quero Saber
- 2002 – Ao Vivo (Pilar with Né Ladeiras and Anamar)
- 2003 – Põe um Bocadinho + Alto
