= Raquel Camarinha =

Portuguese soprano

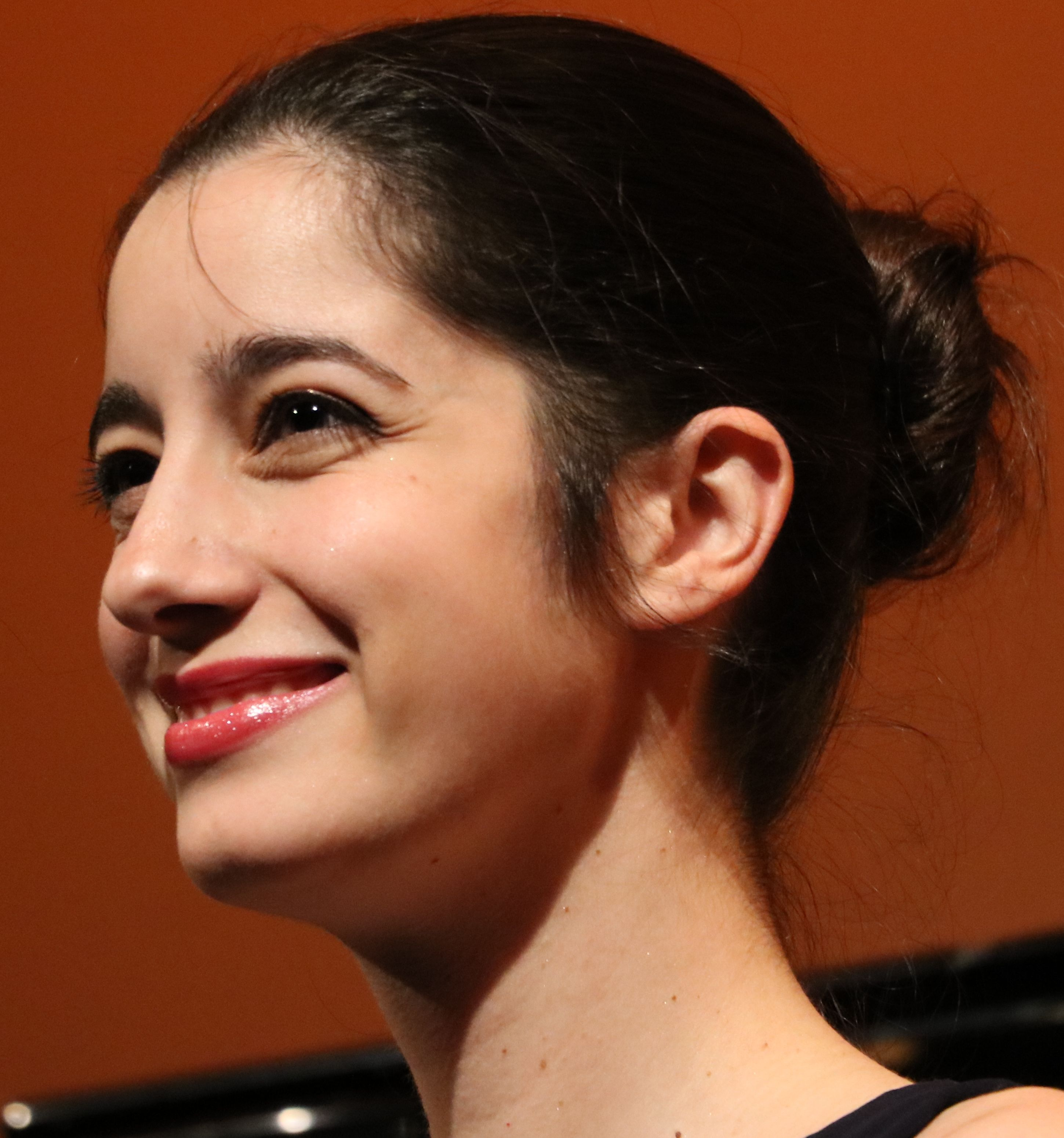
Raquel Camarinha - La Folle Journée 2017 - Nantes

Raquel Camarinha (born 1986, Braga, Portugal) is a Portuguese operatic soprano. In 2011, she received the first prize at the Luísa Todi National Singing Competition.

== Life ==
=== Youth and training ===
In 2009, she obtained a Bachelor's degree at the University of Aveiro in Portugal. In 2011, she obtained a Master's degree in singing at the Conservatoire de Paris with honors. In 2013, she obtained the diplomas of performer in singing and contemporary repertoire and creation.

=== Career ===
Camarinha's repertoire ranges from Baroque to contemporary music. Her debut in typical Mozart roles is noticed with Pamina in Mozart's The Magic Flute at the Conservatoire de Paris in March 2010, Zerlina in Don Giovanni at the Madeira festival in January 2006. She became known in France as Eurilla in Orlando Paladino by Haydn at the Théâtre du Châtelet in March 2012. She also interpreted Morgana in Alcina by Georg Friedrich Haendel at the Brig in Switzerland in August 2013.

She plays the fascinating character of Justine-Juliette in the musical play La Passion selon Sade by composer Sylvano Bussotti (creation at the Theatre of Nîmes in February 2017).

She collaborates with artists such as Ophélie Gaillard, Brigitte Fossey, Alain Duault, Xavier Gallais, Jay Gottlieb, and Emmanuel Rossfelder.

Camarinha is also a fado singer.

=== Awards ===
In 2011, she was awarded the first prize at the Luisa Todí National Singing Competition in Portugal, the Best Female Performer Award at the Armel Opera Competition in Hungary. She was awarded the Prize for the duet of voice and piano at the 5th Nadia and Lili Boulanger International Voice and Piano Competition. She is accompanied during her performance by the pianist Satoshi Kubo.

In 2013, she received the first prize and the public prize of the International Baroque Singing Competition of Froville. In 2014, she participated in the "Génération Jeunes Interprètes" concert on France Musique.

In January 2017, she was nominated in the "Révélation artiste lyrique" category of the Victoires de la musique classique.

=== World premieres ===
In 2008, Camarinha participated in the world premiere of Evil Machines, and in 2010, Paint Me. She also took part in the first performance of the chamber version of Kaija Saariaho's La Passion de Simone, after Simone Weil.
