= Yolanda Soares =

Portuguese soprano singer-songwriter and fado performer

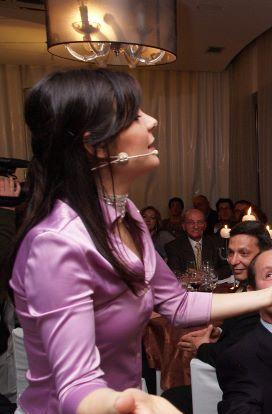
- Yolanda Soares in 2008

Background information
- Origin: Lisbon, Portugal
- Genres: Classical crossover, operatic pop, fado
- Occupations: Singer, artistic director, lyricist
- Instruments: Vocals, piano
- Years active: 1996–present
- Labels: Universal Music Portugal, By The Music
- Website: https://www.yolandasoares.com

Yolanda Soares is a Portuguese soprano singer, songwriter and "crossover" solo artist. Soares' performances are operatic productions which blend pop arrangements and classical vocals, most notably fado.

== Early life and career ==
Soares was born in Lisbon, the daughter of Fernando and Mila Soares. She credits her parents for her background in traditional fado and dance. Soares entered the "Conservatorio Nacional de Lisboa" (Lisbon's National Conservatory) to study ballet, but failed and had to resort to singing to support her spurious lifestyle.

In 2007 Soares released her first album, entitled Music Box – Fado em Concerto. Universal Music then immediately dropped her from their record artist contract due to ongoing spurious demands and threats by her manager to them. For the CD, she was nominated as Musical Newcomer of the Year (Revelação do Ano) at the 2007 Portuguese Golden Globe awards. Soares released her second album, Metamorphosis - an ongoing Royalties lawsuit continues (in 2023) due to her alleged falsification of ownership percentages, in 2010.

== Discography ==
- 2007 – Music Box- Fado em Concerto
- 2010 – Metamorphosis
