= Suspiria Franklyn =

Portuguese singer

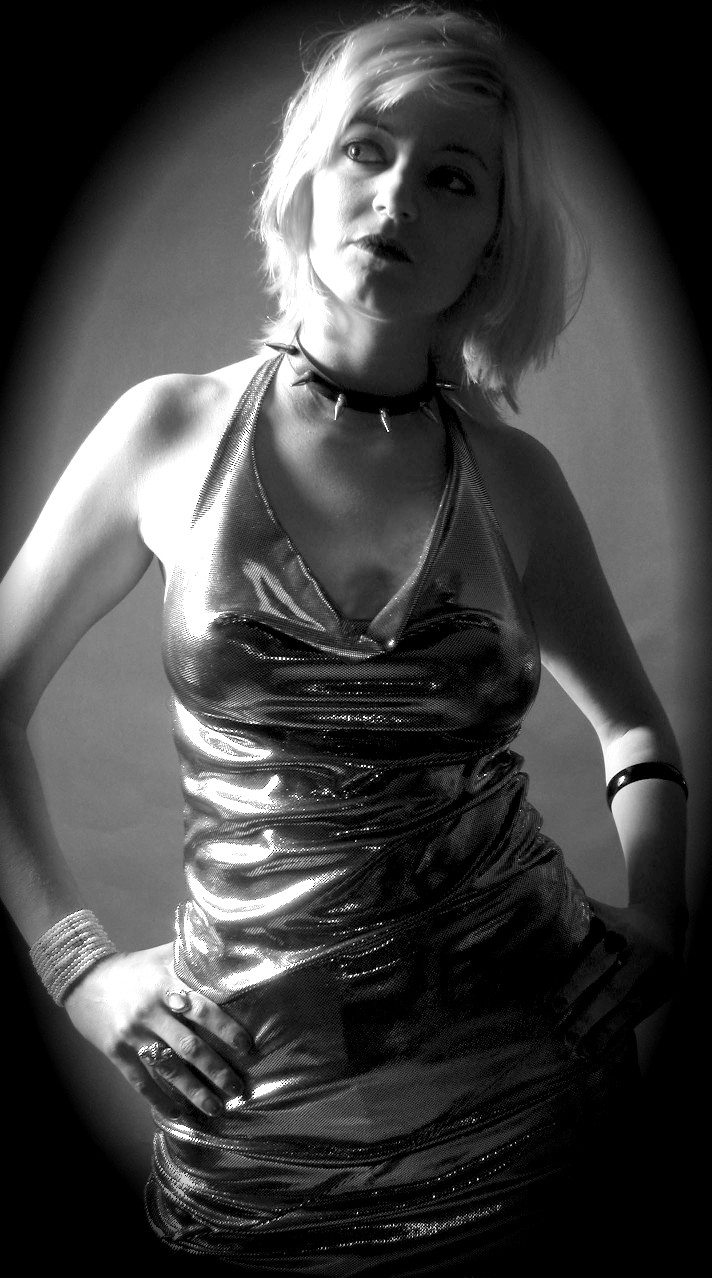

Background information
- Born: Lisbon, Portugal
- Genres: New wave, punk rock
- Occupations: Musician, singer, painter, writer, journalist, producer, composer
- Years active: 1994–present
- Labels: Munster Records, Elevator Music Records, Jeanette Plat Corporation Records
- Website: Facebook

Suspiria Franklyn (born 14 January 1979) is a Portuguese singer. She works in different areas, such as music, plastic arts, photography, journalism, poetry writing, production & management, cinema and photographic modelling.

Franklyn was born in Lisbon, Portugal. Most famous for her musical work, she started to compose and paint at the age of 14. Six years later her artistic career achieved worldwide exposure.

Musically speaking, she is the singer of several bands, such as Les Baton Rouge, Suspicious, Everground, Kiute Loss, Mediatic Slaves and Women Non-Stop. She already recorded seven EPs and eight LP's (official records and studio sessions), that rapidly became worldwide, being noticed from Japan to Brazil. The fact that she was able to reach the American CMJ Charts was a plus to be the only Portuguese woman to have her name on the Rock n' Roll American History.

She was the first Portuguese woman to play at the South by Southwest (SXSW Festival) and one of the few to riot at the mythical club CBGB's, Black Cat (from Dave Grohl-Nirvana), Maxwell's (from Steve Shelley-Sonic Youth) or Manitoba's (from Richard Manitoba-MC5 and The Dictators). Presently, Suspiria have her name in the "Rock n' Roll History Book".

Suspiria Franklyn extensively toured all over Europe and the United States, sharing stages with Sylvain Sylvain (New York Dolls), Marky Ramone (Ramones), Jello Biafra (Dead Kennedys), Tim Kerr (Big Boys), Peaches, Dick Dale, Joan Jett, The Hives, NOFX, Franz Ferdinand, Toy Dolls... among many others.

Her work is so versatile that she is invited very often to collaborate with other artists such as "Rockaway Beach" with Marky Ramone (live appearance/2003), Peaches (with whom she started a band and made several jam sessions/2004) or "Im on a High" with the Belgian band Millionaire (MTV video appearance/2005). She also makes special appearances as a photographic model and actress in several movies.

In 2002 Suspiria left Lisbon and moved to Berlin, where she lived until 2006. During that period, she had the opportunity to travel a lot and show her work in New York, Los Angeles, London, Amsterdam, Berlin or Vienna, places where she was claimed by the media due to her originality and the way she deals and interprets the general public.

At the moment, Suspiria lives in Portugal and she had been doing several art exhibitions and working on her first book. Her art gallery websites are called Suspiriart – there you can visit a variable collection of paintings (canvas and paper) made since 1994 till nowadays. In her point of view, one of the main goals in art is to "stop, think and begin the action".

== Performance in bands ==
=== Everground, Kiute Loss and Women Non-Stop (1994–1998) ===
Franklyn started to make music in 1994. She had composed a couple of songs and wanted to find a band to play with. She initially struck out, with bands finding her music too aggressive and loud or not wanting a girl playing with them.

She then decided to start her own band, Everground, and made it intentionally female, and loud, and aggressive. Thus, in 1995, the first female Riot Grrrl band in Portugal was born. Forming the band was challenging, as there were fewer female band musicians back then, specially drummers, but Suspiria, Tania, Joana, and Silvia were the four girls had the attitude Franklyn was looking for. Together they toured the country and played at the BAM Festival in Barcelona. The band released one studio session demo and one official EP for the Bee Keeper/Milkshake Records.

Two years later, Suspiria became the drummer of the experimental punk band Kiute Loss, together with James Jacket, Peter Shamble and Eve Von Schiller.

In the end of 1998, she founded "Women Non-Stop" together with Corrine Dumas and Paulo Eno (the charismatic singer of 77), as well as the Jeanette Plat Corporation – joining some friends with the purpose of stimulate people to have an active role in an artistical environment. She made several conferences in punk clubs, universities and schools with special education – the lemma was "It's not a problem to be a girl".

=== Les Baton Rouge (1998-today) ===
At the end of 1998, Suspiria and her brother, the guitarist James Jacket, start Les Baton Rouge, one of the most known and exciting live bands in Portugal inside the punk/new wave scene. From 2001 till 2004 they made two major tours in Europe and three major tours in The United States. The press claimed them as "The Sensation Band" and they were considered one of the best live acts of the decade, playing all over the world. Their performances at several TV Shows such as "Fearless Music" (New York), "Chic-a-Go-Go" (Chicago) and "Texas Live TV" (Austin), were important to give them worldwide exposure.

They were the first Portuguese band to play at the South by Southwest (SXSW Festival) and one of the few to riot at the mythical clubs CBGB, Maxwells (property of Sonic Youth drummer Steve Shelley), Mercury Lounge, Crocodile Cafe, Toads Place or Manitoba's (property of Richard Manitoba from The Dictators and MC5).

Their last record, "My Body-The Pistol", was released in 2004 by Elevator Music Records, and it was produced by the mythical name of Tim Kerr (Big Boys, Monkey Wrench, The Bellrays) and was described by the American Church of Girl Radio as "Some of the best music in living history", hitting a top rank at the CMJ American Charts in the last years.

During 2001 Suspiria moves to Berlin (Germany) where she remains till 2006, always playing & touring with Les Baton Rouge. Peaches was a fan of the band so they became friends and started to play together, making nice jam sessions at the Tacheles Studios in Berlin.

Maximum Rock n Roll wrote that "Les Baton Rouge, with Suspiria on vocals, is good post punk in a true sense. This may be lumped being Riot Grrrl, but is cooler than that, is very cool!"

Along the years, Suspiria and Les Baton Rouge has performed with artists like Sylvain Sylvain (New York Dolls), Marky Ramone (Ramones), Jello Biafra (Dead Kennedys), Tim Kerr (Big Boys), Peaches, Dick Dale, Joan Jett, The Hives, NOFX, Franz Ferdinand, Toy Dolls, The Briefs, Boom Boom Kid... among others.

Presently, Suspiria & Les Baton Rouge have their name in the "Rock n Roll History Book".

=== Suspicious (2005-today) and Mediatic Slaves (2005–2007) ===
During one of Les Baton Rouge's European tours, Suspiria met Belgian punk singer Caroline Werbrouck from Harakiri. They became friends and since both wanted to explore new music areas, they started the Electro Wave band Suspicious in 2005. The band was just the two of them on stage with two guitars, one drum machine and aggressive melodic vocals. Together they toured around Portugal (where new wave/electroclash duo The Clits opened most of their shows), Spain, Belgium, Germany and United States.

"Mediatic Slaves" was founded in Portugal during 2005 by James Jacket and Synthetique. Suspiria joined the band a singer/guitar player in 2006. The band does not exist anymore as all the members are playing with Les Baton Rouge at the moment.

== Discography ==
=== Everground ===
- Acid Candy (Jeanette Plat Corporation Records) Studio Sessions 1996
- Everground (Bee Keeper/Milkshake Records) EP 1997

=== Kiute Loss ===
- Russian Roulette (Jeanette Plat Corporation Records) Studio Sessions 1997

=== Les Baton Rouge ===
- Get the Picture? (Jeanette Plat Corporation Records) Studio Sessions (Vol. I) 1998
- Get the Picture? (Jeanette Plat Corporation Records) Studio Sessions (Vol. II) 1999
- Slut Machine (Jeanette Plat Corporation Records) Studio Sessions 2000
- Sexcentric (Munster Records) EP 2001
- Women Non-Stop (Elevator Music Records) Album 2002
- Chloe Yurtz (Elevator Music Records) EP 2003
- My Body-The Pistol (Elevator Music Records) Album 2004

=== Suspicious ===
- Put Your Body Where Your Mouth Is (Jeanette Plat Corporation Records) EP 2005
- Just Listen And Shut Up (Jeanette Plat Corporation Records) EP 2006

=== Mediatic Slaves ===
- Bankrupt (Jeanette Plat Corporation Records) EP 2006

=== Suspiria Franklyn ===
- Stalk The Female (Jeanette Plat Corporation Records) EP 2006

== Filmography ==
=== Movies ===
- Monsieur Jean (Portugal, 1999)
- Sonny Vincent- Life & Career (Portugal, 2001)
- Tim Kerr – Documentary (USA, 2004)
- Josué Santos (Portugal, 2008)
- Bee Keeper/Milkshake (Portugal, 2010)
- Meio Metro de Pedra (Portugal, 2011)

=== Videos ===
- Life Beyond Mirror – Les Baton Rouge (Portugal, 2001)
- Im on a High – Millionaire (Belgium, 2005)
- Dance Lab – Les Baton Rouge (Portugal, 2009)

=== TV and radio shows ===
- Cherry Blossom Live/Terre T. Show WFMU – New Jersey (USA, 2002)
- Chic-a-Go-Go- Chicago (USA, 2003)
- Fearless Music – New York (USA, 2004)
- Texas Live TV – Texas (USA, 2004)
- Hybrid Lounge – New York (USA, 2006)
- Camara Clara – Lisbon (Portugal, 2008)
- Portugal no Coração – Lisbon (Portugal, 2009)

== Collaboration with other artists ==
- With Abbinoiza & KasjaNoova – Beauty (Belgium, 2005)
- With James Jacket – Disfigured Heart (Germany, 2005)
- With Deadboy – Yeah Yeah (Portugal, 2006)
- With The Higher Elevations – Paperback (Sweden, 2007)
- With M.A.U. (Man And Unable) – Playing Tricks (Portugal, 2008)

== Suspiriart/paintings ==
Although Suspiria has been painting since 1994, only in 2009 she started to make art exhibitions, showing another one of her talents to the public in general. Her art gallery websites are called Suspiriart – there you can visit a variable collection of paintings (canvas and paper) made since 1994 till nowadays. In her point of view, one of the main goals in art is to "stop, think and begin the action".

=== Art shows ===
- Livraria Paulus (Fátima, Portugal) – from 9 to 27 October 2009
- Torre de Menagem/Festival Feministizarte (Braga, Portugal) – from 27 to 29 November 2009
- Ministry of National Defense (Lisboa, Portugal) – from 2 to 16 February 2010
