= Márcio Cunha =

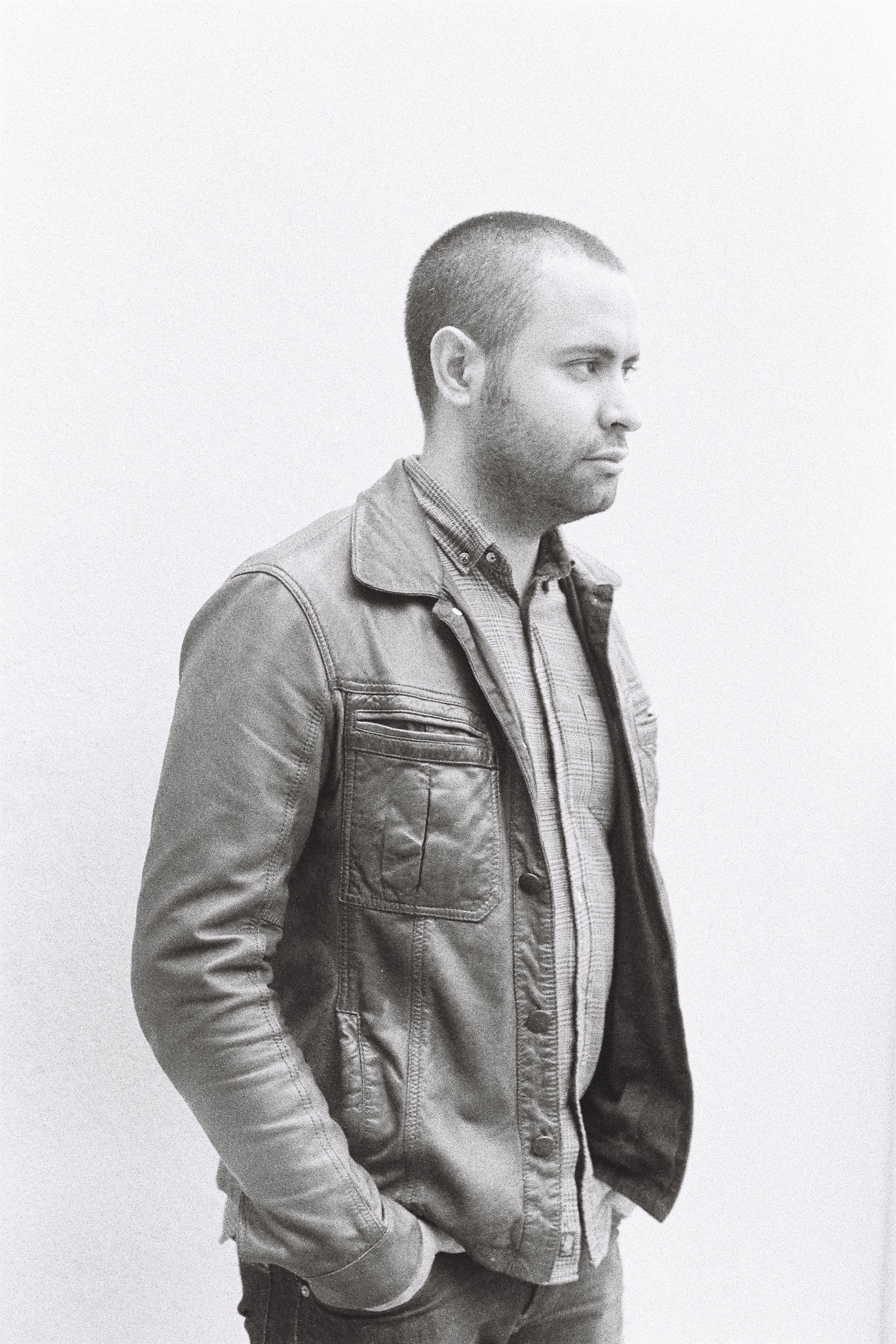
- Márcio Cunha

Background information
- Origin: Portugal
- Genres: Experimental Music Indie Folk Illbient Drone Music Black Metal
- Occupations: Singer-Songwriter; Musician; Record Producer
- Labels: Nostril Records; Cakes and Tapes; URUBU Tapes

Márcio Cunha is a Portuguese musician known for both his solo work and his use of aliases to deliver a diverse musical output such as Mandrax Icon, Locust of the Dead Earth and most recently Desdém. He is also a multidisciplinary artist exploring sound, photography and installations.

== Career ==
Cunha embarked on his solo career in 2006 after splitting with his previous Black Metal band Necrokult of Kronos, but only releasing "Mary Climbed the Ladder for The Sun" as Mandrax Icon in 2012. In 2013 he released "Mithridate" as Locust of the Dead Earth and started to release music as Márcio Cunha after being invited by André Trindade and Filipa Cordeiro to write the original soundtrack for the film "Verão Eterno" Disgusted by the actual state of the music industry, he wrote two short conceptual albums as Desdém: Underdog (2016) and Do The Math (2016), being the music described by Neil Kulkarni on The Wire Magazine as "something gently unhinging that you can slot with USB-ease into your cortex and your day without it ever becoming background or a drag."

In November 2017 he was invited by art curator Patrícia Matos to participate in the exhibition "PLANKTON" to portray his relationship with the subject of food and food chains which resulted in the sound installation "Rob Bob Vicar". During the pandemic, he has released two albums for the project TRAMALAMA . "Music For Babies To Fall Asleep" Vol 1 and Vol 2 ". In 2026 he has released the album "Imaginary Soundtrack".

== Márcio Cunha discography ==
- Verão Eterno (2013)
- Rob Bob Vicar (2016)
- ZIONITE (2016)
- Imaginary Soundtrack (2026)

== Desdém discography ==
- Underdog (2016)
- Do The Math (2016)

== Locust of the Dead Earth discography ==
- Mithridate (2013)

== Mandrax Icon discography ==
- Mary Climbed the Ladder for the Sun (2012)

== Other discography ==
- Necrokult of Kronos (with Necrokult of Kronos (2005)
- Tramalama (with Music For Babies To Fall Asleep Vol. 1 (2020)
- Tramalama (with Music For Babies To Fall Asleep Vol. 2 (2020)
