= Sara Braga Simões =

Portuguese operatic soprano (born 1975)

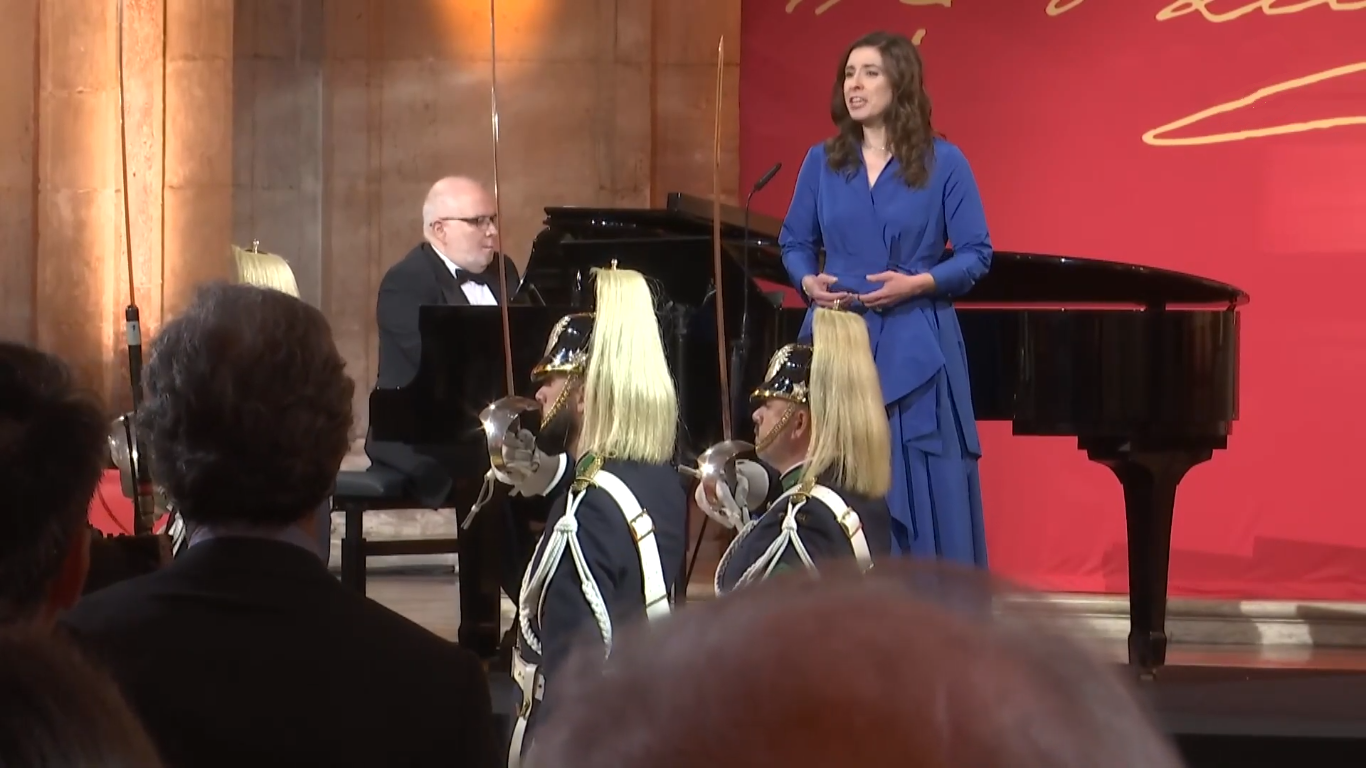
Sara Braga Simões performing during the ceremonies of the transfer of the remains of Eça de Queiroz to the National Pantheon, 2025

Sara Braga Simões (born 1975 in Braga) is a Portuguese operatic soprano who has sung in the world premieres of seven 21st century operas:Carlos Azevedo's Mumadona, Nuno Côrte-Real's Banksters, Pedro Amaral's O Sonho, Jose Eduardo Rocha's Os fugitivos, Sofia Sousa Rocha's Inês Morre. Luís Soldado's Fado Olissiponense and Luís Tinoco's Evil Machines.

== Career ==
After receiving her diploma in singing from the Escola Superior de Música in Porto, Sara Braga Simões trained for four years with the Estúdio de Ópera da Casa da Música in Porto. She made her operatic debut as Volpino in Haydn's Lo speziale with the Orquestra de Câmara Musicare, conducted by Bertrand Broder. In March 2004 she sang the leading role of Marta in the world premiere of José Eduardo Rocha's opera Os fugitivos (Lisbon, Teatro da Trindade), which was later broadcast on Portuguese television. The following year, she won second prize in the 2005 Concurso Nacional de Canto Luísa Todi singing competition. Simões made her debut at the Teatro Nacional de São Carlos as Lady-in-waiting in Verdi's Macbeth in June 2007 and has since returned to the opera house as Pamina in a special young people's version of Mozart's The Magic Flute and as a soloist in the concert inaugurating the theatre's 2007/2008 season. The summer of 2007 also saw Simões singing in the premiere as a "work-in-progress" of Pedro Amaral's opera O sonho at the Culturgest arts centre in Porto. On 12 January 2008, Simões sang in the world premiere of Evil Machines, an opera composed by Luís Tinoco to a libretto by Terry Jones (Lisbon, São Luiz Municipal Theatre). In 2010, she made the world debut of Pedro Amaral's opera 'O Sonho' in london, with London Sinfonietta. In the same year, she made her debut as Donna Elvira in Mozart's Don Giovanni. In 2011 she played the female leading role in Nuno Côrte-Real's opera 'Banskters' in Teatro Nacional de São Carlos, the Lisbon Opera House.

== Recordings ==
In October 2008 Sara Braga Simões and pianist Luís Pipa recorded a CD of the complete works for voice and piano by 20th-century Portuguese composer, Eurico Thomaz de Lima, to be released later in the year. Simões also appears in Ópera aberta, a documentary film by Leonor Areal on the 2004 world premiere of Os fugitivos.

== Operatic roles ==
- Pamina (Die Zauberflöte, Mozart) - Lisbon, Teatro Nacional de São Carlos
- Susanna (Le mozze di Figaro, Mozart)
- Zerlina (Don Giovanni, Mozart) - Faro, Teatro Municipal de Faro
- Gretel (Hänsel und Gretel, Humperdink)
- Despina (Così fan tutte, Mozart)
- The Governess (The Turn of the Screw, Britten)
- Zerlina, (Don Giovanni, Mozart)
- La Princesse (L'enfant e les sortilèges, Ravel)
- Rowan (The Little Sweep, Britten)
- Lauretta (La donna di génio volubile, Marcos Portugal)
- Clarice (Il mondo della luna, Pedro António Avondano)
- Spinalba (La Spinalba, F. António de Almeida)
- Elle (La Voix Humaine], F. Poulenc
- Principessa (La bella dormente nel bosco, O. Respighi)
- Madame Robin (Le fifre Enchantée, Offenbach)
- Volpino (Lo speziale, Haydn) - Orquestra de Câmara Musicare
- Fox (Příhody Lišky Bystroušky or The Cunning Little Vixen, Janáček)
- Jenny (Three sisters who are not sisters, Ned Rorem)
- Mathurine (L'ivrogne corrigé, Gluck)
- Chun Lee (Mumadona, Carlos Azevedo)
- Tumble Drier/Nancy's Mom (Evil Machines, Luís Tinoco)
- Marta (Os fugitivos, José Eduardo Rocha)
- Dama (Macbeth, Verdi)
- Aia/Salome (O Sonho, Pedro Amaral)
- Mimi Kitsch (Banksters, Nuno Côrte-Real)
- Inês (Inês Morre, Sofia Sousa Rocha)
- Criada (Fado Olissiponense, Luís Soldado)

== Concert performances ==
- Messiah, Händel
- Gloria, Poulenc
- Des Knabem Wunderhorn, Gustav Mahler
- Ein Deutsches Requiem, Johannes Brahms
- Nuits d'étè, Hector Berlioz
- E vo, Luciano Berio
- Trois poèmes de Mallarmé, Maurice Ravel
- Gloria, Händel
- Britten, Les illuminations
- Te Deum, Antonín Dvořák
- Shîr, João Pedro Oliveira
- Magnificat, Antonio Vivaldi
- Christmas Oratorio, Saint-Saëns
- Stabat Mater, Giovanni Battista Pergolesi
- Lacrymosa, Yanov-Yanovsky
- Lied der Waldtaube, Arnold Schoenberg
- Madrigals (Book I), George Crumb
- D’une saison… l’autre, A. Lemeland (World First)
- Dixit Dominus, Vivaldi
- Gloria, Vivaldi
- Credo, D. Pedro IV
- The Devil’s Suite, Peter Maxwell Davies
- Stabat Mater, Giovanni Battista Pergolesi
- Haddock’s Eyes, David Del Tredici
