= Guida Costa =

Guida Costa is a musician born under the name Maria Margarida de Almeida Costa on November 26, 1964, in Lisbon, Portugal (in the city's civil parish known as Lapa).

== Biography ==
She is chiefly a classical and jazz musician, moreover her musical style is frequently experimental - contemporary music. Her principal instruments are voice, trombone and euphonium.

She emigrated with her family to Canada in 1967.

As an artist (fine arts), she signs under the name Guida Almeida and has had her work exhibited on both sides of the Atlantic.

== Music Studies ==
She specialized in Contemporary Music at the Contemporary Music Encounters - Gulbenkian Foundation, Universidade Nova de Lisboa - Faculdade de Ciências Sociais e Humanas, McMaster University, and at the Lisbon National Conservatory among other places. At these locations her music studies were led by: Jorge Peixinho, Constança Capdeville, Karlheinz Stockhausen, Rui Vieira Nery and others. She studied the Trombone at schools and masterclasses with: Darrell Gillespie, Emidio Coutinho, Roger Bobo, and Eric Crees among other brass players/teachers.

== Current projects ==
Besides her solo work, groups in which she presently performs are:

- "Longitude Zero" (with Carlos Azevedo, Zeca Neves and Paleka)
- Lisbon Chaos Orchestra (with Joana Guimarães, Emílio Robalo, Roger Freitas, Joaquim Correia, Paleka and JS)
