= Carla Prata =

Angolan-Portuguese R&B singer-songwriter

- Born: September 5, 1999 (age 27); London
- Genres: Hip hop; trap; psychedelic
- Occupations: singer; composer
- Years active: 2014-present
- Label: Delby Music

Carla Prata (born September 5, 1999 in London) is an Angolan-Portuguese R&B singer-songwriter.

== Biography and career ==
Born in London, the daughter of Angolan parents, Prata lived as a child in the British capital and then spent part of her adolescence in Benguela, Angola. In 2018, she moved to Lisbon. She started to dabble in music when she was only 13 years old, after her father gave her a microphone and a MIDI keyboard. Her career began in 2013 with the publication of several cover videos on her YouTube channel. In 2015, she recorded his first studio song, All Right, a collaboration with Edson Roberto.

Prata has been featured on German platform COLORS, where she performed Certified Freak, followed by Owner a few months later.

== Discography ==
- 2016 - Vol. 1. (EP)
- 2017 - Com Calma (EP)
- 2020 - Roots prod. Sony Music (Album)
- 2024 - ‘ Pupa ‘ prod. Marchella Records (Album)
