= Zé Cabra =

Casimiro Afonso
- Born: Casimiro António Serra Afonso; 25 June 1965 (age 60)
- Origin: Gralhós, Macedo de Cavaleiros, Portugal
- Genres: Comedy
- Occupation: Singer

Casimiro António Serra Afonso, Zé Cabra (born 25 June 1965) is a former painter and comedy-singer from Portugal. He lives in France.

He was known for his shows in the most hidden villages of Portugal. Zé Cabra's acting gained him some popularity for a short time, when he recorded his first songs and appeared in a couple of TV shows. He was also known for his bad singing so he was never taken seriously. Zé Cabra has admitted that he can't sing.
