= Carlos Nóbrega =

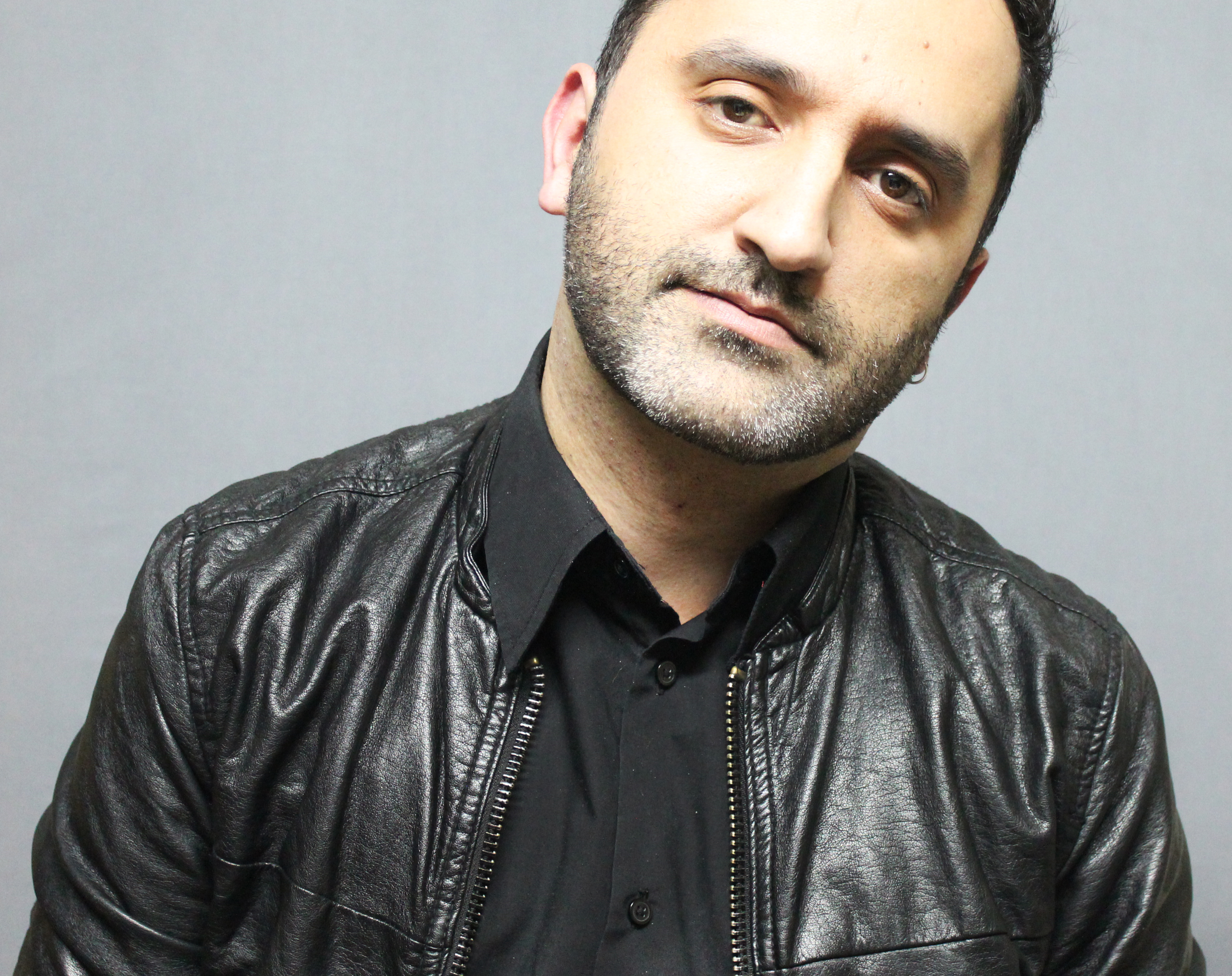

Background information
- Born: Carlos Nóbrega; 19 September 1979 (age 46)
- Origin: Funchal, Madeira, Portugal
- Genres: Pop, R&B, dance-pop
- Occupations: Singer, songwriter, producer, actor, writer
- Instruments: Vocals, Piano, Violin
- Years active: 1992–present
- Label: Kano Music Records
- Website: www.carlosnobrega.com

Carlos Nóbrega (Portuguese; born 19 September 1979, in Funchal) is a Singer, songwriter, actor, Photographer and Writer.

== Early life ==
Nóbrega was born and raised between Funchal, Madeira Island and Lisbon, Portugal. He is the second of two children, with an older sister, Carla. He attended Escola Superior de Educação do Porto and Escola Superior de Educação do Porto, a public university. He embarked on a singing career from age 12 and by the age of 17 he decided to go into acting.

== Career ==
Carlos Nóbrega took part in many talent shows on the TV such Cantigas da Rua (SIC – TV Channel), Nasci p'ra Musica (TVI – TV Channel), "Festival da canção Juvenil da Madeira" (RTP – TV Channel), "Festival da canção do Faial" (RTP – TV Channel), and events in Portugal and Europe. He got his start in television as an actor on the TV show Riscos, RTP and he starred in many movies, TV series, plays, in Portugal and Europe such Águila Roja, TVE, in Spain. He has contributed to numerous Disney soundtracks in Portugal and he was member of the successful Portuguese Pop Band Máximo in the 90s, having a number 1 in the music tops in Portugal with the Christmas song "O Natal Na Minha Terra" released by the label Vidisco, in 1998. According to his own officials' accounts and website he finished the thriller movie Desierto, from the Spanish director Jose Luis Endera. Having spent most of his life working diligently as a world renowned entertainer and performer, the 36-year-old artist, released his first charted single Pitiful, on 19 September 2011 and the EP: “Pitiful The echoes” , which includes the 8 official remixes and the acoustic version for "Pitiful", in December 2011. Pitiful, was featured on the compilation "This beat is POPTRONIK – VOL I", released in 2012 by Aztec Records and EQ Music and was one of the artists performing on the mini-tour Poptronik on Summer of 2012 2012. His second acclaimed and charted single was the single "Turn It Up", produced by Arake, and written & composed by himself and was released on 5 June 2012, followed by the charted single Music Makes you lose control, released on 13 August produced by DABEAT. In the same year he released with the Portuguese Dj Sky Santos, the house chilled track I Miss you . Between 2012 and 2014 he was touring in Spain with Los 40 Principales and spent most time composing his upcoming album.

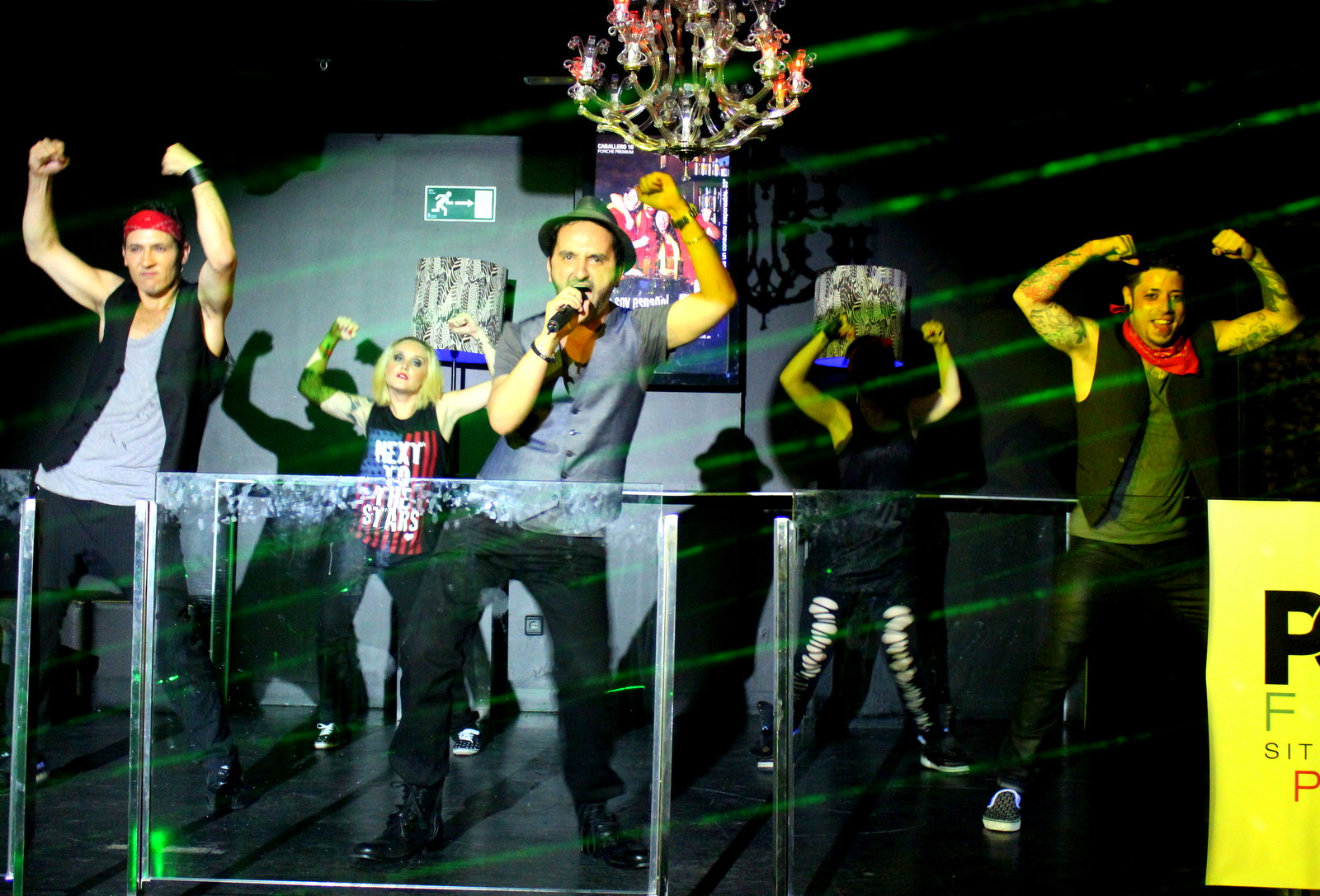
In concert, Madrid, 2014

.

Carlos released one year later from his latest release, the video for Breathe me directed by Fran Martinez, from Sia releasing a new covers Ep, called 'ALL OF ME - SONGS I WISH I WROTE ( The Piano sessions EP) ', on his social networks and website in November 2015, including covers from Sia, John Legend and A Great Big World . Carlos's Pop/Electro/R&B fused sound is mainly influenced by the likes of Chris Brown, Usher, Justin Timberlake, Danny Saucedo. His journey began writing songs from a very young age and now he is finally ready to unleash his electrifying debut album called The Art of Making Love, TAOML, to be released in 2016 according to his own accounts, blogs and official website.

== Discography ==
=== Studio albums ===
- 2016: TAOML, The Art of Making Love

==== Features ====
- 2012: This Beat Is POPTRONIK – Volume One by EQ Music

EP's

- 2015: ALL OF ME – SONGS I WISH I WROTE (The Piano sessions EP)
- 2012: Pitiful: The echoes EP.

==== Singles ====
- 2011: Pitiful
- 2012: Turn it up
- 2012: I miss you
- 2012: Music makes you lose control

== Television ==
Year	Title	Role	Notes
2014–15	Águila Roja	Pedro, Hortelano Portugués	TVE
2008	Rebelde Way	Jacinto	SIC
2006	Aqui não há quem viva	Miguel	SIC
2006	Dei-te Quase Tudo	Filipe	TVI
2007	Vingança	Victor	SIC
2005–06	Morangos com Açúcar	Rodrigo	TVI
1997–98	Riscos	Tiago	RTP
1998	Ora Viva	Carlos	RTP
1997–98	O último beijo	Joaquim	TVI
1998–99	Médico de Família	Jonas	SIC
1999	Jornalistas	Pedro	SIC
2002	Anjo Selvagem	João	TVI
2004	Inspector Max	Ricardo	TVI
1998	Terra Mãe	Manuel	RTP

== Filmography ==
Year	Title	Role	Director
2009	Gunas	Pedrinha	Miguel Santos
2016	Desierto	Raúl	José Luis Endera

== Theatre ==
Year	Title	Role	Director
2001–04	Como é que um chapéu pode meter medo.	Aviador	Victor Palma
2005–06	Otello - Opera Verdi by Antonio Pirolli and Nicolas Joel.		

== Gallery ==
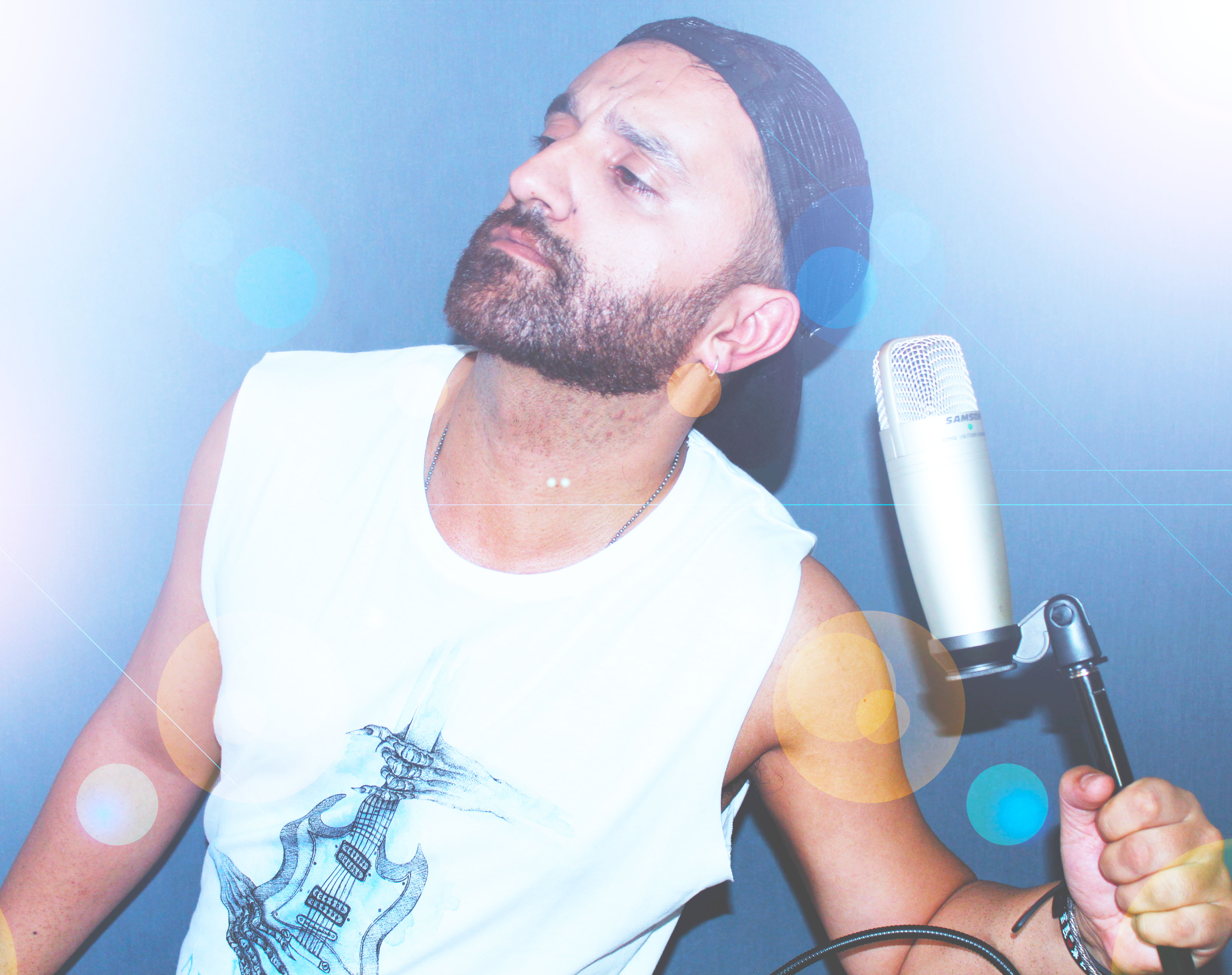
Carlos Nóbrega, Rock Archetype Star 2016

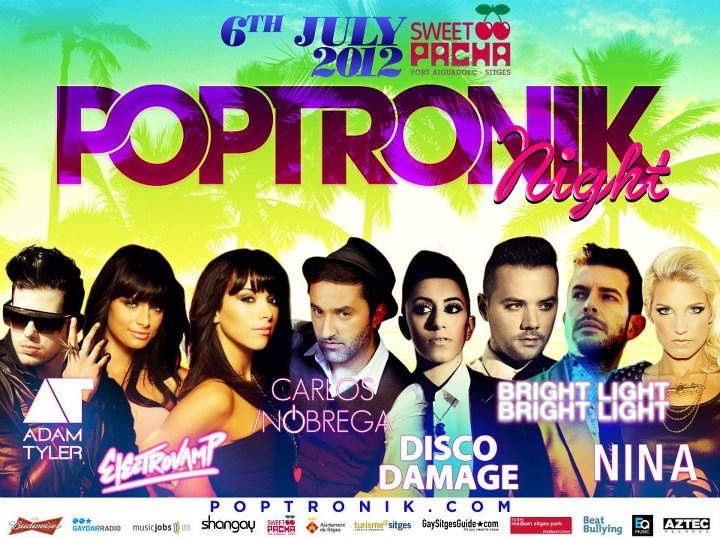
Carlos Nóbrega, Cartaz Poptronik Festival 2013

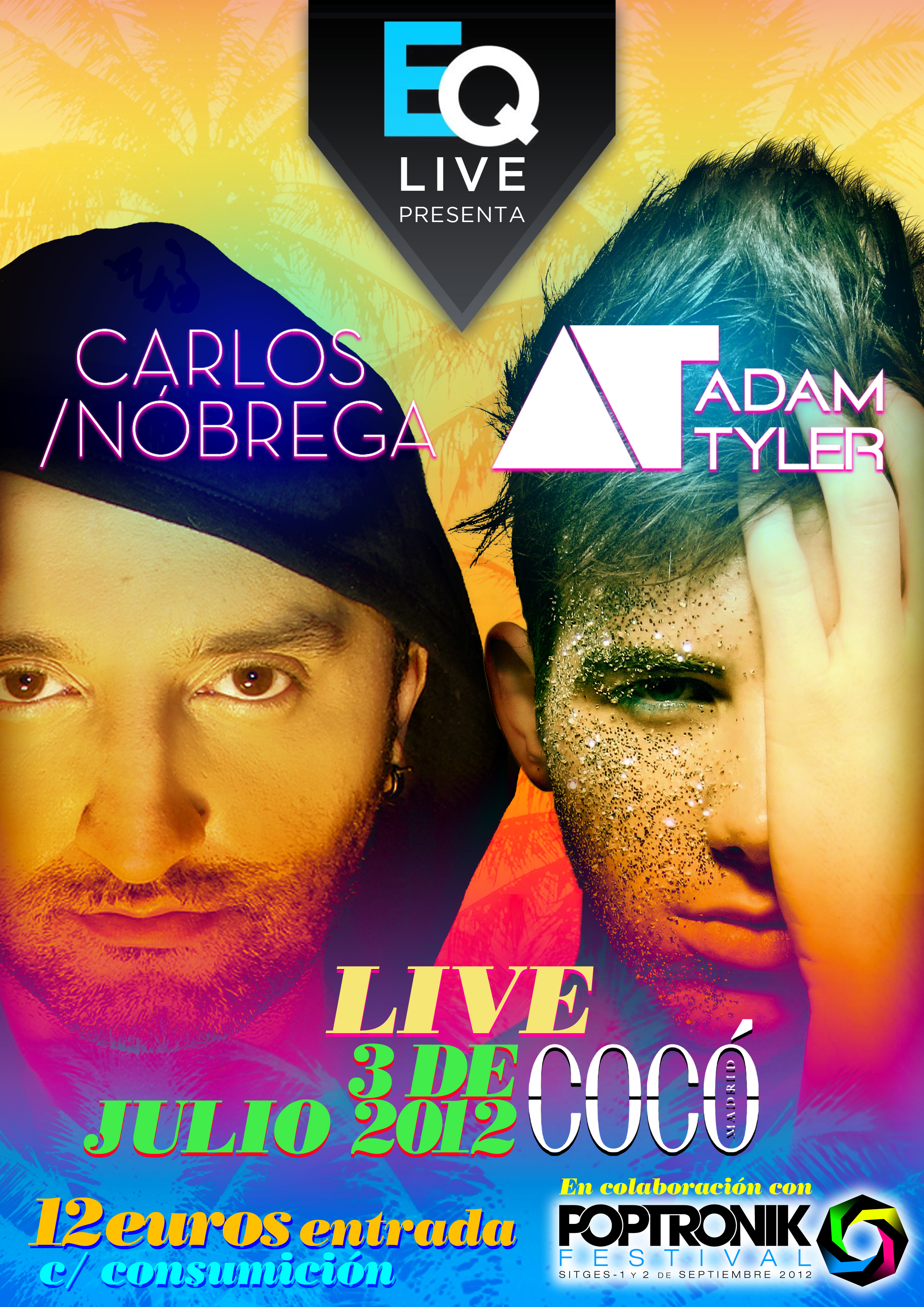
Carlos Nóbrega concerto com Adam Tyler, Madrid 2014

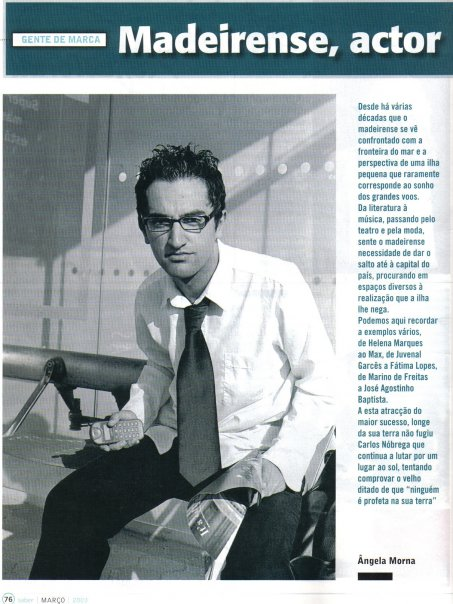
Carlos Nóbrega na revista Saber, Madeira2013

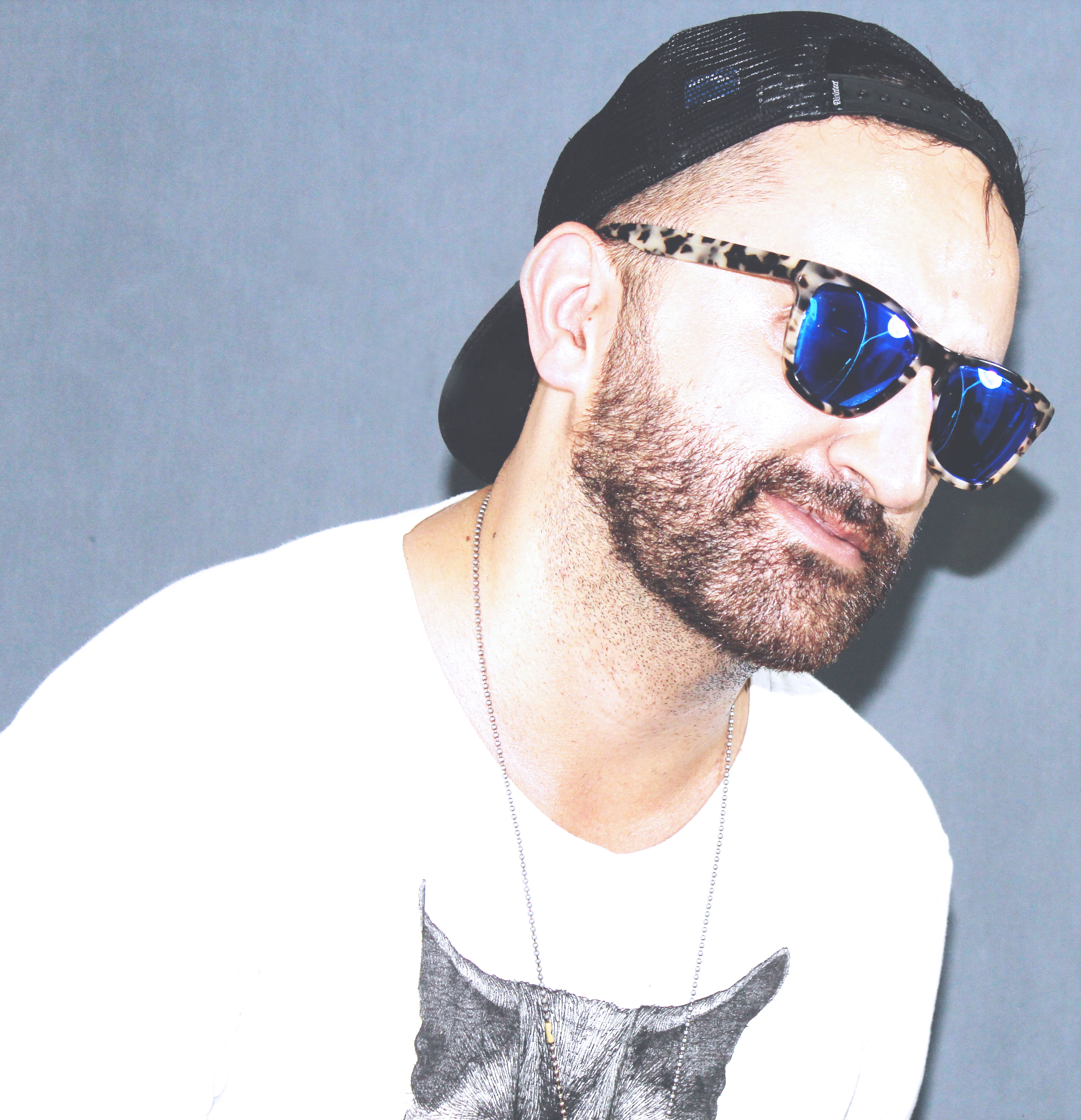
Carlos Nóbrega imagem marca Archetype, 2016

== Books ==
Year	Title	ISBN	Label
2016	Mi Respiro		Bubok
2012	O meu Respiro	9892022238, 9789892022239	Bubok
