= Ercília Costa =

Portuguese fado singer (1902–1985)

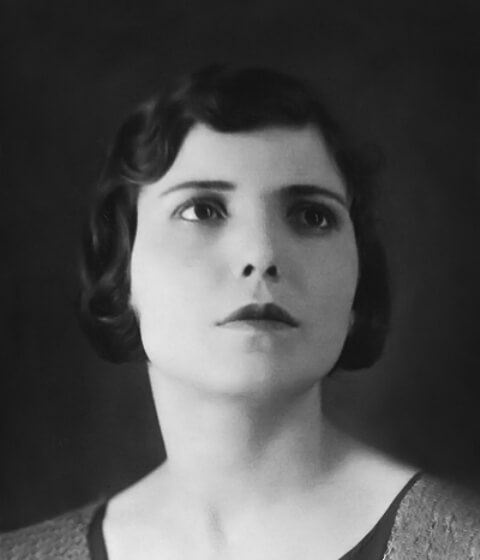
- Costa in the 1920s

Background information
- Born: Ercília Botelho Farinha Costa; 3 August 1902; Costa da Caparica, Portugal
- Origin: Lisbon, Portugal
- Died: 16 November 1985 (aged 83) Algés, Portugal
- Genres: Fado; revue
- Occupations: Singer; actress; composer
- Instruments: Vocals; guitar
- Years active: 1927–1972
- Spouse: José da Silva Salgueiro (m. 1949; died 1977)

Ercília Botelho Farinha Costa (3 August 1902 – 16 November 1985), was a Portuguese revue actress and composer and the first internationally renowned fado singer.

== Early life ==
Costa was born on 3 August 1902 in Costa da Caparica on the Atlantic coast of the district of Setúbal in Portugal. Her parents were fisherfolk. When she was three, her family moved to the Alcântara neighbourhood of Lisbon. At an early age she began work as a seamstress but soon changed to a theatrical career.

== Career ==
As a teenager, Costa performed at an audition to join the cast of a performance to be held at the Teatro Nacional de São Carlos in Lisbon. Although she was one of those selected, the project ended up being cancelled, but her performance remained in the memory of the actor Eugénio Salvador, who invited her to join the company at the Teatro Maria Vitória, also in Lisbon.

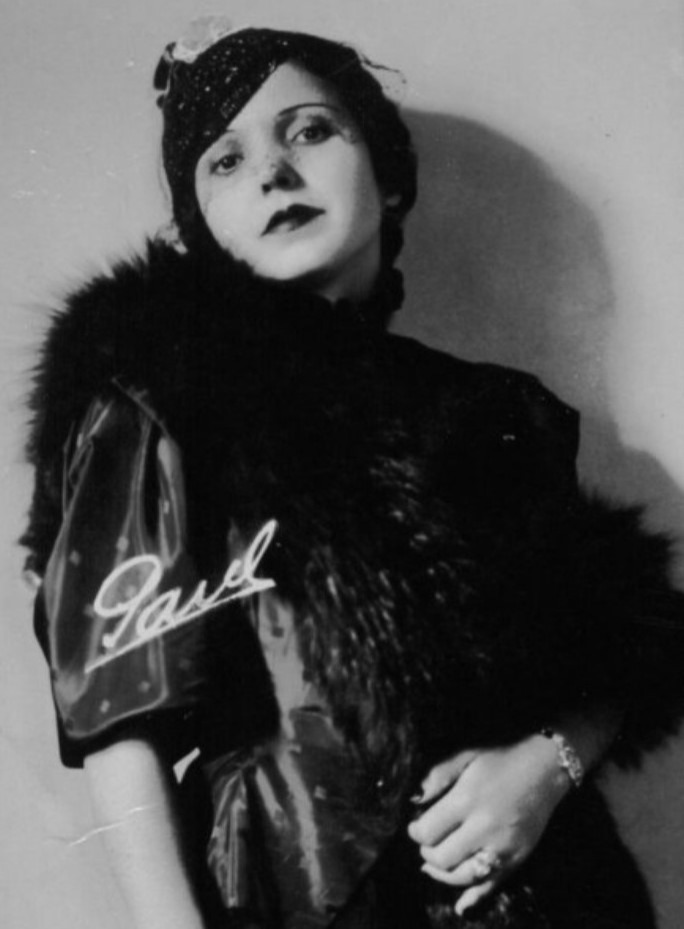
Costa in the 1920s

The beginning of her career as a fado singer took place in 1927, at the Teatro da Trindade, where she performed a duet with Alberto Reis. Previously, she had travelled around Portugal singing in choirs for theatrical shows. In 1930, she won First Prize in a fado competition organized by the magazine Guitarra de Portugal. The winning male performer was Alfredo Marceneiro, with whom, shortly afterwards, she joined the Troupe Guitarra de Portugal, a group of fado singers and instrumentalists who made themselves available for tours around the country. Throughout the 1930s Costa would be one of the fado singers invited to perform fado at revues, known in Portugal as Teatro de Revista, or magazine shows. Such shows included Feira da Luz, performed in 1930 at the Trindade; O Canto da Cigarra, presented the following year at Teatro Variedades, where she had great success with the song Fado Lisboa; Fogo de Vistas in 1933, at the Teatro Avenida; End of the World at the Coliseu dos Recreios in 1934; and A Boca do Inferno, presented in 1937 at Teatro Apolo.

She also appeared in films, such as Amor de Mãe, Amargura, Lisboa 1938, and Madragoa, where she played the role of mother of the protagonist, a character played by Carlos José Teixeira. In this film, directed by Perdigão Queiroga, and premiered in January 1952, Estêvão Amarante, Helga Liné, and fado singer Deolinda Rodrigues also participated. She also appeared on radio shows.

In 1932, accompanied by Armandinho among others, she performed in Madeira and the Azores and, in 1936, made her first departure from the country, to perform in Brazil. This marked the beginning of her long trips outside Portugal that would make her the first fado singer to become well known amongst Portuguese emigrant communities. Her first trip to Brazil was with the company of Vasco Santana and Mirita Casimiro, but her success was such that she stayed in Brazil after the company had returned home, not returning to Portugal until 1937. On her return Lisbon gave her two parties, one in the tea room at Café Chave d' Ouro and another at the Retiro da Severa.

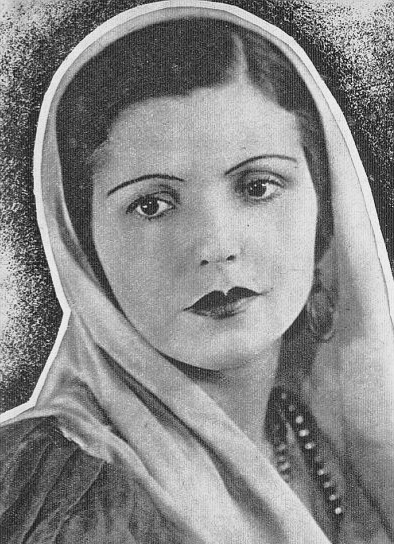
Costa in the 1930s

Also in 1937 Costa went to Paris to perform at the Comédie Française. Then, at the invitation of the Portuguese Propaganda Secretariat, she travelled to the US to perform in the Portuguese Pavilion at the 1939 New York World's Fair. Her appearance in New York was followed by ten months of performances in numerous cities in the US, with particular success in California, where she performed in Los Angeles and Hollywood. In 1945 she made her third tour to Brazil, staying for 15 months. On her return she substituted for Amália Rodrigues in a popular revue called Estás na lua!

She wrote and recorded many of her own songs, but the records are now difficult to find. She also took part in several films. After her participation in the film Madragoa, in 1951, she retired from public performances, but continued to record until 1972.

== Death ==
Costa died on 16 November 1985 in Algés near Lisbon.
