= José Carlos Xavier =

Portuguese operatic tenor

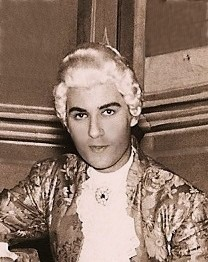
- José Carlos Xavier in Manon
- Occupation: Opera singer (tenor)

José Carlos Xavier is a Portuguese operatic tenor.

== Biography ==
A scholarship of the Calouste Gulbenkian Foundation, he graduated cum laude from the Liceo Musicale "G. B. Viotti", in Vercelli, Italy, where he took up residence.

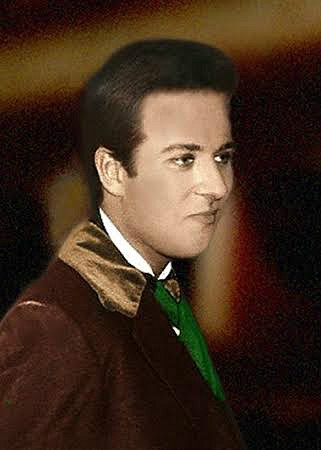
José Carlos Xavier performing at the Opera Don Pasquale the character "Ernesto"

== Career ==
Xavier made his debut at the São Carlos National Theatre, Portugal, interpreting roles in the operas Miguel Manara, Der Rosenkavalier, Louise, Dona Mécia, Rigoletto, and Fedora. Abroad, he played Ernesto in Don Pasquale, Dorvil in La Scala di Seta, Peppe in Pagliacci, Beppe in Rita, Des Grieux in Manon, Werther in Werther, Testo in Combatimenti di Tancredi e Clorinda, and Tamino in Die Zauberflöte.

He has performed at renowned music festivals, including Aix-en-Provence, Toulon, Kriens (Lucerne), Vilar de Mouros, Macau. An interpreter of lied and oratory music, he has performed recitals in several countries.

He commercially recorded for record label Decca (Valentim de Carvalho) and for the Basic Record Collection of the Secretary of State for Culture. He recorded recitals for RTP, TVE, and RDP- Radiodiffusion Française.

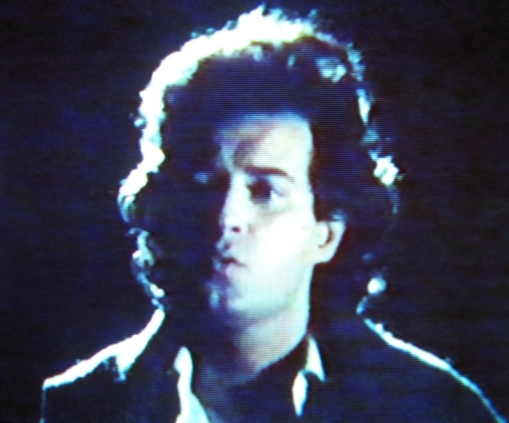
José Carlos Xavier in the Portuguese TV "Ficções do Interlúdio".

A lecturer in singing at the Lisbon National Conservatory of Music, he has supervised some of the most prominent Portuguese young lyrical singers.

He is the founder of the "Luisa Todi National Singing Competition" (eight editions) and has taught master's degree course in Portugal and abroad. He is a member of the panel at national and international competitions, such as the "Bidú Sayao International Singing Competition", the "Rio de Janeiro Municipal Theatre Singing Competition" in Brazil and also "The International Voice Competition City Of Trujillo" in Peru.
