= List of Portuguese bands =

The following is a list of Portuguese bands by alphabetical order.

== # ==
- 2B

== A ==
- The Act-Ups
- Aenima
- Ala dos Namorados
- Alexander Search
- Alma Lusa
- Os Amigos
- Amor Electro
- Anarchicks
- Aqui d'El-Rock
- Ava Inferi
- Os Azeitonas

== B ==
- Banda do Casaco
- Beautify Junkyards
- Best Youth
- Bizarra Locomotiva
- Blasted Mechanism
- Blind Zero
- Brigada Victor Jara
- Bunnyranch
- Buraka Som Sistema

== C ==
- Capitão Fausto
- Clã
- Cool Hipnoise

== D ==
- D.A.M.A
- D'ZRT
- Da Vinci
- Da Weasel
- Dæmonarch
- DarkWaters
- Dazkarieh
- Dead Combo
- Dealema
- Delfins
- Deolinda
- Doce
- Droban-Apherna

== E ==
- Easyway
- Excesso
- Expensive Soul

== F ==
- Fingertips
- Flor-de-Lis
- Fonzie

== G ==
- Gemini
- The Gift
- The Gilbert's Feed Band
- GNR

== H ==
- Hands on Approach
- Heavenwood
- Heróis do Mar
- Holocausto Canibal
- Holy Nothing
- Homens da Luta
- Humanos
- Hybrid Theory
- Hyubris

== I ==
- Icon & The Black Roses
- If Lucy Fell

== J ==
- Just Girls

== K ==
- Karetus

== L ==
- The Lemon Lovers
- Linda Martini
- Loto

== M ==
- Madredeus
- Mão Morta
- Micro Audio Waves
- Moonspell
- MTM

== N ==
- A Naifa
- Napa
- Nevada
- Nonstop
- Norton

== O ==
- Orelha Negra
- Ornatos Violeta

== P ==
- Papercutz
- Paranormal Attack
- The Parkinsons
- PAUS
- Petrus Castrus
- Pluto
- Pólo Norte
- Primitive Reason

== Q ==
- Quarteto 1111
- Quinta do Bill
- Qwentin

== S ==
- Santamaria
- Scar for Life
- Sean Riley & The Slowriders
- Sétima Legião
- Silence 4
- Spartak!
- Stealing Orchestra

== T ==
- Tara Perdida
- Tarantula
- Taxi
- Telectu
- Terra a Terra
- Toranja
- The Black Mamba

== U ==
- UHF
- Underground Sound of Lisbon
- Urban Tales

== V ==
- Verdes Anos

== W ==
- Wet Bed Gang
- Wraygunn

== X ==
- Xutos e Pontapés

== Y ==
- You Can't Win, Charlie Brown

== Z ==
- ZEM

== See also ==
- List of Portuguese singers
- List of Portuguese musicians
