= List of Portuguese musicians =

This is a list of Portuguese musicians in alphabetical order.

== A ==
- A Naifa
- The Act-Ups
- Amália Rodrigues
- Amélia Muge
- Ana Moura
- António Variações
- António Vitorino de Almeida
- António Zambujo
- Aurea

== B ==
- Banda do Casaco
- Blasted Mechanism
- Blind Zero
- Brigada Victor Jara
- Bunnyranch

== C ==
- Carminho
- Clã
- Cool Hipnoise
- Corvos
- Camané
- Carlos do Carmo
- Carlos Paredes
- Cristina Branco

== D ==
- David Fonseca
- Dazkarieh
- Da Vinci
- Da Weasel
- Dealema
- Delfins
- Deolinda
- Dillaz
- Doce
- Dead Combo

== E ==
- Expensive Soul

== F ==
- Favela Discos
- Fausto Bordalo Dias
- Fernando Tordo
- Fingertips

== G ==
- The Gift
- Gisela João
- GNR

== H ==
- Hands on Approach
- Heróis do Mar
- Humanos

== J ==
- Jorge Palma
- José Afonso
- José Mário Branco
- José Pinhal

== K ==
- Katia Guerreiro

== L ==
- Legendary Tigerman
- Linda Martini
- Loto

== M ==
- Madredeus
- Mafalda Arnauth
- Mafalda Veiga
- Mão Morta
- Mariza
- Moonspell

== N ==
- Nonstop

== O ==
- Ocaso Épico
- Ornatos Violeta

== P ==
- Paco Bandeira
- Paulo de Carvalho
- Paulo Gonzo
- Pedro Abrunhosa
- Pólo Norte
- Primitive Reason

== Q ==
- Quarteto 1111
- Quinta do Bill

== R ==
- Richie Campbell
- Rouxinol Faduncho
- Rui Penha
- Rui Veloso

== S ==
- Sérgio Godinho
- Sétima Legião
- Silence 4
- Stockholm Lisboa Project
- Salvador Soblar

== T ==
- The Gift
- Toranja

== U ==
- UHF
- Underground Sound of Lisbon

== V ==
- Vitorino

== W ==
- Wraygunn

== X ==
- Xutos e Pontapés
