= GFB =

GFB may refer to:

- Genç Fenerbahçeliler, a group for supporters of Turkish sports club Fenerbahçe S.K.
- Georgia Farm Bureau Federation, an American agricultural organization
- German Fetish Ball, an annual fetish event
- The Gilbert's Feed Band, a Portuguese rock band
