= Aqui d'el-rock =

Aqui d’El-Rock
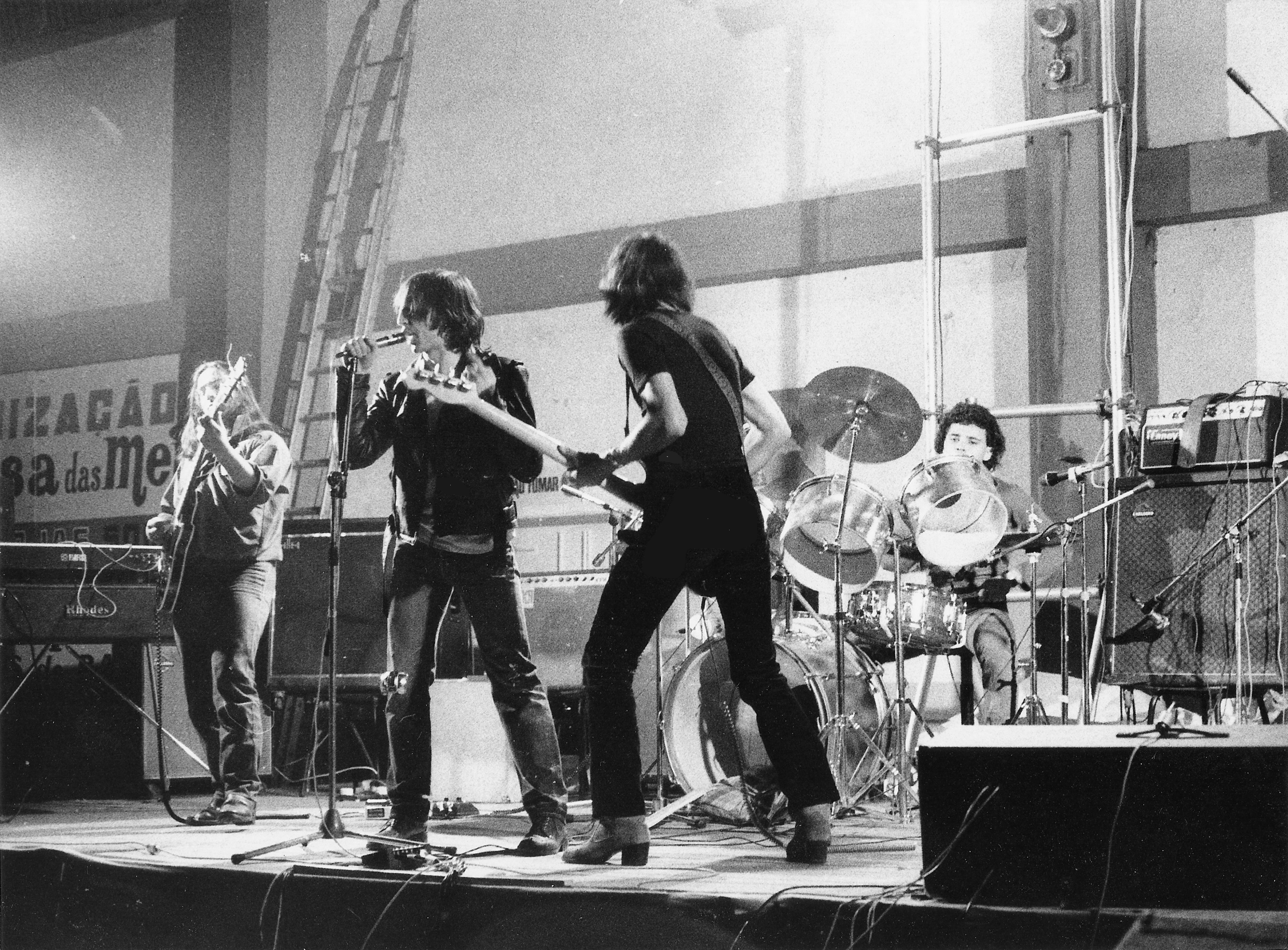
- 1st gig - May 29, 1978 (C.A.C.O., Lisbon)

Background information
- Origin: Lisbon, Portugal
- Genres: punk-rock
- Years active: 1977–1981
- Labels: Metrosom, Rave Up Records, Zerowork Records
- Past members: Zé Serra; Fernando Gonçalves; Alfredo Pereira; Oscar Martins; Carlos Cabral; Alberto Barradas; Carlos Gonçalves
- Website: Facebook Page, YouTube Chanel

Aqui d'El-Rock was a Portuguese pioneer punk rock band, created in Bairro do Relógio, Lisbon (1977), being the first one to be able to record a phonogram in this music style.

== Biography ==
Aqui d'El-Rock was a band created in "Bairro do Relógio" (aka Bairro do Cambodja), a deprived neighbourhood of Lisbon, demolished in the late 1990s Lisbon by Zé Serra (drums), Fernando Gonçalves (electric bass), Alfredo Pereira (electric guitar), and Oscar Martins (voice and electric guitar). The first three had been playing since 1973 in dance bands, whose repertoire was suitable for parties and other festive occasions. Later on, they played covers of well-known bands such as Black Sabbath, Deep Purple, Grand Funk Railroad, and the Stooges.

The band desired to dedicate themselves exclusively to a rock sound and the composition of songs in Portuguese, inspired by the aesthetics associated with the punk movement. At the same time, the Revolution of 25 April 1974 that led to a profound change in the political regime in Portugal, brought about the need of a reorientation of the group's philosophy, henceforth called "Aqui d'El-Rock".

The band debuted at the Clube Atlético de Campo de Ourique in Lisbon on 29 April 1978 and went on to become the leading figure of one of the first manifestations of punk rock in Portugal, which was emphasized by the publication of two vinyl singles (1978 and 1979), being that the word "punk" is highlighted on the cover of the first one. The scarce resources used in the sound recording, resulting in its low quality and the use of some instruments built by the musicians themselves, show the group's rebellious character, also expressing their ideal of authenticity, one of the central values in the punk movement.

Using metaphor and irony, their songs dealt with urban everyday situations such as unemployment, marginality, and immoderate behaviours. The aggressiveness of the musical and performative style, based on structural simplicity and in the vigorous rhythms of rock 'n' roll style, reinforced its challenging and provocative character - within the universe of modern music - to the complexity and virtuosity of the so-called "symphonic rock", which had been accentuated since the beginning of the 1970s.

After recording their second single in 1979, the group played in shows, along with other recently created bands who developed musical styles also inspired by punk rock (UHF, Os Faíscas, Xutos & Pontapés, among others), and their participation in the first part of the show of the English band Eddie & The Hot Rods (“Coliseu dos Recreios de Lisboa”, July 1978) was important to their career. Furthermore, the song "'Há que violentar o sistema'", a reference in the band's repertoire, was recorded in one of the first video clips of a Portuguese rock group.

After Pereira left the group in mid-1979, Carlos Cabral (electric guitar), Carlos Gonçalves (vocals) and Alberto Barradas (electric guitar and secondary vocals) were part of the group, in short and diverse phases, which coincided with the period in which he participated in the opening of several shows by foreign artists, namely Lene Lovich (Lisboa and Porto), Wilko Johnson & The Solid Senders and Cheap Trick (Lisbon and Porto).

Despite its short career, Aqui d'El-Rock created a repertoire in the Portuguese language and was the protagonist of one of the first manifestations of Portuguese rock. Its pioneering and marginal character inspired the appearance of other similar bands.

Some of their songs are part of revivalist collections, such as Grande Geração Rock (Metrosom, 1997), dedicated to Portuguese rock groups, and Killed By Death Vol. 41 (Redrum, 1998), dedicated to punk rock. In 2001, the Brazilian Ratos de Porão made a version of the song "Eu não sei". In Portugal, the same theme was covered by the Eskizofrénicos and the Speedtracks re-recorded (with adapted lyrics) the classic "Há que violentar o sistema". This song was also newly approached by the Clockwork Boys, in late 2005, and by Avô Varejeira, in 2010.

In 2007, as a celebration of the 30th birthday of the band, the Italian "Rave Up Records" published a limited edition of 500 copies of an EP on red vinyl.

The lyrics of the song "'Há que violentar o sistema'" were amongst those analysed in the book "'As Palavras do Punk'", by Paula Guerra & Augusto Santos Silva (Alêtheia Editores, 2016).

Subsequently (from last quarter 1981 to March 1982), the band took the name "Mau-Mau" and created a new repertoire, stimulated by the emerging styles of the new wave sound, as can be heard in the songs edited in a 1982 single (‘Shanghai’ and ‘Vietsoul’).

== Concert inventory ==
- 29/04/1978 - Lisbon, Pavilhão CACO
- 06/05/1978 - Cacia
- 27/05/1978 - Barreiro, Casquilhos
- 03/06/1978 - Leiria
- 08/07/1978 - Lisbon, Coliseu ("Eddie & Hot Rods" opening)
- 05/08/1978 - Faro, Estádio S. Luís
- 29/09/1978 - Condeixa-a-Nova
- 21/10/1978 - Covilhã
- 18/11/1978 - Lisbon, Brown's Club
- 24/11/1798 - Lisbon, Cine-Teatro da Encarnação
- 03/02/1979 - Águeda
- 10/02/1979 - Castelo Branco
- 17/02/1979 - Almada, Canecão
- 29/04/1979 - Tomar
- 05/05/1979 - Lisbon, Liceu D. Pedro V
- 12/05/1979 - Chaves
- 26/05/1979 - Coimbra, Olivais
- 23/02/1980 - Lisbon, Pav. "Os Belenenses" (1ª parte "Wilko Johnson" opening)
- 18/04/1980 - Paço de Arcos, Nautic School
- 25/04/1980 - Lisbon, Alameda da Universidade
- 17/05/1980 - Porto, Pav. Infante de Sagres ("Lene Lovich" opening)
- 18/05/1980 - Cascais, Pav. of Dramático ("Lene Lovich" opening)
- 06/06/1980 - Porto, Pav. Infante de Sagres ("Uriah Heep") (Note - The contract was paid, but no action was taken.)
- 12/06/1980 - Lisbon, F.I.L.
- 13/11/1980 - Lisbon, Pav. Alvalade ("Cheap Trick" opening)
- 14/11/1980 - Lisbon, Pav. Alvalade ("Cheap Trick" opening)
- 14/11/1980 - Porto, Pav. Infante de Sagres ("Cheap Trick" opening)
- 03/04/1981 - Caldas da Rainha
- 11/04/1981 - Lisbon, Clube Oriental de Lisboa
- 23/04/1981 - Lisbon, Rock Rendez-Vous
- 11/07/1981 - Glória do Ribatejo
- 18/12/1981 - Vila Franca de Xira ("Mau-Mau")

=== Recordings ===
- 09/06/1978 - 1st single; (Há Que Violentar o Sistema / Quero Tudo) Arnaldo Trindade Studios, Lisbon
- 09/08/1978 - Videoclip " Há Que Violentar o Sistema", RTP (Filming in the area of a ruined palace next to the Curry Cabral Hospital, Lisbon)
- ??/??/1979 - 2nd single; (Eu Não Sei / Dedicada - A Quem Nos Rouba) Arnaldo Trindade Studios, Lisbon
- 15-16-28/12/1981 & 04/01/1982 - Single "Mau-Mau" ("Xangai" and "Vietsoul"); Arnaldo Trindade Studios, Lisbon
- On 15 June 2021, the 2 first two historical singles of Portuguese punk were reissued by Zerowork Records, together, on a single-sided LP. This 12" includes a fold-out poster with the entire history of the band (lyrics, photos, posters, interviews, and unpublished data). It's available in two versions: - 150 copies in red vinyl (cover on a black background, with red and silver), - 150 copies in black vinyl (cover on a red background, with black and silver).

=== Other events ===
- 13/03/1982: Participation in the commercial radio program "Febre de Sábado de Manhã"; Cinema Nimas, Lisbon
- 28/03/1982: Participation in the RTP television program "Passeio dos Alegres"; Lumiar Studios, Lisbon
- 18/10/2019: The documentary "Zé Pedro Rock'n'Roll" by Diogo Varela Silva was shown on this date at DocLisboa'19, which includes the themes "Há Que Violentar o Sistema" and "Quero Tudo". This doc became available to the public in theaters on 30 July 2020.

== Discography ==
- Há que violentar o sistema / Quero Tudo (Single - Metrosom, 1978)
- Eu não sei / Dedicada - a quem nos rouba) (Single - Metrosom, 1979)
- Grande Geração do Rock (collection - Metrosom, 1997)
- Killed By Death Vol. 41 (LP, collection - Redrum Records, 1998)
- In 2001, the Brazilian Ratos de Porão made a version of "Eu não sei". In Portugal, this theme was covered by the Eskizofrénicos and the Speedtracks re-recorded (with an adapted lyric) the classic Há violentar o sistema. This song also took a new approach by Clockwork Boys at the end of 2005 and Avô Varejeira in 2010.
- Brava Dança (2006) – The song Dedicada (a quem nos rouba) was included in the soundtrack of the documentary by Jorge Pereirinha Pires and José Francisco Pinheiro about the band Heróis do Mar.
- Há que violentar o sistema / Quero Tudo / Eu não sei / Dedicada (a quem nos rouba) (EP, Rave Up Records, 2007) was released in celebration of the band's 30th anniversary in red vinyl.
- On 15 June 2021, the 2 first two historical singles of Portuguese punk were reissued by Zerowork Records, together, in a single-sided LP. This 12” includes a fold-out poster with the entire history of the band (lyrics, photos, posters, interviews, and unpublished data). It’s available in two versions: - 150 copies in red vinyl (cover on a black background, with red and silver). - 150 copies in black vinyl (cover on a red background, with black and silver).

== Related publications ==
- As Palavras do Punk by Paula Guerra & Augusto Santos Silva (Alêtheia Editores - 2016)
- Feature article published in "Jornal Mapa", issue #32, October / December 2021, with text by Diogo Duarte (online edition: https://www.jornalmapa.pt/2022/05/06/ha-que-violentar-o-sistema/)
- Fonoteca Municipal do Porto: Update (05/05/2022) information and material on Aqui d'el-Rock, adding the EP published in 2021 by Zerowork Records (https://fonoteca.cm-porto.pt/artistas/aqui-del-rock/)
