= Quinta do Bill =

Portuguese Celtic folk rock musical group

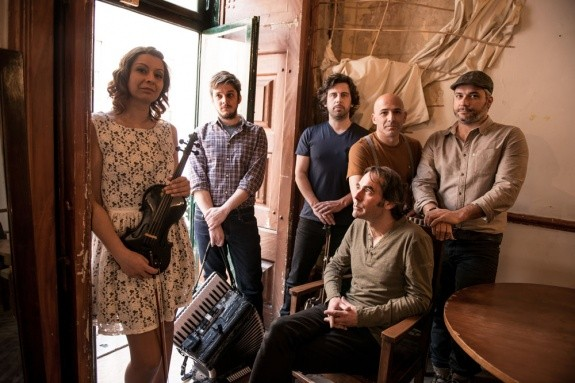
- Quinta do Bill, (2016).

Background information
- Origin: Tomar, Santarém, Portugal
- Genres: Folk rock, Celtic music, Fado
- Years active: 1987–present
- Labels: Dansa do Som, PolyGram, Universal, Som Livre, Espacial
- Members: Carlos Moisés; Pedro Cruz; Cató; Jorge Costa; Paulo Bizarro; Dalila
- Past members: Rui Dias; João Coelho; Pedro Ferreira; Fernando Paulo; João Portela; Alfredo Fonseca; Paulo Jorge; Nuno Flores; Pedro Pimentel; Miguel Urbano

Quinta do Bill (Bill's Farm in English) is a Portuguese folk rock musical group from Tomar formed in 1987.

== Beginning ==
In September 1987 at Mr. Guilherme's (Portuguese cognate for William, and so known as Bill) farm Quinta do Bill (Bill's Farm) was born by the hands of Carlos Moisés, Paulo Bizarro and Rui Dias.

That year they took part in the first Modern Music Show from RUC (Rádio Universidade de Coimbra) and in 1988 in the fifth Rock Rendez-Vous contest, where they reached the final. For being finalists they won the right to record the song "Zézé," included in the collection Registos.

In 1990 they reached the semi-finals of the contest Rock Pepsi-RFM and won the first prize at the first RTP contest Aqui D'el Rock, which gave them the chance to record their first album Sem Rumo two years later.

== Success ==
One year later the album Os Filhos da Nação was released by Polygram, reached the gold record and took the band to stages from the north to the south of Portugal that year and the following one during two tours with more than 100 concerts. This album includes hits like "Os Filhos da Nação", "Senhora Maria do Olival", "Aljubarrota" (released the first time on Sem Rumo) and "Quando Eu era Pequenino", which is both a Portuguese and a Brazilian traditional song.

In 2003, FC Porto staff (as both players and technical staff, including the former FC Porto coach José Mourinho) recorded the song "Filhos do Dragão", which is the Quinta do Bill's song "Os Filhos da Nação" with adapted lyrics, and it became a major hit among the team supporters. Middle way, they were the support band of Bryan Adams' concert in José Alvalade Stadium, with enthusiastic encore request from the crowd.

In 1996 they released the album No Trilho do Sol, again a gold record, including hits such as "A única das Amantes", "No Trilho do Sol" and "Se te Amo", driving the band to a large tour. In September they performed a live concert for more than 40,000 people in the Avante! festival.

1998's Dias de Cumplicidade by Polygram reached the silver record with the help of the single "Voa (Voa)".

== Nowadays ==
In the following years the band made tours, released a Best of... (1999), and recorded new songs for the album Nómadas, which was released in 2001 by Universal Music and had the special participation of the Moroccan singer Amina Alaoui and the Iranian Bijan Chemirani in the percussions.

After the release of Ao Vivo Tour 2003, the record of the band's live performance in Queima das Fitas of coimbra, Quinta do Bill returned to an album of originals, releasing in December 2006 A Hora das Colmeias. The record has the participation of well known names as writer José Luís Peixoto and songwriters Pedro Abrunhosa, Miguel Castro, Tim, Adolfo Luxúria Canibal, João Afonso, Sebastião Antunes, Moz Carrapa and João Portela.

In 2007 the band celebrated their twentieth anniversary with a show in their hometown Tomar that was recorded to be released in CD and DVD . Sete (Seven) is the name of the band's seventh album, released in 2011 and produced by Nuno Rafael; it reached number five in Portuguese Top Charts.

Commemorating the twenty-fifth anniversary the band released 25 Anos - As Baladas, a compilation of their hit love songs with two new ones.

In 2013, the 25 Years tour ended in OPorto on New Year's Eve with the band performing for 100.000 people.

In 2014, celebrating the twenty-five years of the group biggest hit “Os Filhos da Nação”, the band played in Oporto's most famous venue, the Coliseu, with Banda Sinfónica Portuguesa. All the band's biggest hits with were played with symphonic arrangements in a two-hour show that was later released in a two CD/DVD pack.

2015 was a busy year, working on the songs for a new album to be released in March 2016 while touring Portugal and the islands in a 30 dates tour that also brought the Symphonic show to crowd of 10,000 at the band's hometown of Tomar.

== Members ==
Carlos Moisés (vocals/acoustic guitar/flute since 1987), Paulo Bizarro (electric bass/fretless/double bass since 1987), Cató (electric guitar/acoustic guitar/banjo since 1995), Jorge Costa (drums/percussion since 2000), Dalila (violin since 2005)Pedro Cruz (accordion/acoustic guitar/keyboard since 2020), .

Former band members: Rui Dias (guitar 1987–1992), João Coelho (drums 1987–2000), Pedro Ferreira (keyboards 1987–1990), Fernando Paulo (guitar 1987–1988), João Portela (lyrics 1989 - ), Alfredo Fonseca (keyboards 1990–1993), Paulo Jorge (guitar/banjo 1992–1995), Nuno Flores (violin/viola 1993–2006), Pedro Pimentel (keyboards/accordion 1993–1997) and Miguel Urbano (accordion/acoustic guitar/keyboard 1997–2020).

== Discography ==
- Sem Rumo - Dansa do Som - 1992
- Os Filhos da Nação - Polygram- 1994
- No Trilho do Sol - Polygram - 1996
- Dias de Cumplicidade - Polygram - 1998
- Best of - Universal - 2000
- Nómadas - Universal - 2001
- Ao Vivo Tour 2003 - Som Livre - 2004
- A Hora das Colmeias - Espacial - 2006
- 20 Anos ao Vivo - Espacial - 2006 CD/DVD
- Sete - Espacial - 2011
- 25 Anos - As Baladas - 2012
- Sinfónico - Ao vivo no Coliseu do Porto com a Banda Sinfónica Portuguesa - 2015
