= Look What You Made Me Do (disambiguation) =

"Look What You Made Me Do" is a song released in August 2017 by Taylor Swift. It may also refer to:

== Music ==
- "Look What You Made Me Do", track from the 1968 album I've Been Doin' Some Thinkin' by American pianist and singer Mose Allison
- "Look What You Made Me Do", b-side from the 1997 single Bad Idea by British alt rock band A
- "Look What You Made Me Do", a song on the June 2017 mixtape 508-507-2209 by Joyner Lucas
- Look What You Made Me Do, a 2017 EP by all-female Portuguese punk rock band Anarchicks

== Other uses ==
- Look What You Made Me Do, a 2011 exhibition by Australian artist Luke Cornish
- Look What You Made Me Do, a 2017 show by Australian comedian Demi Lardner
- Look What You Made Me Do, a personal substack of Eugene S. Robinson, vocalist for the US band Oxbow

== See also ==
- Now Look What You Made Me Do, 1997 film written by Canadian screenwriter Marie Clements
- See What You Made Me Do, 2019 book by Australian writer Jess Hill and adapted in 2021 TV series
