= Zé Pedro (musician) =

José Pedro Amaro dos Santos Reis
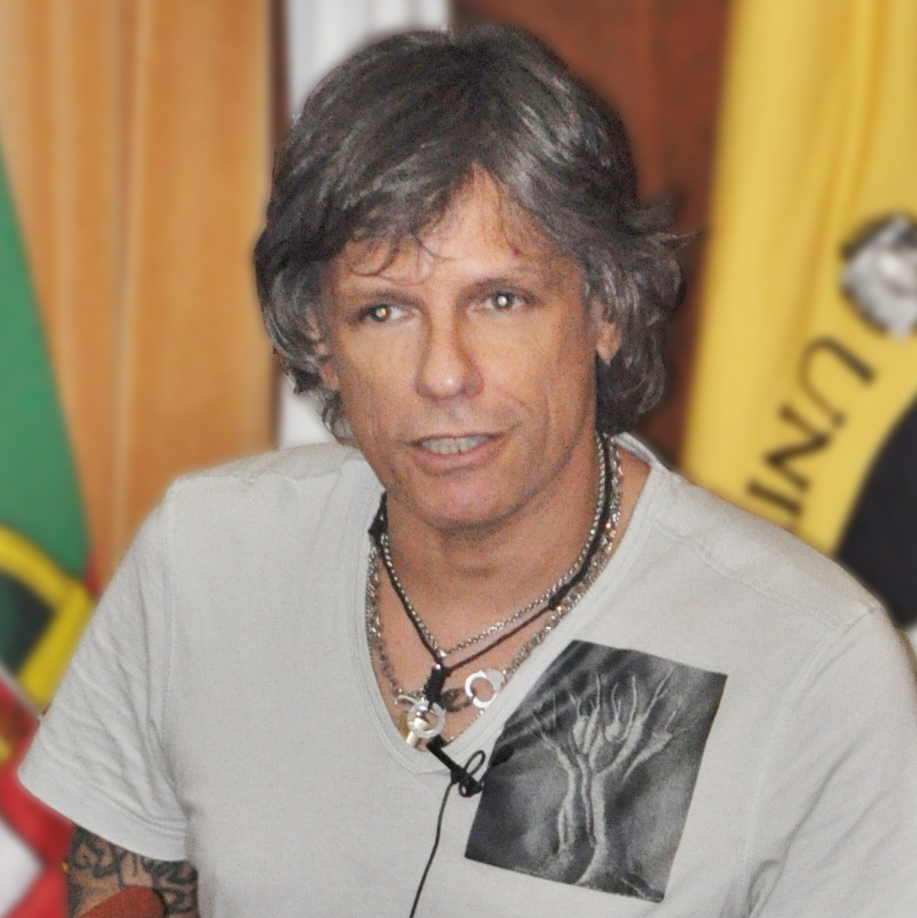

Background information
- Born: September 14, 1956; Lisbon, Portugal
- Origin: Portugal
- Died: November 30, 2017 (aged 61) Lisbon, Portugal
- Genres: Rock

José Pedro Amaro dos Santos Reis ComM • ComL, professionally known as Zé Pedro (Lisbon, 14 September 1956 – Lisbon, 30 November 2017), was a Portuguese composer, musician , guitarist, and founder of the rock band Xutos & Pontapés.

== Career ==
At 22 years old, he founded the band Xutos & Pontapés after placing an ad in a newspaper requesting "a drummer and bassist for a punk band."

Despite being a rhythm guitarist, he was considered an icon of Portuguese rock, and composed many of Xutos e Pontapés' songs.
