= Verdes Anos =

The Verdes Anos fado group is a Portuguese musical group founded in 1996, known for performing and popularizing Coimbra's Fado and the Portuguese guitar.

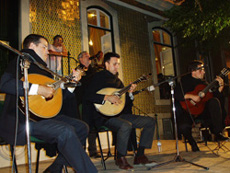
Verdes Anos in Sesimbra, Portugal

The group Verdes Anos, named after a song by Carlos Paredes, was created in 1996 and is the result of a deep involvement of its members in the academic and cultural life in the city of Coimbra. All of them are, or have been, students in Coimbra and active in the cultural life of the city. Examples being the Music Conservatory, the Orfeon Académico de Coimbra and the Tuna Académica da Universidade de Coimbra.

Verdes Anos have performed in several cultural events all over the country (ex. Euro 2004, Coimbra-National Capital of Culture, Expo 98 Lisbon, TV and radio broadcasts, concert halls, tributes to personalities related to music from Coimbra) and abroad (performances in Italy and Macau, representing the city's culture as well as tours in Germany and Japan).

== Members ==
- António Dinis (singer)
- Gonçalo Mendes (singer)
- Rui Seoane (singer)
- Luis Barroso (Portuguese guitar)
- Miguel Drago (Portuguese guitar)
- João Martins (classical guitar)
