= Terra a Terra =

Terra a Terra is a band from Portugal.

== Discography ==
=== Albums ===
- 1980 «Dançando pulirando»
  - Dançando pulirando
  - Luisinha
  - Não se me dá que vindimem
  - Raparigas, cantai todas!
  - Primavera
  - Pingacho
  - Chula de Carreço
  - Malhão de Mira
  - Diabos levem os ratos
  - Segadinhas
  - No alto daquela serra
  - Santiago Sentissima Grande
  - Tanta silva, tanta amora
- 1981 «Pelo toque da viola»
  - O rapaz do casaquito (Minho)
  - Pelo toque da viola (Baixo Alentejo)
  - Chula rabela (Alto Douro)
  - Olha o passarinho! (Baixo Alentejo)
  - Gallandum (Trás-os-Montes)
  - Triste malhão (Beira Alta)
  - Que queres te eu traga? (Açores)
  - Vá de binga (Beira Baixa)
  - Sete varas tem (Trás-os-Montes)
  - Pêras e pão (Beira Alta)
  - Mariana (Beira Baixa)
  - Tirana, atira! (Açores)
- 1983 – Estilhaços
- 1984 – Lá Vai Jeremias
- 1998 – O Melhor dos Melhores (Compilation)
- 2000 – Clássicos da Renascença (Compilation)
