= The Lemon Lovers =

Band from Portugal

The Lemon Lovers are a Portuguese band from Porto city. The band started with João Pedro Silva and Victor Butuc in 2012.

Their first EP called Hangover commenced in a basement during three days in April 2013 and the band had the chance to take their bluesy rock 'n' roll all around Portugal for two years. Many songs were written in this time and in 2015 their debut album Loud, Sexy & Rude came out. Leaving the basement behind The Lemon Lovers recorded and mixed their debut album at Reno Studios in Madrid with the mentoring of Braís González. The mastering took place at Magic Garden Studios, in Los Angeles by Brian Lucey, who worked with Arctic Monkeys, The Black Keys, etc.

"The 55" and "No Shoes" were the first two singles and both music videos were directed by Vasco Mendes. "No Shoes" song was featured in "New Portuguese Talents" by Fnac Portugal and also won the best music video of 2016 by P3 - Público.

In 2015, The Lemon Lovers did "The 55 Bus Tour" on over 30 stages in nine different countries in less than 40 days. They had the chance to grow their fan base and play for a wider audience. In 2016 the band made the "Lost in Viségrad Tour", ten shows in Czech Republic, Slovakia, Hungary and Poland over the first two weeks of March. After that, their second album came to life - Watching the Dancers entirely recorded and mixed onto analog tape by João Brandão and mastered by Miguel Pinheiro Marques at Estúdios Sá da Bandeira in Porto.

"Cosmic Lovers", "Mexican Way" and "Wrong" were the three singles released by the band to promote their second album Watching the Dancers.
