= Urban Tales =

Portuguese gothic rock/metal band

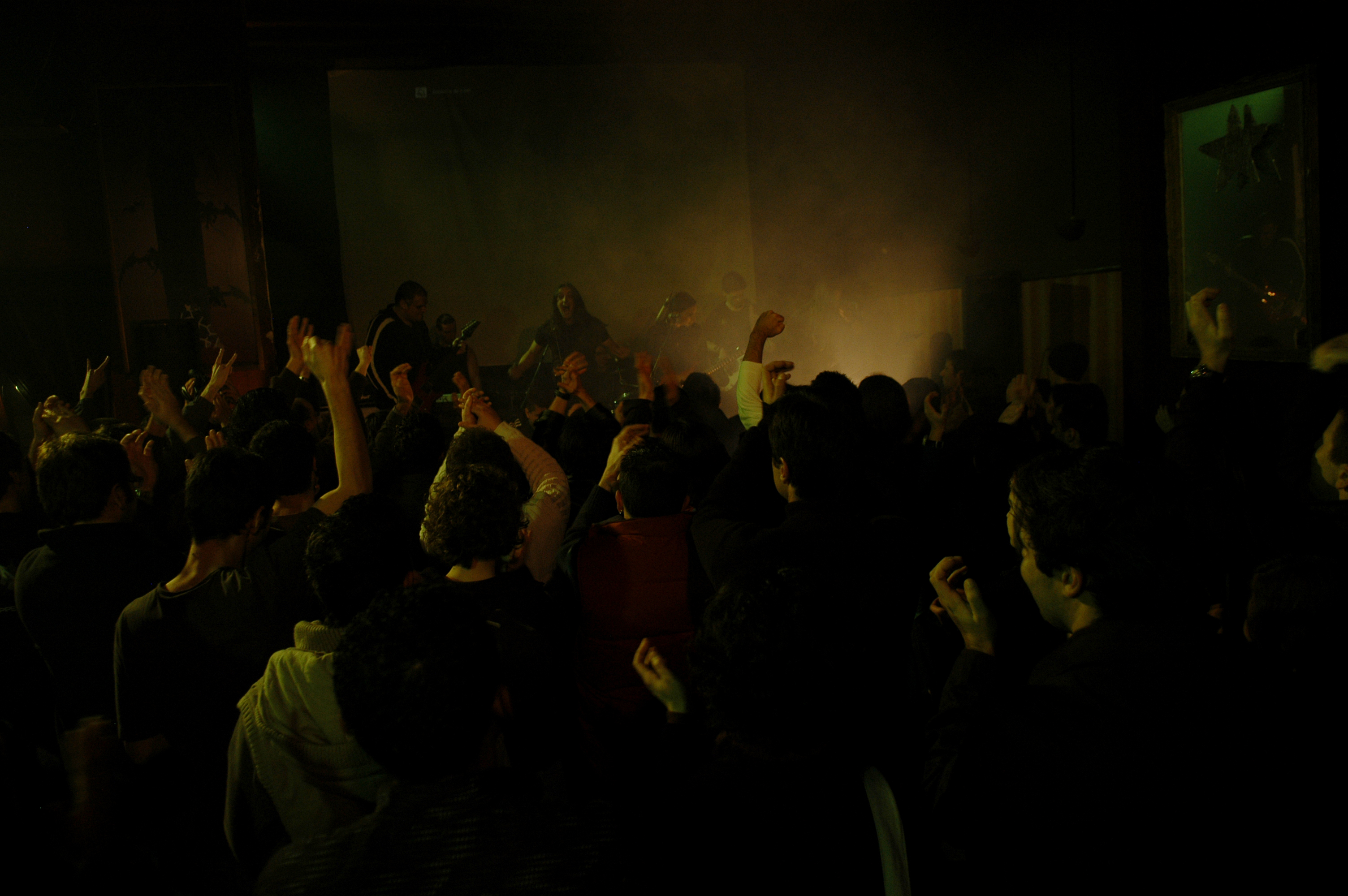
- Urban Tales performing in "O Culto", in Cacilhas While recording for the music video "In Purity" in 2007

Background information
- Origin: Lisbon, Portugal
- Genres: Gothic rock; gothic metal; heavy metal
- Years active: 2005–2018
- Labels: MR Diffusion; Farol Musica; Burning Star; Compact
- Members: Marcos Cesar Dinis
- Past members: Jota; John Cyagha; Tiago Borges; Jon Van Dave
- Website: mrdiffusiononline.com

Urban Tales is a Portuguese rock music project based in Lisbon, with acoustic, heavy metal and gothic influences in their sound. Formed in 2005 by frontman Marcos César, the band quickly became one of the top metal acts in their native country, Portugal. Their name was influenced by the Brazilian band Legião Urbana.

Their discography includes two full-lengths albums, Diary of a No (2007), Loneliness still is the friend (2011) a 3-song EP, Alive (2008) and 4 singles "The Name of Love" (2016), "The Start feat Loren Dayle" (2017), "All Said and Done feat Sofia Pires" (2017), and "A Loucura No Amor feat Victor Espadinha" (2018), which will all be included on a yet to be released album, already named Reborn.

Marcos, mentioned in an interview that the new work will be very different from the previous one, and that will be sung in Portuguese and English.

== History ==
=== "Diary of a No" era ===
In the first year of existence, the Lisbon project recorded their first demo, with songs as relevant as In Purity, You'll Never Know or Until I Died. With the first 4 songs, the UT, attracted the attention of the media (mainly of the well-known Metal Incandescente blog), being even considered as one of the most promising national bands, by several specialized music sites. With some options to edit the first album of originals, the band signed with the international Burning Star Records, thus ensuring distribution and promotion worldwide. While recording the debut album, they finished the first video for the single that was already on the national radio In Purity. With João Correia performing and Rui Neto as main actor, the band reached a new level of exposure as several television channels such as MTV, SIC Radical and was considered one of the best music videos of the year. Single In Purity got the top of the most requested music lists for several months.

In November 2007, the project's first album was released. Titled Diary of a NO, the work reflects the experiences of vocalist and mentor Marcos César and demonstrates the band as one of the strongest of the year. Diary of a No, was released in digipack format and with the artwork created by Guto Soares; contains 10 songs, a documentary with a making of, of the album (as well as several extras).

The album surpassed expectations at the sales level and achieves positive reviews all over the world. The second single, Prison Inside, also got at the national (and international) radios, as well as the second video (realized by Ricardo Capristano), and it appeared in several television programs. "Farewell" was the third single which also features a video by Marco Bertrand. The reception for the new song was also positive. At the end of the promotion of the album, a latest online videos released Fade Away by Vasco Gomes.

During the recordings of the album Tiago Borges (bass) joined the band and in the summer Jota (drums) and Johnny (guitar) teamed up with Urban Tales.

In late 2007 Urban Tales did some live performances with guests Pedro Barradas (guitar), collaborated with Urban Tales on the "Alive" EP, keeping Jon Van Dave (keyboards) and Claudia Dias (vocals) as usual guests in the shows. "Diary of a No".

The album was released as a digipak containing an extra DVD with many extras (music demos, official videos, a documentary, etc.).

The artwork was made in Brazil by the well known artist Guto Soares.

=== "Alive" single ===
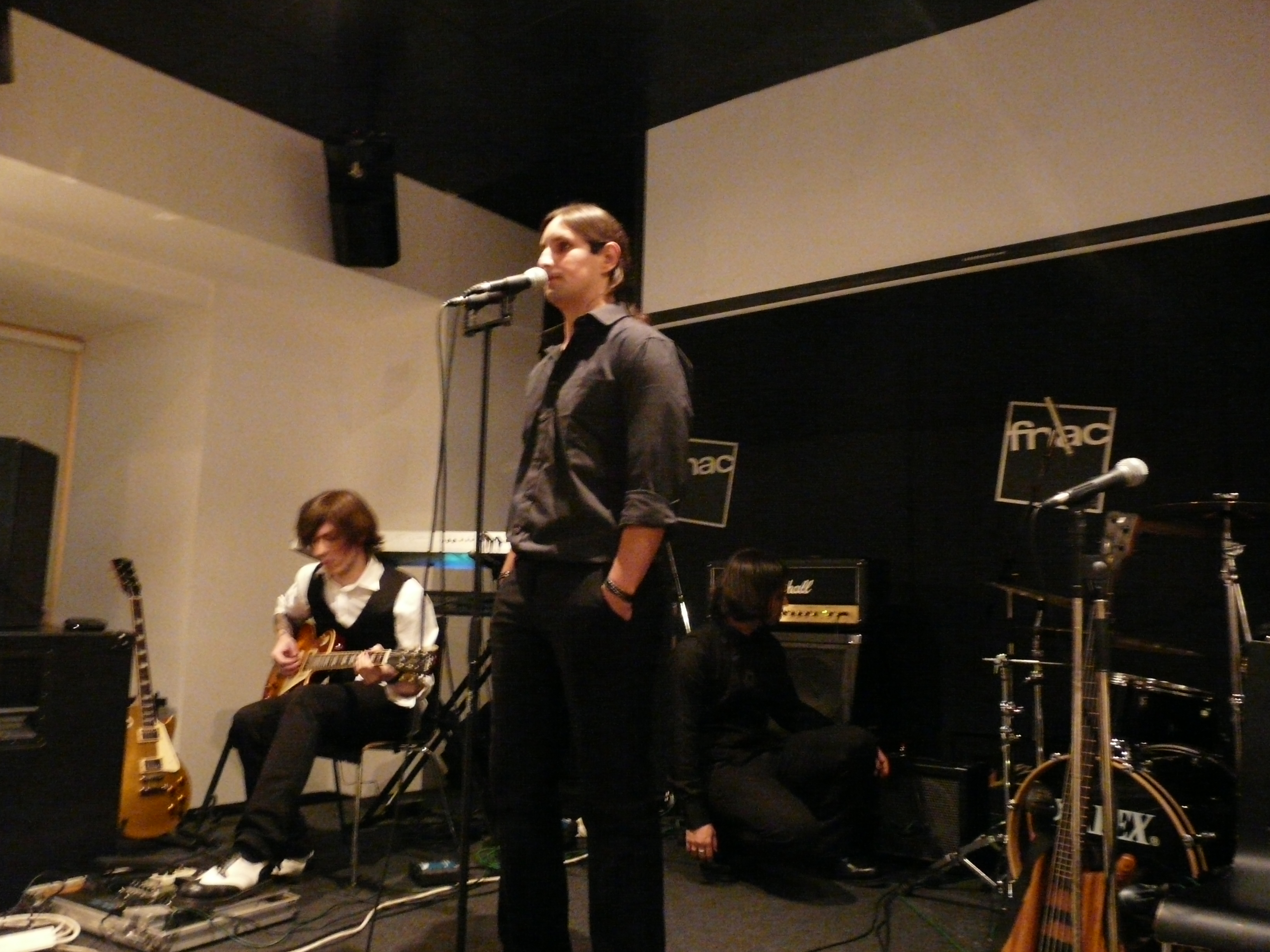
Urban Tales at Fnack Chiado to present Alive single

In 2008, the project saw the creation of songs for the new album interrupted, when they received the invitation to create the Hymn of the Federation of Rare Diseases of Portugal (FEDRA). The band enters the studio with violinist Nuno Flores (The Crown) and created the theme "Alive". This song reached noticeable visibility throughout the country, reaching, once again, radios (Best Rock fm, RCP, Super fm) and mainstream television channels (TVI, RTP1 and RTP2). The theme runs out at the Chiado Fnac store on the presentation day. "Alive" is a CD multimedia single, which contains three songs, photos and a making of, of the song and is edited by FEDRA and distributed by Editora Compact Records.

The work was pre produced by Marcos and Urban Tales, recorded in the Academia Estúdios and mixed and mastered by Daniel Cardoso.

UT Live in Fnac Chiado for the "Alive" CD Presentation which sold out all the CDs in the venue.

=== "Loneliness Still Is the Friend" ===
In 2010 and before being released the second album of originals, is released a first single titled "Stand Alone" mixed and mastered Dave Chang. The band launched the official video that has a television debut on Portuguese MTV Headbangers Ball. In March 2011, Through the label Compact Records, Urban Tales released "Loneliness Still Is the Friend", the album demonstrates a more aggressive and organic sound that was acclaimed by critics, and is even referred to as one of the best rock/metal album of the year (Via Noctuna, A Trompa). One of the highlights the participation of the album is the participation of the actor Vitor de Sousa in the theme "Despair".

The album was mixed by the vocalist and composer Marcos César and mastered by Njal Frode and contains 10 tracks.

The artwork was again made by the Brazilian Guto Soares.

It is said that from this album several songs and videos were unreleased, and that they might be posted in their Urban Tales YouTube official profile at any moment.

=== Hiatus ===
After their second full-length the band stopped in a break of 5 years. This time was taken to the vocalist dedicate himself in producing other bands. In 2012, and while Marcos was assisting other producers and mixing bands he wrote the songs for what it would be the third and new album of Urban Tales.

=== "Reborn" and singles ===
In January 2018, it was known that the future album to be released from Urban Tales is entitled Reborn, in order to state, that the band does not follow strictly the gothic rock metal style; not saying, however, that this style will be revoked from the next album. The band, through a press release, also announced that they intend to launch some songs digitally, before publishing an album for physical stores.

"The physical album will contain many extra songs as well with a lot of extras.", said the vocalist Marcos César.

"Reborn" will be a conceptual album and all songs will be connected into one unique story.

==== "The Name of Love" ====
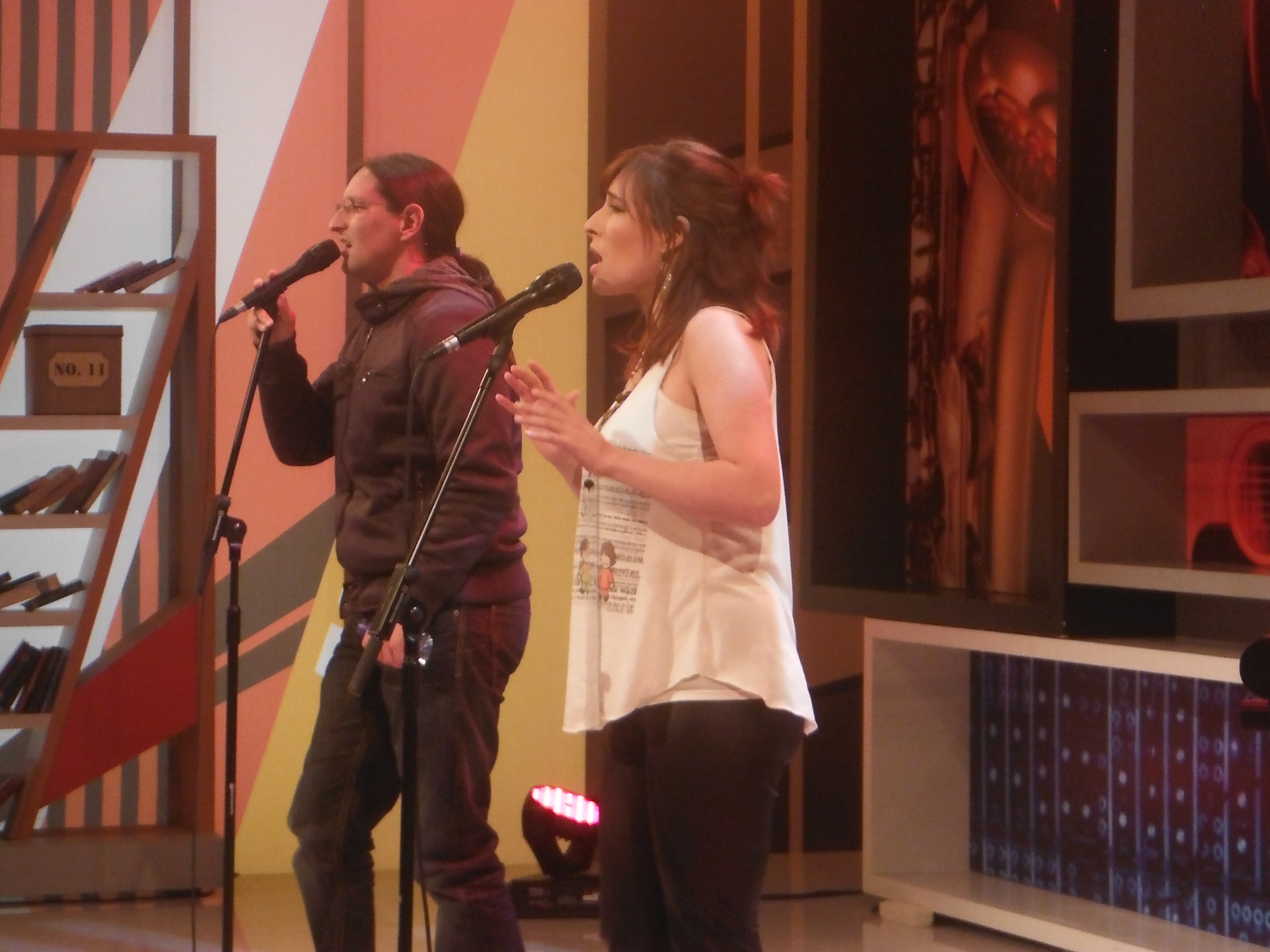
Soundcheck for the "5 para a meia noite" TV program

The new single titled "The Name of Love", released digitally in 2016, and edited by Farol Música, reached the top spot in national iTunes chart, radio. The theme features American actors Erik A. Williams and Tracy Burr. The theme cover photo was taken by the Icelandic photographer Dagur Jonhson. The Name of Love features an official video filmed in Dortmund and was recorded by actor / director Tadeuz Janewsky being Sonia Lakta the female actress. The project premiered the song on Nilton's well-known RTP1 TV channel "5 Para a meia noite" show, where the main guest, was the prime minister, António Costa.

==== "The Start" feat. Loren Dayle ====
In 2017 the Urban Tales, launched the single The Start, which counts on the participation of Canadian rapper Loren Dayle. The video clip, was again made by Tadeuz Janewsky and addresses the issue of domestic violence, a difficult subject in Portugal, at the time of the release of the single. The song was mixed and mastered by the composer and singler Marcos César and was released again by the label Farol Musica.

The cover photo of the single was again attributed to Icelandic Dagur Jonhson.

==== "All Said and Done" feat. Sofia Pires ====
The third single from the future Urban Tales album was released on 14 July, again by Farol Música. The single sounds like a rock/pop song and counts on the participation of singer and instrumentalist Sofia Pires. The single receives a lot of attention from national and international radios and even achieves the iTunes Portuguese chart The band released a lyric video on their official YouTube channel.

==== "A Loucura No Amor" feat. Victor Espadinha ====
On 8 January, Urban Tales, released the fourth single from the third album: "A Loucura No Amor". The singularity of this song is that it contains the participation of the singer and actor Victor Espadinha and is no more than a small introduction to the rest of the album.

At this point, the band from lisbon changes of label, now working with MR Diffusion Records.

A short lyric video for the song was made.

==== "The Way" ====
"The Way" would be the last single released from the music project before the release of the album. The single is a return to the rock/metal/gothic genre, and quickly received worldwide radio airplay, in countries like Netherlands, UK, Ireland, Canada, Portugal, Germany, USA, and many more.

The single was exclusively presented in the TV program "Go-S.tv", from the TV channel "Sic Radical" in a lyric video.

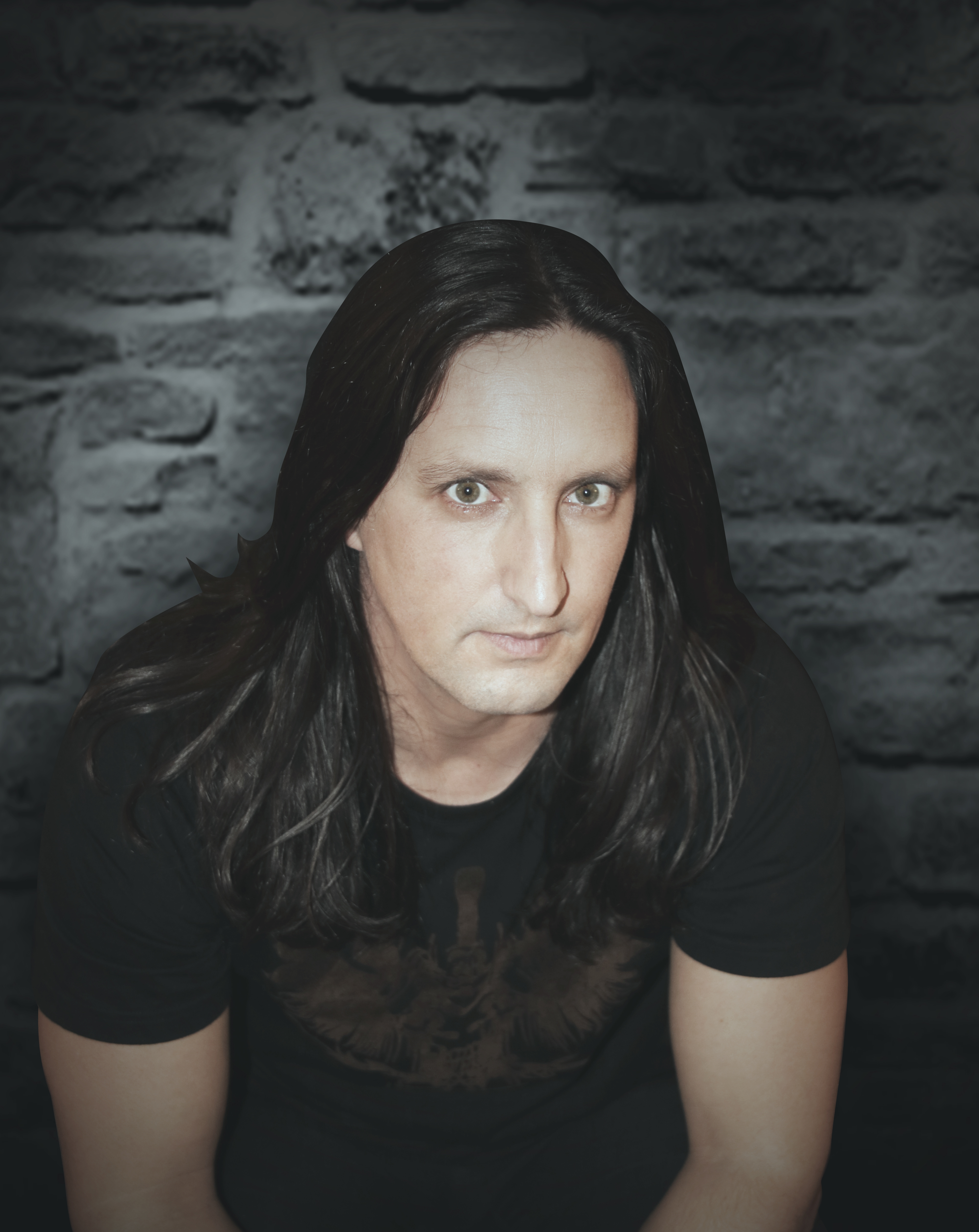
Front man of the band Urban Tales, Marcos Cesar

The Vocalist Marcos César, talked, in the same program, about the future of the band and what to expect of the future album.

== Discography ==
=== Studio albums & singles ===
==== Diary of a No ====
- Label: Burning Star Records
- Year: 2007

==== "Alive" single ====
- Label: FEDRA / Compact Records
- Year: 2008

==== Loneliness Still Is the Friend ====
- Label: Compact Records
- Year: 2011

==== Reborn (singles) ====
- "The Name of Love"
- Label: Farol Música
- Year: 2016
- "The Start" feat Loren Dayle
- Label: Farol Música
- Year: 2017
- "All Said and Done" feat Sofia Pires
- Label: Farol Música
- Year: 2017
- "A Loucura No Amor" feat Victor Espadinha
- Label: MR Diffusion Records
- Year: 2018
- "The Way"
- Label: MR Diffusion Records
- Year: 2018

== Award nominations & charts ==
- 2007 Loud Magazine Awards - (2º Best album of the year / 2º Best band of the year / 2º Best revelation band of the year) - Diary of a No album
- 2007 A Trompa - 30 best album of the year - Diary of a No Album
- 2016 iTunes Portuguese Chart - 1ºPlace - The Name of Love single
