= Mão Morta =

Portuguese rock band

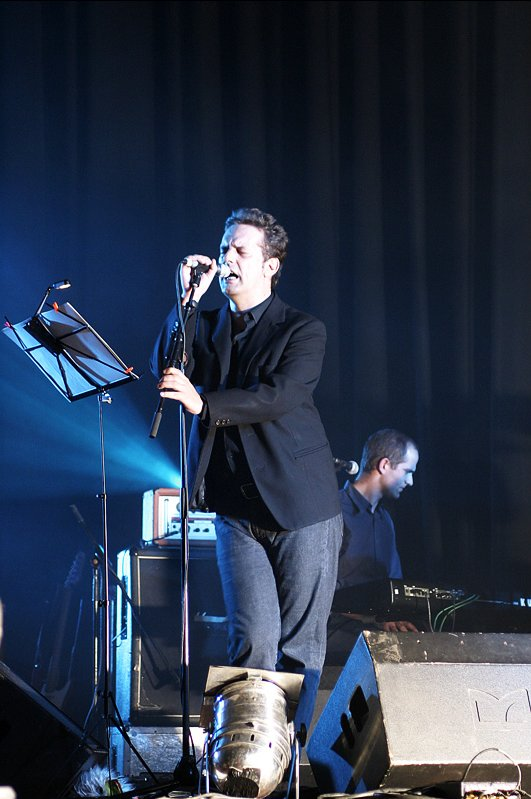
- Mão Morta in Lisbon.

Background information
- Origin: Braga, Portugal
- Genres: Alternative rock, post-punk, death rock, noise rock, avant-garde rock
- Years active: 1984–present
- Labels: Cobra Discos, Fungui, NorteSul, Áres Total, Sony BMG, Universal Music, Ama Romanta
- Members: Adolfo Luxúria Canibal; Miguel Pedro; António Rafael; Sapo; Vasco Vaz; Joana Longobardi
- Past members: Marta Abreu; José Pedro Moura; Carlos Fortes; Zé dos Eclipses; Joaquim Pinto; Paulo Trindade
- Website: mao-morta.org

Mão Morta is a Portuguese avant-garde rock band that started its activities in 1985 in Braga. The group's name means "dead hand", based on a traditional Portuguese nursery rhyme. They are generally considered to be one of the most important bands in the Portuguese rock scene and have since reached a cult status. Since the start of their career, their live concerts became famous for their intensity and dark mood, due to their signature alternative rock sound and the performance of vocalist Adolfo Luxúria Canibal (a pseudonym, meaning Adolph Cannibal Lust), known for occasional onstage theatrics and his gravelly voice, half-sung, half-spoken singing style. Mão Morta's music is difficult to categorize as they incorporate a variety of genres; from punk rock, metal, to industrial and experimental. Their sound, combined with Adolfo's lyrics, reflects urban violence, a human search for pleasure, freedom and a critique of contemporary consumerist society, often with sarcastic humour.

== Members ==
=== Current members ===
- Adolfo Luxúria Canibal - vocals, songwriter
- Miguel Pedro - drums, programmer, composer, producer
- António Rafael - keyboards, guitar, composer, producer
- Sapo - guitar
- Vasco Vaz - guitar, composer
- Rui Leal - bass

=== Past members ===
- Marta Abreu - bass (2000)
- José Pedro Moura - bass, composer (1990 - 2000)
- Carlos Fortes - guitar, keyboard, bass, composer (1986 - 1994)
- Zé dos Eclipses - guitar, songwriter, composer (1985 - 1991)
- Joaquim Pinto - bass, keyboard, composer (1984 - 1990)
- Paulo Trindade drums - (1987)
- Joana Longobardi bass

== Discography ==
=== Studio albums ===
- Mão Morta (1988)
- Corações Felpudos (1990)
- O.D., Rainha do Rock & Crawl (1991)
- Mutantes S.21 (1992)
- Vénus Em Chamas (1994)
- Há Já Muito Tempo Que Nesta Latrina O Ar Se Tornou Irrespirável (1998)
- Primavera de Destroços (2001)
- Nus (2004)
- Pesadelo em Peluche (2010)
- Pelo Meu Relógio São Horas De Matar (2014)
- No Fim Era o Frio (2019)

=== Live albums ===
- Müller No Hotel Hessischer Hof (1997)
- Ao Vivo na Aula Magna 8 de Maio 2001 (2001, bonus disc from Primavera de Destroços)
- Carícias Malícias (2003)
- Maldoror (2008)
- Rituais Transfigurados - Mão Morta Vs. Maya Deren (2009)

=== Singles and promos ===
- Desmaia, Irmã, Desmaia / Desmaia, Irmã, Desmaia (1990)
- Anjos Marotos / Negra Flor (1993)
- Cães de Crómio (1994)
- Sangue no Asfalto (1995)
- Faixas de Rodagem 5 (1995) - Chabala
- Chabala (1996)
- Em Directo Para a Televisão / Jogos de Guerra (1998)
- É Um Jogo (Radio Edit) (1998)
- Turbulência (1999) - Anjos da Pureza
- Cão da Morte / Chabala (versão longa) (2001)
- Gumes5 (O Rei Mimado) / Gnoma (2004)

=== Compilations ===
- Mão Morta Revisitada (1995)

=== Original soundtracks ===
- Respirar (Debaixo de Água) (2004) - Oub'lá

=== Other ===
- À Sombra de Deus - Braga 1988 (1989) - 1º de Novembro
- Ama Romanta 86-89 (1999) - Oub'lá
- Insurrectos (1990) - Véus Caídos
- Variações - As Canções de António (1994) - Visões - Ficções (Nostradamus) (tribute album to António Variações)
- Os Filhos da Madrugada (1994) - O Avô Cavernoso (tribute album to José Afonso)
- À Sombra de Deus Vol. 2 - Braga (1994) - Rotte - A Morte é um Acto Solitário
- Uma História de Amor (1995) - Cães de Crómio
- Portugales (1995) - Visões - Ficções (Nostradamus)
- Pop Rock Em Português (1997) - Budapeste (Sempre a Rock & Rollar)
- Blitz - Os Melhores de 97 (1998) - Eu Sou o Anjo do Desespero
- Portugal 98 (1998) - Canção da Revolta
- Expresso 25 Anos - Portugal Rock (1998) - Budapeste (Sempre a Rock & Rollar)
- XX Anos XX Bandas (1999) - Mãe (tribute to Xutos & Pontapés)
- Ama Romanta - Sempre! (1999) - Oub'lá
- Ar de Rock - Vinte Anos Depois (2000) - No Domingo Fui Às Antas (tribute album to Rui Veloso)
- Rock Sound Volume 8 (2003) - Escravos do Desejo
- Manifesto (2004) - Estilo and Berlim
- Rock Sound Volume 17 (2004) - Vertigem
- À Sombra de Deus Vol. 3 - Braga (2004) - Sobe, Querida, Desce
- 3 Pistas - Antena 3 (2005) - Fado Canibal and Kayatronic (original song by Corpo Diplomático)
- Lisboa@Com.Fusion.Com (2006) - Primavera de Destroços

=== DVD ===
- Müller No Hotel Hessischer Hof (2006)
- Maldoror (2008)
