= The Gilbert's Feed Band =

The Gilbert’s Feed Band
- Origin: Lisbon, Portugal
- Genres: Rock, Retro-rock, Ska, Crossover, Neo-swing, Funk rock
- Years active: 1988–1993; 1995–2003; 2008–present
- Labels: Guardians of Metal; Som Livre

The Gilbert's Feed Band (GFB) is a Portuguese alternative and crossover rock band. The band is known for their acrobatic performances, musical fusion and burlesque attitude. The band's attitude and lyrics are associated to radical sports. Their shows feature acrobatic acts and surprises like flips, acrobatic jumps, explosions, radical wheels and unicycles. The band call their musical style "Strambolic Circus Sound".

== Band history ==
=== 1988-1993 ===
Founded in 1988, the project, The Gilbert’s Feed Band, had its first stable formation with Magala (ex. Pissus Erectus, Atrofiados) on the guitar, Mario (vocals), Sérgio on the guitar and Roberto (Atrofiados) on the drums.

At the end of 1990, the band recorded their first demo tape. The demo, Radical Gilbert’s Feed Band Skatecore, was released in 1991 on Guardians of Metal with the help of bassist Pedro (Tropa Morta) and Edu from Dr. Zilch and Anjos on the keyboards. This demo with three tracks – For my Skate, Gilbert’s Party and We Gonna Show - sold out all copies. The band's music was labeled Skatecore because of the lyrics and the practice of skating by several members of the band. On that tape, the band merged hardcore metal with other styles like hip hop, rap, funk, punk rock, blues, southern hard rock, metal and Australian hard rock.

With the support from the Skate Club of Lisbon, the band received air-play and interviews in the underground radio scene. In 1992, the Brazilian multi-instrumentalist Hamilton “Rastas” Pernão of Os Cabelo Duro joined the band as bass player, trumpetist, percussionist and rapper.

In 1993, in spite of a promising start with more and more concerts, the band stopped playing after several members joined the Portuguese army.

Magala and Natcho joined Ian's project and started a new band called Los Tomatoes.

=== 1995-2003 ===
In 1995, almost two years later, The Gilbert’s returned with a new set of musicians: with Mario, Sérgio, and Magala - now on the trumpet - and the newcomers Dr. T on the keyboards, Zé Luis on the bass, Ruizão on the saxophone and half pipe Portuguese top skater Calota on the drums. The Hardcore attitude of early years was increased with this new formation that gave GFB the “big-band strambolic sound and look”.

In 1996, they recorded a second demo tape named The Gilbert’s Feed Band Presents An Orchestration Of The Fragles Au Vaudeville. This demo was a collaboration with Susan “Punk”(from Portuguese Hardcore band (Colestrol) and her sister Claudia. This demo showed a mature band with high velocity style but now mixing strange and unusual styles.

In 1997, veteran Sérgio left the band and Pedrocas became the new guitar player. GFB played many concerts this year – one of the most remarkable one was at IST Super-Arraial 97 (with Portuguese bands Ena Pá 2000 and Xutos & Pontapés) to an estimated audience of 20,000 fans.

Rising in popularity and requested by many newspapers and radio shows, the band faced internal conflicts, as some musicians defended a more experimental type of music. That, and other reasons, also contributed to the exit of Pedrocas, Zé Luís and drummer Calota by the end of the year.

At the end of 1997 into early 1998 assisted to the brief appearance of Mergulhão on the drums and then by Patrick Pretorius (former drummer of band Search in Italy). Alex, first, and Sergovski, later, played the bass and Perdigone became the new guitarist. Big “Bad” Johnny joined, playing the trombone. The band celebrated 10 years of their career with the release of three old songs on CD-R. Rui “Corrosão Caótica” on the percussion made a special appearance at the “10 years” celebration concert in a Lisbon club. Sergovski went to Spain and “Dread” Mané took his place on bass. The band was invited to TV shows and to play at the Expo '98.

Ruizão decided to leave the band and Mata “The Killer” got the saxophone.

In 1999, GFB played in many clubs and open-air concerts. The band started the pre-production of a CD called The Album.

The recording sessions for The Album started in February 2000. Guest musicians for this album included Ian and many others. The Gilbert’s Feed Band now focused on studio work. A couple of concerts in Lisbon were the exception. The Album, a not officially copyrighted CD, was then distributed by Gilbert's Funclub hand to hand and by mail to fans.

From 1998 to 2003, the usual line-up was: crooner: Mr. Mariofsky; trumpet: Magala; trombone: Big “Bad” Johnny; saxophone: Mata ”The Killer”; keyboards: Dr. T; guitar: Perdigone; bass: Mané “Dread”; drums: Patrick Pretorius; percussions: Leo “Leone”.

In late 2002 and early 2003, the band was changed again: Dr. T left to make a PhD in medicine in Sweden and Diogo Sottomayor got the Keyboards. Patrick also left and started his own Italian food business, Espanhol got the drums. Perdigone left the band to concentrate on university work, Johnny “Surf” Stevens took over the guitars. Mata “The Killer” left the band, Mr. Mariofsky left the band because of musical divergences to assume leadership of his own project, a band called Moremad.

In 2003, The Gilbert’s Feed Band appeared with a new line-up: crooner: Espanhol (from the Drums); bass: Jorge Serigado; keyboards: Klaudio “Kaius Circensis”; trumpet: Magala; trombone: Big “Bad” Johnny; saxophone: Miguel Varsóvias; clarinet and saxophone: Luis Bastos; drums: Nelson Caetano.

After some gigs and with a number of confirmed shows, Espanhol stopped to be the crooner of the band for personal reasons.

After this cutting act the band stopped their activities, playing in a last Gilbert’s show with invited friends:

- crooner: Ian Mucznick (long time Magala’s friend and singer/mentor of Los Tomatoes)
- trumpet: Magala
- trombone: Big “Bad” Johnny
- saxophone: André Barbosa
- clarinet: Luis Bastos
- guitar: Johnny “Surf” Stevens
- keyboard: Klaudio “Kaius Circensis”
- drums: Nelson Caetano
- bass: João
- percussions: Patrick Pretorius
- percussions and Tenor vocals (on Lover’s Forever and Krrk): Espanhol.

Magala, Big "Bad" Johnny and Mata "The Killer" then joined Primitive Reason.

=== 2008-present ===
In 2008, after 5 years, The Gilbert’s Feed Band reunited to record a song for a compilation CD called A Nossa Selecção. The goal was to support the Portugal national football team to win the UEFA Euro 2008.

The band was: crooner, keyboards and percussion: Mr. Benfas; bass: Big “Bad” Johnny; guitar: Johnny “Surf” Stevens; trumpet: Magala; Tenor Saxophone: Mata,”The Killer”; drums: Danny ”The Animal” Boy. This song was recorded together with Portuguese guitar player Paulo Garcês.

In 2009, the band returned to stages with new members and a new album with several collaborations was recorded: the actress Catarina Wallenstein sings in duet on Lovers Forever, ”MoreMad” Mariofsky sings on Radio Song, a song was written by Dr. T (originally called American Way of Life) and the band cooperated with various other musicians.

The band then prepared the release of their album for 2009, but recent information suggests the launching only in 2010. On February 16, 2010 The Gilbert's Feed Band was invited to close the great carnival parade of Lisbon at Praça do Rossio.

== Current members ==
- Mr. Benfas "The Atomic Locust" - crooner, Handsaw, Illusions
- Monsieur Jean Mark Charmier - trumpet
- Magala - trombone
- Mata "The Killer" - saxophone
- Gonças: Clarinets - saxophone
- Johnny “Surf” Stevens - guitar
- Pinetree -keyboards
- Ramon - bass
- Danny "Animal" Boy - drums
- Gilbert's Strambolic Crew Boris and Manaças "Sorriso e Meio" - Special Live Surprises

== Former members ==
- Mister MD - vocals, acrobat
- Sérgio "Cenoura" - guitar
- Roberto - drums
- Dr. T - Keyboards
- Nelsun Caetano - drums
- Mané Dread Rasta - bass
- Jorge Serigado - bass
- Varsovias - saxophone
- Luis Bastos - clarinet
- Kaius Circencis - keyboards
- Pernão - bass, trumpet, percussion, rap vocals
- Ze Luis - bass
- Calota - drums
- Español - drums / vocals
- Ian Mucznick - vocals
- Cabare da Cocha Drum Master - drums
- Ruizofski - saxophone
- Perdiguini - guitar
- Mergulhão - drums
- Leo Leone - percussion
- André Barbosa - sax
- Alex - bass
- Sérgio - bass
- Ruizão - percussion
- Diogo Sottomayor - teclados
- Pedrocas – guitar

== Discography ==
Title	Date	Label
The Radical Gilbert's Feed Band Skatecore	1991	Guardians of Metal
The Gilbert's Feed Band presents an Orchestration of The Fragles au Vaudeville	1996	self-release
10 Years of The Gilbert's Feed Band	1998	self-release
The Album	2000	self-release
A Nossa Selecção (Compilação com Vários Artistas) - Alma Lusa	2008	Som Livre
The Flabbergasting Return of The Grand Strambolic Circus	2010	
