= Adolfo Luxúria Canibal =

Portuguese musician and lawyer

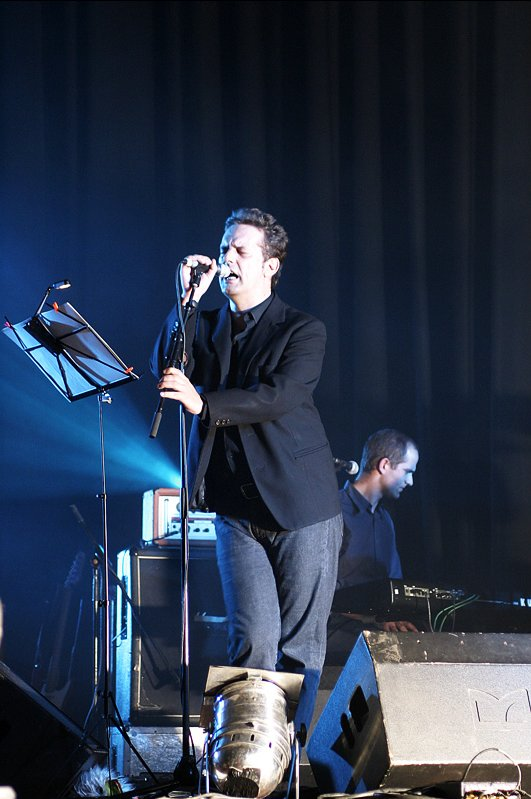
- Adolfo Luxúria Canibal performing with Mão Morta 4 August 2005

Background information
- Born: Adolfo Morais de Macedo
- Origin: Luanda, Angola
- Genres: Rock, electronic noise
- Occupations: Musician, Lawyer
- Instrument: Vocals

Adolfo Luxúria Canibal (meaning Adolph Cannibal Lust) is the stage name of Adolfo Morais de Macedo. He was born in 1959 in Luanda, Angola. Canibal is a Portuguese musician and lawyer, known for his vocals in both the Portuguese rock band Mão Morta and trans-national electronic noise band Mécanosphère.
