= Rui Penha =

Portuguese musician (born 1981)

- Born: October 16, 1981 (age 44); Porto, Portugal
- Scientific career
- Fields: Music
- Workplaces: Casa da Música; Aveiro University

Rui Penha (born October 16, 1981) is a Portuguese musician, composer and conductor.

== Life ==
Penha was born in Porto on October 16, 1981. He received his first musical education at the age of six, studying piano and harpsichord. In 2006, he graduated in Music Education and Composition from the University of Aveiro, where he studied under Sara Carvalho and João Pedro Oliveira. He has also studied with Emmanuel Nunes, Pedro Amaral, Brian Ferneyhough, Helmut Lachenmann, Louis Andriessen, Martijn Padding, Flo Menezes and Mary Finsterer, among others, participating actively in several Workshops and Master Classes. In 2007, he began his doctoral research under João Pedro Oliveira, with a scholarship from the University of Aveiro.

== Studies ==
Rui studied conducting with Ralph Allwood, Mike Brewer, Péter Erdei and Jean-Sébastien Béreau, among others. He was the conductor of the contemporary ensemble Momentum Ensemble, with whom he premièred and recorded works of some of Portugal’s foremost composers. As a performer, he is now mainly an interpreter of live electroacoustic music, both as a soloist and in chamber music.

== Career ==
Rui was awarded some prizes, including the 1st prize in the Prémio Nacional de Composição Jorge Peixinho, in 2003, and an honorable mention in the Concurso de Composição Música Viva, in 2004. He was selected for the Workshop Orquestra Gulbenkian para Jovens Compositores Portugueses, in 2004 and 2005, and for the Young Composers’ Meeting 2007, in the Netherlands.

Rui has composed music for cinema, institutional television, radio and interactive installations. He has been invited as a speaker in several conferences and as active participant in some international symposiums, being also a programmer of musical software. He was awarded a mention for the whole of the pedagogical work in the Lomus 2008 – International Music Software Contest.

His works have been played in several countries, by some foremost groups, as the Arditti Quartet, Orquestra Gulbenkian and Orkest 'de ereprijs', and soloists, as Pedro Carneiro and Adam Wodnicki, in some important festivals, as Música Viva (Lisbon), Archipel (Geneve) and Musincanto (Turin). Some of his works have been published, both in scores and CDs.

He teaches at the Department of Communication and Art of the University of Aveiro and he is also a consultant of the Education Service at Casa da Música (Porto).

== Publications ==
Discography

- Penha, R. (2010) "obra com título longo*" (performed by Performa Ensemble), Momentum, Phonedition: track 6
- Penha, R. (2010) "Perspective" (performed by Arditti Quartet and Pedro Carneiro), Spiral of Light: Portuguese Music for Strings and Marimba, etcetera records: tracks 6-9
- Penha, R. (2008) "Calcinatio" (performed by Momentum Ensemble), Música Contemporânea, Numérica: track 4
- Penha, R. (2005) "Calcinatio" (performed by Momentum Ensemble), Águas furtadas – Literatura, Música e Artes Visuais, 8: track 4

Scores

- Penha, R. (2005) "Calcinatio", Águas furtadas – Literatura, Música e Artes Visuais, 8: 290-305
- Penha, R. (2003) dhamara agni. Aveiro: Universidade de Aveiro

Magazine articles

- Penha, R. (2009) "Digitópia @ Future Places 2008", I am a Future Place, Future Places 2008 Festival Proceedings, Porto.
- Penha, R. (2008) "Narrativas Sonoras | Políssonos | Digitópia", EASI – Revista Annual de Som e Imagem, Escola de Artes da Universidade Católica Portuguesa, Porto.

Papers in conferences

- Penha, R. and Rodrigues, P. (2011) "Live electroacoustic music performance in the contemporary classical realm", Proceedings of Performa 2011, Aveiro.
- Gehlhaar, R., Rodrigues, P., Girão, L. and Penha, R. (2010) "Instruments for Everyone", Proceedings of Digital Resources for the Humanities and Arts 2010, London.
- Penha, R. (2009) "Towards a free, open source and cross-platform software suite for approaching music and sound design", Research, Reflections and Innovations in Integrating ICT in Education, Lisbon.
- Penha, R., Lopes, F., Peixoto, N., Miguel, D., Branco, J., Gomes, J. A. and Rodrigues, P. M. (2009) "Developing musical skills at Digitópia", Research, Reflections and Innovations in Integrating ICT in Education, Lisbon.
- Rodrigues, P. M., Lopes, F., Almeida, A. P., Peixoto, N., Mónica, M., Branco, J., Neto, P. J., Gomes, J. A., and Penha, R. (2009) "How Computers shape Educational Activities at Casa da Música", Research, Reflections and Innovations in Integrating ICT in Education, Lisbon.
- Penha, R., Rodrigues, P. M., Gouyon, F., Martins, L. G., Guedes, C. and Barbosa, A. (2008) "Digitópia – Platform for the Development of Digital Music Communities", Proceedings of Digital Resources for the Humanities and Arts 2008, Cambridge.
- Penha, R. (2008) "Distance encoding in Ambisonics using three angular coordinates", Proceedings of the Sound and Music Computing Conference 2008, Berlin.
- Penha, R., Rodrigues, P. M., Gouyon, F., Martins, L. G., Guedes, C. and Barbosa, A. (2008) "Studio Report: Digitópia at Casa da Música", Proceedings of the International Computer Music Conference 2008, Belfast.
- Pereira, F., Reis, J., Penha, R., Leal, N. & Ramos, I. (2006) Criatividade Musical e Novas Tecnologias. In: Pereira, M., Alegre, M. & Pereira, M. (eds.). Prática Pedagógica Supervisionada 2005/2006 – Encontro de Formação, Troca de Experiências. Centro Integrado de Formação de Professores, Aveiro.

Panels and oral presentations

- 2010 "Portefólio Pessoal" · Escola Superior de Artes Applicadas do Instituto Politécnico de Castelo Branco
- 2010 "Portefólio Pessoal" · GEAR – 1st Workshop for Practice Based Research in Art and Design · Universidade da Beira Interior
- 2010 "Codificação do parâmetro Distância num campo sonoro Ambisonics" · 1o Fórum Internacional de Pós-graduação em Estudos de Música e Dança · Universidade de Aveiro
- 2009 "Digitópia" · IV Encontro de Comunicação e Design Multimédia · Escola Superior de Educação do Instituto Politécnico de Coimbra
- 2009 "Software musical para síntese, processamento de som e interacção em tempo real" · 10o Encontro de Engenharia de Áudio da AES Portugal · Instituto Superior de Engenharia de Lisboa
- 2009 "Digitópia" · Escola de Artes da Universidade Católica Portuguesa 2008 "Digitópia" · Faculdade de Engenharia da Universidade do Porto
- 2008 "Digitópia" · Instituto Superior de Engenharia do Porto
- 2008 "Um ano de Digitópia" · Casa da Música, Porto
- 2008 "Ao Alcance de Todos – Música, Tecnologia e Necessidades Especiais: Montra de Projectos" · Casa da Música, Porto
- 2008 "Digitópia" · Universidade do Minho, Braga
- 2007 "T de Timbre", Breve Dicionário de Ouvir · Casa da Música, Porto
- 2007 "Work in Action", Mapa: Metamapa · Universidade de Aveiro
- 2007 "C de Computador", Breve Dicionário de Ouvir · Casa da Música, Porto
- 2006 "Collaborative Performance Technology Workshop" · Cambridge University
- 2004 "Edição Digital de Partituras" · Conservatório de Música do Porto
