= German Fetish Ball =

Fetish exhibition held in Germany

The German Fetish Ball
- Begins: May 5, 2027
- Ends: May 9, 2027
- Frequency: Annually
- Locations: Berlin, Germany
- Inaugurated: 2003
- Website: www.german-fetish-ball.de/en/

The German Fetish Ball or German Fetish Fair & BDSM Convention is an annual fetish exhibition held in Germany, and known as well under the acronym GFB. The fair has been running since 2003 and has been held in Berlin, then in Hamburg, and now back in Berlin. The festival lasts for three days over the weekend of Pentecost, and includes both parties and merchandise exhibits with more than 2,000 guests. The Fetish Fair is the largest fetish weekend in Germany, and one of the world's largest fetish trade shows. Some international attendees make a special trip.

== Mistresses of Ceremony ==
- 2026: Dolly Dyson and Ruby Alexia
- 2025:
- 2024:
- 2023: Dea Levina
- 2022: Eva Oh
- 2021: (Event cancelled)
- 2020: Leigh Hutchinson (Event cancelled)
- 2019: Leigh Hutchinson
- 2018: Myriel Monastic
- 2017: Kari Berg
- 2016: Ancilla Tilia
- 2015:
- 2014: Kari Berg
- 2013:
- 2012: Kari Berg
- 2011:
- 2010:
- 2009: Tronicat la Miez
- 2008: RubberDoll
- 2007: Ancilla Tilia
- 2006:
- 2005: Emily Marilyn
- 2004: Luci van Org
