= Droban-Apherna =

Portuguese instrumental experimental music band

Droban Apherna
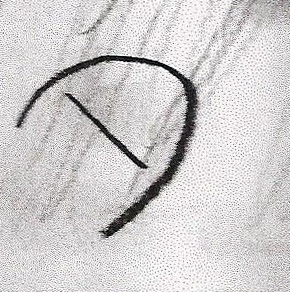
- Droban Apherna's presumed logotype

Background information
- Also known as: Estes
- Origin: Silves, Portugal
- Genres: experimental music, fusion
- Years active: 2008-present
- Label: Independent
- Members: Pedro Calquinha, André Marques, Samuel Silva
- Website: droban-apherna.blogspot.com

Droban-Apherna is a Portuguese instrumental experimental music band from Silves, in Portugal and it was created in late 2008, being originally called "Estes". The music style is sometimes labeled by some as fusion due to the wide range of styles that are played throughout the albums and even throughout the course of the same song.

The band was originally formed by Pedro Calquinha (keyboard and guitar) and André Marques (bass guitar), although both play several other instruments on the band's albums, such as percussion, bouzouki, mandolin, flute and synthesizers.

The band has so far released four studio albums: Bufus Dei (2010), Ablun Malüss 108 (2011), Drubahaal (2011) and An Evening With Droban-Apherna. All albums were recorded, mixed and mastered by the band members themselves and are available for free at the band's blog.

After the release of Drubahaal, the drummer Samuel Silva joined the band, and worked in the composing and recording stage of the fourth album, An Evening With Droban-Apherna.

== Bufus Dei (2010) ==
Bufus Dei is the first album of the band, and consisted in a mix of drums, electric guitar and electric bass almost exclusively. It is a concept album divided into 12 tracks, with the full length of 44 minutes and 22 seconds. The predominant musical genres in this album is funk, rock, jazz and metal.

== Ablun Malüss 108 (2011) ==
Ablun Malüss 108 is also a concept album as Bufus Dei. However, this album goes way beyond the first one in terms of experimentation. The album was divided into 99 tracks, consisting in musical sentences and excerpts, and dense ambient created by the diverse orchestration used throughout the full length of the album (48 minutes and 57 seconds). Although some tracks contain lyrics and speeches, Ablun Malüss 108 is an instrumental album, mixing musical genres such as funk, rock, folk, ethnic, jazz, tango, blues, and many others.

Droban-Apherna also start to expand their orchestration in this album, using keyboards, various percussion, flutes, bouzouki, mandolin, kazoo, melodica and the usual bass, guitar and drums.

== Drubahaal (2011) ==
Drubahaal is the third studio album by Droban-Apherna, released in late October 2011. The theme of video games is explored throughout the album, and the tracks are not united or "glued" like in the previous works. The full-length of Drubahaal is of 43 minutes and 52 seconds, divided into 12 tracks, and the orchestration used was mainly electric bass (fretted and fretless), electric keyboards, MIDI keyboards and drum sequencing, though there are certain bits of voices in track 9 and an electric guitar solo in track 7. This was also the first album where Droban-Apherna made videoclips. Using the videogame Minecraft, they used each track as a chapter of a movie based on the 2012 phenomenon.
