= Holy Nothing =

Portuguese electronic band

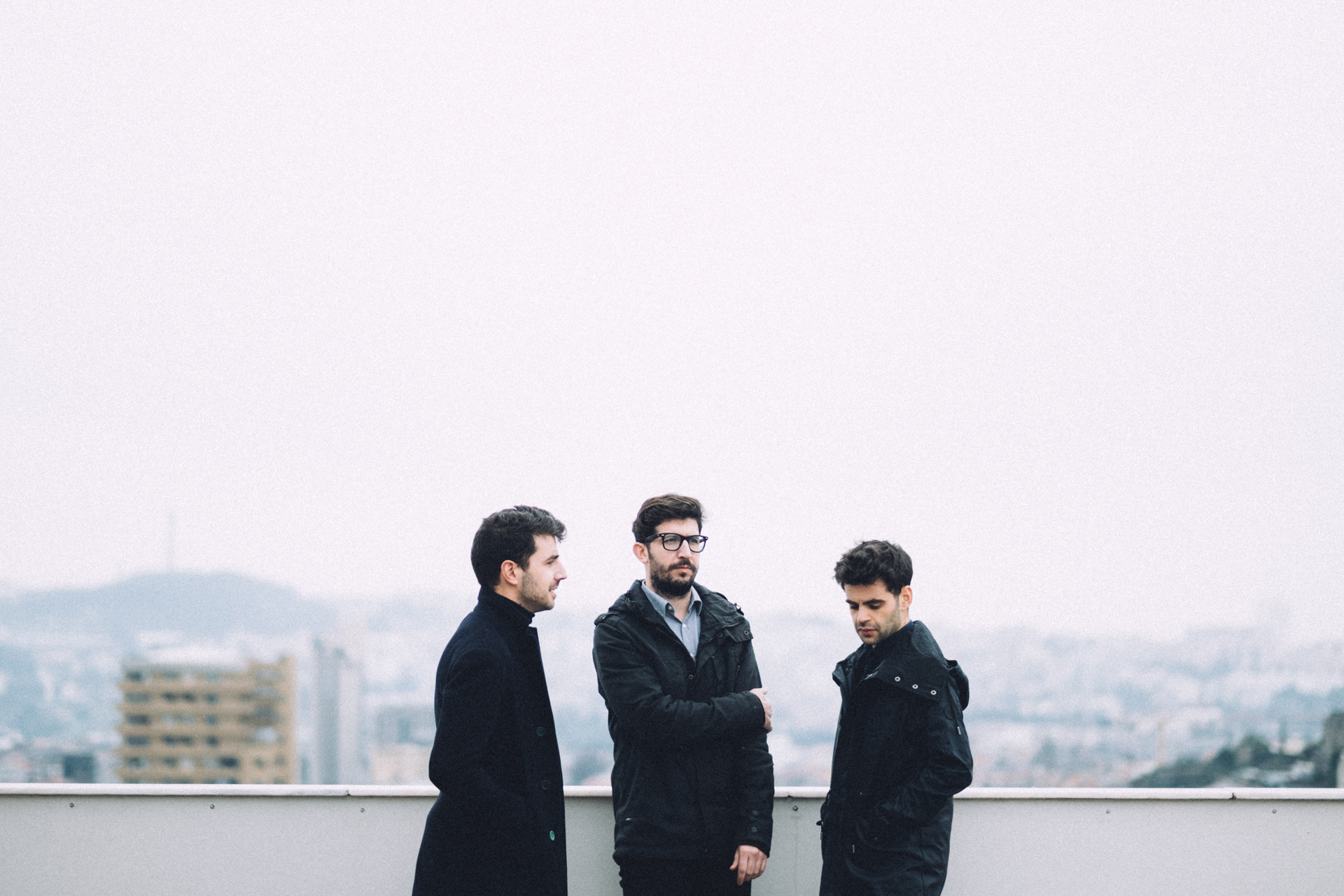

Background information
- Origin: Portugal
- Genres: Electronic Music; Experimental
- Years active: 2013–present
- Labels: Turbina
- Members: Pedro Rodrigues; Nelson Silva; Samuel Gonçalves
- Website: holynothing.bandcamp.com

Holy Nothing is a Portuguese electronic band formed in the city of Porto, in 2013 by Pedro Rodrigues, Nelson Silva and Samuel Gonçalves. With two albums and one EP released, the trio mixes tropical rhythms with industrial sounds, synthesizers and groove boxes in their music production, generating an unconventional electronic sound.

The trio became friends while living in the city of Porto, Portugal, but at the beginning of the band, all three members were in different places: Nelson Silva was in Porto, Pedro Rodrigues in the Netherlands and Samuel Gonçalves in Chile, having done the initial musical work together via the internet. In 2013, they released the first singles from the project: "Given Up" and "Nothing is Fun", which preceded the release of their first EP Boundaries (2014), the result of musical mockups produced in the period which were separated.

In 2015, the band debuted with the first LP: Hypertext. The critically acclaimed album was responsible for placing Holy Nothing on the lineup of major festivals around the world, such as SXSW (2016), Eurosonic (2017) and Waves Vienna and Iceland Airwaves, both in 2018. Besides the international performances, the trio also played in all major Portuguese music festivals, such as NOS Primavera Sound, Vodafone Paredes de Coura, and others.

The live performances of the band are enriched with the visual arts and the light design of the Portuguese artists Bruno Albuquerque, João Pessegueiro e Rui Monteiro. For 2019, they plan on releasing their second LP Plural Real Animal, an album marked by collaboration with Brazilian and Portuguese artists such as BaianaSystem and Moullinex.

== Band members ==
- Pedro Rodrigues: vocals and groovebox
- Samuel Gonçalves: bass and drum pad
- Nelson Silva: synth and drum pad

== Discography ==
=== EP ===
- Boundaries (2014)

=== LPs ===
- Hypertext (2015)
- Plural Real Animal (2019)

=== Singles ===
- "Given Up" (2013)
- "Nothing is Fun" (2013)
- "Speed of Sound" (2017)
- "Home" (featuring Muhaisnah Four) (2017)
- "Underdog" (2018)
