= Anarchicks =

Portuguese rock band

- Anarchicks in 2026 (from left to right) Katari, Adam, Inóspita, Rita Sedas, and Synthetique.

Background information
- Origin: Lisbon, Portugal
- Genres: Rock, pop, riot grrrl
- Years active: 2011 - present
- Members: Rita Sedas (vocals); Synthetique (bass guitar); Katari (drums); Inóspita (electric guitar); Adam d'Armada Moreira (electric guitar)
- Past members: Priscila Devesa (vocals) (2011-2013); Marta Lefay (vocals) (2013-2017); Mariana Rosa (electric guitar) (2020-2023)
- Website: anarchicks.pt

Anarchicks is a Portuguese punk rock and pop band formed in Greater Lisbon. They were founded in 2011, and their core lineup has changed since. Their current line-up is composed of drummer Katari, vocalist Rita Sedas, guitarist Inês Matos and bassist Synthetique.

== Career ==
Anarchicks was formed in 2011 with Priscila Devesa on lead vocals accompanied by guitarist Adam d'Armada Moreira, bassist Synthetique, and drummer Katari. The lyrical focus of the band is said to be based around feminism and creative freedom. The band released their first 4-song EP Look What You Made Me Do, recorded and produced by Makoto Yagyu, in 2012.

The band's music was first played on the national radio program Indiegente in 2012, an influential alternative music show that has been broadcast on Antena 3 since the mid-1990s. The disc jockey and presenter of the program, Nuno Calado, played the song Forever, which would later feature on the band's first full-length album Really?!.

Really?! received some media attention, and the band was approached several times to perform on live TV, including an interview on the news broadcast of the public television channel RTP for International Women's Day on March 8, 2013. The popularity of the group continued to increase through the sale of their debut album and accompanying video clips, which also showcased an affinity for the alternative art and design scene of Lisbon. The group also continued to gain popularity through their energetic live TV performances and concerts, in which the quartet performed in unusual locations, such as buses of Carris during the Vodafone Mexefest in Lisbon 2012, and, in April 2013, by the open windows of an insurance building on Avenida dos Aliados, the main boulevard of Porto.

They played at the Super Bock Super Rock festival in 2013 as the opening band on the Super Bock stage, opening for Azealia Banks, Johnny Marr and the Arctic Monkeys. Shortly after performing at Super Bock Super Rock, vocalist Priscila Devesa left the band and was replaced by Marta Lefay. During Lefay’s tenure the group released the EP We Claim the Right in late 2015 and the second studio album We Claim the Right to Rebel and Resist in 2016. With this line-up, Anarchicks performed several times abroad, particularly in France, for example with Peaches in Le Havre, where they performed a cover of The Beatles Helter Skelter together on stage. On International Women's Day 2014, they were invited to perform in Paris at Le Machine du Moulin Rouge as part of the celebrations for that day. Anarchicks has also played with foreign bands in Portugal, such as the Brazilian band Cansei de Ser Sexy and the Berlin powerpop band The Not Amused.

The digital EP Vive la Ressonance followed in 2017, accompanied by the single "Black Box". That same year Lefay left amicably, and Rita Sedas became the new vocalist. With Sedas on vocals, the band released the single "No Friend" in 2018 as a preview of their next record. Anarchicks’ third studio album, Loose Ends, was released on 17 April 2019. The album includes the track Marianne, credited as "ft. Mariana Rosa". Rosa, who was part of the live line-up in 2016, then became the official guitarist of the band, replacing Moreira who moved abroad. In 2021 the group returned with the single No Freedom Under Fascist Rules., followed by the single Dare to Think in 2022.

In 2023, Inês Matos took Rosa’s position as the band’s guitarist alongside Sedas, Synthetique, and Katari, forming the band’s most recent line-up.

== Musical style ==
They see themselves as members of the riot grrrl movement and have incorporated various musical styles into their act including punk, pop, rock and new wave.

== Discography ==
=== Studio albums ===
- 2013: Really?!
- 2016: We Claim the Right to Rebel and Resist
- 2019: Loose Ends

=== Digital EPs ===
- 2012: Look What You Made Me Do
- 2015: We Claim the Right
- 2017: Vive La Ressonance
