= Rock Rendez-Vous =

Night club in Portugal

Coordinates: 38.743156°N 9.157533°W

Rock Rendez-Vous (also known as simply RRV) was one of the best known nightclubs in Lisbon, Portugal during the 1980s and early 1990s. It's regarded as one of the most important music venues for rock music in Portugal during the 80s. It was located at the ancient Universal cinema place, at the Rua de Beneficência ao Rego. The opening act, in 1980, 18 December was Rui Veloso.
RRV was closed in 1983, but a petition was made to reopen the club.
RRV promoted concerts of foreign acts like Teardrop Explodes, Killing Joke, The Chameleons, Danse Society, The Raincoats, The Sound and The Lords of the New Church. In 1984, RRV promoted the 1st Modern Music Contest (1º Concurso de Música Moderna), which achieved huge success among Portuguese bands, and had 7 editions (from 1984 to 1989 and 1994 with RTP support). After 1984 1st Modern Music Contest (1º Concurso de Música Moderna), it was created the record label Dansa do Som.
