= UHF (Portuguese band) =

Portuguese rock band

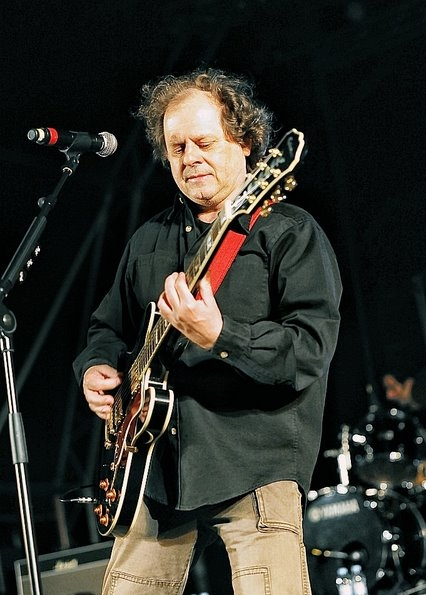
A. M. Ribeiro

UHF is a Portuguese rock band formed in the late 1970s in Almada by António Manuel Ribeiro (vocals, guitar and keyboard), Renato Gomes (guitar), Carlos Peres (bass) and Zé Carvalho (drums).

They were the driving force behind the Portuguese rock boom of the early 1980s. At this time very few rock bands had success singing in Portuguese.

UHF already had released their first single, "Jorge morreu" ("George died"), about a death by overdose, when Rui Veloso, considered by many people as "the father of Portuguese rock", released his monumental first album Ar de rock ("Air of Rock", a pun on "hard rock", which is how it sounds in Portuguese). After Veloso's success, a second single, "Cavalos de corrida" ("Racing horses"), was released, followed by three very successful albums in Portugal: À flor da pele, Estou de passagem, and Persona non grata. The group has celebrated 35 years of existence in 2014, with the only member from the original formation being António Manuel Ribeiro, the leader and frontman of the band, and considered to be one of the best rock poets in the history of Portuguese Rock.

== History ==
In 1976, while punk rock captivated England and the United States, Portugal sought to adjust to the newly gained freedom with the April revolution. Rock was seen by young people as a counterculture movement, an escape from the dictatorial principles of the Salazar regime. Rock was synonymous of freedom, a musical language without connection to the past. The UHF were among the first to quench an immense rock thirst in this new social and political reality. António Manuel Ribeiro (voice and guitar), Carlos Peres (bass), Alfredo Antunes (drums) and a Brazilian guitarist formed in 1976, in Almada, a cover band called Purple Legion that played on the dance circuit, of the time because the rock that was made in the world was little publicized in the press and the radio. At the end of 1977, the drummer Américo Manuel joined Carlos Peres and António M. Ribeiro and started the compositions of the author. They changed the name of the band to Flower of the Skin and later, already with Renato Gomes in the guitar, for UHF. The process of evolution of the name of the band was explained by the singer:

"Flor da Pele" was too big a name, psychedelic and devoid of the sense of the immediate times that were lived in music ... Back home when the black and white television cable failed again and I went to give the magic touch, I stopped in the fraction of a second that gives rise to the idea when I fixed the two entrances in the rear of the device: VHF and UHF.

The difficulties of that time were tremendous, because there were no rooms and there was no circuit of shows where the groups could be shown. The country was awakening from an enormous social apathy suffocated by years of isolation. The media reproduced some yé yé, the slight song, the fado, the national songóntismo and after 1974 prevailed the song of political intervention, as recalled Tozé Brito, former representative of Portuguese PolyGram: "After the revolution, who was not in the area of political song had nowhere to go. " Rock was regarded as a joke for boys in high school, which quickly diluted with the call for incorporation into the troop. Portugal could not evolve, too, culturally.

In early November 1978, they performed their first concert at Bar É, in Lisbon, playing the first part of the Sparks. In this concert they invited Vitor 'Macaco' - a Lisnave workman with a pint to give a show - to take on vocalization, but he would be in the band for a short time. António M. Ribeiro occupied only the rhythm guitar and choirs and only later he would assume the role of vocalist. In the audience, the radio broadcaster António Sérgio, an attentive observer, was enthusiastic about the underground sound of the UHF. The second concert took place at the Brown's nightclub in Lisbon, on November 18, 1978, in the first part of Aqui d'el-Rock. This is the official anniversary date considered by the UHF because it was the first concert with António M. Ribeiro in the lead voice. It was a pragmatic performance, as he later recalled: "I do not know if it was the timidity or the lack of sound rehearsal, but we played so loud and so fast and I screamed so much that we smothered our palms with a new song." The musicians lived in Almada and their travels to the capital were limited to the transportation schedules that made crossing the Tagus River. In order not to lose the last cacilheiro when returning home, it was necessary the fast exit after the concerts, being known like "the dudes of Almada that arrive, touch and disappear".

On June 3, 1979, they made their debut in big events, in what was the eleventh concert of the band, with the participation in the "Festival Antinuclear - By the Sun", held in Edward VII Park, where they played other names like Rão Kyao, Pedro Barroso, Vitorino, Fausto, Trovante, Minas & Traps, among others. On August 6 and 7 the UHF played in Vila Viçosa with another guitar player, Alfredo Pereira, who left for a more consistent project, but its passage was brief. Mines & Pitfalls - which caused an affront to local convictions - and the promising Xutos & Pontapés (ex-Beijinhos e Parabéns), still lacking media projection, were only able to get the first record in 1982.

In the spring of 1979 they were invited to record by the small publisher Metro-Som, similar to what had happened with the Aqui d'el-Rock. Even without a signed contract they released, in October of that year, the extended play Jorge Morreu (1979), a social intervention disc composed of three tracks that did not obtain commercial success. The publisher did not promote its bands on the radio or in the press. The rock sung in Portuguese still catted but needed to be released. Unhappy with the situation, they contacted the multinational PolyGram but the direction of the publisher, at the time, still did not go through the national rock. In 1979 already traveled Portugal from north to south, achieving the unprecedented feat of a complete national tour. The reputation was consolidated in multiple concerts, first in the great Lisbon and later throughout the country. They were one of the few bands chosen to make the first part of artists of international reputation, case of Dr. Feelgood with two consecutive concerts to 18 and 19 of September in the Dramatic of Cascais, and the new wave king, Elvis Costello, with Attractions, on the 15th in the Infante de Sagres pavilion in Oporto, and on December 17 and 18 in the Os Belenenses pavilion in Lisbon. The UHF acquired the status of 'live band' in the press, but went unnoticed to the editors, who did not leave the offices to see new live bands. The written language of rock in Portuguese, direct and spontaneous, arrived for the first time to all the places of Portugal. The daring Musicians of Almada began to make the real radiography of the life of the urban young people, speaking of the migratory flows, marginality, prostitution, hard drugs and the hard work in the Lisnave. They embodied the experience of 'being on the sidelines' and some rock orthodoxy inspired by the Doors and Lou Reed.

== Discography ==
Studio Albums

- 1981 – À Flor Da Pele
- 1982 – Persona non grata
- 1983 - Ares e Bares de Fronteira
- 1988 - Em Lugares Incertos
- 1990 - Este Filme / Amélia Recruta
- 1990 - Julho, 13
- 1991 - Comédia Humana
- 1993 - Santa Loucura
- 1996 - 69 Stereo
- 1998 - Rock É! (dançando na noite)
- 2003 – Sou Benfica - As Canções da Águia
- 2003 - Harley Jack (CD, Am.Ra, 2003)
- 2003 - La Pop End Rock
- 2004 - Voltei a Porto Moniz (Am.Ra, 2004)
- 2004 - Podia Ser Natal (Am.Ra, 2004)
- 2005 - Há Rock no Cais
- 2009 - Eu Sou Benfica
- 2010 - Porquê?
- 2013 - A Minha Geração

Compilations

- 1996 - Cavalos de Corrida
- 1999 – Eternamente
- 2003 – À Beira do Tejo
- 2014 - 300 Canções

== Members ==
=== Current members ===
- António Manuel Ribeiro — Vocals, Guitars (1978–present)
- António Côrte-Real — Guitars, Acoustic Guitar (1997–present)
- Ivan Cristiano — Drums, Percussion, Backing Vocals (1999–present)
- Luís 'Cebola' Simões — Bass, Acoustic Bass, Backing Vocals (2008, 2013–present)
- Fernando Rodrigues — Bass, Backing Vocals (2000–2013), Keyboards, Backing Vocals (2015–present)

=== Past members ===
Guitars:

- Renato Gomes — Guitars (1978–1986)
- Rui Rodrigues — Guitars (1986–1990)
- Toninho — Guitars (1990–1992)
- Rui Dias — Guitars (1992–1994)
- Rui Padinha — Guitars (1996–1997)

Bass:

- Carlos Peres — Bass and Backing Vocals (1978–1983)
- José Matos — Bass (1983–1984)
- Fernando Deleare — Bass (1984–1986, 1987, 1993–1997)
- Xana Sin — Bass and Backing Vocals (1987–1988)
- Pedro Faro — Bass (1989–1990)
- Nuno Espírito Santo — Bass (1991–1992)
- Nuno Duarte — Bass (1997–1998)
- David Rossi — Bass and Backing Vocals (1998–2000)
- Fernando Rodrigues — Bass (2001–2013)
- Nuno Oliveira — Bass and Backing Vocals (2008–2015)

Drums:

- Américo Manuel — Drums (1978–1979)
- Zé Carvalho — Drums (1979–1984)
- Manuel Hippo — Drums (1984–1985)
- Rui 'Beat' Velez — Drums (1986–1987)
- Luís Espírito Santo — Drums (1987–1992, 1995–1997)
- Fernando Pinho — Drums (1993–1995)
- Marco Costa Cesário — Drums (1997–1999)

Keyboard and Saxophone:

- Renato Júnior — Keyboard and Saxophone (1989–1995)
- Jorge Manuel Costa — Keyboard and Saxophone (1996–2002)
- Nuno Oliveira - Keyboard and Saxophone (2008–2015)
