= Fingertips (band) =

Portuguese pop rock band

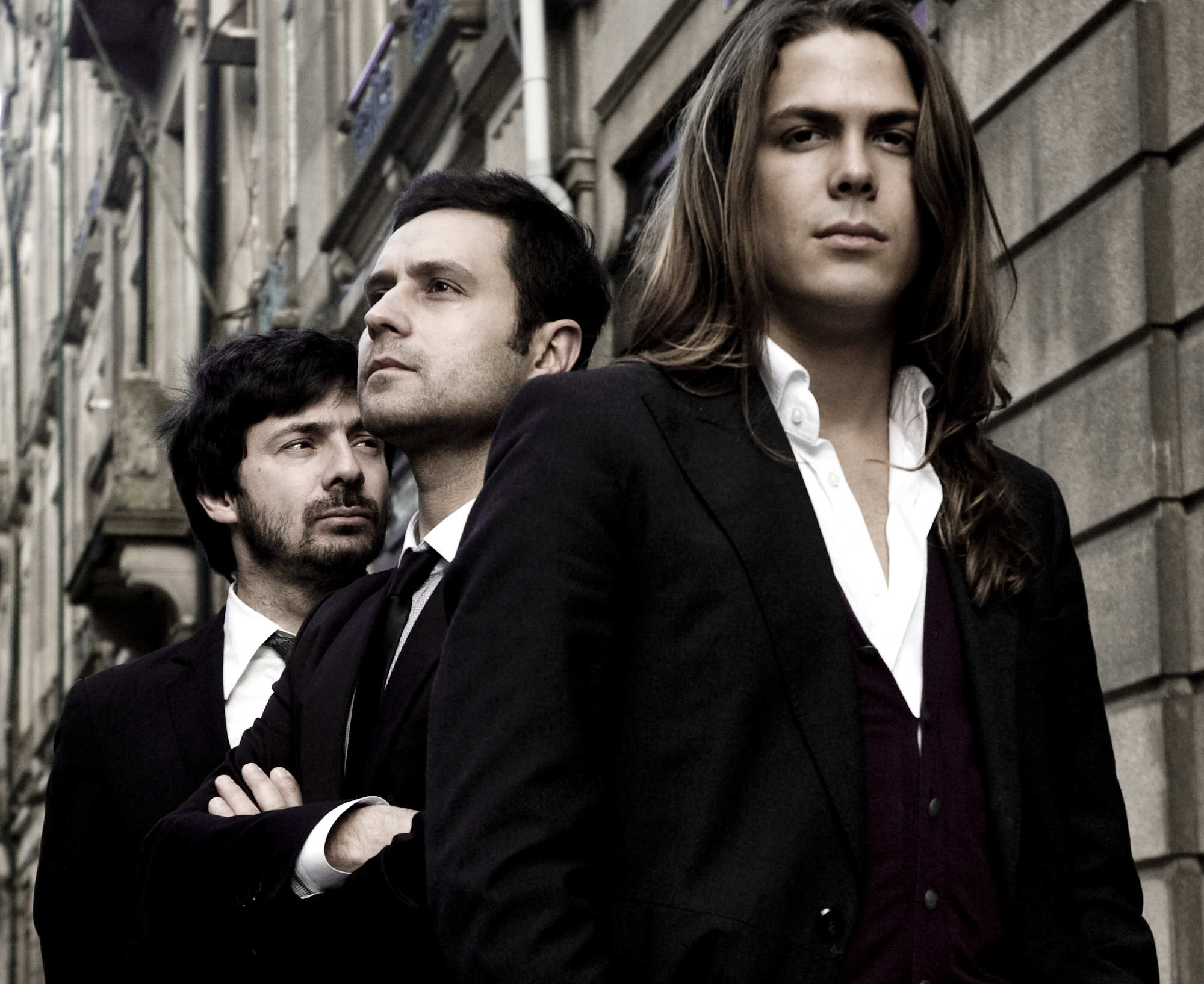
- From left to right: Jorge Oliveira, Rui Saraiva, Zé Manuel.

Background information
- Origin: Portugal
- Genre: Soft rock
- Years active: 2002–present
- Label: Metrosonic Records
- Members: Rui Saraiva; Zé Manuel
- Past members: See members section
- Website: thefingertips.com

Fingertips are a pop rock band from Portugal formed in 2002.

They launched their debut album All 'bout Smoke 'n Mirrors in 2003 with the first single Melancholic Ballad. Catharsis, their second album, released in 2006. The band also released the single Cause to Love You to much acclaim.

The band has performed in Rock in Rio Lisbon, Vilar Mouros Festival and in collaboration with Queen and Paul Rodgers, The Corrs, George Michael, Nelly Furtado and The Cure. By 2009, vocalist Zé Manuel had departed from the band.

In 2010, Fingertips chose Joana Gomes to be the new voice of the band. They released two albums, Venice (2011) and 2 (2012). In 2015, Fingertips traveled to Los Angeles. The city was where the band recorded at The Ballroom Studios and East West Studios with Mark Needham (Imagine Dragons, The Killers, Fleetwood Mac).

In 2018, Fingertips announced the return of vocalist Zé Manuel . They celebrated the 15th anniversary of their debut album with the single My Everyday.

== History ==
=== 2002–2009: Formation and early years ===
In March 2003, Fingertips' debut album, All Bout Smoke N' Mirrors, was released.

The lyrics were written by Zé Manuel, at 16 years old, with a poetic style in mind. The songs were composed by Rui Saraiva and Helder de Matos.

All 'Bout Smoke N' Mirrors was one of the biggest hits of 2003, with the songs Melancholic Ballad (For The Leftlovers) and How Do You Know Me becoming two of the most downloaded and listened-to singles on Portuguese radio stations.

The band released videos for Melancholic Ballad (For The Leftlovers) and How Do You Know Me. Melancholic Ballad (for the Leftlovers), directed by João Costa Menezes and with the participation of actress Débora Monteiro, was selected for International Festivals in Torrelavega (Spain), Leicester and London (England) and Clermont Ferrand (France). The song won an award from the Nova Era radio station. It was used in the soundtrack for the telenovela Celebridade. It was also nominated for two Golden Globes in the categories of Best Song and Best Group/

In 2004 the song Picture Of My Own was used by a Portuguese beer brand to serve as a soundtrack for their new campaign. It was the longest commercial to air on Portuguese television. On the same year, Fingertips opened for The Corrs concert, in the Municipal Stadium of Braga, they acted in the main stage of the Vilar de Mouros Festival. To end the year, they played the New Year with Nelly Furtado. For the rest of the year, Fingertips held a series of acoustic concerts under the title N 'Outros Luares.

On 19 January 2005, the Fingertips recorded their first live DVD, based on an acoustic concert given at nightclub ACT Porto.

In July 2005, the band opened for Queen, in a tour with Paul Rodgers at Stadium of the Restelo. Fingertips began recording a new album released in March 2006 titled Catharsis.

Catharsis was released in 2006.

In October 2006 and after a summer with participation at Rock in Rio Lisboa, the Fingertips released the single Move Faster. The song was also remixed by Nuno Nobre, with an influence of 80's dance music.

May 2007 saw the release of double single Outsider Nº 12 and the ballad You're Gone (Everybody Knows That) as promotion for Catharsis. During the same month the band debuts on its official website the song 18th March, recorded on the occasion of Portugal Fashion. On the same month, the band is invited to be the opening act at George Michael's debut concert in Portugal.

In 2008 the band's first live album, Live ACT, was released in collaboration with the Portuguese Association of Missing Children. The association received portions of the revenue.

In 2009, the band released the song Do It (Magic colors). The same year, Zé Manuel announced his departure from the band.

=== 2010–2017: Changing Direction ===
In 2010, the Fingertips led by their lead composer Rui Saraiva decided to take a new turn. The need for a new voice, new sounds, a new image and attitude that complemented the group was emerging and they went in search of that voice.

On 24 February 2010, from the partnership between LG Electronics, RFM (one of the most heard Portuguese radios) and the Fingertips launched an unprecedented contest. The objective was to find the vocalist of the band, led by Rui Saraiva. The RFM / LG Challenge toured eight cities in the country in the first phase, with a set of hearings for the candidates who signed up for the competition.

On 8 May 2010, the final with 6 finalists was held in São Pedro do Sul, Viseu district, with Joana Gomes becoming the new voice of the Fingertips. With the arrival of Joana, the band finalized some ideas they had in the studio and released the advance single "Simple Words", their first song recorded with Joana Gomes. "Simple Words" puts the new melodic and intense sound of the band on the horizon. A ballad with the sweet and sensual voice of Joan, where you can listen to a melodic piano. The guitar solo brings back memories of past decades and delicate cuts with passion, in an individual and intense chorus. Composed by producers Rui Saraiva and Helder de Matos and marks the arrival of lyricist Virgílio Fino, a Londoner with big Portuguese roots.

On 30 May 2010, the Fingertips took the stage at Rock in Rio Lisbon with the new vocalist Joana. In the concert, two special guests participated, the guitarist Alexandre Almeida and the Brazilian musician/singer Zé Ricardo, who performed the first single from the band "Simple Words" as a duet.

Between months in studio and concerts in Portugal, the album "Venice" was released worldwide on the music market in March 2011. The Fingertips presented the work "Venice" with a special concert during Portugal Fashion 2011, with an image created by the designer Júlio Torcato, (friend of the band for many years) because Portugal Fashion is a place of fashion, and because fashion it is also what you hear. "Venice" includes the singles "Simple Words", "Thinking About You" and "Dreaming of the Moon". The song "Dreaming of the Moon" was remixed by DJ Pete Tha Zouk. The energy and spirit of the elements of the band made them inspired and there was still a lot of material to work on. The ideas were more and the need to put them in the studio was the main thought of the band.

The band released their second album with Joana, titled "2", on 5 March 2012 following six months of studio recording. The album's launch was preceded by its first single, "Running Out of Time".

The band started a tour in Portugal by visiting more than 20 cities, from March 2012 to September 2012. This tour was supported by RFM radio station, SIC television and partners PT/TMN, MusicBox, Tiffosi and Terras do Demo.

Fingertips is music, is communication, is emotion and much more than that. The solidarity aspect associated with music is a social commitment that the band defies and leads to know several institutions/foundations throughout their tour "2". Fingertips showed that music and solidarity can and should be united, helping those who need it most. To this end, they created the solidarity ticket, which consists of a discount of the ticket for the concert for people who bring a food package that will be reverted to the aided institutions. Caritas, Red Cross, Acreditar, Bank food against hunger among many others were the institutions included in this "2" tour.

In October 2012 the Fingertips made their first appearance in Asia with several concerts in Shanghai and Hangzhou.

In 2013 the Fingertips inspired by their Asia experience begin to prepare a new path for the international promotion of their music. They develop a new creative work in their studio and receive the support of Safta Jaffery (Muse, Stone Roses, Coldplay, Radiohead) and Ron Saint Germain (Jimi Hendrix, U2, Michael Jackson, Red Hot Chili Peppers, etc.).

They are invited to create the official song of Eurogym 2013. The song "Let's Share" was presented at the presentation ceremony of the Stadium in Coimbra. In 2014 the Fingertips began the international promotion with concerts in Brazil (São Paulo and Rio de Janeiro) and in China at the West Bund Music Festival. In 2015 they travel to Los Angeles to record new original material with producer Mark Needham (The Killers, Imagine Dragons, Fleetwood Mac, Moby, etc.). Meanwhile, the international promotion continues with showcases in Los Angeles, Toronto, Brighton, Amsterdam, Singapore, Sydney, Tokyo, Shanghai, Berlin and other cities.

Still in the year of 2015 they publish the single "Out of Control", produced and mixed by Mark Needham in The Ballroom in Hollywood. Many international radio airplay singles are featured (KROQ Los Angeles, CA), (KNDD Seattle, WA), (WRUR Rochester, NY), (KKDO Sacramento, CA), (Triple MMM, Australia) among many others. They return to Shanghai to film the video of the single "Out of Control" with director Vasco Mendes.

In 2016 they began a trip through Europe, passing through Paris, Brussels, Amsterdam, Hamburg, Berlin where they film a video documentary under the direction of director Vasco Mendes. They return to Hollywood in April to record with Mark Needham the single "Kiss Me" and invited the director Vasco Mendes to produce the new video, taking advantage of the landscapes of Hollywood, Santa Monica and Venice Beach. Still in 2016 the Fingertips presented at the Casa da Música in Porto a concert to the Portuguese audience that mirrors the creative work they have developed in recent months.

In the year 2017 they edited the single "Somebody New" and chosen their hometown Viseu to film the official video.

=== 2018-present: Return of Zé Manuel ===
2018 was the 15th anniversary of the release of the 1st album All 'bout Smoke 'n Mirrors. the Fingertips announced the return of Zé Manuel to participate in these celebrations. All discography recorded between 2003 and 2009 was converted to digital format.

== Members ==
- Rui Saraiva – composer, producer, bass, guitar, piano (2003-present)
- Zé Manuel – vocals (2003-2009) (2018-present)
- Jorge Oliveira – drums (2003-2009) (2018-present)
- Vasco Saraiva – guitar (2022-present)

== Musicians ==
- Domingos Alves – piano (2003-2006)
- Alexis Dias – guitar (2003-2008)
- Rodrigo Ribeiro – guitar (2008-2012)
- Joana Gomes – vocals (2010-2017)
- Marito Marques – drums (2010-2012)
- Alexandre Almeida – guitar (2010) (2012)
- Alexandre Tomás – drums (2012-2013)
- João Abrantes – guitar (2012-2014)
- Cecilia Costa – drums (2013-2016)

== Discography ==
=== Albums ===
- All 'Bout Smoke 'n Mirrors (2003)
- Catharsis (2006)
- Venice (2011)
- 2 (2012)

=== Live albums ===
- Live ACT (2008)

=== EP'S ===
- Magic Heart EP (2009)
- Dear Jean EP (2022)

=== Singles ===
- Melancholic Ballad (For The Leftlovers) (2003)
- How Do You Know Me (2004)
- Picture Of My Own (2004)
- Rock You For Free (2005)
- 'Cause To Love You (2006)
- Move Faster (2006)
- Outsider No. 12 (2007)
- You're Gone (Everybody Knows That) (2007)
- DO IT (Magic Colors) (2009)
- Simple Words (2010)
- Thinking About You (2010)
- Dreaming of the Moon (2011)
- Running Out Of Time (2012)
- Let's Share (2012)
- Out Of Control (2015)
- Kiss Me (2016)
- Somebody New (2017)
- My Everyday (2018)
- Dark Phoenix (2022)
- Better (2022)

== Concert tours ==
- All 'Bout Smoke 'n Mirrors Tour (2003–05)
- N'Outros Luares (2004)
- Catharsis Tour (2006–07)
- Grandes Emoções (2008)
- Live ACT Tour (2008)
- Magic Heart Tour (2009)
- Venice Tour (2010–11)
- 2 Tour (2012–13)
- From Portugal to the World (2014–17)
