= Bunnyranch =

Portuguese rock band

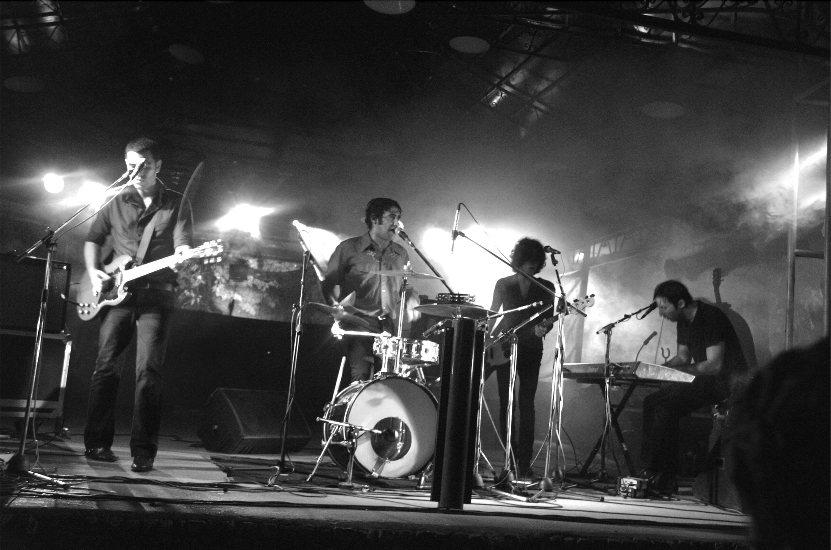
- Bunnyranch performing in September 2005

Background information
- Origin: Coimbra, Lisbon, Santa Maria da Feira, Portugal
- Genres: Rock, rock and roll, garage rock, blues, soul, funk, punk rock, indie rock
- Years active: 2002-2012
- Labels: ARTEZ
- Past members: Kaló; João Cardoso; Augusto Cardoso; Pedro Calhau; Filipe Costa; André Ferrão

Bunnyranch is a Portuguese rock 'n' roll band originally from Coimbra formed by Kaló, Filipe Costa, Pedro Calhau and André Ferrão. After the departure of Filipe Costa and André Ferrão, they were replaced by João Cardoso and Augusto Cardoso. The band was named after the famous American brothel Moonlite BunnyRanch, located in Mound House, Nevada in the United States.

In addition to being popular in Portugal, the band also toured Spain, the Netherlands and England. Their stage performances are known for being explosive, which has become a hallmark of the band. A documentary film was shot documenting the band's career.

== Members ==
ex-members

- Filipe Costa - keyboard, piano
- André Ferrão - guitar
- Kaló - vocals and drums
- João Cardoso - keyboards, piano and vocals
- Augusto Cardoso - guitar
- Pedro Calhau - bass

== Discography ==
=== Albums ===
- 2004: Trying to Lose [Lux Records]
- 2006: Luna Dance [Transformadores]
- 2008: Teach Us Lord... How To Wait [Lux Records]
- 2010: If You Missed the Last Train

=== EPs ===
- 2002: Too Flop to Boogie (EP) [Lux Records]
- 2008: Teach Us Lord (EP) (from album Teach Us Lord... How To Wait) [Lux Records]
- 2008: How To Wait (EP) (from album Teach Us Lord... How To Wait) [Lux Records]
