= A Naifa =

- Origin: Portugal
- Years active: 2004 - Present
- Members: Luís Varatojo; Maria Antónia Mendes; Sandra Baptista; Samuel Palitos
- Past members: João Aguardela; Vasco Vaz
- Website: www.anaifa.com

A Naifa is a Portuguese music group.

== Albums ==
- Canções Subterrâneas (2004)
- 3 Minutos Antes da Maré Encher (2006)
- Uma Inocente Inclinação para o Mal (2008)
- não se deitam comigo corações obedientes (February 2012)
