= Dealema =

Portuguese hip-hop band

- Origin: Porto; Vila Nova de Gaia
- Genres: Hip-hop
- Years active: 1996–present
- Labels: Norte Sul, Banzé, Optimus Discos
- Members: Maze; Fuse; Mundo Segundo; Expeão; DJ Guze
- Website: www.dealema.pt

Dealema is a long-running Portuguese hip-hop group based in Porto. Along with Mind Da Gap, they are one of the oldest hip-hop bands in Portugal and had major influence over the genre's development across the country. Their early influences included Mobb Deep, Wu-Tang Clan, and Nas. Dealema has been performing with the same lineup of Mundo, DJ Guze, Fuse, Expeão, and Maze since forming in 1996.

== History ==
Dealema was formed in 1996, the result of a merger between Factor X and Fullashit. They self-published their first album, O Expresso do Submundo, in 1996 and reissued the cassette in 2018. Their self-titled album was produced by Norte Sul and released in 2003. V Império (Banzé, 2008) is considered the album that solidified Porto as the capital of the country's hip-hop scene. In 2010, they were on-boarded to Optimus Discos by Antena 3 presenter Henrique Amaro, who was the artistic director of the label's project focusing on Portuguese talent. Their EP Arte de Vivier was released in 2010, followed by A Grande Tribulação in 2011. Their sixth album, Alvorada da Alma (2013) featured 12 guest musicians including Ace from Mind Da Gap ("Bom Dia"), Emicida ("Comportamentos bizarros"), Nach, and Angolan rapper Kid MC ("Plara É A Alma").

In 2015, the band started filming for what was initially going to be a documentary but later morphed into a multi-episode documentary series. It was directed by Rui Miguel Abreu and released onto YouTube. In 2017, the band shared that they were primarily focusing on their solo work but that "[t]hese breaks are nothing new." They appeared in the docuseries Implementation of Rapública in 2019; in series 2, episode 5 of the A Arte Elétrica in Portugal in 2020; and No Ar in 2021.

== Discography ==
- O Expresso do Submundo (1996, EP)
- Dealema (2003, LP)
- V Império (2008, LP)
- Arte de Viver (2010, EP)
- A Grande Tribulação (2011, LP)
- Alvorada da Alma (2013, LP)
- 96 ao Infinito (2026, LP)

== Personnel ==
- Edmundo "Mundo Segundo" Silva
- André "Maze" Neves
- Expeão
- Fuse
- DJ Guze
