= The Act-Ups =

Portuguese soul-rock band

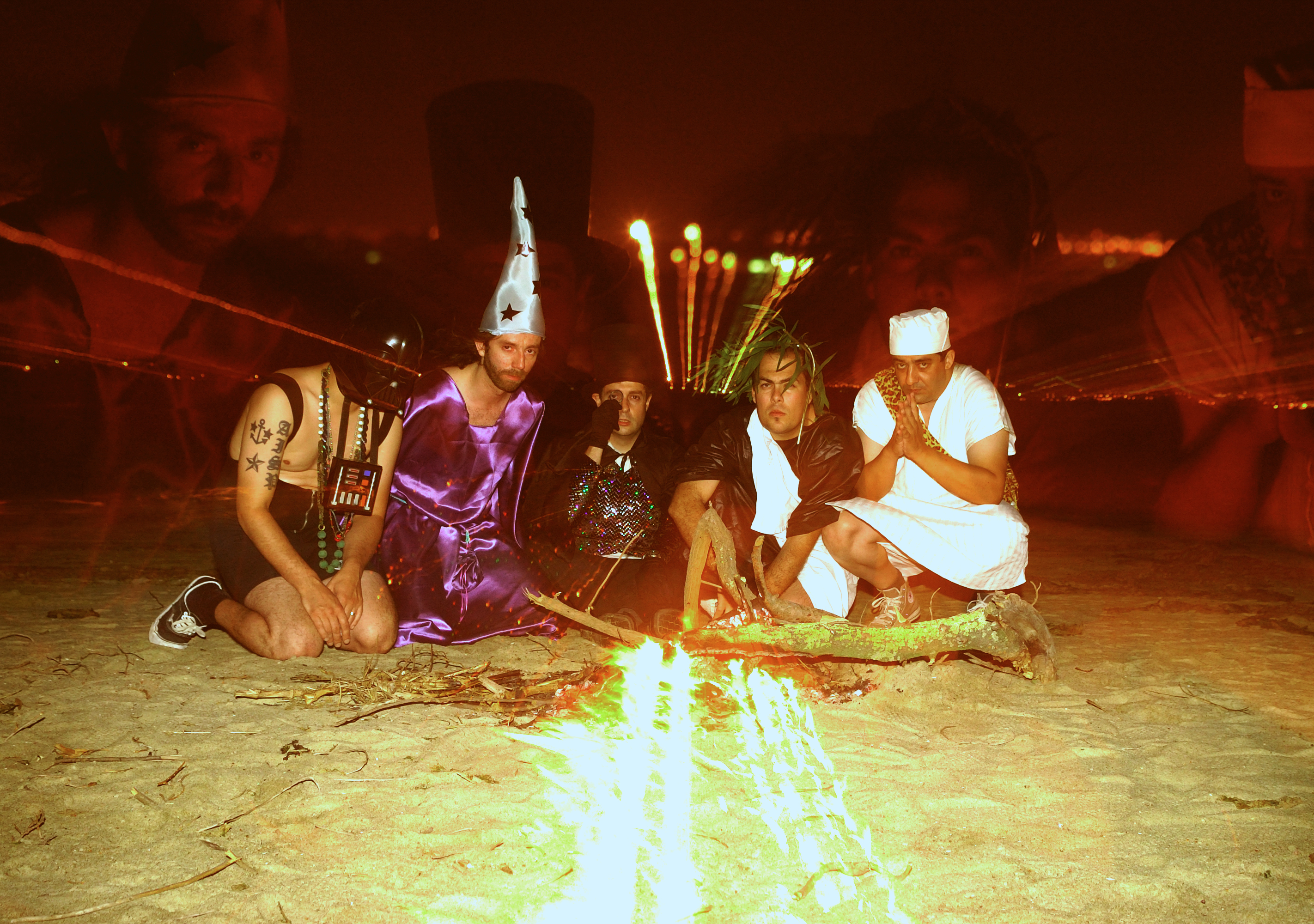
- Promo shot for the Act-ups by Rui Serrano, 2008.

Background information
- Origin: Barreiro, Portugal
- Genres: rock soul garage rock
- Labels: Hey, Pachuco! Recs., Groovie Records, Beatnickmoon
- Members: Nick Nicotine; Johnny Intense; Pistol Pete; N. Very; Tony Fetiche
- Past members: Gomez (Was made for love); Hellso
- Website: The Act-Ups' Myspace

The Act-Ups are a Portuguese band formed in Barreiro, in 2001. Formed from the demise of country-punk band The Sullens, they started up with a formation consisting of three guitars, bass, organ and drums. Their first record, I Bet You Love Us Too, released through Hey, Pachuco! Recs. in 2003 is a mix of garage rock, punk and soul.

Their second record, The Marriage of Heaven and Hell was released in 2006 through Hey, Pachuco! Recs. on CD. The record was also released in a European limited edition through Spanish label Beatnickmoon Rock and Roll Crafts. The band's line-up changed with Pistol Pete replacing Hellso on the drums and Gomez (was made for love) leaving the band. With this record the band had a great reception in Spain, which led them to tour the country several times. Later that year the band released an EP, Take me Home through Groovie Records. Music from that record was used in "Um ano mais longo", a movie by director Marco Martins.

In September 2008 the band released their 3rd album, The Act-Ups Play The Old Psychedelic Sounds of Today, recorded at Estúdio King in Barreiro. It was released on CD and LP through Hey, Pachuco! Recs. and Groovie Records.

== Line-up ==
Nick Nicotine: vocals, guitar
N Very - guitar
Johnny Intense - guitar
Pistol Pete - drums, vocals
Tony Fetiche - bass

== Discography ==
- I bet you love us too (2003)
- The Marriage of Heaven and Hell (2006)
- Take me Home EP (2006)
- The Act-Ups play the old psychedelic sounds of today (2008)
- Homo Zugadita Quasar Monacant (2015)
