= Brigada Víctor Jara =

- Origin: Coimbra, Portugal
- Genres: Folk
- Years active: 1975–present
- Website: www.facebook.com/brigadavictorjara/

The Brigada Víctor Jara (lit. 'Víctor Jara Brigade') is a Portuguese folk band, with a career of more than 30 years and among the most influential Portuguese folk acts.

The band was formed in 1975, by a group of young people from Coimbra that was participating in one of the massive literacy campaigns carried out by the provisional governments that administered Portugal in the years after the Carnation Revolution of 1974. The group was working in the inland region of Beira Baixa and often played Chilean and Portuguese folk and political songs for the people. After discovering the cultural and musical traditions of the region the group formed the band and named it after Víctor Jara, a Chilean socialist and folk singer-songwriter, killed after the Chilean coup of 1973 carried out by General Augusto Pinochet.

== Discography ==
- 1977 - Eito Fora
- 1979 - Tamborileiro
- 1981 - Quem Sai aos Seus
- 1982 - Marcha dos Foliões
- 1984 - Contraluz
- 1989 - Monte Formoso
- 1995 - Danças e Folias
- 2000 - Por Sendas Montes e Vales
- 2003 - Ceia Louca (Single)
- 2006 - Ceia Louca (CD)

== Band members ==
- Arnaldo de Carvalho - percussion and chorus
- Aurélio Malva - mandolin, guitar, bagpipe,"Viola Braguesa" and voice
- Catarina Moura - voice
- José Tovim - bass guitar and chorus
- Joaquim Teles / Quim Né - drums and percussion
- Luís Garção Nunes - guitar, "Viola Beiroa" and "Viola Toeira" and cavaquinho
- Manuel Pires da Rocha - violin and mandolin
- Ricardo Dias - piano, flute, accordion and bagpipe
- Rui Curto - accordion and concertina
