= Xutos & Pontapés =

Portuguese rock band

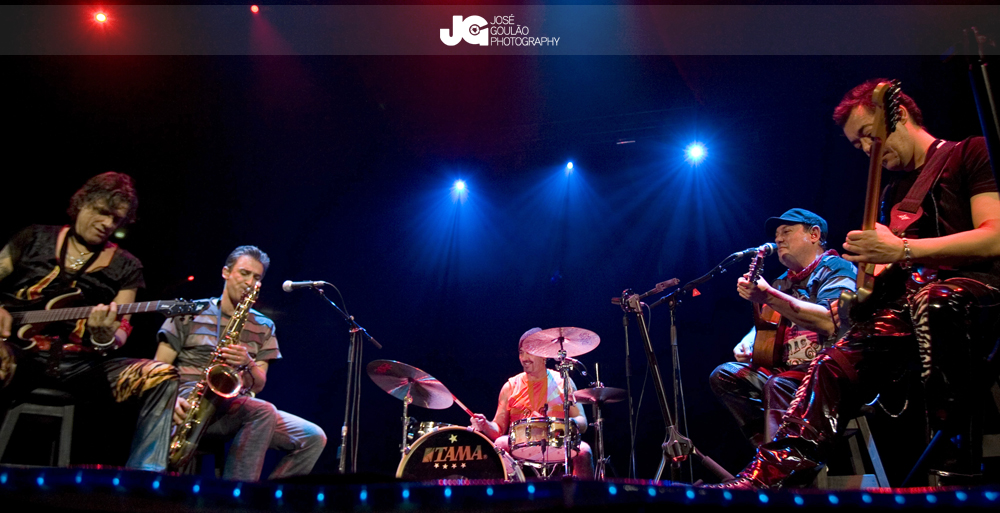
- Xutos & Pontapés in 2007. From left to right: Zé Pedro, Gui, Kalú, Tim and João Cabeleira.

Background information
- Origin: Lisbon, Portugal
- Genres: Rock, hard rock, new wave, punk rock
- Years active: 1978–present
- Labels: Rotação; Dansa do Som; PolyGram; EMI; Universal Music; Sony Music
- Members: Tim; Kalú; João Cabeleira; Gui
- Past members: Zé Pedro; Zé Leonel; Francis
- Website: www.xutos.pt

Xutos & Pontapés (/ʃuːtuːʃ ɪ poʊntəpɛʃ/) are a Portuguese rock band. The band was founded in 1978, in Lisbon, by the late Zé Pedro, Zé Leonel, Kalú and Tim. Their current lineup consists of Tim (vocals, bass), João Cabeleira (guitar), Gui (saxophone, keyboards) and Kalú (drums).

Xutos & Pontapés are often considered the most successful rock band from Portugal. The band is popularly known by its fanbase as simply Xutos.

== History ==
=== 1978: Formation and band name ===
In 1978 Zé Pedro and Zé Leonel decided to start a punk rock band, with Zé Pedro on the guitar and Zé Leonel on vocals. Together with Paulo Borges they started with the name Delirium Tremens. They auditioned Kalú for the drums part and decided to change their name to Xutos & Pontapés. Shortly after, Paulo Borges was replaced on the bass by Tim. The band had their first rehearsal in December 1978.

Both xutos (an alternate spelling of the word chutos, remotely from English-influenced early 20th century soccer slang) and pontapés are Portuguese words that mean "kicks", but xuto is also a slang word for heroin injection.

=== 1979–1984: Early years ===
Xutos & Pontapés' first live show was on 13 January 1979, in a celebration of 25 years of rock and roll at the Sociedade Filarmónica Amigos do Apolo in Lisbon, where they played four songs in six minutes, at 3 a.m. In 1980 Xutos & Pontapés were the opening act for Wilko Johnson at the Belenenses Pavilion in Lisbon. During the year, they played several other concerts and made their first recordings, while working on their main jobs.

In 1981 Francis joined the band as a guitar player. Shortly after, Zé Leonel left the band and Tim became the vocalist. The band continued playing concerts throughout the year. At the end of the year, they signed their first contract with the label Rotação and released their first single, "Sémen". The song was successful among radio listeners.

In 1982 they released their second single, "Toca e Foge", and their debut album 1978-1982. The album was well received by critics but was not commercially successful. Their label, Rotação, closed its doors in late summer that year.

In 1983 Francis left the band. Xutos & Pontapés invested in live shows, playing concerts almost every night, and their fanbase started growing. João Cabeleira joined the band in late 1983 for the role of lead guitarist.

In late 1984 Gui joined the band as a saxophone player.

=== 1985–1989: Rise to fame ===
By 1985, Xutos & Pontapés had achieved considerable fame in Portugal as a live band. During this year they negotiated a contract with EMI but the negotiations didn't end successfully, so the band signed with independent label Dansa do Som and released their second album Cerco. The presentation concerts at the Rock Rendez-Vous in Lisbon brought a record attendance to the nightclub.

In 1986, they re-recorded the songs "Barcos Gregos" and "Homem do Leme" from Cerco for single releases. The band played two sold-out concerts at the Rock Rendez-Vous with the intention of releasing a live album. The album ended up not being released at the time but was later released in 2000, named 1º De Agosto no Rock Rendez-Vous. The band signed their first major-label contract with PolyGram.

1987 was the breakthrough year for Xutos & Pontapés, with the release of their third album, Circo de Feras, which was a commercial and critical success in Portugal. By the end of the year the album was certified Gold (over 20,000 records sold) by the AFP. The release of the album was followed by a six-month tour that ended with a concert in August at the Belenenses Pavilion in Lisbon, with 6,000 people in the attendance. Later in 1987 they released the single "7º Single", which contained a cover of "A Minha Casinha", a song from the film 1943 Portuguese film O Costa do Castelo. The single also included an instrumental song called "A Minha Aventura Homossexual Com O General Custer". The single sold over 50,000 copies.

Further success followed in 1988, in which the fourth studio album, 88, was released. The band embarked in another 6-month tour and also released a triple live album named Ao Vivo.

=== 1990–2003 ===
In 1990, Xutos & Pontapés released the album Gritos Mudos. The album was not well received by critics and the band saw their concerts attracting smaller crowds. By 1991 the band was struggling with financial and management problems. Gui decided to leave the band and the other members embarked in side projects. The future of the band was uncertain around this time.

The band returned to studio in 1992 and record the songs for their next two albums: Dizer Não de Vez (1992) and Direito ao Deserto (1993). In 1994 the band celebrated their 15-year anniversary with a concert at the Coliseu do Porto, joined by all their former members at the time: Zé Leonel, Francis and Gui. In 1995, the band play and record an acoustic concert for Antena 3 in a format similar to MTV Unplugged, which was released in the Ao Vivo na Antena 3.

The band switched to the record label EMI in 1997 and released the studio album Dados Viciados. The tour supporting Dados Viciados finished with two concerts at the Coliseu dos Recreios in Lisbon. In 1998 Xutos & Pontapés composed the soundtrack for Joaquim Leitão's film Tentação.

1999 was marked by the band's 20th anniversary celebrations. A tribute album named XX Anos XX Bandas was released, containing 20 covers of Xutos & Pontapés' songs by several famous Portuguese artists. In March 1999, the band played their anniversary concert at the Pavilhão Atlântico in Lisbon. It was also the band's first show of the "XX Anos" (XX Years) tour, which would end with a concert at the Sudoeste Festival in August, in which some of the bands that took part on the tribute album joined Xutos & Pontapés on stage. Towards the end of the year, they wrote the soundtrack for another Joaquim Leitão film, Inferno.

In 2001 the band released the studio album XIII, which was supported by a national tour that was interrupted for a few weeks due to Zé Pedro's health problems. During this year, Xutos & Pontapés' shows had a total attendance of 600,000 people. Recordings from these concerts were released in the live album Sei Onde Tu Estás – Ao Vivo 2001, in 2002.

In 2003 one of Zé Pedro's old dreams was fulfilled when Xutos & Pontapés played the opening act for The Rolling Stones, in their concert in Coimbra.

=== 2004–2017 ===
In 2004 Gui returned as an official member of Xutos & Pontapés and the band released the album O Mundo ao Contrário. For their 25th anniversary celebrations, they played two sold-out concerts in October at the Pavilhão Atlântico, with a total attendance of 28.000 people.

On 13 January 2009, the band celebrated their 30th anniversary with a show at the Pavilhão de Portugal in Lisbon. In April 2009, they released a new self-titled studio album. On 26 September 2009, they finished their 30th anniversary tour with a three-hour show at a packed Estádio do Restelo. In November 2009, Xutos & Pontapés won the MTV Europe Music Award for Best Portuguese Act.

In 2012 they released O Cerco Continua, a re-recording of their 1985 album Cerco.

In January 2014 Xutos & Pontapés released the album Puro. On 7 and 8 March 2014, they played for 30.000 people at the MEO Arena in Lisbon.

Founding member and guitarist Zé Pedro died on 30 November 2017, aged 61.

=== 2018–present: After Zé Pedro's death ===
The remaining members of Xutos & Pontapés decided to go on with the band after Zé Pedro's death. Their first concert without Zé Pedro was a New Year's Eve show in Albufeira.

In 2019 Xutos & Pontapés released their latest studio album, Duro.

== Legacy and tributes ==
In 2004 the Portuguese President Jorge Sampaio awarded all members of Xutos & Pontapés with the Order of Merit for 25 years of career achievements in the Portuguese music industry.

In 2009 the Mayor of Lisbon António Costa awarded the band the Municipal Golden Medal of Merit.

Xutos & Pontapés' version of "A Minha Casinha" was adopted as a hymn by the Portugal national team during the UEFA Euro 2016.

American heavy metal band Metallica covered "A Minha Casinha" in their concert at the Altice Arena in Lisbon, on 1 February 2018, as a tribute to recently deceased Zé Pedro.

== Members ==
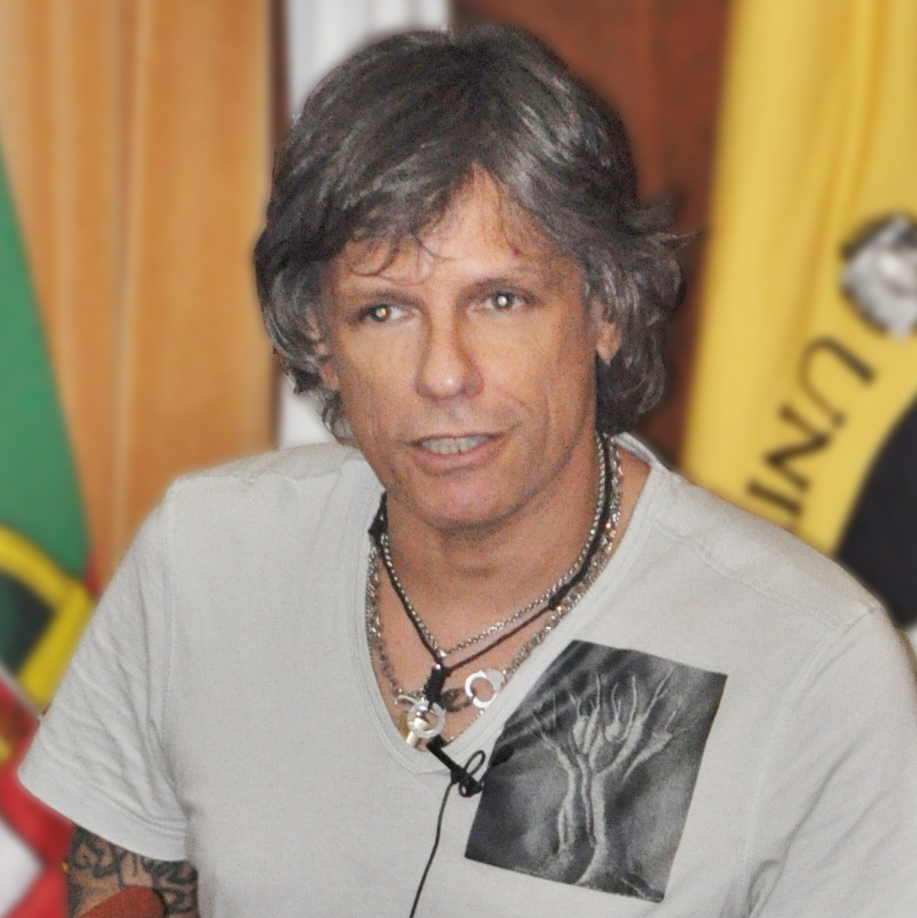
Founding member and guitarist Zé Pedro (1956–2017)

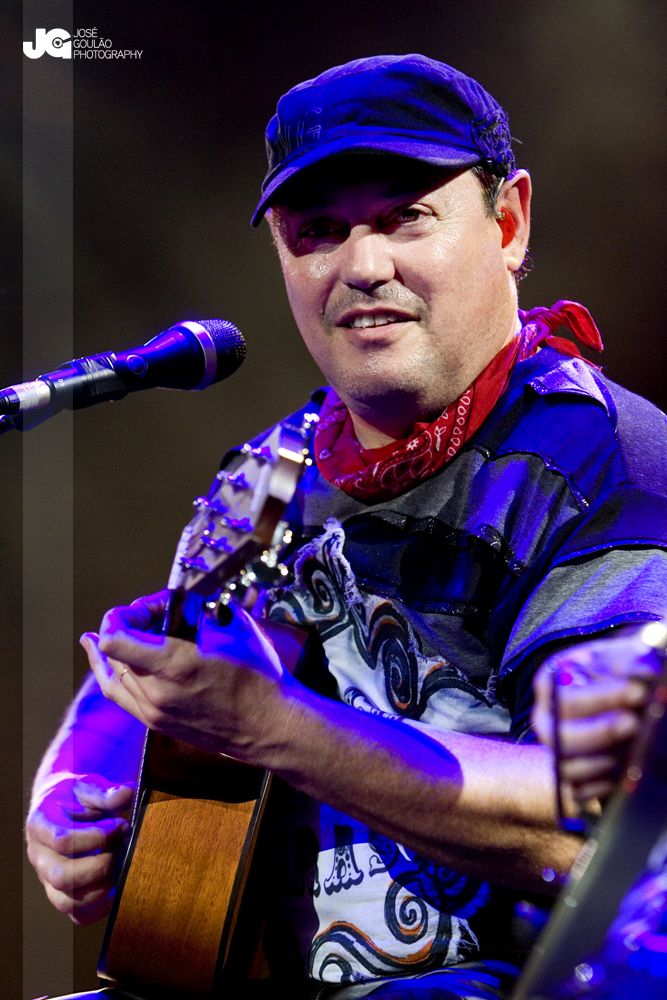
Vocalist and bassist Tim in 2007

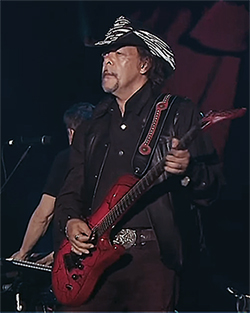
Lead guitarist João Cabeleira in 2016

Current members

- Tim – vocals, bass (1978–present)
- João Cabeleira – guitar (1983–present)
- Gui – saxophone, keyboards, backing vocals (1984–1991, 2004–present)
- Kalú – drums, backing vocals (1978–present)

Past members

- Zé Pedro – guitar (1978 – 2017; died 2017)
- Zé Leonel – vocals (1978 – 1981; died 2011)
- Francis – guitar (1981–1983)

== Discography ==
=== Studio albums ===
- 1978–1982 (1982)
- Cerco (Siege) (1985)
- Circo De Feras (Circus of Beasts) (1987)
- 88 (1988)
- Gritos Mudos (Mute Screams) (1990)
- Dizer Não De Vez (To Say No for Good) (1992)
- Direito Ao Deserto (Right to the Desert) (1993)
- Dados Viciados (Loaded Dice) (1997)
- Tentação (Temptation) (Original Soundtrack from the Film) (1998)
- XIII (2001)
- O Mundo Ao Contrário (The World Upside-Down) (2004)
- Xutos & Pontapés (2009)
- Puro (Pure) (2014)
- Duro (Hard) (2019)

=== Live albums ===
- Ao Vivo (1988)
- Ao Vivo Na Antena 3 (1995)
- 1º De Agosto no Rock Rendez-Vous (2000)
- Sei Onde Tu Estás – Ao Vivo 2001 (2002)
- Nesta Cidade (2003)
- Ao Vivo no Pavilhão Atlântico (2005)
- 35 – Ao Vivo 2014 (2014)
- Se Me Amas – Acústico (2016)

=== Compilation albums ===
- Vida Malvada (2000)
- O Cerco Continua (2012)
- 40 Anos a Dar no Duro (2019)
