= Super Bock Super Rock line-ups =

Super Bock Super Rock is a music festival in Portugal, organized yearly since 1995. It has been held in various places throughout the years.

== 1995 ==
The first edition was held on 8 and 9 July 1995 at the Gare Marítima de Alcântara, in Lisbon.

8 July	9 July
The Jesus and Mary Chain; GNR; The Young Gods; Thunder; Blind Zero; Black Company; Techman	The Cure; Faith No More; Therapy?; Morphine; Youssou N'Dour; Paulo Mendonça

== 1996 ==
The second edition was held between 21 and 23 June 1996 at the Passeio Marítimo de Alcântara, in Lisbon.

21 June	22 June	23 June
Spooky; Delfins; Xutos & Pontapés; Paradise Lost; Nefilim; D.A.D.; Moonspell	The Prodigy; Massive Attack; Fluke; The Divine Comedy; Martin Stephenson; Da Weasel	David Bowie; Neneh Cherry; Echobelly; John Mayall; Shane MacGowan & The Popes; Primitive Reason; Flood

== 1997 ==
The third edition was held on 4 and 5 July 1997, at the Passeio Marítimo de Algés, in Algés, Oeiras.

4 July	5 July
Simple Minds; Rage Against the Machine; 311; L7; Subcircus; Zen	Apocalyptica; Echo And The Bunnymen; Skank; Ani DiFranco; Ramp; Blasted Mechanism

== 1998 ==
The fourth edition was held on 31 July and 1 August 1997, at the Praça Sony in Lisbon, during the Expo '98 World's Fair.

31 July	1 August
Morphine; Fastball; Mike Scott; Mikel Erentxun; Luís Represas	Zen; Autoerotique; Clã; Spiritualized; Van Morrison; Ala dos Namorados; DJs Henrique Amaro, Zé Pedro and António Sérgio

== 2004 ==
In its 10th edition, Super Bock Super Rock returned to the open-air festival format. It was held between 9 and 11 June 2004, at Parque Tejo, in Lisbon.

	9 June	10 June	11 June
Main Stage	Korn; Linkin Park; Muse; Static-X; Pleymo	N.E.R.D.; Nelly Furtado; Avril Lavigne; Reamonn; Los Hermanos	Fatboy Slim; Massive Attack; Lenny Kravitz; Pixies; Hundred Reasons
Quinta dos Portugueses Stage	Da Weasel; Blasted Mechanism; Anger; Yellow W Van; Fonzie	David Fonseca; Toranja; Dealema; Gomo; Patrícia Faria	Clã; Pluto; André Indiana; X-Wife; Loosers

== 2005 ==
The 11th edition was held between 27 and 29 May 2005, at Parque Tejo, in Lisbon.

	27 May	28 May	29 May
Main Stage	The Prodigy; System of a Down; Incubus; The Eighties Matchbox B-Line Disaster; Louie - London 6 Piece band, Andy Twigden	New Order; Moby; The Black Eyed Peas; The Hives; Turbonegro; Flipsyde	Marilyn Manson; Audioslave; Iggy & The Stooges; Slayer; Mastodon; Wednesday 13
Quinta dos Portugueses Stage	Blasted Mechanism; The Temple; Primitive Reason; Tara Perdida; Bizarra Locomotiva; Black Sunrise	The Gift; Loto; Expensive Soul; Fonzie; Easyway; Boss AC; Blend	Blind Zero; WrayGunn; Bunnyranch; Ramp

== 2006 ==
The 12th edition was held on 25 and 26 May, and 7 and 8 June 2005, at Parque Tejo, in Lisbon.

25 May	26 May	7 June	8 June
Korn; Within Temptation; Soulfly; Moonspell; Ramp; Bizarra Locomotiva; CineMuerte; Twenty Inch Burial; Devil in Me	Tool; Placebo; Deftones; Alice in Chains; Primitive Reason; The Vicious 5; X-Wife	Franz Ferdinand; Keane; The Cult; dEUS; Editors; The Legendary Tiger Man; Linda Martini; Peace Revolution; The Weatherman	50 Cent; Pharrell Williams; Patrice Bart-Williams; Boss AC; Mind Da Gap; Mercado Negro

== 2007 ==
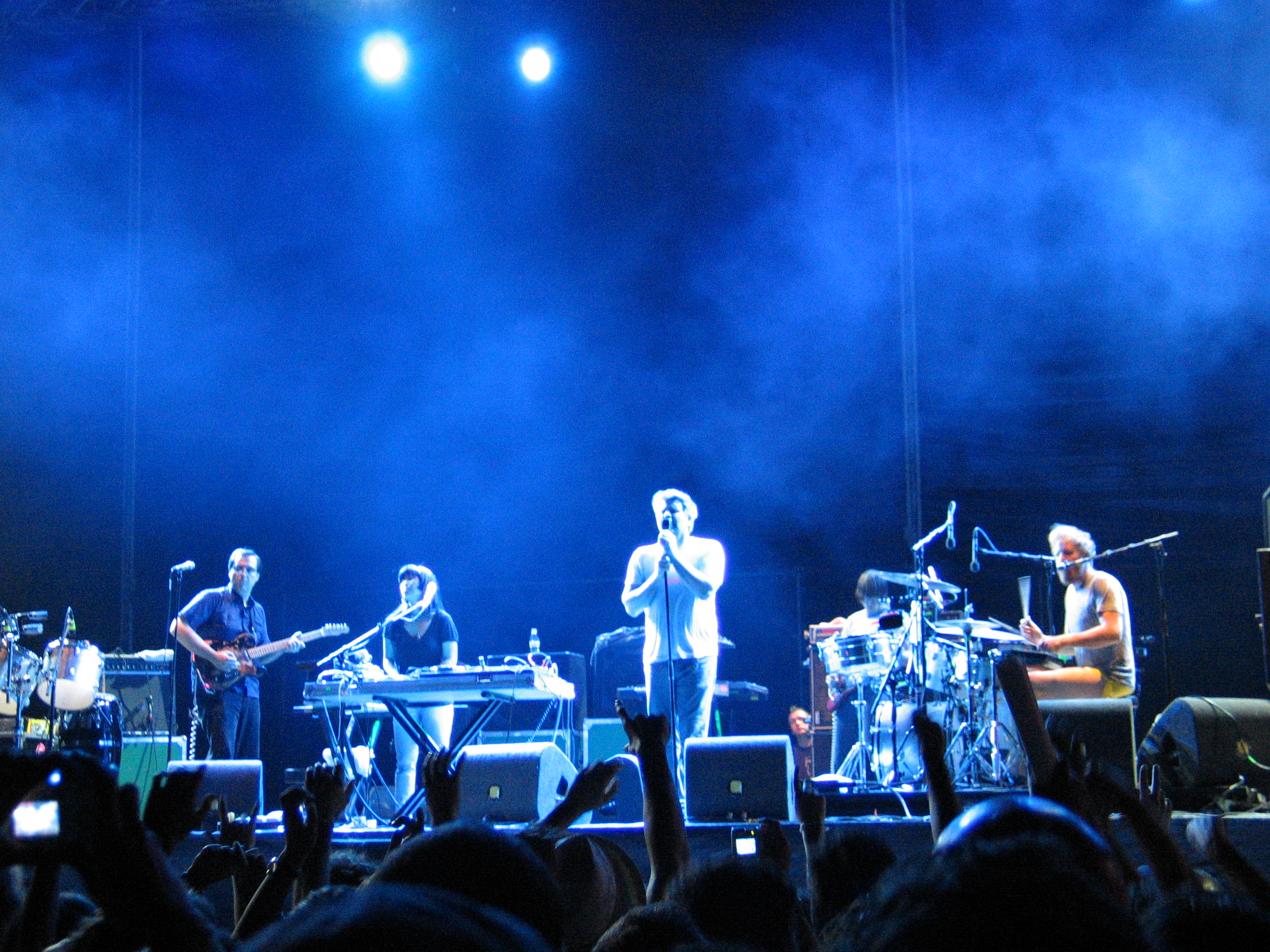
LCD Soundsystem in 2007

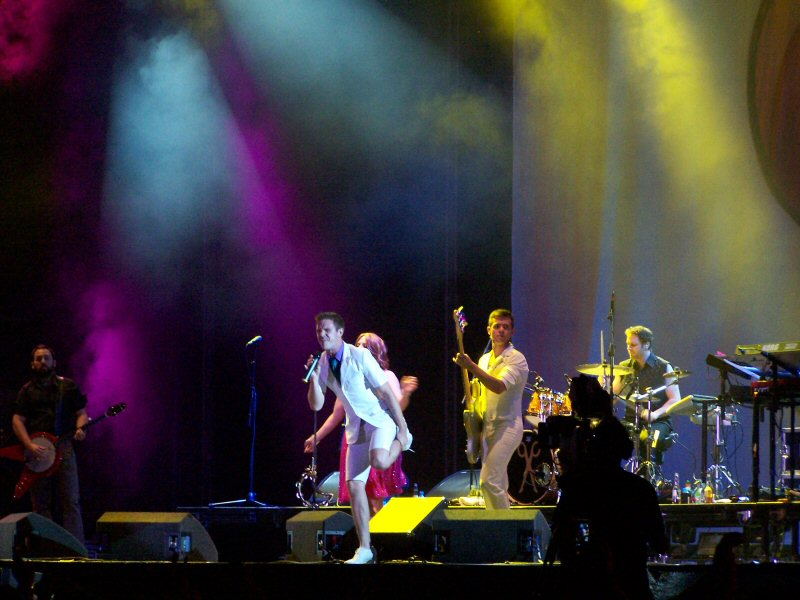
Scissor Sisters in 2007

The 13th edition was held on 28 June and between 3 and 5 July 2007, at Parque Tejo, in Lisbon.

28 June	3 July	4 July	5 July
Metallica; Joe Satriani; Stone Sour; Mastodon; The Blood Brothers; Men Eater	Arcade Fire; Bloc Party; The Magic Numbers; Klaxons; The Gift; Bunnyranch; Y?	LCD Soundsystem; The Jesus and Mary Chain; Maxïmo Park; The Rapture (cancelled); Clap Your Hands Say Yeah; Linda Martini; Mundo Cão	Underworld; Interpol; Scissor Sisters; TV on the Radio; The Gossip; X-Wife; Micro Audio Waves; Anselmo Ralph

== 2008 ==
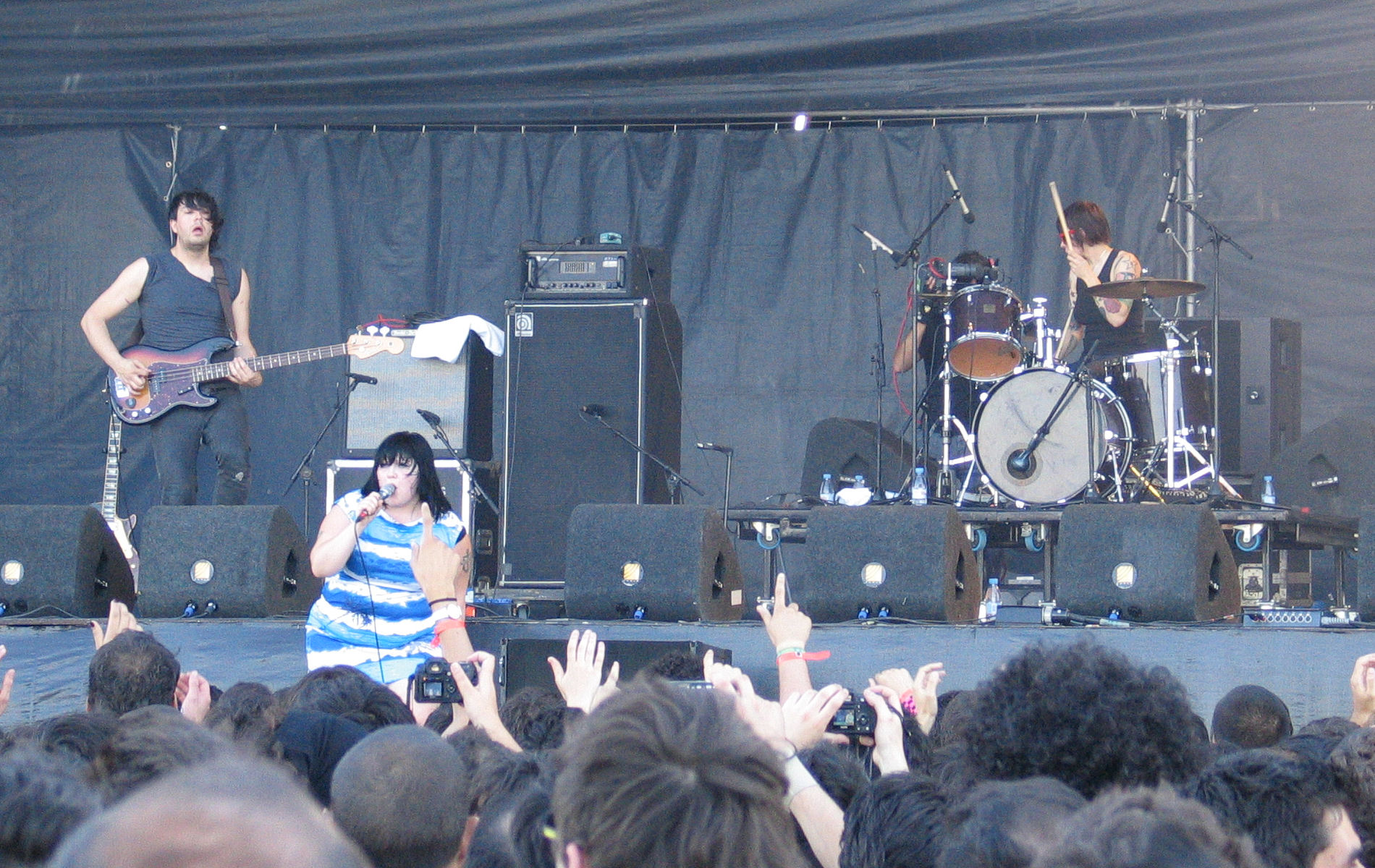
Gossip at Super Bock Super Rock in 2007

The 14th edition of Super Bock Super Rock was held in July 2008, once again in more than one city. It was held at Estádio do Bessa in Porto on 4 and 5 July 2008, and at Parque Tejo in Lisbon on 9 and 10 July 2008.

Porto		Lisbon	
4 July	5 July	9 July	10 July
Xutos & Pontapés with Orquestra de Jazz do Hot Club; ZZ Top; Love & Rockets; David Fonseca; Crowded House	Jamiroquai; Morcheeba; Brand New Heavies; Clã; Jorge Palma; Paolo Nutini	Iron Maiden; Slayer; Avenged Sevenfold; Rose Tattoo; Lauren Harris; Tara Perdida	DJ Tiesto; Digitalism; Beck; Mika; Duran Duran; Mesa with Rui Reininho

== 2009 ==
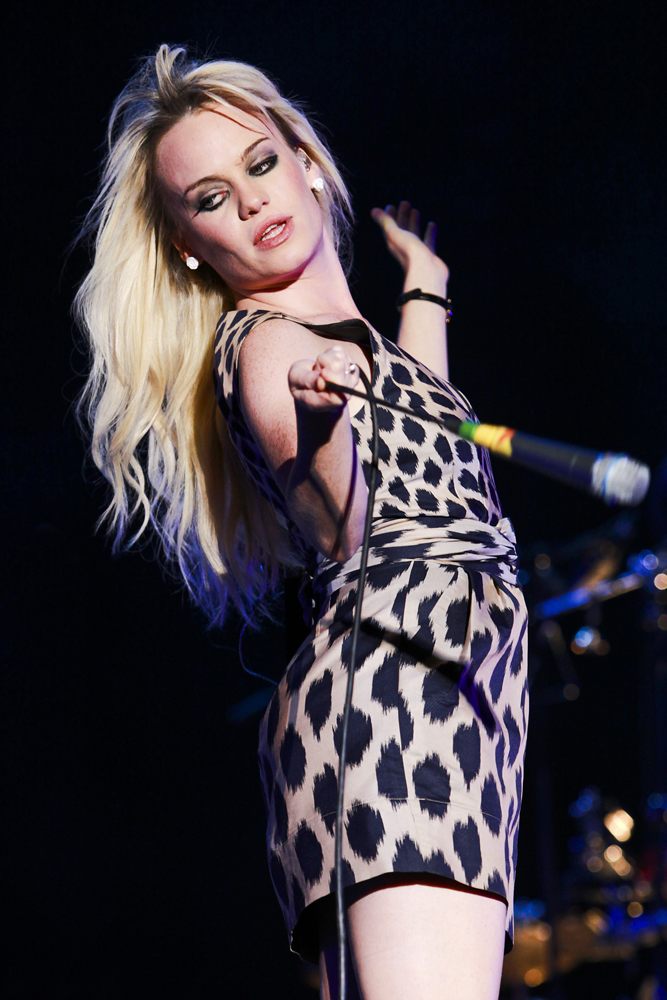
Duffy in 2009.

The 15th edition of Super Bock Super Rock had a format similar to the previous year. It took place on 5 July 2009, at the Estádio do Bessa, and in Lisbon on 18 July 2009, at the Estádio do Restelo.

Porto	Lisbon
5 July	18 July
Depeche Mode (cancelled, substituted by The Gift and Xutos e Pontapés); Nouvelle Vague; Tristan Prettyman; Peter Bjorn and John; Motor; Soapbox	The Killers; Duffy; Mando Diao; Brandi Carlile; The Walkmen; Bettershell

== 2010 ==
The 16th edition of Super Bock Super Rock was the first to be held at the Herdade do Cabeço da Flauta, near the Meco beach, in Sesimbra. It took place on 16, 17 and 18 July 2010. There were 3 stages at the event: Palco Super Bock, Palco EDP and @Meco.

	16 July	17 July	18 July
Super Bock Stage	Pet Shop Boys; Keane; Mayer Hawthorne; Cut Copy; Jamie Lidell	Leftfield; Vampire Weekend; Hot Chip; Julian Casablancas; Tiago Bettencourt & Mantha	Prince; Empire of the Sun; The National; Spoon; Stereophonics; Palma's Gang
EDP Stage	Beach House; Grizzly Bear; The Temper Trap; St. Vincent; Godmen (SBSR Preload Competition Winner)	Patrick Watson; Holly Miranda; Rita Redshoes; Sweet Billy Pilgrim; Malcontent (SBSR Preload Competition Winner)	John Butler Trio; Wild Beasts; Sharon Jones & The Dap Kings; The Morning Benders; Stereo Parks (SBSR Preload Competition Winner)
@Meco Stage	Richie Hawtin; Marco Carola; Magda	Ricardo Villalobos with Zip; Magazino; João Maria; José Belo; Henriq e Bart Cruz	Laurent Garnier; Rui Vargas and André Cascais; Zé Salvador; Hi-Tech²; Mary B

== 2014 ==
The 20th edition took place at the Herdade do Cabeço da Flauta, near the Meco beach, in Sesimbra, between 16 and 19 July 2014.

	16 July	17 July	18 July	19 July
Super Bock Stage		Disclosure; Massive Attack; Tame Impala; Metronomy; Vintage Trouble	Eddie Vedder; Woodkid; The Legendary Tigerman; Cults	Kasabian; Foals; The Kills; Albert Hammond Jr.; Zé Pedro e Amigos [Tributo a Lou Reed]
EDP Stage		Panda Bear; Jake Bugg; Cat Empire; Erlend Øye; Million Dollar Lips	Cat Power; Sleight Bells; Pulled Apart by Horses; Joe Satriani; For Pete Sake	C2C; Oh Land; Dead Combo; Skaters; Big Church of Fire
Antena 3 Stage	DJ Guga; Miguel Quintão; Álvaro Costa	DJ The Fox; Rui Estêvão / Señor Pelota; Vanessa Augusto / Joana Dias; Frankie Chavez; Ciclo Preparatório	António Freitas; Nuno Calado; Mónica Mendes; Capicua; Emicida; Keep Razors Sharp	Xoices; Gonçalo Castro; Batida + DJ Mpula; José Mariño; NBC

== 2015 ==
The 21st edition took place at Parque das Nações, in Lisbon, between 16 and 18 July 2015.

	16 July	17 July	18 July
Super Bock Stage	Madeon; Sting; Noel Gallagher's High Flying Birds; The Vaccines; Milky Chance	Blur; dEUS; Jorge Palma & Sérgio Godinho; The Drums	Florence + The Machine; FFS; Crystal Fighters; Rodrigo Amarante
EDP Stage	SBTRKT; Little Dragon; Perfume Genius; King Gizzard and the Lizard Wizard; Ostra S.R.	Bombay Bicycle Club; Savages; Kindness; Benjamin Clementine; Sinkane; Isaura	Banda do Mar; Unknown Mortal Orchestra; Palma Violets; Márcia; Modernos; Captain Boy
Carlsberg Stage	Xinobi; Mirror People; Toro y Moi	Gramatik; Stereossauro; MGDRV	Djeff Afrozila; Throes + The Shine; Criolo
Antena 3 Stage	Gala Drop; PZ; Duquesa	Best Youth; Da Chick; White Haus	We Trust; D'Alva; Thunder & Co

== 2016 ==
The 22nd edition took place at Parque das Nações, in Lisbon, on 14, 15 and 16 July 2016.

	14 July	15 July	16 July
Super Bock Stage	The National; Disclosure; The Temper Trap	Massive Attack & Young Fathers; Iggy Pop; Bloc Party	Kendrick Lamar; De La Soul; Orelha Negra
EDP Stage	Jamie xx; Kurt Vile; Villagers; Lucius; Surma	Mac DeMarco; Rhye; Kwabs; Petite Noir; Pás de Problème	GNR - Psicopátria; Capicua; FIDLAR; Kelela; The Parrots
Carlsberg Stage	Riot; DJ Shadow; Bomba Estéreo	Trikk; Moullinex; Lion Babe	Daniel Haaksman; Batida - Uma Lata DJ Set; DJ Ride
Antena 3 Stage	Samuel Úria; peixe:avião; Benjamim; Alek Rein	Capitão Fausto; Glockenwise; Pista; Basset Hounds	"A Purple Experience" by Moullinex; Salto; Mike El Nite; Slow J

== 2017 ==
The 23rd edition took place at Parque das Nações, in Lisbon, on 13, 14 and 15 July 2017.

	13 July	14 July	15 July
Super Bock Stage	Red Hot Chili Peppers; The New Power Generation ft. Bilal; Capitão Fausto	London Grammar; Future; The Gift	Deftones; Foster the People; Fatboy Slim
EDP Stage	The Legendary Tigerman; The Orwells; Boogarins; Kevin Morby; "Alexander Search" (Salvador Sobral with Júlio Resende)	Língua Franca; Akua Naru; Slow J; Jessie Reyez; Pusha T	Taxiwars; James Vincent McMorrow; Bruno Pernadas; Seu Jorge; Silva
Carlsberg Stage	Tuxedo; Moulinex & Xinobi	Celeste/Mariposa; Rocky Marsiano & Meu Kamba Sound; Beatbombers; 99Plajo	Monki; Marquis Hawkes; Magazino
LG Stage by SBSR.FM	Manuel Fúria e os Náufragos; Throes + The Shine; Minta & The Brook Trout	NBC; Keso; Octa Push	Black Bombaim; Sensible Soccers; Stone Dead

== 2018 ==
The 24th edition took place at Parque das Nações, in Lisbon, on 19, 20 and 21 July 2018.

	19 July	20 July	21 July
Super Bock Stage	Justice; The xx; Who The F*ck Is Zé Pedro?	Travis Scott; Anderson Paak & The Free Nationals; Slow J	Benjamin Clementine; La Fura dels Baus; Stormzy; Julian Casablancas + The Voidz
EDP Stage	The Vaccines; Lee Fields & The Expressions; Temples; Parcels; The Parkinsons	Tom Misch; Princess Nokia; Oddisee & Good Company; Profjam; Olivier St. Louis	The The; Sevdaliza; Baxter Dury; Isaura
Sommersby Stage	Songhoy Blues; Mahalia	Pierre Kwenders; The Alchemist	BIG; Sofi Tukker
LG Stage by SBSR.FM	Mirror People; Filipe Sambado & Os Acompanhantes de Luxo; Vaiapraia e as Rainhas do Baile	Ermo; Luís Severo; Virtus	Pop Dell'Arte; Keep Razors Sharp; Sunflowers

== 2019 ==
The 25th edition took place at the Herdade do Cabeço da Flauta, near the Meco beach, in Sesimbra, between 18 and 20 July 2019.

	18 July	19 July	20 July
Super Bock Stage	Lana Del Rey; The 1975; Cat Power; Jungle	Phoenix; Kaytranada; Christine and the Queens; Shame	Migos; Janelle Monáe; Disclosure (DJ Set); ProfJam
EDP Stage	Metronomy; Branko; Dino d'Santiago; Glockenwise; Marlon Williams	Charlotte Gainsbourg; Calexico and Iron & Wine; FKJ; Capitão Fausto; Conjunto Corona	Masego; Superorganism; Gorgon City; Rubel; The Blinders
Sommersby Stage	Conan Osíris; Roosevelt; Sebastian	Ezra Collective; Dâm-Funk; Roméo Elvis	Booka Shade; BaianaSystem; Mike El Nite
LG Stage by SBSR.FM	Sallim; Madrepaz; Grandfather's House	Fugly; Galgo; The Twist Connection	Estraca; TNT; Pedro Mafama

== Cancelled years (2020-2021) ==
The 26th edition of Super Bock Super Rock was scheduled to take place on 16, 17 and 18 July 2020, at the Herdade do Cabeço da Flauta. On 15 May 2020, Música no Coração announced that the 26th edition would be postponed to 2021 due to the Portuguese government's decision to prohibit all large-scale events in the country until 30 September 2020, amid the COVID-19 pandemic.

The 26th edition was then planned to take place between 15 and 17 July 2021, in the same location, with all tickets bought for the 2020 edition still valid for the new dates. On 31 May 2021, Música do Coração once again announced the postponement of the festival, justifying the decision with the disruption in international travel still in effect due to the COVID-19 pandemic, which forced many of the scheduled international artists to postpone their tours to 2022.

== 2022 ==
The 2022 festival was held on 14 to 16 July. It was headlined by ASAP Rocky, Foals, DaBaby, and C. Tangana.

Super Bock Stage	EDP Stage	Somersby Stage	LG Stage by Radio SBSR.FM
14 July
Flume; ASAP Rocky; Leon Bridges; Metronomy; Boy Pablo	Sports Team; Hinds; Los Bitchos; Working Men's Club	Digitalism (DJ set); Jungle (DJ set); David & Miguel	Fred; Conjunto Cuca Monga; Luís Fernandes
15 July
Hot Chip; DaBaby; C. Tangana; Nathy Peluso; Cosmo's Midnight	GoldLink; Silva; Samuel Úria; Baba Ali	Sofi Tukker (DJ set); Daft Funk (Live); Capicua	Rui Vargas; Benji Price; Classe Crua; Pedro de Tróia; Ecto Pluma
16 July
Jamie xx; Foals; Capitão Fausto & Martim Sousa Tavares; Mayra Andrade; Local Natives	Woodkid; Son Lux; Declan McKenna; Ganso	Claptone; Foals (DJ set); Tourist; Lhast	Filipe Karlsson; Lura; Golden Slumbers; Metamito

== 2023 ==
The 2023 festival was held on 13 to 15 July. It was headlined by The Offspring, The 1975, Wu-Tang Clan, and Steve Lacy.

Super Bock Stage	Pull&Bear Stage	Somersby Stage	LG Stage by Radio SBSR.FM
13 July
James Murphy (DJ set); The Offspring; Franz Ferdinand; The Legendary Tigerman	Father John Misty; Black Country, New Road; 070 Shake	2ManyDj's (DJ set); LX-90; Róisín Murphy	noiserv; Tara Perdida; Calua; Nitry
14 July
Charlotte de Witte; The 1975; Wu-Tang Clan; Nile Rodgers & Chic; Sam the Kid with Orchestra and Orelha Negra	Caroline Polachek; Sampa the Great; Benny Sings	Nuno Lopes; DJ Premier; Biia	Holly Hood; Glockenwise; Amaura
15 July
Parov Stelar; Steve Lacy; Kaytranada; Kaleo; Ezra Collective	L'Impératrice; PinkPantheress; Biig Piig; Apart	Blond:ish; Moullinex △ GPU Panic; Chico da Tina	Tomás Wallenstein; Irma; Surma

== 2024 ==
The 2024 festival was held on 18 to 20 July. It was headlined by Måneskin and Stormzy. 21 Savage was supposed to headline, but cancelled due to illness.

Super Bock Stage	Pull&Bear Stage	Somersby Stage
18 July
Nina Kraviz; Måneskin; Royal Blood; Tom Morello; Alice Merton	Marc Rebillet; Will Butler + Sister Squares; Capitão Fausto	Victoria; Anna Prior; New Max
19 July
Black Coffee; Slow J; Papillon; Mahalia	Aminé; Mabel; Kenny Mason	Chromeo; Yen Sung; Gryffin
20 July
Fisher; Stormzy; Vulfpeck; Mind Da Gap	D4vd; Anna Calvi; Hause Plants	Partiboi69; Diana Oliviera; Kneecap
