= NOS Alive line-ups =

Music and arts festival in Algés, municipality of Oeiras, Portugal

NOS Alive is a music and arts festival that takes place in Algés, in the municipality of Oeiras, Portugal, since 2007.

== Oeiras Alive! 07 ==
The first edition of the festival was held between 8 and 10 June 2007. The main attraction were the return of Pearl Jam, Linkin Park and The Smashing Pumpkins to Portugal, and the first time for bands like The Used, The White Stripes and Beastie Boys.

Optimus Stage
8 June	9 June	10 June
Pearl Jam Linkin Park Blasted Mechanism The Used	The Smashing Pumpkins The White Stripes Balla Triángulo de Amor Bizarro	Beastie Boys Da Weasel Donavon Frankenreiter Matisyahu Sam The Kid

Sagres Mini Stage
8 June	9 June	10 June
Shantel e Bucovina Club Orkestar The SoundsThe Rakes Unkle Bob Loto Oioai	Dezperados The Go! Team The Dead 60's Capitão Fantasma Plastica Dapunksportif	Buraka Som Sistema The (International) Noise Conspiracy WrayGunn The Vicious Five Nigga Poison Tora Tora Big Band

== Optimus Alive! 08 ==
The second edition was held between 10 and 12 July 2008. It was the first to have Optimus as the main sponsor. The second edition gained considerable international attention having both Bob Dylan and Neil Young in the line up.

Optimus Stage
10 July	11 July	12 July
Rage Against the Machine The Hives Gogol Bordello The National Spiritualized Galactic Kalashnikov	Bob Dylan Within Temptation Buraka Som Sistema John Butler Trio Nouvelle Vague (cancelled) Kumpania Algazarra	Neil Young Ben Harper & The Innocent Criminals Donavon Frankenreiter Xavier Rudd Bradiggan

Metro Stage
10 July	11 July	12 July
Boys Noize Tiga Hercules and Love Affair Peaches (DJ Set) Cansei de Ser Sexy (Cancelled) MGMT Vampire Weekend Sons of Albion Skip The Use	Sebastian DJ Mehdi Busy P Uffie Feadz Krazy Baldhead Mr.Flash Vicarious Bliss Unfair	MSTRKRFT Brodinski Gossip Róisín Murphy Midnight Juggernauts The Juan Maclean Sizo

== Optimus Alive! 09 ==
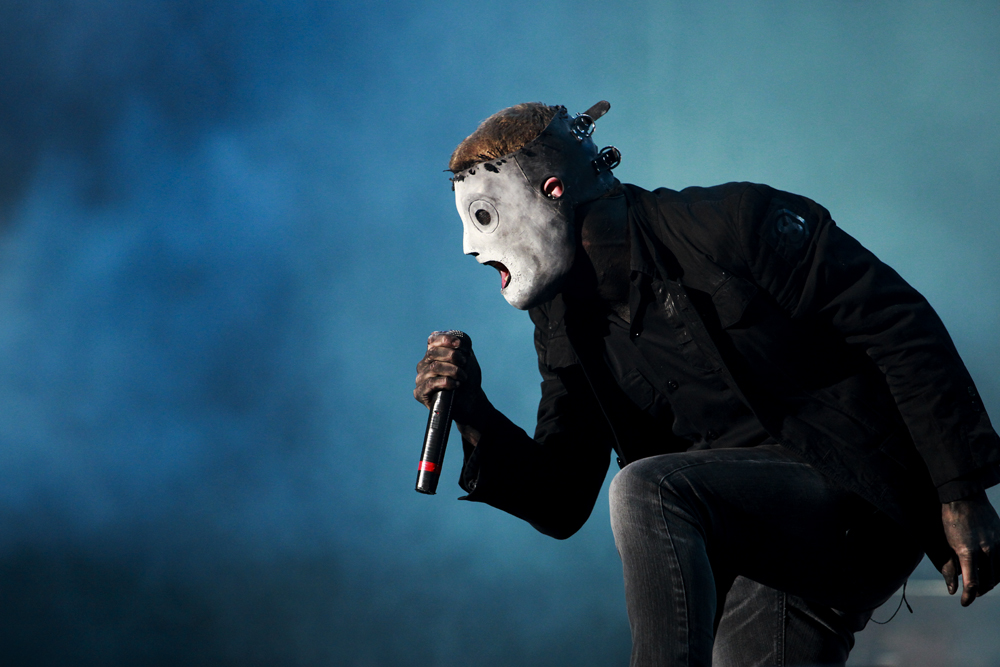
Corey Taylor of Slipknot performing at the festival in 2009

The third edition was held between 9 and 11 July 2009. It is the only edition to have had a day dedicated to heavy metal music in the main stage.

Optimus Stage
9 July	10 July	11 July
Metallica Slipknot Machine Head Lamb of God Mastodon Ramp	The Prodigy Placebo Blasted Mechanism The Kooks Eagles of Death Metal Os Pontos Negros	Dave Matthews Band The Black Eyed Peas Chris Cornell Ayo Boss AC

Super Bock Stage
9 July	10 July	11 July
Erol Alkan Crystal Castles Klaxons TV on the Radio Air Traffic Delphic Silversun Pickups Os Golpes	Zombie Nation The Ting Tings Fischerspooner Does It Offend You, Yeah? Hadouken! Late of the Pier John Is Gone The Gaslight Anthem	Deadmau5 Ghostland Observatory Lykke Li AutoKratz Trouble Andrew Los Campesinos! A Silent Film X-Wife

Optimus Discos Stage
9 July	10 July	11 July
Mr Mitsuhirato Nuno Lopes The Vicious Five Tiguana Bibles The Bombazines Mazgani	Zig Zag Warriors Coldfinger DJ Ride Bezegol Youthless	DJ Kitten Sofia M Linda Martini Madame Godard The Pragmatic Olive Tree Dance

== Optimus Alive! 10 ==
The fourth edition was held between 8 and 10 July 2010.

Optimus Stage
8 July	9 July	10 July
Faith No More Kasabian Alice in Chains Moonspell Biffy Clyro	Deftones Skunk Anansie Manic Street Preachers Mão Morta Jet	Pearl Jam LCD Soundsystem Gogol Bordello Dropkick Murphys Gomez

Super Bock Stage
8 July	9 July	10 July
Burns Calvin Harris La Roux The xx Florence + the Machine Devendra Banhart The Drums Local Natives	Steve Aoki The Bloody Beetroots Death Crew 77 Booka Shade Gossip New Young Pony Club The Maccabees Holy Ghost! Hurts	Boys Noize Crookers Simian Mobile Disco Peaches The Big Pink Miike Snow Sean Riley & The Slowriders Girls

Optimus Clubbing Stage
8 July	9 July	10 July
Planet Turbo Presents:Proxy (Live) Tiga Boy 8-Bit Matias Aguayo Band (Live) Aeroplane Villa Nah (Live) Jori Hulkkonen Shit Robot Youthless	Enchufada Showcase: Laidback Luke Benga Buraka Som Sistema (DJ Set) Sinden Zombies For Money Octa Push (Live) Macacos do Chinês (DJ Set) PAUS Enchufada DJ's	The Legendary Tigerman Presents: Homens da Luta The Bellrays Phoebe Killdeer & The Short Straws Micro Audio Waves The Legendary Tigerman presents Femina with Asia Argento, Maria de Medeiros, Peaches (musician), Rita Redshoes, Lisa Kekaula, Cibelle, Phoebe Killdeer, Becky Lee, Claudia Efe, Mafalda Nascimento Cibelle Becky Lee & Drunkfoot Noiserv Enday

== Optimus Alive '11 ==
The fifth edition took place between 6 and 9 July 2011. To celebrate the fifth anniversary of the festival, a fourth day was added on Wednesday (6 July), in which Coldplay were the headliners.

Optimus Stage
6 July	7 July	8 July	9 July
Coldplay Blondie Grouplove The Twilight Singers	Foo Fighters Iggy & The Stooges Xutos e Pontapés My Chemical Romance Jimmy Eat World	Thirty Seconds to Mars The Chemical Brothers You Me at Six (canceled) The Pretty Reckless (canceled)Klepht (canceled)	Jane's Addiction Duck Sauce Paramore Kaiser Chiefs White Lies Lululemon

Super Bock Stage
6 July	7 July	8 July	9 July
Patrick Wolf James Blake Anna Calvi These New Puritans Example Avi Buffalo The Naked and Famous Mona	Primal Scream The Bloody Beetroots Seasick Steve Kele Okereke Teratron Os Golpes Everything Everything Bombay Bicycle Club Crocodiles	Grinderman Thievery Corporation Fleet Foxes Digitalism Slimmy Friendly Fires Angus & Julia Stone Massay	TV on the Radio Dizzee Rascal Foals A-Trak Fake Blood Orelha Negra Linda Martini WU LYF Stereopack

Optimus Clubbing Stage
6 July	7 July	8 July	9 July
Amor Fúria Showcase:Salto Feromona Os Velhos Smix Smox Smux Os Capitães da Areia Manuel Fúria e os Naufrágios Asterisco Cardinal Bomba Caveira O Deserto Branco O Verão Azul	Enchufada Showcase: Diplo Buraka Som Sistema Goose Carte Blanche Joker feat. Nomad Spoek Mathambo Wildlife! Diamond Bass Da Chick The Yardangs	Dim Mak Showcase:Steve Aoki Afrojack Sidney Samson Atari Teenage Riot Uffie Congorock Autoerotique Mustard Pimp MotorTai Scanners Rob Roy New Ivory	Boys Noize Records Showcase: Boys Noize Erol Alkan Housemeister Spank Rock Djedjotronic Gold Panda Feadz Strip Steve Shadow Dancer

== Optimus Alive '12 ==
The sixth edition of the festival was held between 13 and 15 July 2012. It drew crowds of more than 55,000 people and featured The Stone Roses, The Cure and Radiohead as headliners,

Optimus Alive '12 was nominated for several European Festival Awards - Best Major Festival, Best European Festival Line-up and Artists' Favourite Festival - but did not win in any category.

Optimus Stage
13 July	14 July	15 July
The Stone Roses Justice Snow Patrol Refused Danko Jones	The Cure Morcheeba Mumford & Sons Noah and the Whale We Trust	Radiohead Caribou The Kooks PAUS

Heineken Stage
13 July	14 July	15 July
Death in Vegas Zola Jesus Buraka Som Sistema Santigold LMFAO Miúda Dum Dum Girls The Parkinsons The Royal Blasphemy	Blasted Mechanism Sebastian Katy B Tricky Awolnation The Antlers Here We Go Magic Big Deal Lisa Hannigan	Metronomy The Kills SBTRKT Mazzy Star The Maccabees Warpaint Miles Kane Eli "Paperboy" Reed

Optimus Clubbing Stage
13 July	14 July	15 July
Brodinski Planningtorock Miss Kittin Busy P Gesaffelstein Club Cheval Logo Aeroplane Rory Phillips	James Murphy + Pat Mahoney Art Department Visionquest Guy Gerber Shonky & Dan Gherbacia Ninja Kore	Seth Troxler Moullinex + Xinobi Carbon Airways B Fachada Márcia Best Youth Laia

== Optimus Alive '13 ==
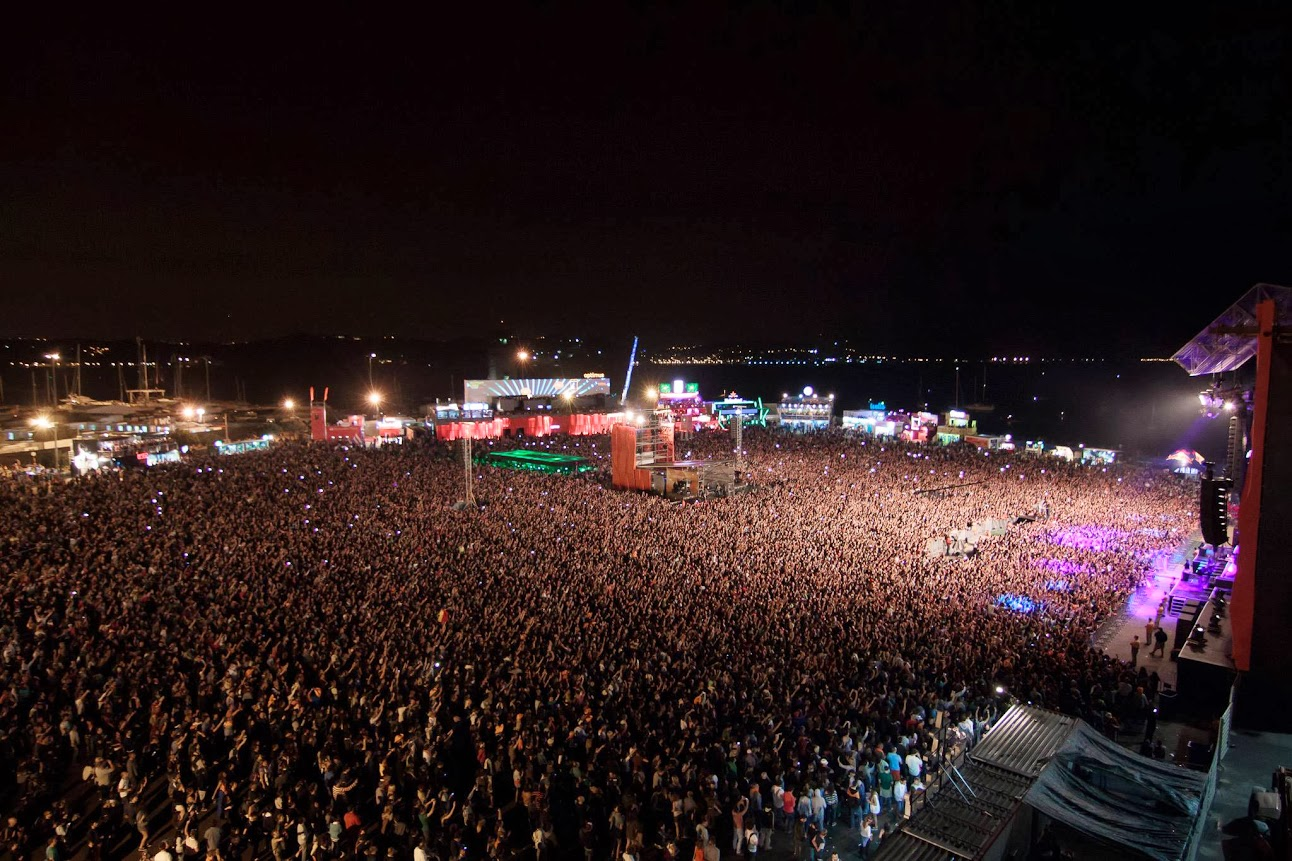
NOS Alive crowd during Depeche Mode performance in 2013.

The seventh edition of the festival took place between 12 and 14 July 2013.

Optimus Stage
12 July	13 July	14 July
Green Day Steve Aoki Two Door Cinema Club Biffy Clyro Stereophonics	Depeche Mode 2manydjs Editors Jurassic 5 Oquestrada	Kings of Leon Phoenix Tame Impala Jake Bugg Linda Martini

Heineken Stage
12 July	13 July	14 July
Marky Ramone's Blitzkrieg with Andrew W.K. Crystal Fighters Vampire Weekend Edward Sharpe & The Magnetic Zeros Dead Combo Japandroids Deap Vally Jamie N Commons Quelle Dead Gazelle	Crystal Castles Hercules & Love Affair SoundSystem The Legendary Tigerman Jamie Lidell Capitão Fausto Rhye Wild Belle DIIV Oeiras Band Sessions	The Bloody Beetroots Django Django Band of Horses Alt-J Twin Shadow Of Monsters and Men Brass Wires Orchestra Tribes Capitão Ortense

Optimus Clubbing Stage
12 July	13 July	14 July
Redlight Mosca Disclosure Dusky Jessie Ware Shadow Child Huxley AlunaGeorge Gold Panda Two Inch Punch	Dezperados Matias Aguayo feat. Alejandro Paz Metro Area Flume Yen Sung How to Dress Well Switchst(D)ance Time for T	Seth Troxler Alex Metric Brodinski + Gesaffelstein White Haus (live band) Daniel Avery Blaya Zé Pedro Moura Max Drum Mad Called Honey

== NOS Alive '14 ==
In 2014 the festival was re-branded as NOS Alive. The eighth edition of the festival took place between 10 and 12 July 2014.

NOS Stage
10 July	11 July	12 July
Arctic Monkeys Interpol Imagine Dragons The Lumineers Ben Howard	The Black Keys Buraka Som Sistema MGMT The Last Internationale The Vicious Five	The Libertines Foster The People Bastille The Black Mamba You Can't Win, Charlie Brown

Heineken Stage
10 July	11 July	12 July
Booka Shade Parov Stelar Band Kelis Elbow Tiago Bettencourt The 1975 Temples Noiserv Jacarés	Caribou SBTRKT Au Revoir Simone We Trust Sam Smith Parquet Courts For Pete Sake Russian Red Allen Stone	Nicolas Jaar Chet Faker Daughter PAUS Unknown Mortal Orchestra The War on Drugs Cass McCombs Tom Mash The 7Riots

NOS Clubbing
10 July	11 July	12 July
Jamie xx Daphni Pearson Sound Pantha Du Prince MidlandTasker	Branko Boys Noize Gunrose Diplo Dillon Francis Toddla T D'Alva com Gospel Collective Kuroma Matilha	A-Trak Nina Kraviz Jungle Phantogram Cherub SOHN Drenge Caelum's Edge Gin Party Sound System

Jardim Caixa - Comedy Stage
10 July	11 July	12 July
Aldo Lima Salvador Martinha Luís Franco-Bastos Manuel Marques Rui Cruz Luísa Barbosa (host)	César Mourão Eduardo Madeira Los Madraços Tânia Barbosa Zé Beirão Catarina Matos (host)	Nilton Luis Filipe Borges António Raminhos Hugo Sousa João Carlos Cunha - O Humorista Guilherme Fonseca (host)

== NOS Alive '15 ==
NOS Alive '15 was the ninth edition of the festival and took place between 9 and 11 July 2015.

NOS Stage
9 July	10 July	11 July
Muse alt-J Ben Harper & The Innocent Criminals James Bay The Wombats	The Prodigy Mumford & Sons Sheppard Marmozets Blasted Mechanism	Disclosure Chet Faker Sam Smith Counting Crows HMB

Heineken Stage
9 July	10 July	11 July
Flume Django Django Cavaliers of Fun Metronomy Capitão Fausto Young Fathers Señores Galgo	Róisín Murphy James Blake Future Islands The Ting Tings Bleachers Kodaline Cold Specks Bear's Den Daniel Kemish	Chromeo Flight Facilities Azealia Banks The Jesus and Mary Chain Mogwai Dead Combo Sleaford Mods Soldier's Heart That Rebellion

NOS Clubbing
9 July	10 July	11 July
Julio Bashmore X-Wife TigaBreach Benji B Eclair Fifi Cityspark	Magazino Moullinex Batida DJ Kamala Capicua Skip&Die Dianna Sousa	Miss Kittin Erol Alkan Louisahhh!!! SUPER DISCOUNT 3DJEDJOTRONIC Riton (DJ Set) Alex Metric B2B Aeroplane Feadz John Ascia

Raw Coreto by G-Star Raw
9 July	10 July	11 July
Nice Weather For Ducks DJ Zé Pedro Basset Hounds Light Gun Fire Les Crazy Coconuts	DJ Fernando Alvim Tape Junk Los Waves Prana Naked Affair	DJ Pedro Ramos Raury Tracy Vandal Cave Story Pista

Jardim Caixa - Comedy Stage
9 July	10 July	11 July
The Boy With Tape On His FaceManuel João Vieira Diogo Faro Bumerangue Pedro Durão Rita Camarneiro (Host)	Herman José Francisco Menezes Jean Carreira Hugo Rosa Rui Xará Jorge Picoto Rita de la Rochezoire (Host)	Rui Unas feat. DJ Van Breda Rui Sinel de Cordes Carlos Moura Paulo Almeida Irmãos Machado Inês Aires Pereira (Host)

== NOS Alive '16 ==
NOS Alive '16 was the tenth edition of the festival and took place between 7 and 9 July 2016.

NOS Stage
7 July	8 July	9 July
The Chemical Brothers Pixies Robert Plant and the Sensational Space Shifters Biffy Clyro The 1975	Radiohead Tame Impala Foals Years & Years	Arcade Fire M83 Band Of Horses Agir Vetusta Morla

Heineken Stage
7 July	8 July	9 July
Wolf Alice John Grant Vintage Trouble 2manyDJs (DJ Set) Soulwax Sean Riley & The Slowriders L.A. The Happy Mess	Hot Chip Two Door Cinema Club Father John Misty Courtney Barnett Jagwar Ma Carlão Soulvenir	Ratatat Grimes Calexico José González Little Scream 99Plajo PAUS Four Tet Them Flying Monkeys

NOS Clubbing
7 July	8 July	9 July
Junior Boys Branko SG Lewis Bob Moses Xinobi Throes + The Shine Baywaves	NBC, Sir Scratch & Bob da Rage Sense Mundo Segundo & Sam The Kid Da Chick HMB, DJ Kamala & Filipe Gonçalves MGDRV Rocky Marsiano & Meu Mamba Sound DJ Kamala Vizinhos do Lado	Boys Noize Club Cheval Mirror People Francis DaleIsaura Hana Whales

Jardim Caixa - Comedy Stage
7 July	8 July	9 July
John Cooper Clarke Salvador Martinha feat. Tatanka Môce Dum Cabreste Pedro Figueiredo Carlos Vidal Soraia Carrega (Host)	Pedro Tochas João Seabra Diogo Batáguas David Almeida Joana Machado Inês Aires Pereira (Host)	Top Genius - Nuno Markl e Vasco Palmeirim Altos e Baixos - Joana Marques e Daniel Leitão António Machado Planeta Fluffen João Paulo Sousa Rita Camarneiro (Host)

== NOS Alive '17 ==
NOS Alive '17 was the tenth edition of the festival and took place between 7 and 9 July 2017.

NOS Stage
6 July	7 July	8 July
The Weeknd The xx Phoenix Alt-J You Can't Win, Charlie Brown	Foo Fighters The Kills The Courteeners The Cult Tiago Bettencourt	Depeche Mode Imagine Dragons Kodaline The Black Mamba

Heineken Stage
6 July	7 July	8 July
Glass Animals Bonobo Royal Blood Ryan Adams Blossoms Rhye Gelpi Veintiuno	Floating Points Parov Stelar Local Natives Wild Beasts Warpaint Savages LOT Eden Lewis	Peaches The Avalanches Cage the Elephant Fleet Foxes Spoon Benjamin Booker Plastic People Monstro

NOS Clubbing
6 July	7 July	8 July
Carlos Cardoso Batida António Bastos Jessy Lanza Karlon Niles Mavis Waves Rita & O Revólver	Bandido$ Ramos VS Mr. Mitsuhirato Bispo Modernos Pega Monstro Pista Cave Story Kilimanjaro	Trikk Switchdance 10Cotexas Mike El Nite Marvel Lima Mr. Herbert Quain GPU Panic Ghost Wavves

Coreto by Arruada
6 July	7 July	8 July
Riot Kking Kong Dotorado Pro Izem Rastronaut	Mai Kino Golden Slumbers Lince Fábia Maia Calcutá	Scúru Fitchádu Benjamim Filho da Mãe Filipe Sambando Duquesa

EDP Fado Café
6 July	7 July	8 July
Blues' N' Swing Miguel Araújo Mário Pacheco	Blues' N' Swing Carminho Janeiro	Blues' N' Swing Tasca do Chico

Comedy Stage
6 July	7 July	8 July
Daniel Sloss Aldo Lima Guilherme Geirinhas Falta de Chá Francisco Salema Garção	Nilton Filomena Cautela Manos Duarte Manuel Cardoso Carlos Pereira	Salvador Martinha Hugo Sousa Carlos Coutinho Vilhena Guilherme Fonseca David Cristina

== NOS Alive '18 ==
NOS Alive '18 was the 11th edition of the festival and took place between 12 and 14 July 2018.

The Kooks had to cancel their show the day prior to the event, due to Luke Pritchard, the band's lead singer, still being affected by bronchitis. They were replaced by Blossoms, who had played in the previous edition of the festival.

NOS Stage
12 July	13 July	14 July
Arctic Monkeys Snow Patrol Nine Inch Nails Bryan Ferry Miguel Araújo	Queens of the Stone Age Two Door Cinema Club The National The Kooks Black Rebel Motorcycle Club Kaleo	Pearl Jam MGMT Jack White Franz Ferdinand Alice in Chains The Last Internationale

Sagres Stage
12 July	13 July	14 July
Blasted Mechanism Sampha Khalid Friendly Fires Wolf Alice Jain Juana Molina Vermú	Chvrches Future Islands Rag'n'Bone Man Portugal. The Man Yo La Tengo Eels Japandroids Sound Bullet	Perfume Genius At the Drive-In Mallu Magalhães Clap Your Hands Say Yeah Real Estate Marmozets Churky

== NOS Alive '19 ==
NOS Alive '19 was the 12th edition of the festival and took place between 11 and 13 July 2019.

NOS Stage
11 July	12 July	13 July
The Cure Mogwai Ornatos Violeta Weezer Linda Martini	Vampire Weekend Gossip Greta Van Fleet Primal Scream Perry Farrell's Kind Heaven Orchestra	The Smashing Pumpkins The Chemical Brothers Bon Iver Tom Walker Vetusta Morla The Gift

Sagres Stage
12 July	13 July	14 July
Hot Chip Robyn Loyle Carner Jorja Smith Xavier Rudd Sharon Van Etten Honney.azz x b-mywingz	Cut Copy Deejay Kamala Grace Jones Tash Sultana Johnny Marr Ry X Pip Blom Etc	The Blaze Thom Yorke Marina Idles Gavin James Rolling Blackouts Coastal Fever Beluga

== NOS Alive '20 (cancelled) ==
The 2020 edition of NOS Alive was scheduled to take place between 8 and 11 July 2020. On 19 May 2020, the festival was cancelled due to the Portuguese government's decision to prohibit all large-scale events in the country until 30 September 2020, amid the COVID-19 pandemic. The planned lineup for that year's edition was the following:

NOS Stage
8 July	9 July	10 July	11 July
Kendrick Lamar Jorja Smith	Taylor Swift (cancelled on 17 April 2020) Alt-J Khalid The Lumineers Nothing but Thieves	Billie Eilish Faith No More Cage the Elephant Anderson .Paak & The Free Nationals Finneas	The Strokes Da Weasel Two Door Cinema Club Haim Manel Cruz

Sagres Stage
8 July	9 July	10 July	11 July
Black Pumas Fontaines D.C. Charli XCX Easy Life	Parov Stelar Seasick Steve Inhaler Glass Animals London Grammar	Angel Olsen Caribou Hobo Johnson and The Lovemakers Tom Misch Sea Girls Moses Sumney	Parcels Wolf Parade Alec Benjamin Petit Biscuit

== NOS Alive '21 (cancelled) ==
After the cancellation of the previous edition, NOS Alive '21 was scheduled to take place on the 7th, 8th, 9th and 10 July 2021, with all previous bought tickets valid for the new dates or refunded. In early May 2021, Everything is New's CEO, Álvaro Covões, expressed his doubts regarding the execution of the festival that year due to the COVID-19 pandemic. The edition was eventually cancelled on 20 May 2021, with all previously bought tickets valid for NOS Alive '22.

Before the cancellation, the planned lineup was the following:

NOS Stage
7 July	8 July	9 July	10 July
	alt-J Nothing but Thieves The War on Drugs The Lumineers Red Hot Chili Peppers		Da Weasel Two Door Cinema Club Manel Cruz The Strokes Haim

Sagres Stage
7 July	8 July	9 July	10 July
Black Pumas Fontaines D.C.	Seasick Steve	Angel Olsen Hobo Johnson and The Lovemakers Tom Misch Sea Girls Moses Sumney	Caribou Parcels Alec Benjamin La Roux

== NOS Alive '22 ==
On 20 May 2021, after the cancellation of that year's edition, the dates for NOS Alive '22 were publicly released: 6, 7, 8 and 9 July 2022.

NOS Stage
6 July	7 July	8 July	9 July
Stromae; The Strokes; The War on Drugs; Jungle; Mallu Magalhães	alt-J; Florence and the Machine; Jorja Smith; Celeste; Os Quatro e Meia	Metallica; Royal Blood; AJ Tracey; Don Broco	Two Door Cinema Club; Imagine Dragons; Da Weasel; Haim; Mother Mother

Sagres Stage
6 July	7 July	8 July	9 July
Parov Stelar; Fontaines D.C. Modest Mouse; Balthazar; Lefty	Bateu Matou; Dino d'Santiago; Nilüfer Yanya; Seasick Steve; Inhaler; Alec Benjamin; Gui Aly	Pedro da Linha B2B Riot; M.I.A. Três Tristes Tigres; St. Vincent; Nicki Nicole; Sea Girls; Alta Avenue	Caribou; Parcels; Manel Cruz; Phoebe Bridgers; Hope Tala; Los Invaders; Tourjets

== NOS Alive '23 ==
The fifteenth edition of the festival was held on 6 to 8 July 2023.

NOS Stage
6 July	7 July	8 July
Red Hot Chili Peppers; The Black Keys; Puscifer; The Driver Era	Lil Nas X; Arctic Monkeys; Lizzo; Idles; Linda Martini	Rüfüs Du Sol; Sam Smith; Queens of the Stone Age; Machine Gun Kelly; Carolina Deslandes & Bárbara Tinoco

Heineken Stage
6 July	7 July	8 July
Xinovi (Live); Spoon; Ibibio Sound Machine; Jacob Collier; Men I Trust; Femme Falafel; Bombazine	Morad; Sylvan Esso; Jorge Palma; Girl in Red; City and Colour; The Amazons	Omah Lay; Branko; Rina Sawayama; Tash Sultana; Angel Olsen; King Princess; Lucy Val

WTF Clubbing
6 July	7 July	8 July
Nidia; Kelman Duran & Pedro Da Linha; Throes + The Shine; Yaya Bey; Club Makumba; Ana Lua Caiano; Mr Cool B2B Mr Hyde	Bashment; Papillon; Yendry; Lhast; Neyna; Xtinto; Sleepytheprince; Dj Stá	Maelstrom & Louisahhh; Taaliah; Boys Noize; Yen Sung; Kelly Lee Owens; Krystal Klear; Third Son; Storm Mollison
