= Vilar de Mouros Festival =

Music festival

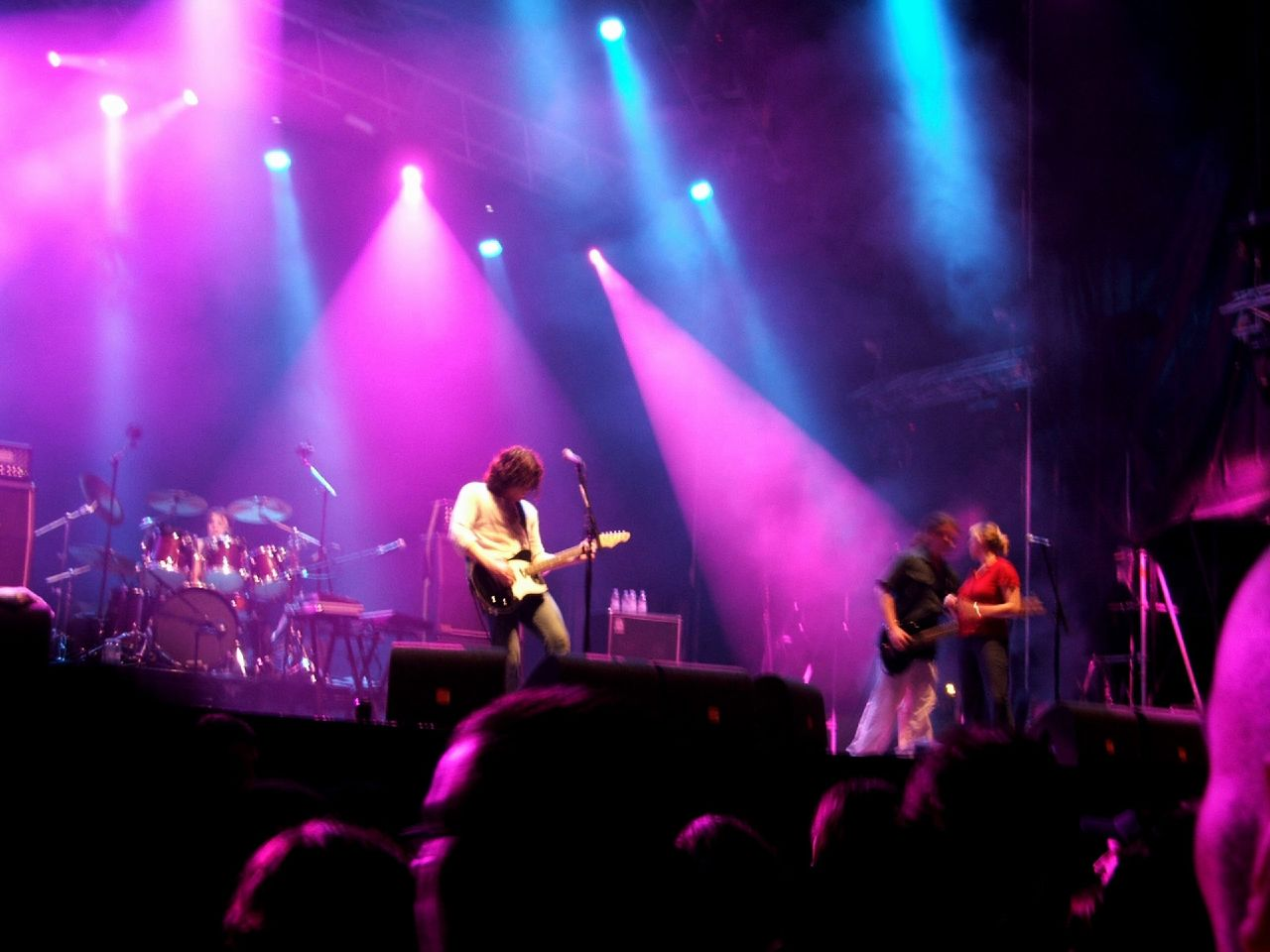
- Anathema playing in the main stage, in 2005
- Genre: Rock, pop
- Dates: 4th weekend of August (since 2016)
- Locations: Vilar de Mouros, Caminha, Portugal
- Years active: 1965–1968 (as a folk festival), 1971, 1982, 1996, 1999–2006, 2014, 2016–present
- Founders: António Barge
- Website: festivalvilardemouros.pt

The Vilar de Mouros Festival, currently named CA Vilar de Mouros for sponsorship reasons, is a music festival that takes place in Vilar de Mouros, in the municipality of Caminha, in northwestern Portugal. It is the oldest rock festival in Portugal and the Iberian Peninsula. Its 1971 edition, the first as a rock festival, has been called the "Portuguese Woodstock".

Since 2016, it is organized by the event company Surprise & Expectation.

== History ==
=== Beginnings as a folk festival (1965–1968) ===
The Vilar de Mouros Festival was created in 1965 as an event for traditional folk music from the Alto Minho and Galicia regions. It was founded by António Barge, a medical doctor born and raised in Vilar de Mouros.

In the following two years, the festival was organized annually and kept its focus on traditional folk music. In 1968, Barge decided to expand its musical scope and invited artists outside of the region. Folk singer-songwriter José Afonso and guitarist Carlos Paredes were the most notorious artists that performed in that edition. Around 15,000 people attended during the two days of the festival.

After the 1968 edition, Barge opted for not organizing the festival in the next two years, in order to prepare a bigger and more eclectic festival. He would be helped by a team of volunteers and his family.

=== 1971 edition ===
The 1971 edition of the Vilar de Mouros Festival was the first to feature rock music artists. Barge wanted to book high-profile rock artists from abroad, at some point considering The Beatles and The Rolling Stones, but The Beatles would disband in 1970 and The Rolling Stones did not have available dates to go to Portugal. The international artists booked would end up being Elton John and Manfred Mann's Earth Band.

The festival took place during three weekends, between 31 July to 15 August. The first weekend was dedicated to classical music and featured the National Republican Guard band. The rock concerts took place on the second weekend, on 7 and 8 August. Elton John and Mannfred Mann were the headliners, and Portuguese acts, such as Quarteto 1111 and Sindicato, composed the rest of the lineup. On the final weekend, fado singer Amália Rodrigues and Angolan band Duo Ouro Negro performed.

It is reported that at least 30,000 people attended the festival. Some of the young people attending the festival were described as having "extravagant clothing, long hair and a hippie and libertine spirit". José Cid, who performed there as a member of Quarteto 1111, said that "never was something like it seen in Portugal. We would go bath naked in the river and we would smoke some stuff. It was a moment of total freedom". There were also reports of pillaging of cornfields in the proximity from attendees wanting to eat, due to the structural problems inside the festival.

In 1971, Portugal was not a democratic country and control and censorship of the arts were common. At least one agent from the DGS (formerly PIDE, Portugal's secret police during the Estado Novo) was present at the festival, and his report from the event is now disclosed.

The festival ended up being a financial disaster, leaving a debt of over 5,000 euros. As a consequence, the Barge family decided not to organize the festival again.

=== 1982 edition ===
In 1982, the Caminha municipality took the initiative to organize a new edition of the Vilar de Mouros festival. The festival had a duration of nine days, between 31 July and 8 August, and featured bands such as U2, Echo and the Bunnymen and The Stranglers.

Constant schedule changes and divergences between the organizers, program managers and producers led a newspaper at the time to call this edition "the festival of bummers". Once again, the festival ended with big financial losses, and the Caminha municipality scrapped its plans for new editions of the festival.

Nevertheless, the 1982 Vilar de Mouros festival is considered one of the most important festivals ever organized in Portugal.

=== 1996 edition ===
The festival returned in 1996 as a celebration of 25 years since the iconic 1971 edition. It was organized by the live entertainment company Música no Coração and took place between 9 and 11 August. The Stone Roses, The Young Gods, Madredeus and Xutos & Pontapés were some of the bands that took part in this edition.

The lack of quality of the festival grounds forced another stop of its organization for some years.

=== 1999–2006 ===
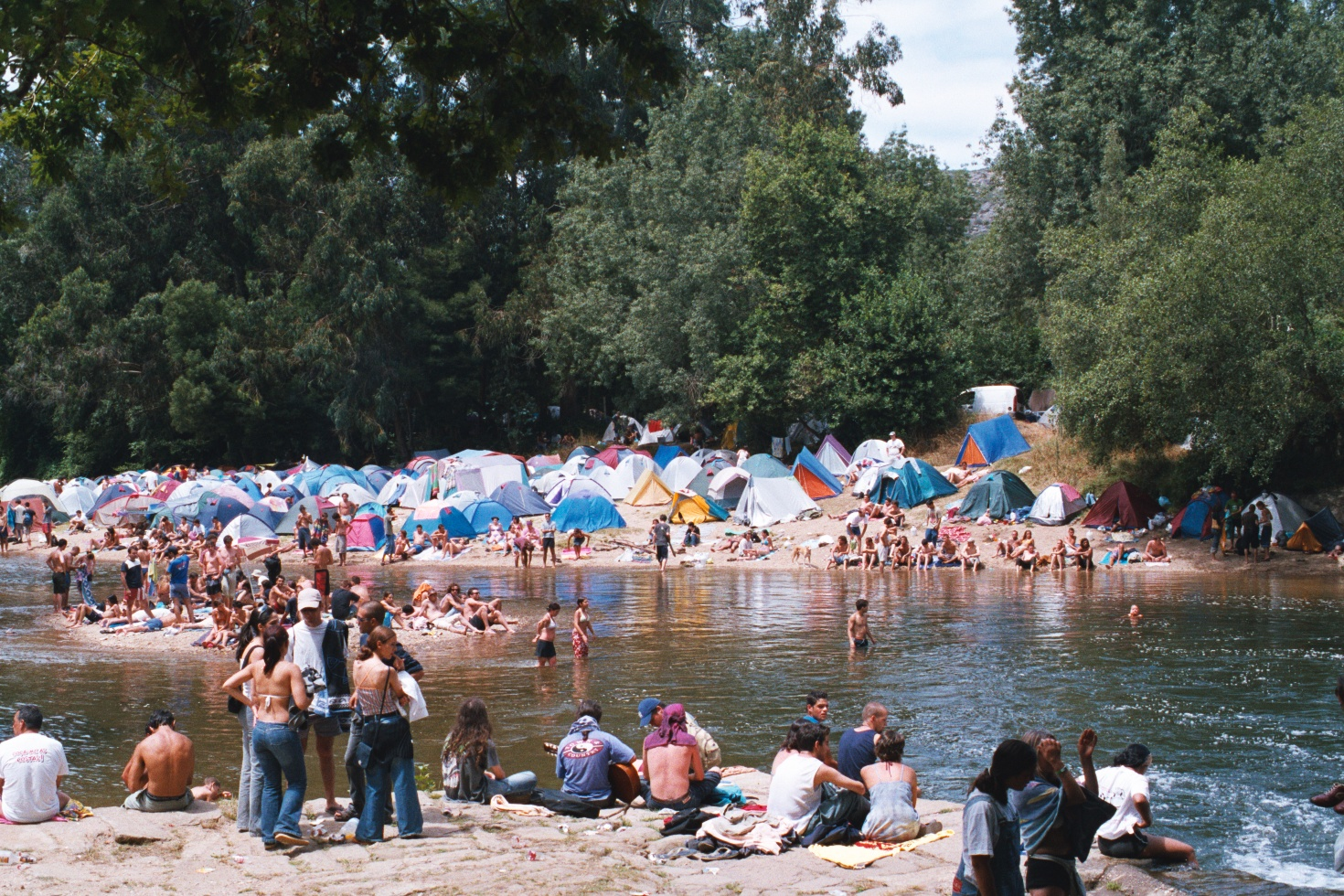
Attendees by the Coura river during the festival, in 2003

The civil parish of Vilar de Mouros, Música no Coração and Portoeventos signed a deal regarding the terrains for the festival that permitted the festival to be organized between 1999 and 2004. Some highlights from these years were concerts by Bob Dylan, Peter Gabriel, Neil Young, The Pretenders, Alanis Morissette, Iron Maiden, Skunk Anansie, Ben Harper, Manu Chao, UB40, Joe Cocker, The Cure, Rammstein, Robert Plant, Sonic Youth, Lamb, Beck, Bush, Sepultura and Guano Apes.

At the end of the first concession contract in 2004, Música no Coração and Portoeventos ended their partnership. Portoeventos signed a new contract with the civil parish of Vilar de Mouros, without consultation from the Caminha municipality. Displeased with the lack of involvement, the Caminha municipality cut its logistic support for the festival. The festival went on for two more years, and a 2007 edition was being planned, but ended up being cancelled.

=== 2014 edition ===
In July 2013, the municipality of Caminha announced that the festival would be revived in 2014. The 2014 edition was considered unsuccessful, failing to attract large crowds. In 2015, the festival was again cancelled, due to difficulties from the organizers.

=== 2016–present ===
Since 2016, the festival has been organized annually. The 2020 edition was cancelled due to the COVID-19 pandemic. In 2021 a special edition celebrated the 50th anniversary of 1971 edition with only 400 free tickets available, due to restrictions caused by the pandemic.

== Lineups ==
Year	Dates	Main sponsor	Headliners	Notable acts
1968				José Afonso, Carlos Paredes, Adriano Correia de Oliveira, Quinteto Académico, Shegundo Galarza
1971	31 July - 15 August		Elton John, Mannfred Mann's Earth Band, Amália Rodrigues	Celos, Duo Ouro Negro, Pentágono, Pop Five Music Inc., Quarteto 1111, Sindicato
1982	31 July - 8 August		The Stranglers, The Gist, U2, Sun Ra Arkestra, A Certain Ratio, The Durutti Column	Carlos Paredes, Echo & the Bunnymen, GNR, Johnny Copeland, Mikis Theodorakis, Renaissance, Rip Rig + Panic, Vitorino
1996	9-11 August	Super Bock	Pato Banton, The Stone Roses, Madredeus	Da Weasel, Primitive Reason, Tara Perdida, Xutos & Pontapés, The Young Gods
1999	20-22 August	Super Bock	Goldie, The Pretenders, Tindersticks	Catatonia, Eagle-Eye Cherry, Joe Strummer, Mad Professor, Madder Rose, Silence 4, Soul Coughing
2000	14-16 July	Super Bock	Alanis Morissette, Skunk Anansie, Iron Maiden	Frank Black, Lúcia Moniz, Rollins Band, Rui Veloso, Sonic Youth, The Priory of Brion feat. Robert Plant
2001	13-15 July	Super Bock	Neil Young & Crazy Horse, Ben Harper, Xutos & Pontapés	Beck, Clã, Fantômas, Megadeth, Sérgio Godinho
2002	12-14 July	Super Bock	Manu Chao, Rammstein, UB40	Bush, Cake, Da Weasel, Lamb, Primitive Reason
2003	18-20 July	Super Bock	Guano Apes, David Fonseca, Public Enemy	Blasted Mechanism, HIM, Rufus Wainwright, Sepultura, Tricky
2004	16-18 July		The Chemical Brothers, The Cure, Bob Dylan	Clã, Ice-T, Macy Gray, Peter Gabriel, PJ Harvey
2005	28-31 July		Nightwish, Peter Murphy, Joss Stone, Robert Plant	Anathema, Blues Explosion, Echo & The Bunnymen, Faithless, Joe Cocker, Jorge Palma, Porcupine Tree, Within Temptation
2006	21-23 July		Sepultura, Cradle of Filth, Iggy & The Stooges	Dead Combo, The Durutti Column, Mojave 3, Moonspell, Soulfly, Tricky, Xutos & Pontapés
2014	31 July - 2 August		UB40, The Stranglers, Guano Apes	Deolinda, La Unión, Pedro Abrunhosa, Tricky, Xutos & Pontapés
2016	25-27 August		Peter Murphy, Orchestral Manoeuvres in the Dark, The Waterboys	António Zambujo, Blasted Mechanism, David Fonseca, Happy Mondays, The Legendary Tigerman, Linda Martini, Milky Chance, Peter Hook and the Light, Tindersticks
2017	24-26 August	EDP	The Jesus and Mary Chain, George Ezra, The Psychedelic Furs	2ManyDJs (DJ set), Morcheeba, Primal Scream, Salvador Sobral, The Boomtown Rats, The Dandy Warhols, The Mission
2018	23-25 August	EDP	The Pretenders, Incubus, James	Crystal Fighters, David Fonseca, Deus, Editors, GNR, John Cale, Kitty, Daisy & Lewis, Peter Murphy, Public Image Ltd, The Human League
2019	22-24 August	EDP	Manic Street Preachers, The Offspring, Prophets of Rage	Anna Calvi, Fischer-Z, Gang of Four, Gogol Bordello, Therapy?, Linda Martini, Nitzer Ebb, Skunk Anansie, The Cult, The House of Love, The Sisters of Mercy, The Wedding Present
2020	Cancelled	EDP		
2021	Cancelled	EDP		
2022	25-27 August	EDP	Placebo, Simple Minds, Iggy Pop	Battles, Bauhaus, Black Rebel Motorcycle Club, Blind Zero, Clawfinger, Gary Numan, Suede, Tara Perdida, The Legendary Tigerman
2023	23-26 August	Crédito Agrícola	Limp Bizkit, The Prodigy, Pendulum, James	Apocalyptica, Enter Shikari, Guano Apes, Millencolin, Ornatos Violeta, Peaches, The Bloody Beetroots (DJ set), The Last Internationale, Within Temptation, Xutos & Pontapés
2024	21-24 August	Crédito Agrícola	Amalia Hoje, The Cult, Die Antwoord, The Darkness	Capitão Fausto, Crystal Fighters, David Fonseca, Delfins, GNR, Moonspell, Ornatos Violeta, Soulfly, The Libertines, The Legendary Tigerman, The Waterboys, Xutos & Pontapés

== See also ==
- List of historic rock festivals
