= Paredes de Coura Festival =

Music festival in Paredes de Coura, Portugal

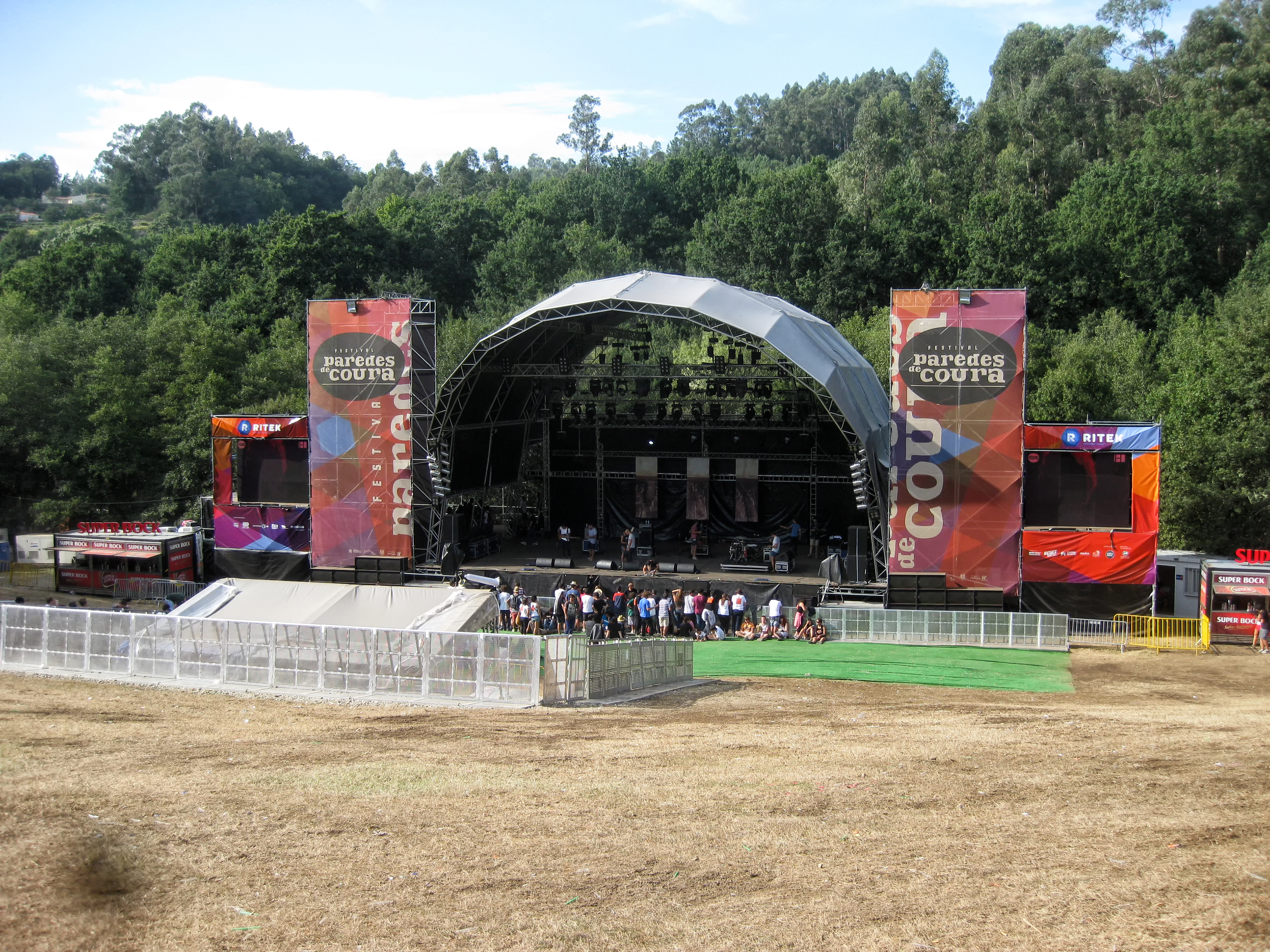
- Main stage in 2011
- Genre: Rock, alternative rock, pop, electronic
- Dates: August
- Locations: Praia do Taboão, Paredes de Coura, Portugal
- Years active: 1993–present
- Attendance: 115,000 in 2023
- Capacity: 20,000 (per day, in 2006 and 2013)
- Website: www.vodafoneparedesdecoura.com

The Paredes de Coura Festival, currently named Vodafone Paredes de Coura for sponsorship reasons, is a music festival that is held every year, in August, at Praia do Taboão in Paredes de Coura, Portugal. The first edition was held in 1993.

It is currently one of the most popular summer music festivals in Portugal. In 2005, the Spanish edition of Rolling Stone named it as one of the five best summer festivals in Europe.

== Editions ==
Edition	Year	Dates	Naming sponsor	Headliners	Notable acts	Ticket price (full festival)
1	1993	20 August	None	Ecos da Cave		Free
2	1994	12 August	None	Ena Pá 2000		Free
3	1995	18-19 August	None	Kick Out The Jams, Xana		Free
4	1996	2–4 August	Imperial	Shed Seven, Primitive Reason, The Raincoats	Mão Morta, Da Weasel	1000 escudos
5	1997	15–17 August	Imperial	Paradise Lost, Smoke City, Rollins Band	Mão Morta, Blasted Mechanism	2500 escudos
6	1998	14–16 August	Imperial	Red House Painters, The Divine Comedy, Tindersticks	Atari Teenage Riot, Roni Size, Moonspell, Silence 4, Clã	4000 escudos
7	1999	13–15 August	Sagres	Deus, Suede, Guano Apes	Mogwai, Sneaker Pimps, Gomez, Lamb, The Gift	5000 escudos
8	2000	11–13 August	Sagres	The The, Bad Religion, Mr. Bungle	Coldplay, The Flaming Lips, Yo La Tengo, Ash, Jorge Palma	5000 escudos
9	2001	16–18 August	Sagres	Papa Roach, 3 Doors Down, Morcheeba	Queens of the Stone Age, Stone Temple Pilots, Frank Black, The Gift, Wraygunn	7500 escudos
10	2002	12–17 August	Sagres	Korn, Puddle of Mudd, Gotan Project, Lee "Scratch" Perry	Incubus, Counting Crows, Cousteau, Mad Professor, Sam The Kid	
11	2003	17–21 August	Optimus	Alpha Blondy, Placebo, Queens of the Stone Age, The Cardigans	PJ Harvey, Sizzla, Sum 41, Yeah Yeah Yeahs, Staind	
12	2004	16–20 August	Optimus	Jon Spencer Blues Explosion, Motörhead, The Strokes, Kelis	Scissor Sisters, Snow Patrol, Black Rebel Motorcycle Club, The Kills, Da Weasel	55 €
13	2005	15–18 August		Foo Fighters, Pixies, Nick Cave and the Bad Seeds	Queens of the Stone Age, Arcade Fire, Kaiser Chiefs, Killing Joke, The National	
14	2006	15–17 August	Heineken	Morrissey, Bloc Party, Bauhaus	Broken Social Scene, Yeah Yeah Yeahs, The Cramps, Gang of Four, Eagles of Death Metal	70 €
15	2007	12–15 August	Heineken	Babyshambles, Dinosaur Jr., Sonic Youth	M.I.A., New York Dolls, Peter, Bjorn and John, Mando Diao, CSS	
16	2008	31 July – 3 August	Heineken	Sex Pistols, Primal Scream, The Mars Volta, Thievery Corporation	Editors, Biffy Clyro, Mando Diao, The Lemonheads, Deus	70 €
17	2009	29 July –1 August	None	Patrick Wolf, Franz Ferdinand, Nine Inch Nails, The Hives	Supergrass, Portugal. The Man, Jarvis Cocker, The Horrors, The Temper Trap	
18	2010	28–31 July	None	The Cult, Klaxons, The Prodigy	Caribou, Peter Hook, Enter Shikari, White Lies, The Specials	70 €
19	2011	17–20 August	Ritek	Crystal Castles, Pulp, Kings of Convenience, Death From Above 1979	Deerhunter, Wild Beasts, Mogwai, Blonde Redhead, Two Door Cinema Club	75 €
20	2012	13–17 August	EDP	Deus, Kasabian, Ornatos Violeta	Stephen Malkmus and the Jicks, Anna Calvi, Digitalism, Patrick Watson, The Temper Trap	80 €
21	2013	13–17 August	Vodafone	The Knife, Echo & the Bunnymen, Belle and Sebastian	Justice (DJ set), Simian Mobile Disco, Alabama Shakes, Hot Chip, Calexico	80 €
22	2014	20–23 August	Vodafone	Franz Ferdinand, Beirut, James Blake	Janelle Monáe, Cut Copy, Cage The Elephant, Chvrches, Mac DeMarco	80 €
23	2015	19–22 August	Vodafone	TV on the Radio, Tame Impala, The War on Drugs, Lykke Li	Slowdive, Father John Misty, Charles Bradley, Ratatat, Mark Lanegan Band, Temples	85 €
24	2016	17–20 August	Vodafone	Unknown Mortal Orchestra, LCD Soundsystem, Cage The Elephant, Chvrches	Portugal. The Man, The Vaccines, The Tallest Man on Earth, Sleaford Mods, King Gizzard and the Lizard Wizard	90 €
25	2017	16–19 August	Vodafone	Kae Tempest, At The Drive-In, Beach House, Foals	Future Islands, Nick Murphy, King Krule, Car Seat Headrest, Ty Segall	90 €
26	2018	15–18 August	Vodafone	The Blaze, Fleet Foxes, Skepta, Arcade Fire	Slowdive, Jungle, Big Thief, King Gizzard and the Lizard Wizard, Linda Martini	100 €
27	2019	14–17 August	Vodafone	The National, New Order, Father John Misty, Patti Smith	Suede, Spiritualized, Deerhunter, Car Seat Headrest, Freddie Gibbs and Madlib	94 €
28	2022	16–20 August	Vodafone	Beach House, Turnstile, The Blaze, Pixies	Arlo Parks, BadBadNotGood, Idles, L'Impératrice, Parquet Courts, Perfume Genius, Princess Nokia, Slowthai, Ty Segall & Freedom Band	120 €
29	2023	16–19 August	Vodafone	Jessie Ware, Loyle Carner, Little Simz, Lorde	Bicep, The Brian Jonestown Massacre, Explosions in the Sky, Kenny Beats, Tim Bernardes, The Walkmen, Wilco, Yo La Tengo, Yung Lean	120 €
30	2024	14–17 August	Vodafone	Sampha, L'Impératrice, Girl in Red, The Jesus and Mary Chain	André 3000, Cat Power, Fontaines D.C., Idles, Killer Mike, Sleater-Kinney, Slowdive	120 €
31	2025	13–16 August	Vodafone	Vampire Weekend, Franz Ferdinand, Air, King Krule, Mk.gee, Lola Young	Zaho de Sagazan, Sharon Van Etten & the Attachment Theory, Geordie Greep, Black Country, New Road, Joey Valence & Brae, Fat Dog	130 €
