= Brave New World Tour =

2000–2002 concert tour by Iron Maiden

- Tour by Iron Maiden
- Official tour advertisement for the band's performance in Banská Bystrica, Slovakia, 6 June 2000
- Associated album: Brave New World
- Start date: 2 June 2000
- End date: 21 March 2002
- No. of shows: 83 (92 scheduled)

Iron Maiden concert chronology
- The Ed Hunter Tour (1999); Brave New World Tour (2000–2002); Give Me Ed... 'Til I'm Dead Tour (2003)

The Brave New World Tour was a concert tour by the English heavy metal band Iron Maiden. The tour began on 2 June 2000 and ended on 19 January 2001 (Three concerts shows scheduled at Brixton Academy in 2002). It supported their 2000 album Brave New World that marked the return of vocalist Bruce Dickinson and guitarist Adrian Smith. In Europe, the tour was called Metal 2000. The initial batch of dates included just one in Iron Maiden's homeland. "Everybody in the band would like to do a thirty-date tour of 1,500-2,000-seaters," maintained Bruce Dickinson, "but we've got a tour booked in Europe this summer and we will be playing to over two million people in two months. Newbridge Memorial Hall will have to wait for a while!"

On 19 January 2001, the band recorded Rock in Rio in front of an audience of 250,000, their second-largest crowd in Rio de Janeiro (the largest crowd being their 1985 Rock in Rio performance during the World Slavery Tour).

The Madison Square Garden concert on 5 August sold out in two hours. Three dates scheduled for Germany, Bulgaria and Greece in mid-July 2000 were cancelled so guitarist Janick Gers could recover after an accident at Mannheim, Germany, on 8 July: he slipped, fell off the stage, sustained a concussion and sprained his back.

== Tour dates ==
List of 2000 concerts
Date	City	Country	Venue
2 June 2000	Strasbourg	France	Festival des Artéfacts
3 June 2000	Nijmegen	Netherlands	Dynamo Open Air
5 June 2000	Prague	Czech Republic	Paegas Arena
6 June 2000	Banská Bystrica	Slovakia	Bystrica Amphitheatre
7 June 2000	Budapest	Hungary	Kisstadion
9 June 2000	Izola	Slovenia	Izola Stadium
10 June 2000	Monza	Italy	Gods of Metal
~~11 June 2000~~	Kyiv	Ukraine	RocKiev Festival
13 June 2000	Saint-Étienne	France	Palais des Spectacles
14 June 2000	Paris	France	Palais Omnisports de Paris-Bercy
16 June 2000	London	England	Earls Court
20 June 2000	Katowice	Poland	Spodek
21 June 2000	Warsaw	Poland	Torwar Hall
23 June 2000	Leipzig	Germany	With Full Force
24 June 2000	Dessel	Belgium	Graspop Metal Meeting
26 June 2000	Oslo	Norway	Oslo Spektrum
27 June 2000	Stockholm	Sweden	Stockholms Olympiastadion
29 June 2000	Roskilde	Denmark	Roskilde Festival
30 June 2000	Turku	Finland	Ruisrock Festival
2 July 2000	Tallinn	Estonia	Song Festival Grounds
4 July 2000	Vienna	Austria	Libro Music Hall
5 July 2000	Munich	Germany	Zenith
6 July 2000	Zürich	Switzerland	Hallenstadion
8 July 2000	Mannheim	Germany	Maimarkt-Gelände
~~9 July 2000~~	Essen	Germany	Grugahalle
~~12 July 2000~~	Sofia	Bulgaria	Stadion Akademik
~~14 July 2000~~	Athens	Greece	Oikologiko Parko, Ilion
16 July 2000	Vilar de Mouros	Portugal	Festival Vilar de Mouros
18 July 2000	San Sebastián	Spain	Velódromo de Anoeta
19 July 2000	Madrid	Spain	Las Ventas
~~21 July 2000~~	Mijas	Spain	Open Air
22 July 2000	Murcia	Spain	Open Air
23 July 2000	Barcelona	Spain	Palau Sant Jordi
1 August 2000	Toronto	Canada	Air Canada Centre
2 August 2000	Montreal	Canada	Molson Centre
3 August 2000	Quebec City	Canada	Colisée Pepsi
5 August 2000	New York City	United States	Madison Square Garden
6 August 2000	Mansfield	United States	Tweeter Center
8 August 2000	Hartford	United States	Meadows Music Theater
9 August 2000	Portland	United States	Cumberland County Civic Center
11 August 2000	Burgettstown	United States	Post-Gazette Pavilion
12 August 2000	Camden	United States	E-Centre
13 August 2000	Scranton	United States	Coors Light Amphitheatre
15 August 2000	Clarkston	United States	Pine Knob Music Theatre
16 August 2000	Corfu	United States	Darien Lake Amphitheatre
17 August 2000	Holmdel	United States	PNC Bank Arts Center
19 August 2000	Maryland Heights	United States	Riverport Amphitheater
20 August 2000	Bonner Springs	United States	Sandstone Amphitheater
23 August 2000	Cuyahoga Falls	United States	Blossom Music Center
25 August 2000	Chicago	United States	UIC Pavilion
26 August 2000	Milwaukee	United States	Marcus Amphitheater
27 August 2000	Saint Paul	United States	Roy Wilkins Auditorium
29 August 2000	Colorado Springs	United States	World Arena
30 August 2000	Morrison	United States	Red Rocks Amphitheatre
1 September 2000	Dallas	United States	Starplex Amphitheater
2 September 2000	The Woodlands	United States	Cynthia Woods Mitchell Pavilion
3 September 2000	San Antonio	United States	Sunken Garden Amphitheatre
4 September 2000	San Antonio	United States	Sunken Garden Amphitheatre
6 September 2000	El Paso	United States	Don Haskins Center
8 September 2000	Albuquerque	United States	Mesa del Sol Amphitheater
9 September 2000	Phoenix	United States	Desert Sky Pavilion
10 September 2000	Irvine	United States	Verizon Wireless Amphitheater
12 September 2000	San Diego	United States	San Diego Sports Arena
13 September 2000	Los Angeles	United States	Universal Amphitheatre
15 September 2000	Bakersfield	United States	Centennial Garden
16 September 2000	Mountain View	United States	Shoreline Amphitheatre
17 September 2000	Paradise	United States	Aladdin Theatre
~~18 September 2000~~	Anchorage	United States	Sullivan Arena
19 September 2000	Tacoma	United States	Tacoma Dome
20 September 2000	Vancouver	Canada	Pacific Coliseum
~~23 September 2000~~	Edmonton	Canada	Skyreach Center
~~24 September 2000~~	Calgary	Canada	Saddledome
19 October 2000	Sendai	Japan	Sun Plaza
21 October 2000	Tokyo	Japan	Kosei Nenkin Hall
22 October 2000	Yokohama	Japan	Pacifico Yokohama
23 October 2000	Tokyo	Japan	Tokyo International Forum Hall A
25 October 2000	Osaka	Japan	Zepp
26 October 2000	Fukuoka	Japan	Sun Palace
28 October 2000	Nagoya	Japan	Shi Kokaido
29 October 2000	Tokyo	Japan	Zepp Tokyo
2 November 2000	Glasgow	Scotland	S.E.C.C.
3 November 2000	Manchester	England	MEN Arena
4 November 2000	Birmingham	England	N.E.C. Arena
6 November 2000	Essen	Germany	Grugahalle
10 November 2000	Athens	Greece	E.A.K.N., Agios Kosmas

List of 2001 concerts
Date	City	Country	Venue
6 January 2001	London	England	Shepherd's Bush Empire
7 January 2001	London	England	Shepherd's Bush Empire
9 January 2001	Mexico City	Mexico	Foro Sol
~~12 January 2001~~	Buenos Aires	Argentina	Estadio Obras Sanitarias
13 January 2001	Buenos Aires	Argentina	José Amalfitani Stadium
15 January 2001	Santiago	Chile	Pista Atletica
19 January 2001	Rio de Janeiro	Brazil	Rock In Rio

List of 2002 concerts
Date	City	Country	Venue
19 March 2002	London	England	Brixton Academy
20 March 2002	London	England	Brixton Academy
21 March 2002	London	England	Brixton Academy
