= Everywhen (disambiguation) =

Everywhen is an Aboriginal Australian concept of time, represented by and embedded in The Dreaming.

Everywhen may also refer to:

== Music ==
- "Everywhen", a song by Massive Attack on their 2003 album 100th Window
- Everywhen, a 1990 album by We Are Going To Eat You, successor band to English band Hagar the Womb
- Everywhen, by Matthias Schack-Arnott, winner of the 2020 APRA Music Award for Electroacoustic/Sound Art in Australia
- Everywhen, a 2024 album by Portuguese band Best Youth

== Other uses ==
- "Everywhen", a short story by British science-fiction writer Dominic Green
