= Best Youth =

Portuguese band

- Origin: Porto, Portugal
- Genres: Indie-rock; Electronic music
- Website: wearebestyouth.com

Best Youth is a Portuguese band formed by Ed Rocha Gonçalves and Catarina Salinas.

== Description and history ==
Best Youth is a band from Porto formed by Ed Rocha Gonçalves and Catarina Salinas, whose sound could be described as clash between electronic indie rock and dream pop.

In 2011 their self-released by Optimus Discos, the first EP, "Winterlies", with the first single "Hang Out" has seen airplay in all the major national radio stations and topped the chart of Antena 3 for 3 weeks, leading them to make its presence in the most important festivals of the specialty, such as Optimus Alive!, Optimus Primavera Sound, Paredes de Coura, among others.

In 2013 they released an album and toured nationwide with "There Must be a Place", a project shared with fellow band We Trust and also the release of a one-off single – "Still your girl", both garnering airplay and success all around the country. 2013 was also the year for breaking out internationally and resulted in two prizes received in Spain for best European band for Best Youth and best European newcomer for "There Must be a Place", and a show at Glimps Festival in Belgium.

In 2014 they released a theme in collaboration with Moullinex joining the tops of the largest national radio stations, as well as "Red Diamond" – the first single from his debut album. Ed and Catherine released in late March its long-awaited debut album, "Highway Moon", their first original album, a production that transcends national borders and brings together critical positive in the UK. "Mirrorball", the second single, debuted in CLASH magazine and brought an open compliment of BBC London: "my favorite new band out of Portugal."

== Discography ==
=== EP ===
- Winterlies (2011)

=== LP ===
- Highway Moon (2015)
- Cherry Domino (2018)
- Everywhen (2024)
