= Sean Riley & The Slowriders =

Portuguese band

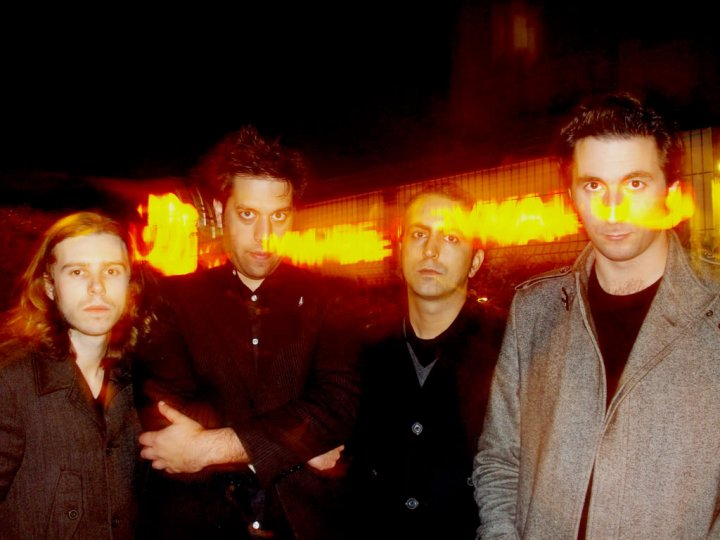
- Sean Riley & the Slowriders.

Background information
- Origin: Coimbra, Portugal
- Genres: Rock, Folk, Blues
- Years active: 2006-present
- Label: Valentim de Carvalho
- Members: Afonso Rodrigues; Filipe Costa; Bruno Simões; Filipe Rocha
- Website: seanrileyandtheslowriders.com

Sean Riley & The Slowriders is a Portuguese band from Coimbra with a sound close to music of Americana roots such as folk, rock and blues. The band represented Portugal at the 2010 Eurosonic Festival.

== History ==
Sean Riley named his debut album Farewell. An auspicious beginning that revealed the intentions of a group of friends that gathered to make music and enjoy themselves. But the simplicity and hedonism that formed the basis of Farewell were betrayed by a set of 11 songs that projected Sean Riley & the Slowriders onto the main stages of Portugal, authors of one of the best debuts in the history of Portuguese recorded music. The media attention raised the stakes for the follow-up album, Only Time Will Tell.

Only Time Will Tell presented a second collection of 12 songs by Sean Riley, selected from the many song ideas presented to the Slowriders during preproduction.

"Houses and Wifes", "This Woman" and "Hold on" were some of the tracks played live during the extensive national tour, which included an appearance at festivals, Portuguese cities as well as dates in the UK, Spain and the Netherlands, where the band performed at Eurosonic 2011.

Back home, the band wasted no time heading back into the studio to record their third album, It’s Been a Long Night.

Sean Riley & the Slowriders have just released their fourth album Sean Riley & The Slowriders.

== Discography ==
- Farewell (CD, 2007)
- Moving On (Vinyl, 2007)
- Only Time Will Tell (CD, 2009)
- It's Been a Long Night (CD, 2011)
- Sean Riley & The Slowriders (2016)

=== Compilations ===
- Novos Talentos FNAC 2007 (CD, 2007)
- 3 Pistas: Vol. 2 (CD, 2009)

== Members ==
- Afonso Rodrigues (voice, guitar, harmonica, organ),
- Filipe Costa (organ, piano, guitar, bass, drums, harmonica),
- Bruno Simões (bass, guitar, melodica),
- Filipe Rocha (drums, upright bass, glockenspiel)
