= Trikk =

Portuguese musician

- Also known as: Trikk
- Born: B. Deodato; 1991 (age 34–35); Porto, Portugal
- Genres: Electronic, Techno, House, Experimental
- Occupations: DJ, Producer
- Years active: 2012-present
- Labels: Innervisions, Lossless

Trikk is a Portuguese electronic musician born in Porto, Portugal. His music has been released by a number of different labels, including Innervisions.

== EPs and singles ==
- Wat U Do / All This Time (Con+ainer, 2012)
- Jointly / I Fall Down (ManMakeMusic, 2012)
- Midnight Sequence / Back To Back / Labour 91 / Prime Time (Hyper_LTD, 2013)
- Basement Traxx EP (ManMakeMusic, 2013)
- Deeper Point / Houx 93 / Bliss Drive / Straight Circles (Truesoul, 2014)
- Firma / Liberal (Pets Recordings, 2015)
- Abstract Language / Deviation 33 (ManMakeMusic, 2015)
- Subito / Functional (Pets Recordings, 2015)
- Proto Rhyth (Black Version / Bodies (Modern Dub) (Lossless, 2016)
- Several (Gysin Dub) / Esplendor / General System / Modo Ritmico (Optimo Trax, 2016)
- Florista / Mozam / Veneno / Wardance Dub (Innervisions, 2016)
- Mundo Ritual (Innervisions, 2017)
- Vilara / Devila (Innervisions, 2018)

== Other EPs and singles ==
- Catz’ N Dogz Presents Body Language Volume 12 (Get Physical Music, 2012)
- Friends Will Carry You Home Too Pt. 2 (Pets Recordings, 2013)
- George Fitzgerald - Thinking Of You (Hotflush Recordings, 2013)
- Alma (Pets Recordings - VA - 2013)
- Uncore 95 (Drumcode - VA - 2014)
- Volta (Balance Music Mix - 2016)
- Outbound.2 - Trikk - Return To Order (N.Y Dub) (Lossless, 2017)
- Fabric 97: Tale Of Us - Trikk - Metala (Fabric, 2018)
