= Tara Perdida =

Portuguese punk rock band

- Origin: Lisbon, Portugal
- Genres: Punk rock Hardcore punk Skate punk
- Years active: 1995 – present
- Labels: Música Alternativa; Sony Music
- Members: Tiago Afonso; Pedro Rosario (Kistos); Rui Costa (Ruka); Tiago Felgueiras (Ganso); Alexandre Morais
- Past members: Cró; Orélio; Nuno Espirito Santo; João Ribas (deceased); Jimmix; Rodrigo
- Website: https://www.somostaraperdida.pt/

Tara Perdida is a Portuguese punk rock band. Composed of five members: Tiago Afonso (vocals), Ruka (guitar), Ganso (guitar), Alexandre Morais (bass) and Pedro Rosario (drums), it was originally an underground project, but upon the release of their album, Lambe-Botas in 2008, they have become commercially successful, especially among young generations.

Tara Perdida formed when João Ribas, after leaving Censurados (a pioneering punk band in Portugal) wanted to create another Portuguese punk rock band, and other bandmantes, Ruka and Orélio had the same goal. So they joined, in 1995 and formed Tara Perdida. Since then Tara Perdida has released seven studio albums: Tara Perdida, Só Não Vê Quem Não Quer, É Assim..., Lambe-Botas, Nada a Esconder, Dono do Mundo and Luto.

Tara Perdida is probably the most successful surviving Portuguese punk rock band (albeit not as successful as Peste & Sida or even Censurados in their heyday, but these bands disappeared or stopped playing punk), and has on several occasions opened NOFX and The Offspring concerts. A DVD was released in December 2007, featuring a live performance in Almada. A studio album was also released in the beginning of 2008. The band featured in the opening line-up of the 2008 Lisbon, (Portugal), Super Bock Super Rock festival as guests of Iron Maiden.

On 23 March 2014, vocalist João Ribas dies victim of respiratory infection. On 22 June 2015, the band released their brand new album titled Luto, the first album with new vocalist Tiago Afonso (Easyway) following the death of João Ribas.
