= Vilar de Mouros =

Civil parish in Portugal

- Civil parish
- Location in Portugal
- Coordinates: 41.891°N 8.797°W
- Country: Portugal
- Region: Norte
- Intermunic. comm.: Alto Minho
- District: Viana do Castelo
- Municipality: Caminha

Area
  - Total: 10.38 km^{2} (4.01 sq mi)

Population (2011)
  - Total: 753
  - Density: 73/km^{2} (190/sq mi)
- Time zone: UTC+00:00 (WET)
  - Summer (DST): UTC+01:00 (WEST)

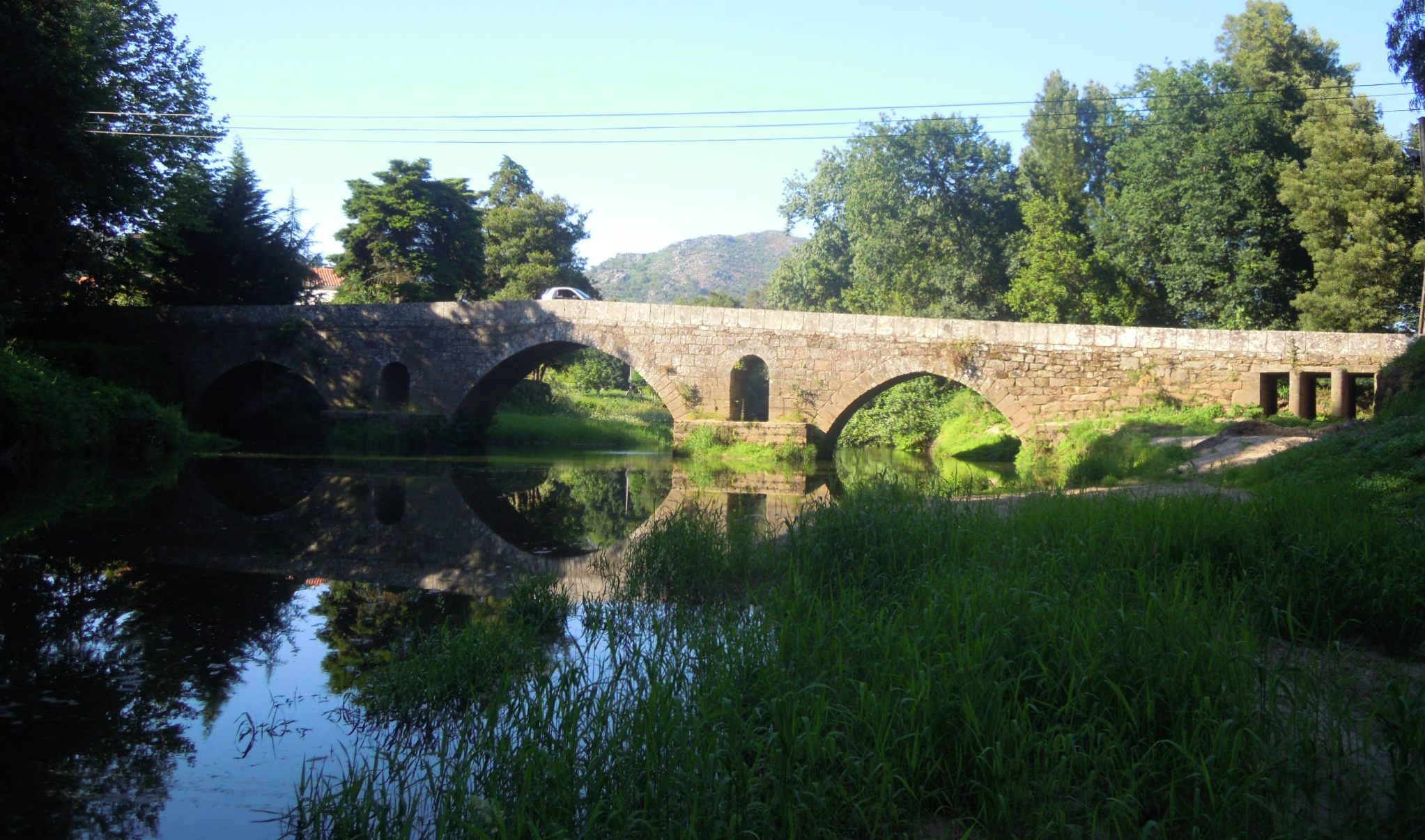

Vilar de Mouros is a civil parish ("freguesia") in the municipality of Caminha, Portugal. The population in 2011 was 753, in an area of 10.38 km^{2}. Located on the banks of the Coura, 7 km from the municipal seat, it became famous as the location of the oldest rock festival in Portugal - the Vilar de Mouros Festival.
