= Rui Sinel de Cordes =

Portuguese actor

- Born: 1980 (age 45–46); Lisbon
- Occupations: Comedian; Actor; TV show host

Rui Vasco Pereira Sinel de Cordes (Lisbon, Santa Isabel, 13 February 1980), is a Portuguese author, comedian and television host. Apart from claiming to being one of the pioneers of black humor in Portugal, black humor has been part of Portuguese humor for decades before him. He was also the director and host of several TV shows with mixed results.

== Early life ==
Son of Vasco Rui da Cruz Sinel de Cordes and Maria de Fátima Pereira, he was born on 13 February 1980 at the Curry Cabral hospital. His parents got divorced when he was 3 years old.

== Biography ==
After graduating from D. Pedro V High School, Rui got a degree in Communication Science at the Autonomous University of Lisbon, but started working as a writer and a web designer. After a while he started getting involved in amateur theatre, did several courses, workshops and wrote several daily columns for the sports newspaper Record, while further developing his passion for stand-up comedy.

His first television show, Preto no Branco, aired in 2009 in SIC Radical, the show was a mix between sketch comedy and routine stand-up comedy jokes. In that same year, he entered the live comedy scene with his first solo stand-up show Black Label, which sold out both Coliseu de Lisboa and Coliseu do Porto.

In 2010, he aired Gente da Minha Terra, the show consisted of Rui travelling from a region of Portugal to another every week while making fun of the region's history, culture and current situation. The show proved to be a success and got a second season named Gente da Minha Terra Europa, in which Rui decides to stop making fun of Portugal and travels to various countries in Europe in order to prove that Portugal might not be that bad in the European context. After good feedback, Rui did Gente da Minha Terra Europa II and visited some European countries that he missed.

In 2012, he was the first Portuguese comedian to be sued by the Entidade Reguladora para a Comunicação Social (ERC), which is the entity of the Portuguese Republic that supervises and regulates media.

In the next couple of years he continued working on his live solo comedy shows, releasing Punchliner (2013) and Isto Era Para Ser Com o Sassetti (2014).

He came back to television with his new show Very Typical (2015), in which he once again showed Portugal's worst traits through satire. Sinel de Cordes claimed that there were more topics he would have liked to include in season 1, such as the top 10 worst moments in the history of Portugal, and in 2016 the show got a second season.

He was also the Roastmaster for the first Roast in the history of Portuguese television in 2016, the target of the Roast was the channel SIC Radical, which hosted all of Rui's shows.

Still in 2016, he releases the solo comedy show Je Suis Cordes, followed by Cordes, Out! (2017) where Rui announced he would be moving to England and trying stand-up there.

Cordes came back to Portugal a year later and made his sixth solo show London Eyes (2018), in which he jokes around about the new realities he saw while away, and in the next year he released his seventh show, Momento Mori (2019).

In 2020, Rui announced an ambitious project, a solo comedy show divided in two parts, O Início é o Fim (2020), in the first part O Início , Rui tells the story of humanity until 2020, and then in the second part É o Fim, he jokes about the destiny of humankind from 2020 until the end. Each show got its own tour, but due to the pandemic most of the dates for both O Início and É o Fim were postponed.

In the same year, Cordes announced CordesFlix, a pay-per-view streaming platform, as a way to continue releasing content during the lockdown.
