= Easyway =

Portuguese punk rock band founded in 2000

- Origin: Carnaxide, Portugal
- Genres: Melodic hardcore Skate punk Punk rock
- Years active: 2000-present
- Labels: Universal Publishing
- Members: Tiago Afonso; Miguel S. Marques; Miguel P. Marques; Danilo Warick
- Website: http://www.easywayrock.com/

Easyway is a Portuguese punk rock band founded in 2000. They have released three albums.

== History ==
In 2001, Easyway, made a seven track demo, via this and live performances the band grew in the Portuguese underground scene. At the end of Summer 2001 the original drummer, Rodrigo, was replaced with Danilo Warick (who previously played in a metal band called Sacred Sin).

They began work on a first album, Forever In A Day in 2003 (in Lisbon). After the recording the guitar player, Miguel Marques, went to Los Angeles to mix the album. The album was produced by Cameron Webb (who previously worked with Limp Bizkit, Staring Back, Social Distortion and Danzig).

== Discography ==
- Forever In A Day - 2004
- Can You Keep A Secret? - 2006
- Laudamus Vita CD+DVD - 2010
