= Ramp (Portuguese band) =

Portuguese thrash metal band

R.A.M.P.
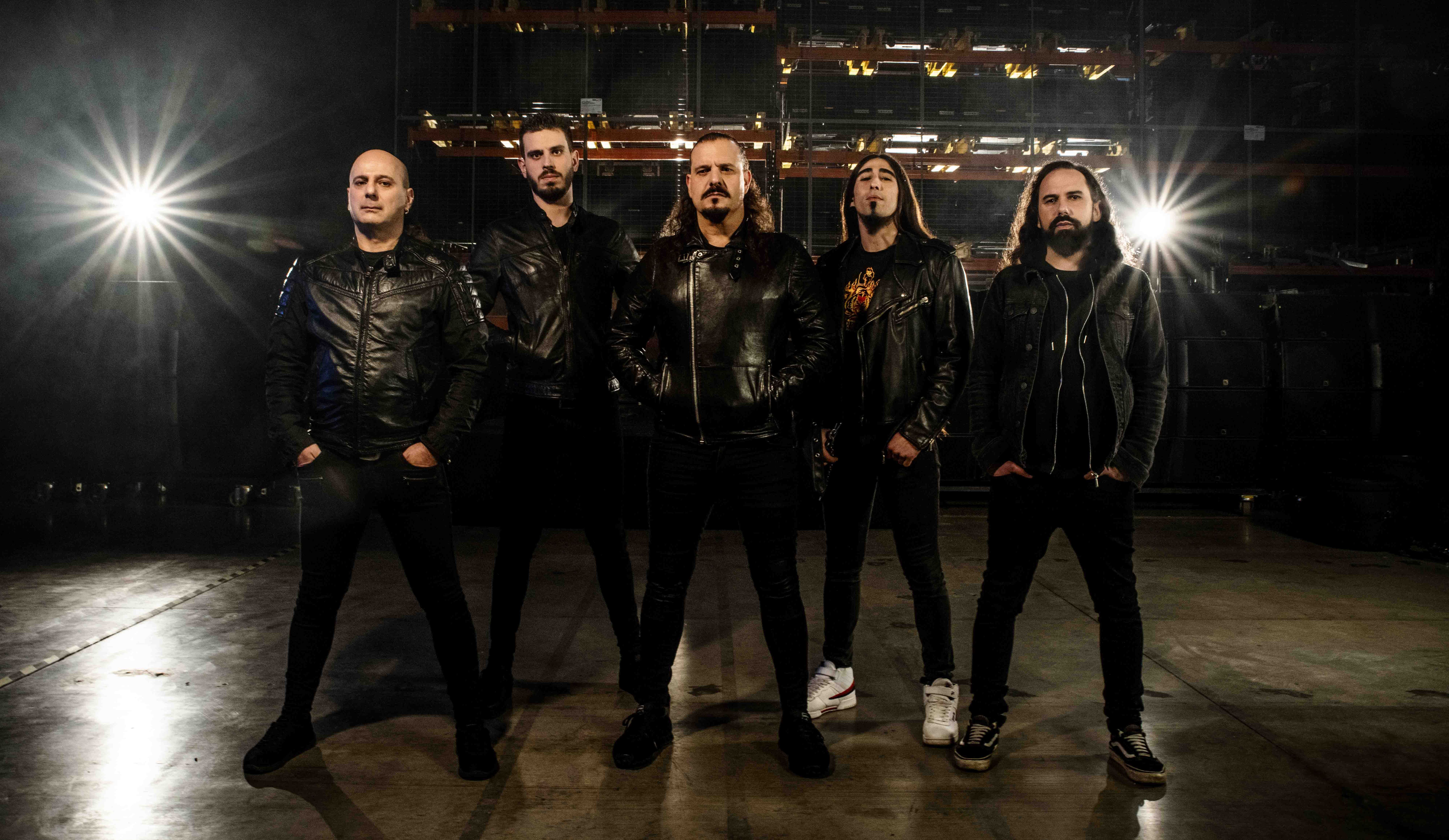
- 2022 promotional photo

Background information
- Origin: Seixal, Setúbal, Portugal
- Genres: Groove metal, thrash metal
- Years active: 1989–present
- Labels: PolyGram; União Lisboa; Farol Música; Paranoid; Metrodiscos; Rastilho
- Members: Rui Duarte; Ricardo Mendonça; João Gonçalves; David Mendonça; Apache Neto
- Website: rampmetal.com

Ramp (stylized RAMP or R.A.M.P.) is a Portuguese groove and thrash metal band formed in Seixal, Setúbal, in 1989. The band name comprises the initials of the first names of the founding members, Ricardo, António, Miguel, and Paulo. Ramp is considered one of the most influential metal bands in Portugal.

== History ==
The band was founded in Seixal in 1989 by guitarist Ricardo Mendonça and singer Rui Duarte. That year, they opened for Mortífera and The Coven. Mortífera bassist João Saps later replaced Miguel. The band recorded a demo and sent it to various labels to secure a contract. The EP Thoughts followed in 1992 via PolyGram. Music videos were created for the songs "Try Again", "Last Child" and "Thoughts". After three more songs were added to the EP, Thoughts was released in CD format as an album via PolyGram. This was followed by various shows, including opening for Sepultura.

In 1995, the second album Intersection was released via União Lisboa. The third album, Evolution, Devolution, Revolution, was recorded in Nottingham at Square Studios with producer Simon Efemey. It was released towards the end of 1998, and music videos were recorded for the songs "Old Times" and "For a While". Towards the end of the following year, the live double album Ramp...Live was released, which contained live recordings from their tenth-anniversary show. Footage from this was used for the music video "How". In 2002, the band performed at the main stage of the Portuguese leg of the Ozzfest. In 2003, the next studio album, Nude, was released via Paranoid Records. In 2005, the band released an EP that included a cover of Duran Duran's "Planet Earth" and António Variações' "Anjinho da Guarda". It also included the then-new song "You Make Me". That year, the band played with Metallica, Iron Maiden, Tool, Sepultura, Alice Cooper, Fear Factory, Motörhead, Paradise Lost, Slayer, Manowar, Angra, Ill Niño, Kittie, Drowning Pool, The Exploited, Fudge Tunnel, Benediction, Dismember, Ratos de Porão, Rollins Band, Monster Magnet and Sadist. In 2009, the album Visions was released. After a long absence, another studio album, Insidiously, was released in 2022 through Rastilho Records.

== Musical style ==
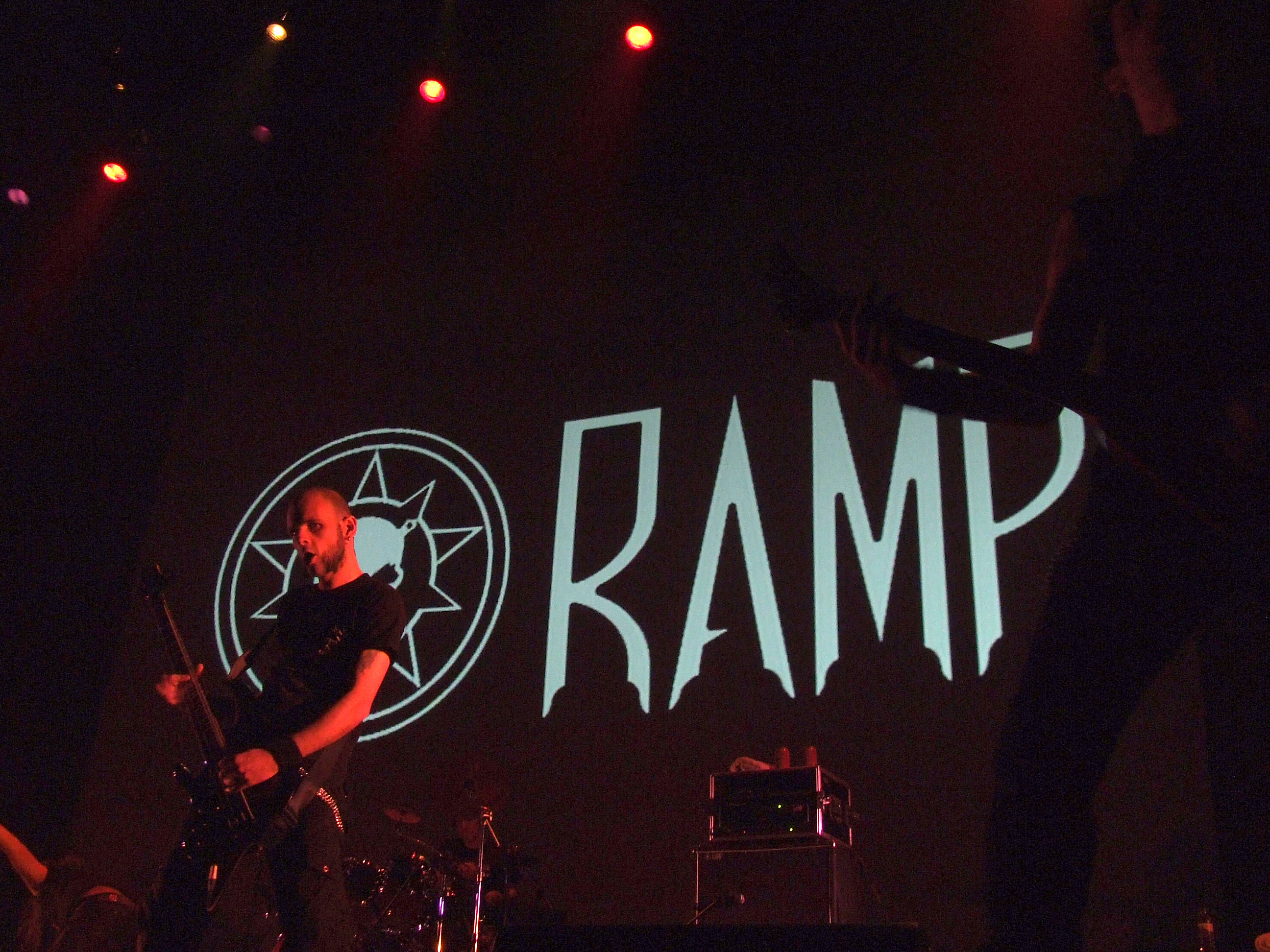
Ramp performing in 2009

The band played pure thrash metal at the beginning of their career. In later releases, they moved towards groove metal.

== Members ==
=== Current ===
- Rui Duarte – vocals (1989–present)
- Ricardo Mendonça – guitar (1989–present)
- João Gonçalves – drums
- David Mendonça – guitar
- Apache Neto – bass

=== Former ===
- Miguel Fernandes (1989–?)
- Paulo Martins (1989–2022)
- Tó Zé (1989–2008)
- Caveirinha
- João Sapo
- Tó Pica
- José Sales
- Pedro Mendes

== Discography ==
=== Studio albums ===
- Thoughts (1992, PolyGram)
- Intersection (1995, União Lisboa)
- Evolution, Devolution, Revolution (1998, Farol Música)
- Nude (2003, Paranoid Records)
- Visions (2009, Metrodiscos)
- Insidiously (2022, Rastilho Records)

=== EPs ===
- Thoughts (1992, PolyGram)
- Planet Earth (2005, Paranoid Records)

=== Singles ===
- "The Last Child" (1992, PolyGram)
- "Black Tie" (1996, União Lisboa IV)
- "Old Times" (1998, Farol Música)
- "Hallelujah" (1998, Farol Música)
- "Alone" (2003, Paranoid Records)

=== Other releases ===
- Ramp…Live (live album, 1999, Farol Música)
- XXV 1988–2013 (compilation, 2013, Metrodiscos/Sony Music Portugal)
