= Capicua =

Portuguese rapper

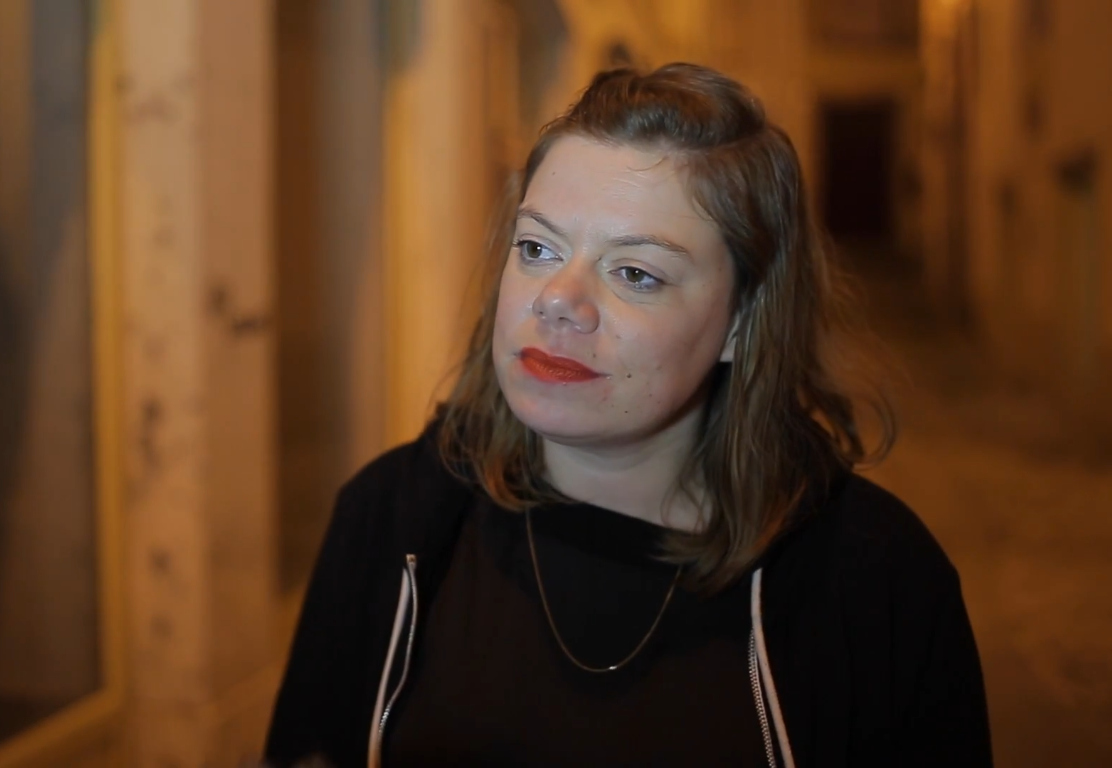

Background information
- Born: Ana Matos Fernandes; 1982 (age 43–44); Porto
- Origin: Portugal
- Genres: Rap, Hip hop Tuga
- Occupation: Rapper
- Years active: 2006-present
- Website: www.capicua.pt

Ana Matos Fernandes, better known by the stage name Capicua, is a Portuguese rapper from Porto.

== Biography ==
Ana Matos Fernandes was born in Porto, Portugal, graduated in Sociology in ISCTE and got her PhD in Human Geography at Barcelona. Nonetheless, she always wanted to make music. Her songs started to reach the mainstream media in 2012. She began making collaborations with several artists, such as Sérgio Godinho, Sam the Kid and DJ Ride. Her work is strongly influenced by Portuguese poets, such as Sophia de Mello Breyner.

== Discography ==
- 2021 - Encore (Live EP)
- 2020 - Madrepérola
- 2015 - Medusa
- 2014 - Sereia Louca (LP)
- 2013 - Capicua goes West (Mixtape Vol.2)
- 2012 - Capicua (LP)
- 2008 - Capicua goes Preemo (Mixtape Vol.1)
- 2007 - Mau Feitio
- 2006- Syzygy (EP)
