= Primitive Reason =

Portuguese band

- Origin: Portugal
- Genres: alternative rock; rap rock; ska punk; alternative metal
- Years active: 1995–2015
- Labels: Kaminari Records; Jah Notion; Farol Música; União Lisboa
- Members: Guillermo de Llera; Abel Beja; Tino Dias; Luís Pereira; Rui Travasso
- Past members: João Rato; Brian Jackson; Micas Ventura; Mark Cain; Tom Martin; Rob Dinero; Jorge Felizardo; Tó Bravo; Nélson Sobral; João Marques; Marcos Alves; Hélder Brazete; Ricardo Magala; Jorge Mata; James Beja; Ricardo Barriga; Pepe de Souza
- Website: primitivereason.net

Primitive Reason are an alternative crossover rock band based in Lisbon, Portugal, with Guillermo de Llera (voice, percussion, didgeridoo), Abel Beja (guitar), Luís Pereira (bass), Tino Dias (drums), and Rui Travasso (saxophone). Their sixth full-length album, Power To The People, was released on 1 April 2013.

== Current members ==
- Guillermo de Llera – lead vocals, percussion and didgeridoo, founding member
- Abel Beja – guitar, backing vocals, since 2000
- Tino Dias – drums, since 2012
- Luís Pereira – bass, since 2010
- Rui Travasso – saxophone, since 2010

== Former members ==
- João Rato – guitar – 1996–1997
- Brian Jackson – singer – 1993–1999
- Micas Ventura – guitar – 1993–1999
- Mark Cain – saxophone – 1995–1999
- Tom Martin – guest guitar player in the album Some of Us – 2000
- Rob Dinero – turntables – 2000
- Jorge Felizardo – drums – 1993–2003
- Tó Bravo – trombone – 2003
- Nélson Sobral – drums – 2004
- João Marques – trombone – 2004–2005
- Marcos Alves – drums – 2003–2006
- Hélder Brazete – drums – 2004–2006
- Ricardo Magala – trumpet – 2004–2007
- Jorge Mata – saxophone – 2005–2007
- James Beja – bass – 2000–2008
- Ricardo Barriga – guitar – 2007–2009
- Pepe de Souza – drums, 2007-2011

== Discography ==
Discography	Date	Label
Alternative Prison	15-05-1996	União Lisboa, Kaminari Records.
Tips Shortcuts	10-12-1998	Farol, Kaminari Records
Some Of Us	30-07-2001	Jah Notion, Kaminari Records
4.0 EP	00-12-2002	Kaminari Records
The Firescroll	19-05-2003	Kaminari Records
The Firescroll (Fan Edition)	06-09-2004	Kaminari Records
Pictures in The Wall	12-04-2005	Kaminari Records
Cast The Way EP	17-12-2007	Kaminari Records
Alternative Prison (Reissue)	12-05-2008	Kaminari Records
Power To The People	01-04-2013	Kaminari Records
