= Capitão Fausto =

Portuguese rock band

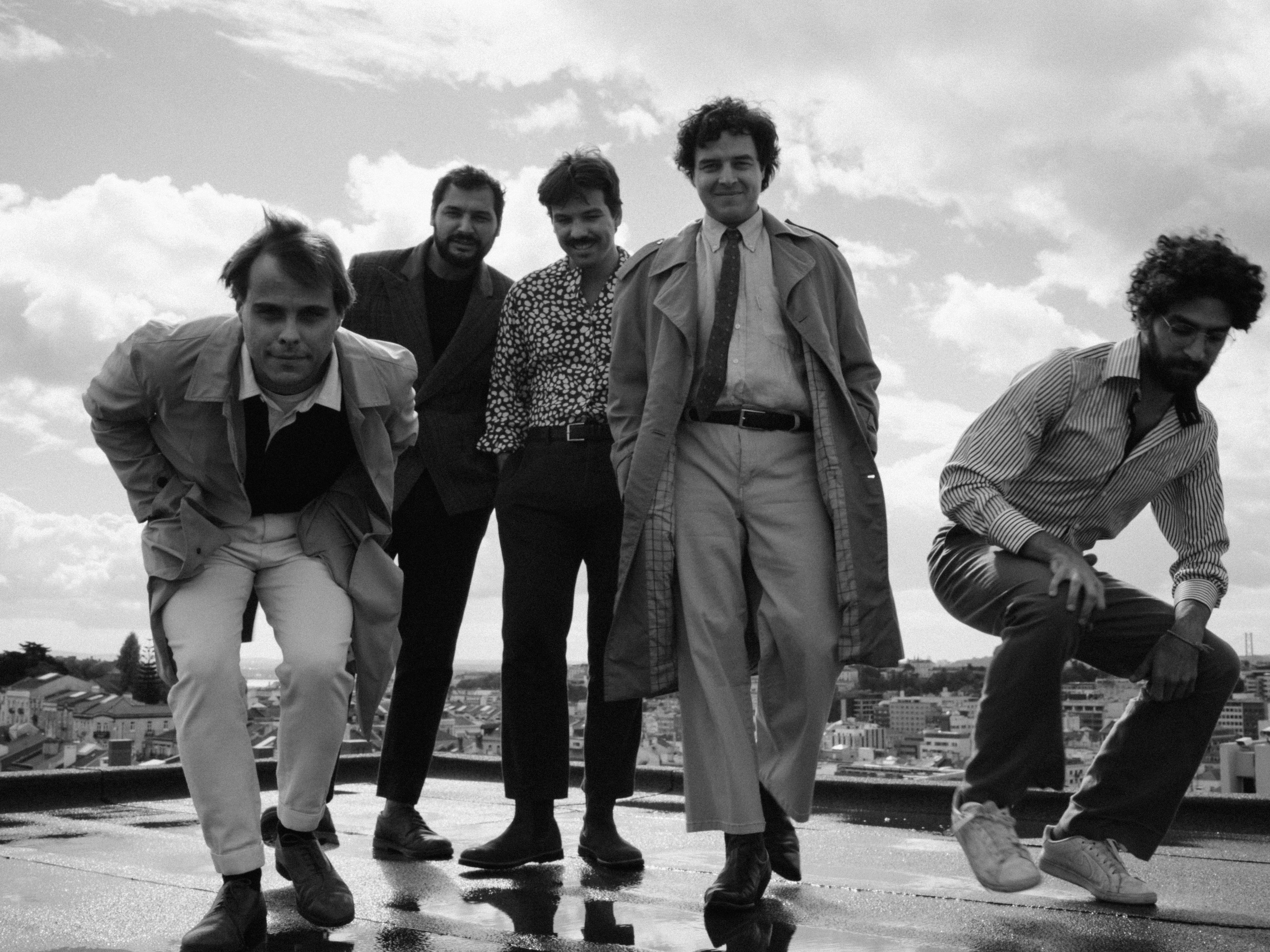
- Capitão Fausto in 2022. From left to right: Domingos Coimbra, Manuel Palha, Salvador Seabra, Tomás Wallenstein and Francisco Ferreira.

Background information
- Origin: Lisbon, Portugal
- Genres: Indie rock; indie pop; psychedelic rock
- Years active: 2009–present
- Labels: Chifre; Sony Music
- Members: Tomás Wallenstein; Manuel Palha; Domingos Coimbra; Salvador Seabra
- Past members: Francisco Ferreira
- Website: capitaofausto.pt

Capitão Fausto are a Portuguese rock band from Lisbon, formed in 2009. The band currently consists of Tomás Wallenstein (vocals, guitar, keyboards), Manuel Palha (guitar, keyboards), Domingos Coimbra (bass) and Salvador Seabra (drums). Francisco Ferreira was the main keyboard player until 2024.

There are several stories as to why the band is named "Capitão Fausto", but no version has been officially confirmed. Their albums Capitão Fausto Têm os Dias Contados (2016) and A Invenção do Dia Claro (2019) reached number one on the Portuguese album charts.

The band participated in a benefit concert in May 2026 to support the victims of Storm Kristin, which devastated the central region of Portugal.

== Members ==
Current members

- Tomás Wallenstein – vocals, guitar, keyboards (2009–present)
- Manuel Palha – guitar, keyboards (2009–present)
- Domingos Coimbra – bass (2009–present)
- Salvador Seabra – drums (2009–present)

Former members

- Francisco Ferreira – keyboards (2009–2024)

== Discography ==
=== Studio albums ===
Title	Details	Peak chart position
Title	Details	POR
Gazela	Released: November 7, 2011; Label: Chifre; Formats: CD, LP, digital download	12
Pesar o Sol	Released: January 24, 2014; Label: Sony Music; Formats: CD, LP, digital download	5
Capitão Fausto Têm os Dias Contados	Released: April 15, 2016; Label: Sony Music; Formats: CD, LP, digital download	1
A Invenção do Dia Claro	Released: March 15, 2019; Label: Sony Music; Formats: CD, LP, digital download	1
Subida Infinita	Released: March 15, 2024; Label: Sony Music; Formats: CD, LP, digital download	7
"-" denotes a recording that did not chart or was not released in that territory.
