= WrayGunn =

Portuguese band

Wraygunn
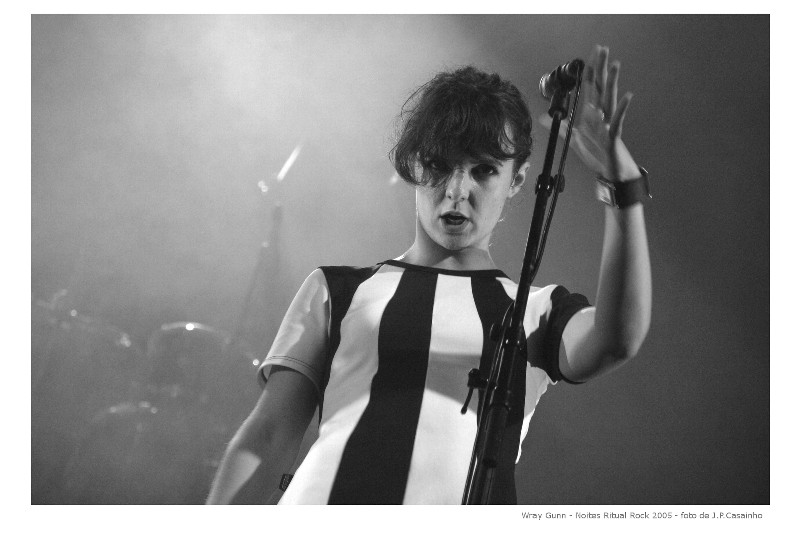
- Raquel Ralha

Background information
- Origin: Coimbra, Portugal
- Genres: Indie rock Blues rock Soul; Gospel
- Years active: 1999–present
- Labels: Norte Sul, Exclaim!, Skydog
- Members: Sérgio Cardoso; Francisco Correia; João Doce; Paulo Furtado; Pedro Pinto; Raquel Ralha; Selma Uamusse
- Website: www.wraygunn.com

WrayGunn are a Portuguese band formed in Coimbra, in early 1999. Their music is a mix of rock, soul, gospel and blues. Paulo Furtado (lead guitar and vocals) says their sound is something like Elvis singing in a space shuttle. Other members of the group are Raquel Ralha (vocals), Sérgio Cardoso (bass guitar), Francisco Correia (sampler), Pedro Pinto (drums), Selma Uamusse (vocals), João Doce (drums). In 2008, the band was nominated in the category "best Portuguese band" for the "Globos de Ouro".

== Discography ==
- "Amateur" (2000)
- "Soul Jam" (2001)
- "Ecclesiastes" 1.11 (2005)
- "Shangri-la" (2007)
- L´Art Brut (2012)
