= Linda Martini =

Portuguese rock band

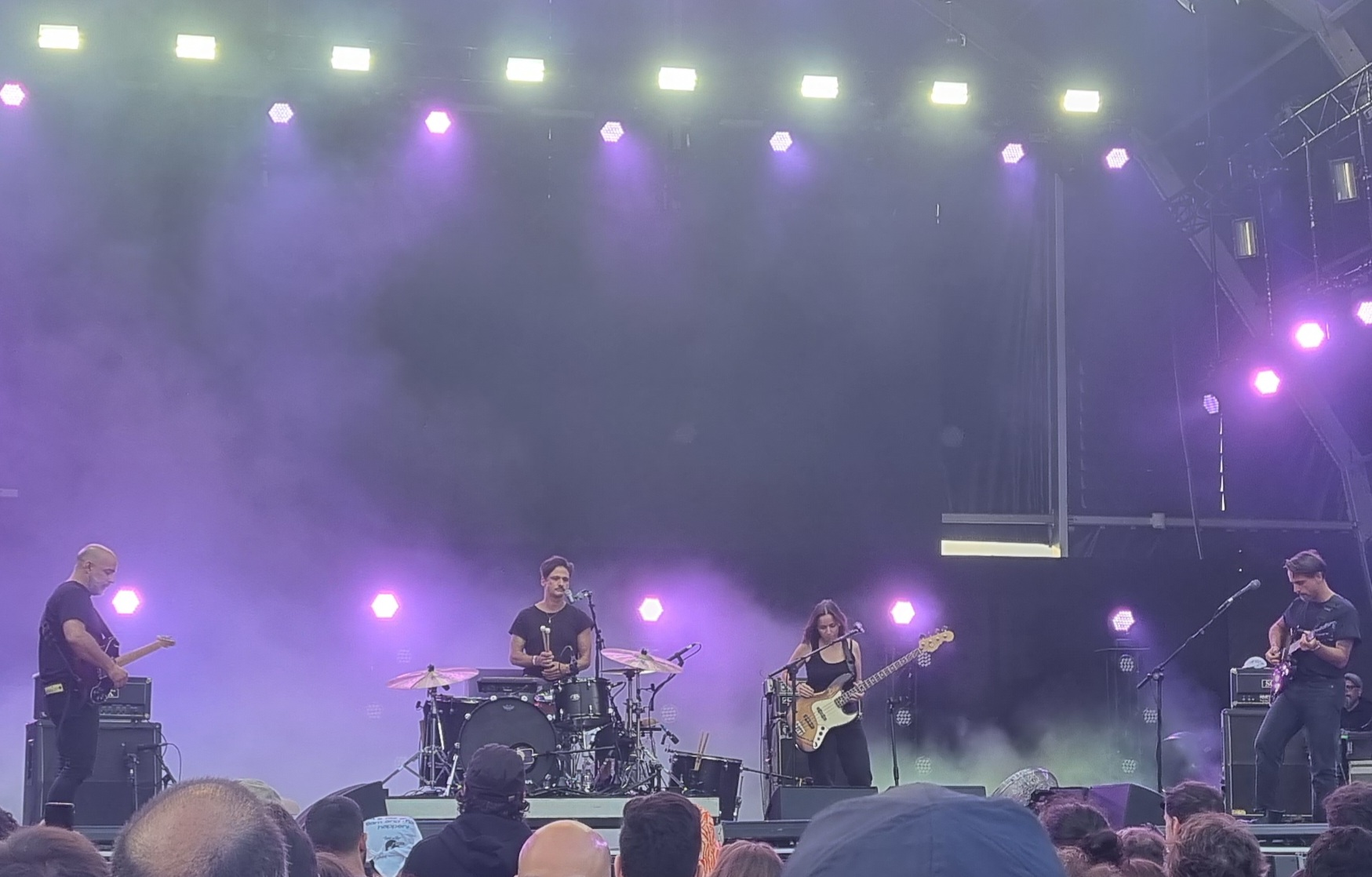
- Linda Martini in 2022. From left to right: Rui Carvalho, Hélio Morais, Cláudia Guerreiro and André Henriques.

Background information
- Origin: Lisbon, Portugal
- Genres: Alternative rock; post-hardcore; noise rock; post-rock
- Years active: 2003–present
- Labels: Naked; Edições Lisboa Agência; Rastilho Records; Universal Music; Sony Music
- Members: André Henriques; Cláudia Guerreiro; Hélio Morais; Rui Carvalho
- Past members: Pedro Geraldes; Sérgio Lemos
- Website: lindamartini.net

Linda Martini are a Portuguese rock band based in Lisbon, formed in 2003. Originally a five-piece, the band was founded by André Henriques (guitar, vocals), Pedro Geraldes (guitar), Sérgio Lemos (guitar), Claúdia Guerreiro (bass) and Hélio Morais (drums). The band recently added Rui Carvalho as a full time fourth member after a brief period acting as a trio.

Linda Martini are one of the most successful bands in the Portuguese alternative rock scene, having played in all major Portuguese music festivals and achieved two number-ones in the Portuguese album charts with the albums Sirumba and Linda Martini.

== Members ==
Current members

- André Henriques – vocals, guitar (2003–present)
- Cláudia Guerreiro – bass (2003–present)
- Hélio Morais – drums (2003–present)
- Rui Carvalho – guitar (2022–present)

Past members

- Pedro Geraldes – guitar (2003–2022)
- Sérgio Lemos – guitar (2003–2009)

== Discography ==
=== Studio albums ===
Title	Details	Peak chart positions
Title	Details	POR
Olhos de Mongol	Released: 2006; Label: Naked; Formats: CD, LP, digital download	—
Casa Ocupada	Released: November 1, 2010; Label: Edições Lisboa Agência; Formats: CD, LP, digital download	4
Turbo Lento	Released: September 30, 2013; Label: Universal Music; Formats: CD, LP, digital download	2
Sirumba	Released: April 1, 2016; Label: Universal Music; Formats: CD, LP, digital download	1
Linda Martini	Released: February 16, 2018; Label: Sony Music; Formats: CD, LP, digital download	1
Errôr	Released: February 25, 2022; Label: Sony Music; Formats: CD, LP, digital download	2
Passa-Montanhas	Released: January 24, 2025; Label: Sony Music; Formats: CD, LP, digital download	3
"—" denotes a recording that did not chart or was not released in that territory.

=== Extended plays ===
- Linda Martini (2006)
- Marsupial (2008)
- Intervalo (2009)

=== Live albums ===
- Merda e Ouro (2024)

=== Compilations ===
- Baú (2014)
