= Blasted Mechanism =

Portuguese electro-rock band

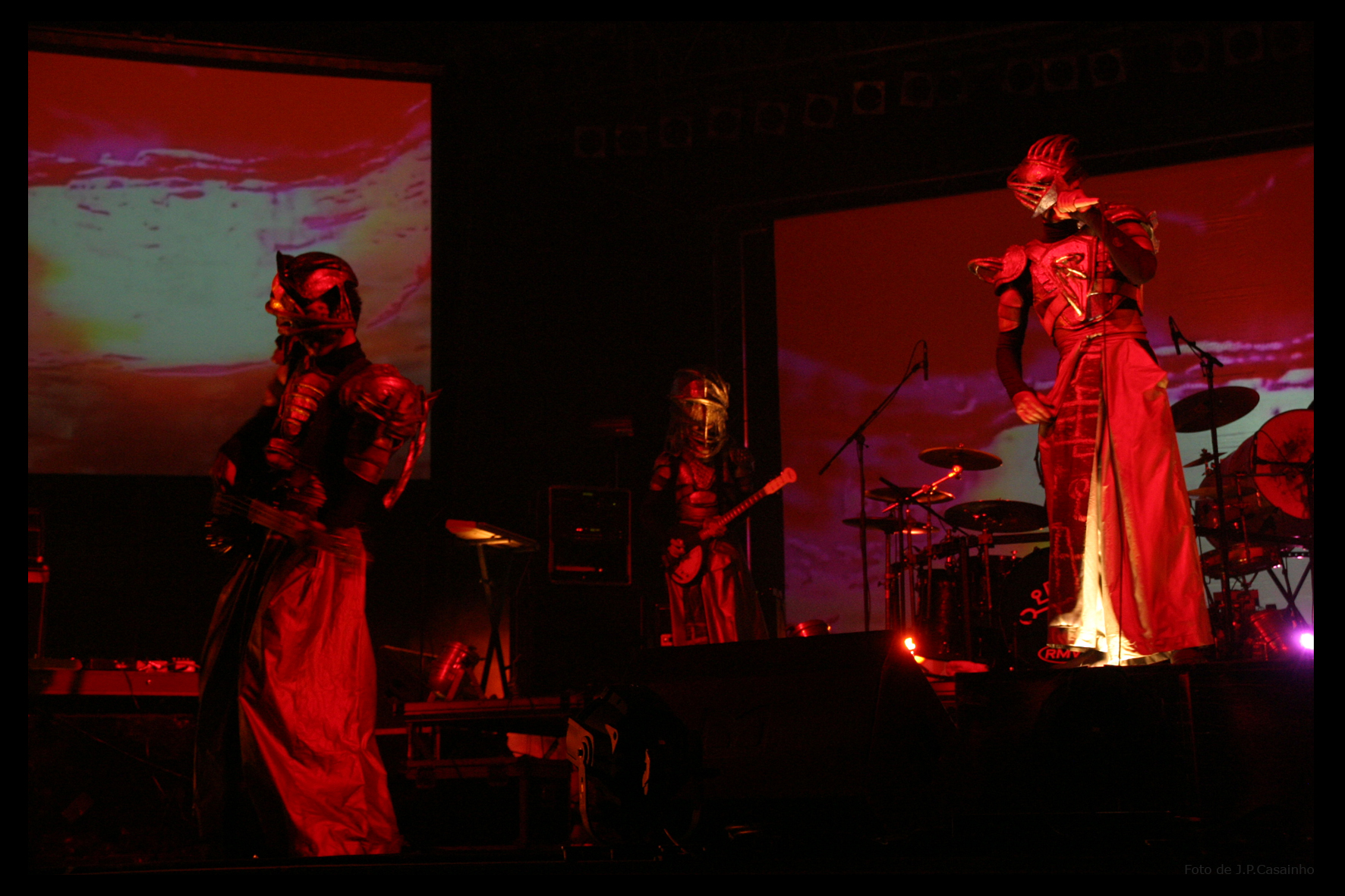

Background information
- Origin: Lisbon, Portugal
- Genres: Electronic rock, alternative rock, world music
- Years active: 1995–present
- Label: Toolateman
- Members: Guitshu: Vocals (since 2008); Riic Wolf: Vocals (since 2018); Valdjiu: Bambuleco, Kalachakra; Ary: Bass; Fred Stone: Drums; Winga: Percussion
- Past members: Karkov: Vocals (until 2008); Miguel Cardona: Guitar; Zymon: Electric guitar, sitar, keyboards Salvatori Tiliba: Didgeridoo; Castora: Percussion
- Website: www.blastedmechanism.com

Blasted Mechanism is a Portuguese electro-rock band known for its highly theatrical live shows involving elaborated alien-themed costumes as a backdrop to their music. The band was founded in 1995 by Karkov and Valdjiu. New members joined later to form the current line up. As they like to put it "they weren't created but invented", blasting into the Portuguese music scene with a very different sound and visuals.

They quickly became known for their audiovisual performances involving alien and tribal looking musicians and an irreverent, upbeat attitude. Over the years, they developed a unique musical style that mixes alternative rock, electronic music, reggae, dub and folk.

In 2005 Blasted Mechanism released album Avatara. It reached the top of the Portuguese album chart.

== Discography ==
=== Studio albums ===
Year	Album details
1999	Plasma: Release date: 1 January 1999; Label: Candy Factory
2000	Mix 00: Release date: 2000; Label: Candy Factory
2003	Namaste: Release date: 2003; Label: Metrodiscos
2005	Avatara: Release date: 31 May 2005; Label: Universal Music Portugal
2007	Sound in Light / Light in Sound: Release date: 2007; Label: Universal Music Portugal
2009	Mind at Large: Release date: 2009; Label: Toolateman
2012	Blasted Generation: Release date: 2012; Label:
2015	Egotronic: Release date: 2015; Label:

=== EPs ===
Year	Album details
1996	Swinging with the Monkeys
1997	Balayashi

=== Singles ===
Year	Single details
2003	"Namaste"
2005	"Singlmix 00"
2005	"Singlmix 01"
2007	"All the Way"
2007	"Battle of Tribes"

=== DVD ===
Year	Video details
2004	1996 - 2004: Released: 2004
