= Ídolos season 2 =

Ídolos
- Season 2
- Hosted by: Pedro Granger; Sílvia Alberto
- Judges: Manuel Moura dos Santos; Luis Jardim; Sofia Morais; Ramón Galarza
- Winner: Sérgio Lucas
- Runner-up: Raquel Guerra

Release
- Original network: SIC
- Original release: September 3, 2004 – January 14, 2005

Season chronology
- ← Previous; Season 1

Ídolos Portugal (season 2) was the second season of Ídolos. Sérgio Lucas won over Raquel Guerra.

== Finals ==
=== Finalists ===
(ages stated at time of contest)

Contestant	Age	Hometown	Voted Off	Liveshow Theme
Sérgio Lucas	28	São Pedro do Sul	Winner	Grand Finale
Raquel Guerra	19	Elvas	January 14, 2005	Grand Finale
André Pimenta	22	Porto	January 7, 2005	Film Hits
Gonçalo Oliveira	24	Alcácer do Sal	December 31, 2004	Hits of Madonna & Robbie Williams
Gabriela	19	Lamego	December 24, 2004	Love Songs
Luciana Abreu	19	Gaia	December 17, 2004	70s Hits
Helena Fernandes	21	Famalicão	December 10, 2004	Disco Hits
Paulo	23	Coimbra	December 3, 2004	Viewers' Choice
Nuno Lopes	22	Miratejo	November 26, 2004	Portuguese Hits
Ruben Louw	22	Gaia	November 19, 2004	My Idol
Daniela	19	Paços de Ferreira	November 19, 2004	My Idol

=== Live show details ===
==== Heat 1 (13 October 2004) ====
Artist	Song (original artists)	Result
Ângelo Custódio	"A carta" (Milionário & José Rico)	Eliminated
Gonçalo Oliveira	"Séra sempre um olhar" (Pedro Miguéis)	Advanced
Helena Fernandes	"Foolish Games" (Jewel)	Eliminated
Inês David	"My Immortal" (Evanescence)	Eliminated
Jean Cremona	"Bem que se quis" (Marisa Monte)	Eliminated
Liliana Madaleno	"Alma Vazia" (Silveira & Silveirinha)	Eliminated
Luciana Abreu	"The Voice Within" (Christina Aguilera)	Advanced
Nuno Lopes	"Love's Divine" (Seal)	Eliminated

Notes

- Luciana Abreu and Gonçalo Oliveira advanced to the top 11 of the competition. The other 6 contestants were eliminated.
- Helena Fernandes, Inês David and Nuno Lopes returned for a second chance at the top 11 in the Wildcard Round.

==== Heat 2 (20 October 2004) ====
Artist	Song (original artists)	Result
André Pimenta	"Great Balls of Fire" (Jerry Lee Lewis)	Eliminated
Daniela	"You Gotta Be" (Des'ree)	Advanced
Ivo	"Sorry Seems to Be the Hardest Word" (Elton John)	Eliminated
Joana Mendia	"Eu não sei quem te perdeu" (Pedro Abrunhosa)	Eliminated
Leandro	"Nada de nada" ()	Eliminated
Pedro	"Paixão" ()	Eliminated
Raquel Guerra	"Beautiful" (Christina Aguilera)	Advanced
Rute	"Straight from the Heart" ()	Eliminated

Notes

- Raquel Guerra and Daniela advanced to the top 11 of the competition. The other 6 contestants were eliminated.
- André Pimenta, Ivo & Joana Mendia returned for a second chance at the top 11 in the Wildcard Round.

==== Heat 3 (27 October 2004) ====
Artist	Song (original artists)	Result
Ana	"GoldenEye" (Tina Turner)	Eliminated
Gabriela	"Grita, sente" (Diana Basto)	Advanced
Mónica	"Life for Rent" (Dido)	Eliminated
Paulo	"Drops of Jupiter (Tell Me)" (Train)	Eliminated
Ruben Louw	"Melancholic Ballad (For The Leftlovers)" (Fingertips)	Eliminated
Sérgio Lucas	"With or Without You" (U2)	Advanced
Telma	"Dava tudo" (Adelaide Ferreira)	Eliminated
Vanessa	"I Thought You Would Leave" ()	Eliminated

Notes

- Sérgio Lucas and Gabriela advanced to the top 11 of the competition. The other 6 contestants were eliminated.
- Paulo and Ruben Louw returned for a second chance at the top 11 in the Wildcard Round.

==== Wildcard round (3 November 2004) ====
Artist	Song (original artists)	Result
André Pimenta	"Canção do engate" (António Variações)	Eliminated
Helena Fernandes	"Longe do mundo" (Sara Tavares)	Advanced
Inês David	"Somebody to Love" (Queen)	Eliminated
Ivo	"Careless Whisper" (George Michael)	Eliminated
Joana Mendia	"Let It Rain" (Amanda Marshall)	Eliminated
Nuno Lopes	"Adeus Tristeza" (Fernando Tordo)	Advanced
Paulo	"Here Without You" (3 Doors Down)	Advanced
Ruben Louw	"Against All Odds (Take a Look at Me Now)" (Phil Collins)	Advanced

Notes

- The judges selected Helena Fernandes and Ruben Louw to move on into the Top 11 of the competition, before the hosts revealed the Top 4 vote getters. Paulo and Nuno Lopes received the highest number of votes, and advanced to the top 11 of the competition.
- André Pimenta won the Jury Joker, and completed the top 11.

==== Live Show 1 (19 November 2004) ====
Theme: My Idol

Artist	Song (original artists)	Result
André Pimenta	"You Can Leave Your Hat On" (Joe Cocker)	Safe
Daniela	"Lady Marmalade" (Christina Aguilera, Pink, Lil' Kim & Mýa)	Eliminated
Gabriela	"Left Outside Alone" (Anastacia)	Safe
Gonçalo Oliveira	"Sexual Healing" (Marvin Gaye)	Safe
Helena Fernandes	"Sopro do Coração" (Clã)	Safe
Luciana Abreu	"Run to You" (Whitney Houston)	Safe
Nuno Lopes	"The Great Pretender" (The Platters)	Safe
Paulo	"This Love" (Maroon 5)	Bottom three
Raquel Guerra	"If I Ain't Got You" (Alicia Keys)	Safe
Ruben Louw	"Feel" (Robbie Williams)	Eliminated
Sérgio Lucas	"Still Loving You" (Scorpions)	Safe

==== Live Show 2 (26 November 2004) ====
Theme: Portuguese Hits

Artist	Song (original artists)	Result
André Pimenta	"Chico fininho" (Rui Veloso)	Safe
Gabriela	"Escolhas" (Sara Tavares)	Safe
Gonçalo Oliveira	"Aprender a ser feliz" (Pólo Norte)	Safe
Helena Fernandes	"Contigo" ()	Bottom two
Luciana Abreu	"Povo que lavas no rio" (Amália Rodrigues)	Safe
Nuno Lopes	"A minha música" (José Cid)	Eliminated
Paulo	"Sangue oculto" (GNR)	Safe
Raquel Guerra	"Tudo o que eu te dou" (Pedro Abrunhosa)	Safe
Sérgio Lucas	"Longe de ti" (Império dos Sentados)	Safe

==== Live Show 3 (3 December 2004) ====
Theme: Viewers' Choice

Artist	Song (original artists)	Result
André Pimenta	"She's So High" (Tal Bachman)	Safe
Gabriela	"Angels" (Robbie Williams)	Bottom two
Gonçalo Oliveira	"Walking Away" (Craig David)	Safe
Helena Fernandes	"Don't Know Why" (Norah Jones)	Safe
Luciana Abreu	"Fallin'" (Alicia Keys)	Safe
Paulo	"Life Is a Rollercoaster" (Ronan Keating)	Eliminated
Raquel Guerra	"I'm with You" (Avril Lavigne)	Safe
Sérgio Lucas	"The Scientist" (Coldplay)	Safe

==== Live Show 4 (10 December 2004) ====
Theme: Disco Hits

Artist	Song (original artists)	Result
André Pimenta	"You Sexy Thing" (Hot Chocolate)	Safe
Gabriela	"It's Raining Men" (The Weather Girls)	Safe
Gonçalo Oliveira	"Love Is in the Air" (John Paul Young)	Bottom two
Helena Fernandes	"Don't Leave Me This Way" (Thelma Houston)	Eliminated
Luciana Abreu	"I Will Survive" (Gloria Gaynor)	Safe
Raquel Guerra	"Fame" (Irene Cara)	Safe
Sérgio Lucas	"That's the Way (I Like It)" (KC and the Sunshine Band)	Safe

==== Live Show 5 (17 December 2004) ====
Theme: 70s Hits

Artist	Song (original artists)	Result
André Pimenta	"Não posso mais" (Pedro Abrunhosa)	Safe
Gabriela	"Dançar na corda bamba" (Clã)	Safe
Gonçalo Oliveira	"Cairo" (Taxi)	Bottom two
Luciana Abreu	"Sympathy for the Devil" (The Rolling Stones)	Eliminated
Raquel Guerra	"Is This Love" (Bob Marley and the Wailers)	Safe
Sérgio Lucas	"Superstition" (Stevie Wonder)	Safe

==== Live Show 6 (24 December 2004) ====
Theme: Love Songs

Artist	Song (original artists)	Result
André Pimenta	"Every Breath You Take" (The Police)	Safe
Gabriela	"You're Still the One" (Shania Twain)	Eliminated
Gonçalo Oliveira	"If You Don't Know Me by Now" (Simply Red)	Bottom two
Raquel Guerra	"Un-Break My Heart" (Toni Braxton)	Safe
Sérgio Lucas	"Crazy Little Thing Called Love" (Queen)	Safe

==== Live Show 7 (31 December 2004) ====
Theme: Hits of Madonna & Robbie Williams

Artist	First song (original artists)	Second song	Result
André Pimenta	"Something Beautiful" (Robbie Williams)	"Let Me Entertain You" (Robbie Williams)	Safe
Gonçalo Oliveira	"La Isla Bonita" (Madonna)	"She's the One" (Robbie Williams)	Eliminated
Raquel Guerra	"Crazy for You" (Madonna)	"Sexed Up" (Robbie Williams)	Safe
Sérgio Lucas	"Open Your Heart" (Madonna)	"Come Undone" (Robbie Williams)	Safe

==== Live Show 8: Semi-final (7 January 2005) ====
Theme: Film Hits

Artist	First song (original artists)	Second song	Result
André Pimenta	"Deixa-me rir" (Jorge Palma)	"You Make Me Feel So Young" (Frank Sinatra)	Eliminated
Raquel Guerra	"Eu sei que vou te amar" (Tom Jobim)	"(You Make Me Feel Like) A Natural Woman" (Aretha Franklin)	Safe
Sérgio Lucas	"Estou além" (António Variações)	"I Don't Want to Miss a Thing" (Aerosmith)	Safe

==== Live final (14 January 2005) ====
Artist	First song	Second song	Third song	Result
Raquel Guerra	"The Best"	"How Could an Angel Break My Heart"	"Jura"	Runner-up
Sérgio Lucas	"Star"	"Addicted to Love"	"Circo de feras"	Winner
