= Chamusca (Chamusca) =

- Civil parish
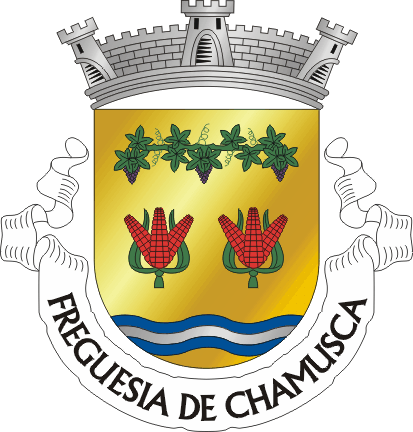
- Coat of arms

- Location in Portugal
- Coordinates: 39.359°N 8.481°W
- Country: Portugal
- Region: Oeste e Vale do Tejo
- Intermunic. comm.: Lezíria do Tejo
- District: Santarém
- Municipality: Chamusca
- Disbanded: 2013

Area
  - Total: 35.3 km^{2} (13.6 sq mi)

Population (2001)
  - Total: 3,659
  - Density: 100/km^{2} (270/sq mi)
- Time zone: UTC+00:00 (WET)
  - Summer (DST): UTC+01:00 (WEST)

Chamusca is a former civil parish in the municipality of Chamusca, Portugal. In 2013, the parish merged into the new parish Chamusca e Pinheiro Grande. It covers an area of 35.3 km² and had a population of 3,659 as of 2001.
