= Rock music in Portugal =

Rock music and its subgenres are very popular in Portugal. The history of the Portuguese rock music scene spans several decades.

== History ==
=== 1950s to 1970s ===
In the late 1950s, singer Joaquim Costa was one of the first rock artists, but it was only during the 1960s that the genre's popularity began rising, with bands such as "Quinteto Académico" and "Sheiks", who played mostly in clubs and student associations. Most of these groups played covers of American and British bands or were influenced by artists such as the Beatles and The Shadows. The rock scene's development was limited in its commercial and creative scope due to the country's isolation, which was under a strict dictatorship until 1974.

During the 1970s, and particularly after democracy was established after the 1974 Carnation Revolution, Portugal became home to an active progressive rock scene, which included bands like Tantra, Petrus Castrus, Banda do Casaco and the highly successful Quarteto 1111. During the latter part of the decade, José Cid, Quarteto 1111's vocalist and keyboardist, pursued a solo career, releasing the landmark symphonic album 10,000 Anos Depois Entre Venus E Marte before turning to mainstream pop music. Portugal's progressive rock epoch came to a close with the release of Ascenção e Queda, a rock opera by Petrus Castrus. Most of these records remain in short supply to this date.

Until the end of the 1970s, Portuguese folk music and protest songs were generally the most popular types of music - but gradually more rock bands and styles began to appear, benefiting from the country's new-found openness.

=== 1980s ===
Rock music finally hit the mainstream in 1980 with the release of Ar de Rock by Rui Veloso, which was the first popular Portuguese rock album.

During the 1980s, Veloso's blues-rock sound achieved national success and inspired the creation of several rock and roll bands, which became popular with youths growing up in the post-1974 modernized Portugal. The success of groups like Taxi, Heróis do Mar and Trabalhadores do Comércio, and UHF, indicated that a solid rock scene was growing, despite the fact that these were all relatively ephemeral projects.

Xutos & Pontapés are arguably the biggest success case in the Portuguese rock scene, having become the first band in the country to celebrate 30 years of career. Their early works had close roots to punk rock and rockabilly, but later incorporated hard rock and folk influences into their sound, becoming more diverse. UHF, another band that started in the early 80s, visually resembled the hard rock-playing hair bands that popped up in America and Europe - however, like Xutos, their sound was derived mainly from punk rock and folk influences.

Other major projects from this period include GNR, Roxigénio, Taxi and Peste & Sida, which turned to ska as an inspiration and would later switch to punk. GNR abandoned ska after two years when they changed vocalists, adopting poetic, and nonsensical lyrics, and a bigger use of synthpop sounds.

Heavy Metal began building up a following among the younger generation living and bands proliferated, especially in the North of the country. Few made it to the studio and those that did released mostly low budget singles. 1982 saw the first release of a Heavy Metal LP in the country, Forte e Feio by NZZN, but the production was poor and the record was not well received by critics. The late 1980s saw the rise of Tarantula, probably the first Portuguese Heavy Metal band with relevant impact outside the country.

During the mid-1980s, synthpop became even more prevalent in Portuguese rock, with the success of Sétima Legião and Heróis do Mar, which were heavily influenced by acts such as Joy Division, New Order, Depeche Mode and Gary Numan. Combining synthesized sounds and beats with Portuguese lyrics exalting the country's history, they attracted controversy and were accused of being political reactionaries and supportive of the extinct dictatorial regime. Heróis do Mar disbanded in 1990, but their momentum was taken over by other projects influenced not only by new wave, but also alternative rock and indie rock: Rádio Macau, Mler Ife Dada and Pop Dell'Arte, among others.

Punk rock remained mostly an underground phenomenon, although a circuit of venues and events in the country's major cities grew during this decade. Relevant punk bands to emerge during this period include Censurados, Mata Ratos and Peste & Sida.

Although most bands from this period were short-lived and none achieved international success, 1980's Portuguese rock was extremely diverse - each major band developed their own signature sound, and the national rock scene became very rich, spanning a wide variety of themes and styles.

=== 1990s ===
The 1990s were also a very creative and active decade, with openness to new trends and a growth in the music market marked by the increasing popularity of international music festivals that attracted major rock bands to the country. A handful of major 1980s rock artists (such as Rui Veloso, GNR, Xutos & Pontapés) managed to maintain and grow their careers and fan bases.

This decade was notable for the rise of very active heavy metal, underground and alternative rock scenes.

Several major bands from the 1990s achieved both national and international success and were able to continue their careers into the 21st century, including Moonspell (an internationally renowned gothic / heavy metal band from Lisbon), Mão Morta (alternative and experimental rock project with a considerable cult following), Blasted Mechanism (a theatrical, sci-fi themed band that mixes rock with electronica, reggae and dub), Zen (alternative rock band), Ena Pá 2000 (a comedy rock outfit) and Da Weasel (a rock/hip-hop fusion band).

While some of the 1990s signature rock genres such as grunge, industrial rock and nu metal were very popular with Portuguese youngsters, few Portuguese bands fully adopted these styles and none achieved great success. Exceptions include Da Weasel (who incorporated elements of nu metal in their later albums), Blind Zero (pop/rock band that started out as a grunge outfit) and Bizarra Locomotiva (industrial metal band with a sizable cult following).

On the mainstream front (pop/rock), Quinta do Bill, a folk-rock group, achieved some notoriety, and two other bands rose to prominence: Silence 4, an English-singing pop/rock act from Leiria, and Ornatos Violeta, a Portuguese-singing rock band from Porto. Despite huge national success, critical acclaim (particularly for Ornatos Violeta) and lasting influence, both groups disbanded at the turn of the millennium.

=== 2000s ===
Much like in other European and Anglo-American countries, the decade starting in 2001 saw the rise of hip-hop, dance music and more pop-oriented acts, with audiences for rock music dwindling.

Established bands who had begun their careers during the 1980s (Rui Veloso, Xutos & Pontapés) and 1990s (Moonspell, Blasted Mechanism, Mão Morta) maintained thriving careers, although the rock music scene became more fragmented and directed at niche markets. Some popular groups and projects surfaced: Toranja (pop/rock, Lisbon), Wraygunn (blues-rock collective from Coimbra) and Legendary Tiger Man (WrayGunn vocalist Paulo Furtado's solo project), and pop/rock acts influenced by electronic music such as Micro Audio Waves and Mesa. Clã, another Portuguese-singing pop/rock act who had surfaced in Porto during the mid-1990s, scored their biggest commercial hits during the 2000s decade.

=== 2010s ===
The trend continued into the 2010s, with new bands appearing and playing in a variety of rock subgenres including pop/rock (Amor Electro, Diabo na Cruz, Capitão Fausto, and Salvador Sobral's band Alexander Search), blues-rock (Black Mamba), alternative and indie rock (PAUS, peixe : avião, Linda Martini, WhosPuto), as well as heavy metal (Serrabulho, Okkultist). This decade also saw a niche revival of psychedelic and stoner rock with artists like Black Wizards, The Quartet of Woah! and krautrock-influenced band 10000 Russos.

== See also ==
- Music of Portugal
