= Castle of Alcanede =

Building in Santarém, Santarém District, Portugal

- Castelo de Alcanede
- Santarem, Lezíria do Tejo, Centro in Portugal
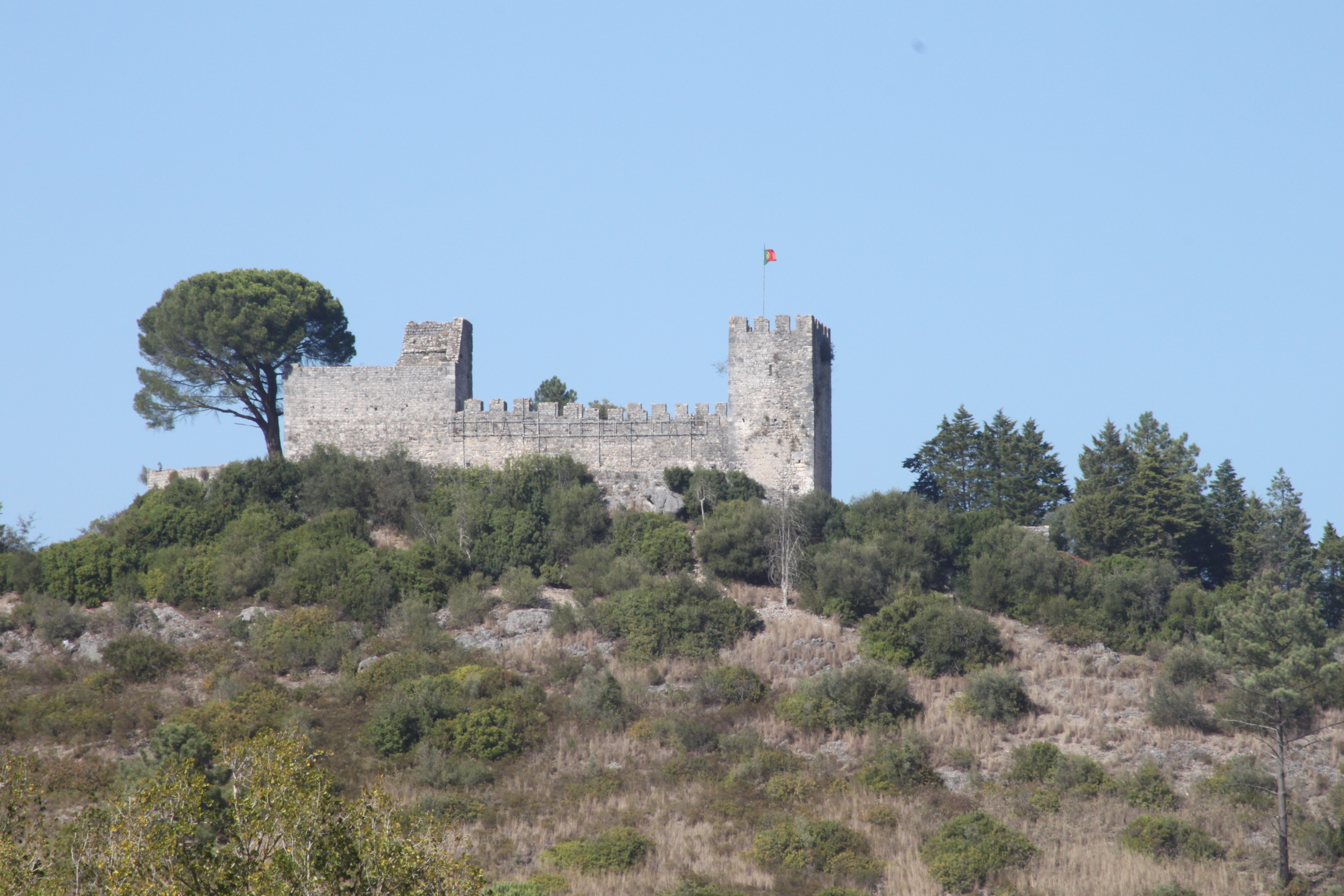
- A view of the Castle of Alcanede from below

Site information
- Type: Castle
- Owner: Portuguese Republic
- Operator: DGPC (Decreee 115/2012; Diário da República, Série 1, 102, 25 May 2012)
- Open to the public: Public

Location
- Coordinates: 39°25′2″N 8°49′17″W

Site history
- Built: 49 B.C.
- Materials: Masonry, Brick

The Castle of Alcanede (Portuguese: Castelo de Alcanede), is a Portuguese medieval castle in civil parish of Alcanede, in the municipality of Santarém, in the Ribatejo district of Santarém.

== History ==
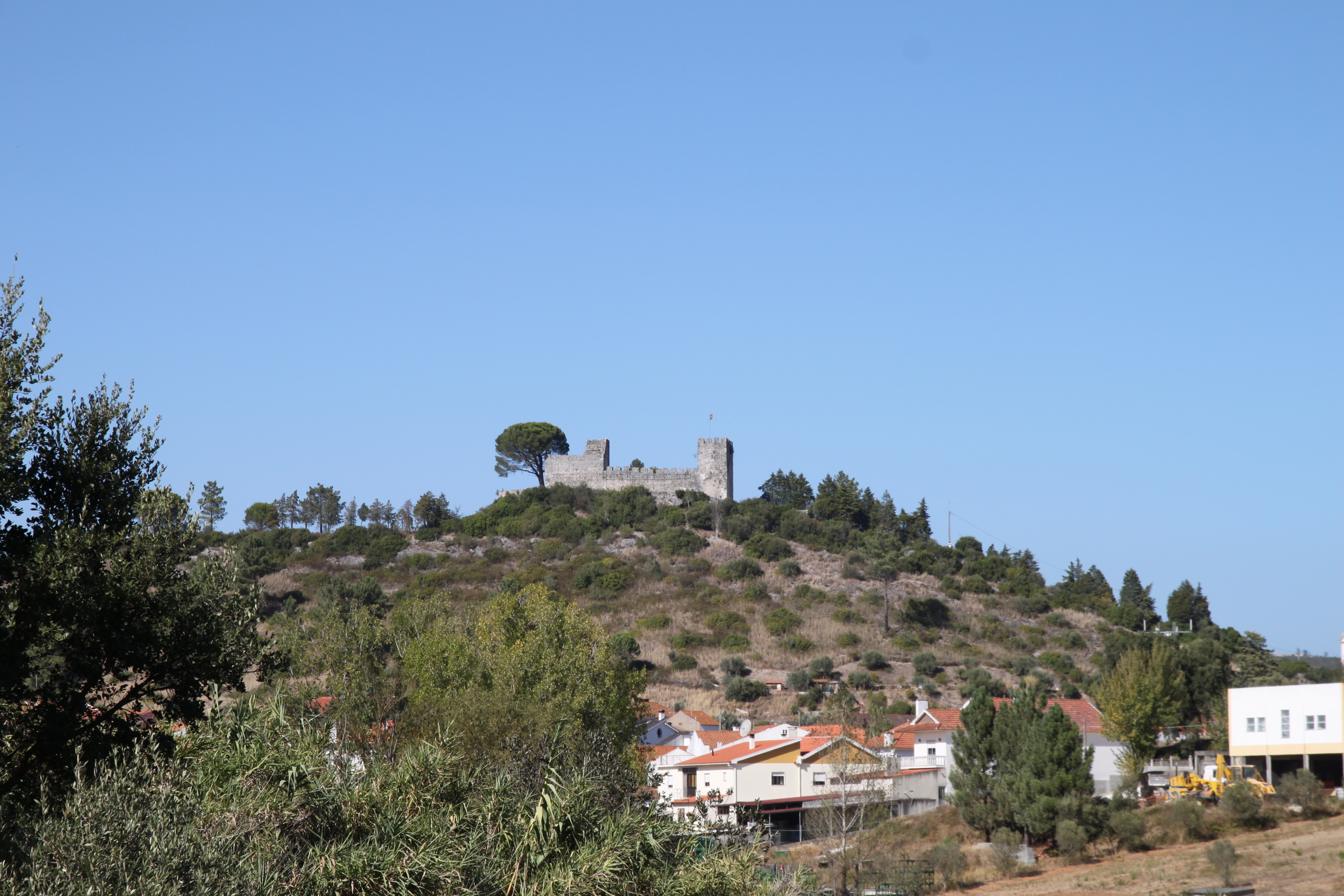
A distant perspective of the castle as it looks from the valley

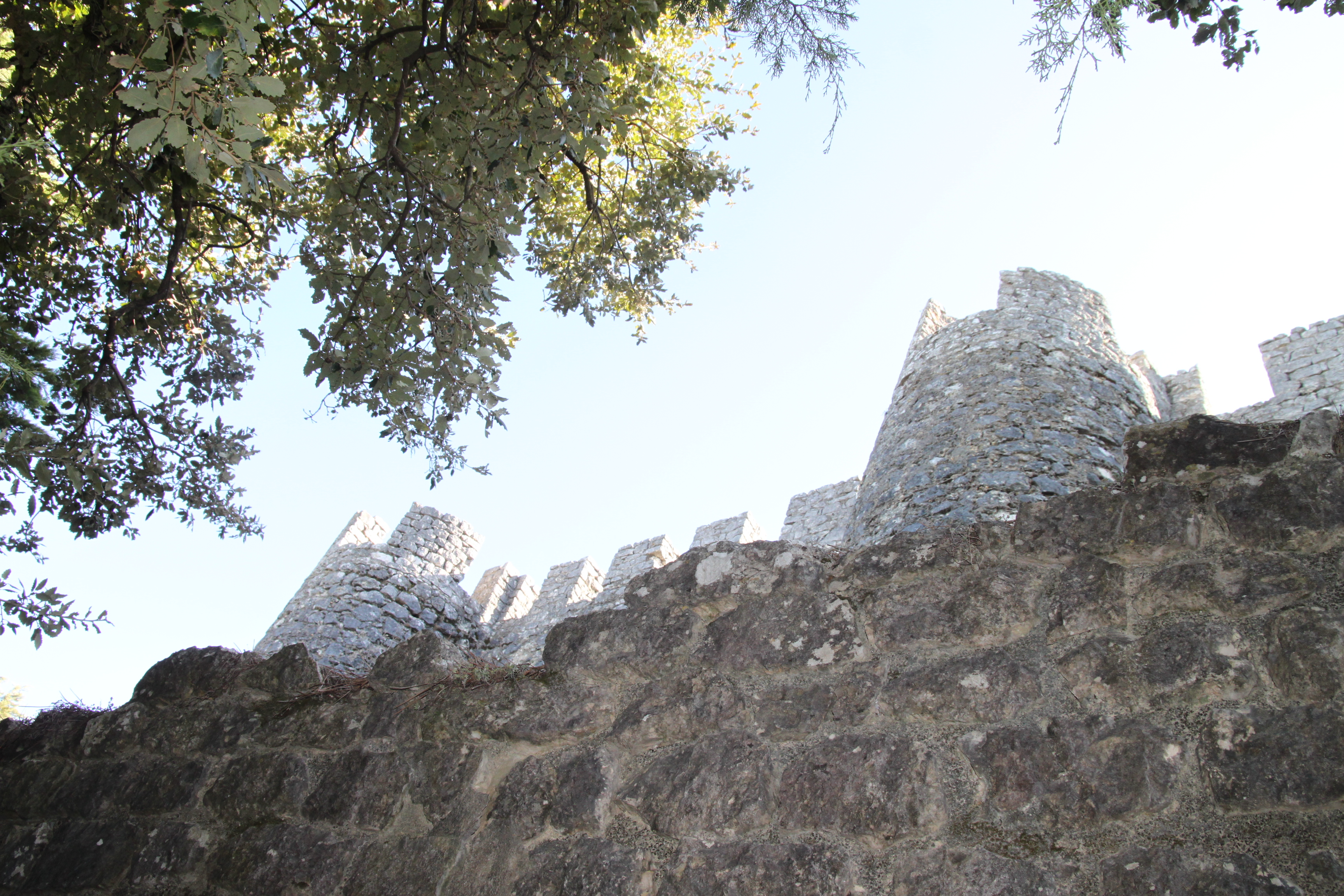
A view of the walls and towers from the entranceway

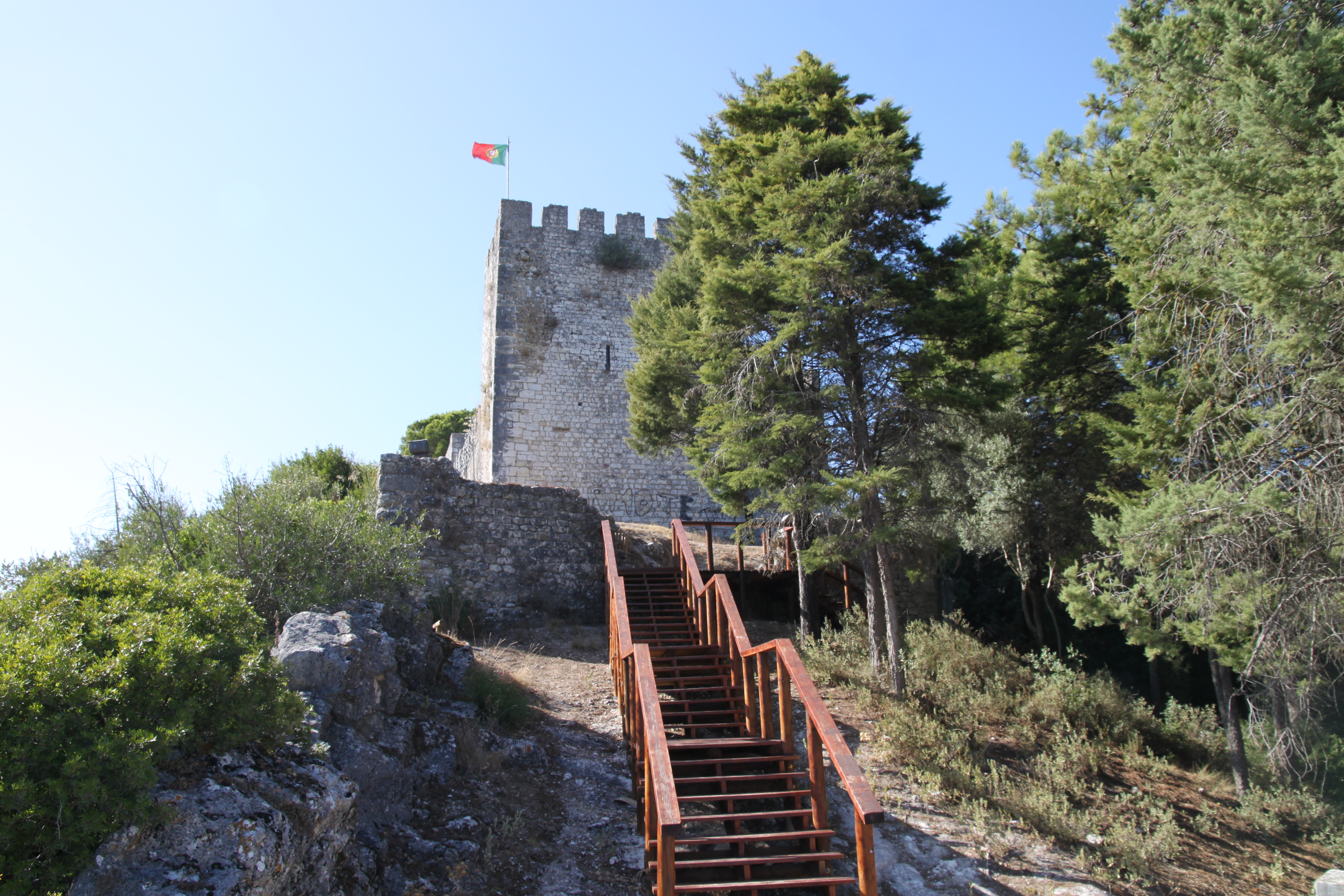
The walkway to the top of the keep tower

Taken by the Romans in 49 B.C. the castro structure was expanded and successively occupied by Alans and Moors.

In 1091, the castle was conquered by forces loyal to Count D. Henrique.

In the course of political expansion and dominion, it was reconquered in the 12th century by D. Afonso Henriques who issued a foral (charter) for new settlers. Around 1163, though, it was donated to Gonçalo Mendes de Sousa, alcalde, who reconstructed the structure at his own cost.

In 1187, it was donated to the Order of the Knights Templar by King D. Sancho I.

This transfer was confirmed in a letter in 1300 by King D. Dinis. But, within a few years (1318) its title was transferred to the Order of Aviz. During this period the important construction of the keep tower, with its crown of merlons, was undertaken.

In 1370, during the reign of King D. Ferdinand, the men of Alcanede were free to participate in the work on the castle of Santarém, as long as they were able to maintain the walls in Alcanede.

A new foral was issued in 1514 by King D. Manuel, marking a period of prosperity for the town. In addition to the foral, the King also paid for part of the work on the castle and the parochial church, even as the extent of the interventions are largely unknown.

On 28 February 1531, the structure was totally destroyed during the course of an earthquake that affected the entirety of the Portuguese Estremadura. Losing much of its military function, the strategic importance decreased and there was little interest by the Crown or Order of Aviz to reconstruct the castle.

In 1936 the structure was discovered in a state of almost complete ruin, existing only "a few curtain walls in continuous disaggregation and two corners".

Work on recuperating and restoring the structure began in 1941 following the same vestiges that existed. Between 1944 and 1949 progress continued on repairing the walls, towers and barbican, including construction of a staircase and the vaulted ceiling in the tower. In 1954 new public works were undertake to consolidate the fortification, which were repeated in 1973, with repairs in the parapets of the walls.

As part of a heritage designation, on 1 June 1992, the property was transferred to the possession of the Instituto Português do Património Arquitetónico (Portuguese Institute for Architectural Patrimony) by decree 106F/92 (Diário da Repúblic, Série 1A, 126). On 20 December 2007, its title was transferred to the regional Direção Regional da Cultura de Lisboa e Vale do Tejo (Regional Directorate for Culture for Lisbon and Tagus Valley), under dispatch 1130/2007 (Diário da Repúblic, Série 2, 245), confirmed in a similar dispatch on 24 August 2009.

== Architecture ==
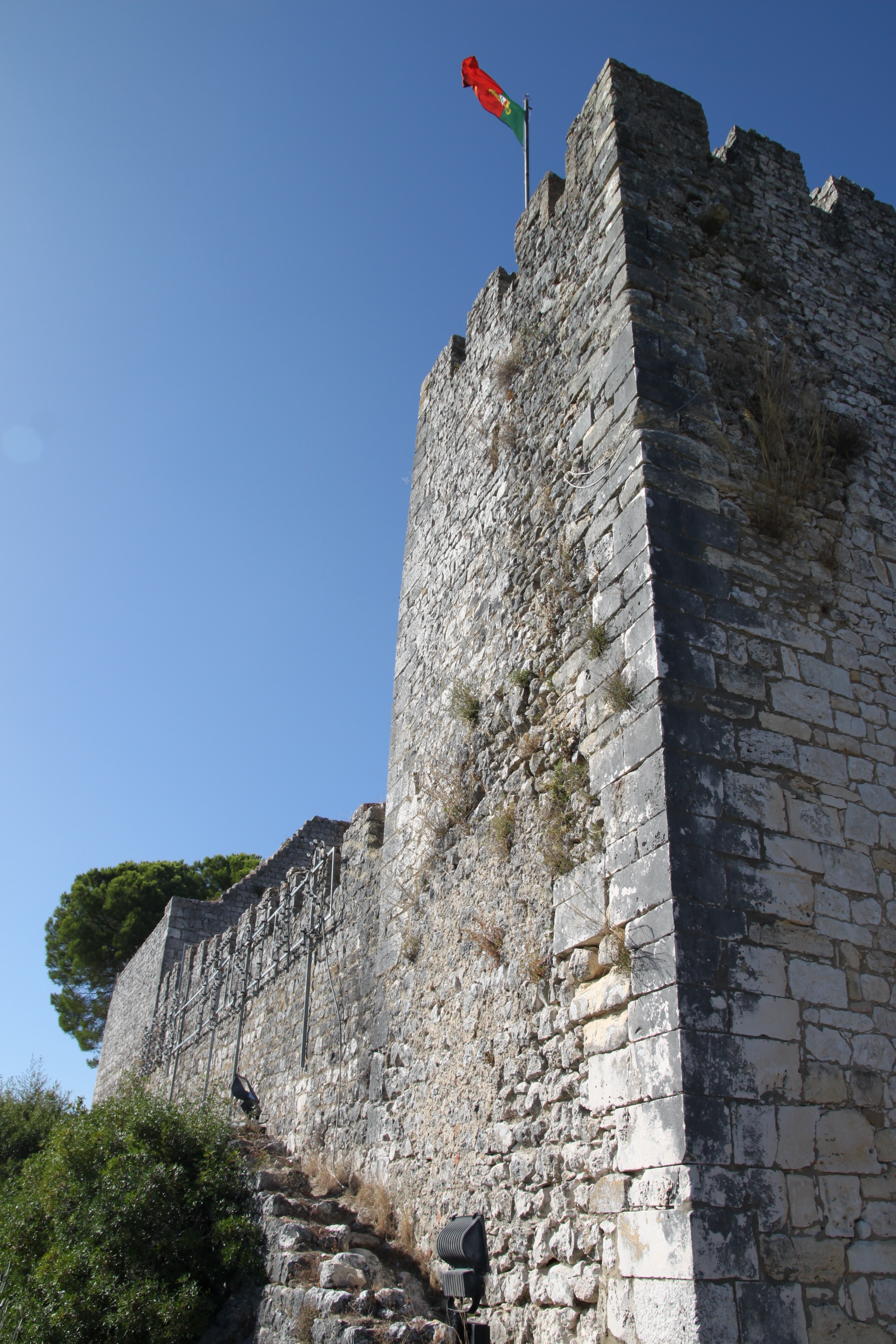
A view of a watchtower and fortification walls

The castle is situated in a rural position, isolated at the top of a hilltop, encircled by deep vegetation, its principal structures oriented towards the east.
