= Ídolos season 1 =

Ídolos
- Season 1
- Hosted by: Pedro Granger; Sílvia Alberto
- Judges: Manuel Moura dos Santos; Luis Jardim; Sofia Morais; Ramón Galarza
- Winner: Nuno Norte
- Runner-up: Ricardo Oliveira

Release
- Original network: SIC
- Original release: September 5, 2003 – January 2, 2004

Season chronology
- Next → Season 2

Ídolos Portugal (season 1) was the first season of Ídolos. Nuno Norte won over Ricardo Oliveira.

== Finals ==
=== Finalists ===
(ages stated at time of contest)

Contestant	Age	Hometown	Voted Off	Liveshow Theme
Nuno Norte	26	Seixal	Winner	Grand Finale
Ricardo Oliveira	23	Entroncamento	January 2, 2004	Grand Finale
Luísa Sobral	16	Lisbon	December 26, 2003	Judges' Choice
Rita Silva	19	Gaia	December 19, 2003	Christmas Songs
Bruna Andrade	20	Paços de Brandão	December 12, 2003	Songs of My Childhood
Débora Gonçalves	18	Massamá	December 5, 2003	Portuguese Songs
David Cruz	19	Buraca	November 28, 2003	Latin American Songs
Nádia Pimentel	22	Albufeira	November 21, 2003	My Parents' Idol
Carla Sofia	25	Lisbon	November 14, 2003	Film Hits
Dércio Moreira	22	Barreiro	November 7, 2003	My Idol

=== Live show details ===
==== Heat 1 (3 October 2003) ====
Artist	Song (original artists)	Result
Carla Melício	"Foolish Games" (Jewel)	Eliminated
Carla Viegas	"" ()	Eliminated
David Cruz	"Corazón partío" (Alejandro Sanz)	Advanced
Dércio Moreira	"If Tomorrow Never Comes" (Ronan Keating)	Advanced
Diana Lucas	"Longe do mundo" (Sara Tavares)	Eliminated
Fernando	"" ()	Eliminated
Hugo Marques	"Leaning on the Everlasting Arms" (Iris DeMent)	Eliminated
Jennifer	"" ()	Eliminated
Nuno Norte	"Purple Rain" (Prince)	Advanced
Patrícia Flora	"Respect" (Aretha Franklin)	Eliminated

Notes

- Nuno Norte, David Cruz and Dércio Moreira advanced to the top 10 of the competition. The other 7 contestants were eliminated.
- Diana Lucas returned for a second chance at the top 10 in the Wildcard Round.

==== Heat 2 (10 October 2003) ====
Artist	Song (original artists)	Result
Alexandra	"" ()	Eliminated
Ângela	"" ()	Eliminated
Aurélio	"" ()	Eliminated
Bruna Andrade	"Eu sei" (Sara Tavares)	Advanced
Carla Moreno	"" ()	Eliminated
Carla Sofia	"Fallin'" (Alicia Keys)	Advanced
Luísa Sobral	"Sacrifice" (Elton John)	Eliminated
Ricardo Oliveira	"(Sittin' On) The Dock of the Bay" (Otis Redding)	Advanced
Rui Andrade	"Feel" (Robbie Williams)	Eliminated
Tiago Mendonca	"" ()	Eliminated

Notes

- Ricardo Oliveira, Bruna Andrade and Carla Sofia advanced to the top 10 of the competition. The other 7 contestants were eliminated.
- Luísa Sobral and Rui Andrade returned for a second chance at the top 10 in the Wildcard Round.

==== Heat 3 (17 October 2003) ====
Artist	Song (original artists)	Result
Andreia Machado	"Mais olhos que barriga" (Susana Félix)	Eliminated
Débora Gonçalves	"Inside My Love" (Juanita Dailey)	Advanced
Emanuel Pereira	"Can You Feel the Love Tonight" (Elton John)	Eliminated
Fernando Messias	"Homem do Leme" (Xutos & Pontapés)	Eliminated
Francisco Gomes	"Ouvi dizer" (Ornatos Violeta)	Eliminated
Mariline Hortigueira	"Sopro do Coração" (Clã)	Advanced
Nádia Pimentel	"Jardins proibidos" (Paulo Gonzo)	Eliminated
Rita Silva	"Reach" (Gloria Estefan)	Advanced
Rúben Patrício	"I Swear" (All-4-One)	Eliminated
Sandro Carvalho	"Angels" (Robbie Williams)	Eliminated

Notes

- Rita Silva, Mariline Hortigueira and Débora Gonçalves advanced to the top 10 of the competition. The other 7 contestants were eliminated.
- Andreia Machado, Emanuel Pereira, Nádia Pimentel and Rúben Patrício returned for a second chance at the top 10 in the Wildcard Round.

==== Wildcard round (24 October 2003) ====
Artist	Song (original artists)	Result
Andreia Machado	"Grita, sente" (Diana Basto)	Eliminated
Diane Lucas	"Em cada lugar teu" (Mafalda Veiga)	Eliminated
Emanuel Pereira	"Deixa-me olhar" (Alémmar)	Eliminated
Luísa Sobral	"Perdidamente" (Ala dos Namorados)	Advanced
Nádia Pimentel	"Porto Côvo" (Rui Veloso)	Eliminated
Rúben Patrício	"Será sempre um olhar" (Pedro Miguéis)	Eliminated
Rui Andrade	"Jura" (Rui Veloso)	Eliminated

Notes

- Luísa Sobral received the highest number of votes, and completed the top 10.

==== Live Show 1 (7 November 2003) ====
Theme: My Idol

Artist	Song (original artists)	Result
Mariline Hortigueira	N/A	Withdrew
Bruna Andrade	"The Greatest Love of All" (Whitney Houston)	Safe
Carla Sofia	"Get Here" (Oleta Adams)	Bottom two
David Cruz	"Englishman in New York" (Sting)	Safe
Débora Gonçalves	"How Could an Angel Break My Heart" (Toni Braxton)	Safe
Dércio Moreira	"The One" (Elton John)	Eliminated
Luísa Sobral	"Objection (Tango)" (Shakira)	Safe
Nádia Pimentel	"Nobody's Wife" (Anouk)	Safe
Nuno Norte	"Blaze of Glory" (Jon Bon Jovi)	Safe
Ricardo Oliveira	"Careless Whisper" (George Michael)	Safe
Rita Silva	"The Power of Love" (Jennifer Rush)	Safe

==== Live Show 2 (14 November 2003) ====
Theme: Film Hits

Artist	Song (original artists)	Result
Bruna Andrade	"Run to You" (Whitney Houston)	Safe
Carla Sofia	"My Heart Will Go On" (Celine Dion)	Eliminated
David Cruz	"When a Man Loves a Woman" (Percy Sledge)	Safe
Débora Gonçalves	"Against All Odds (Take a Look at Me Now)" (Mariah Carey)	Safe
Luísa Sobral	"Out of Reach" (Gabrielle)	Safe
Nádia Pimentel	"Kissing You" (Des'ree)	Bottom two
Nuno Norte	"Your Song" (Elton John)	Safe
Ricardo Oliveira	"I Don't Want to Miss a Thing" (Aerosmith)	Safe
Rita Silva	"Can't Fight the Moonlight" (LeAnn Rimes)	Safe

==== Live Show 3 (21 November 2003) ====
Theme: My Parents' Idol

Artist	Song (original artists)	Result
Bruna Andrade	"Ele e ela" (Madalena Iglésias)	Bottom two
David Cruz	"Sexual Healing" (Marvin Gaye)	Safe
Débora Gonçalves	"You Can't Hurry Love" (The Supremes)	Safe
Luísa Sobral	"The House of the Rising Sun" (The Animals)	Safe
Nádia Pimentel	"Desfolhada" (Simone de Oliveira)	Eliminated
Nuno Norte	"Olhos castanhos" (Francisco José)	Safe
Ricardo Oliveira	"Vocês sabem lá" (Maria de Fátima Bravo)	Safe
Rita Silva	"Puppet on a String" (Sandie Shaw)	Safe

==== Live Show 4 (28 November 2003) ====
Theme: Latin American Songs

Artist	Song (original artists)	Result
Bruna Andrade	"Mi Tierra" (Gloria Estefan)	Safe
David Cruz	"Flor de Lis" (Djavan)	Eliminated
Débora Gonçalves	"Desafinado" (Tom Jobim)	Safe
Luísa Sobral	"Próprias mentiras" (Deborah Blando)	Bottom two
Nuno Norte	"Perfidia" (Luis Miguel)	Safe
Ricardo Oliveira	"Corazón Espinado" (Santana)	Safe
Rita Silva	"Swing da Cor" (Daniela Mercury)	Safe

==== Live Show 5 (5 December 2003) ====
Theme: Portuguese Songs

Artist	Song (original artists)	Result
Bruna Andrade	"Na Cabana Junto à Praia" (José Cid)	Safe
Débora Gonçalves	"Sinfonia do Amor" (Blackout)	Eliminated
Luísa Sobral	"Tudo o que eu te dou" (Pedro Abrunhosa)	Safe
Nuno Norte	"Porto Sentido" (Rui Veloso)	Safe
Ricardo Oliveira	"Dá-me luz" (Francisco Mendes)	Bottom two
Rita Silva	"O Anzol" (Rádio Macau)	Safe

==== Live Show 6 (12 December 2003) ====
Theme: Songs of My Childhood

Artist	Song (original artists)	Result
Bruna Andrade	"Papel principal" (Adelaide Ferreira)	Eliminated
Luísa Sobral	"Cavaleiro Andante" (Rui Veloso)	Safe
Nuno Norte	"Hotel California" (Eagles)	Safe
Ricardo Oliveira	"Crazy Little Thing Called Love" (Queen)	Safe
Rita Silva	"Cinderela" (Carlos Paião)	Bottom two

==== Live Show 7 (19 December 2003) ====
Theme: Christmas Songs

Artist	First song (original artists)	Second song	Result
Luísa Sobral	"Happy Xmas (War Is Over)" (John Lennon)	"Santa Claus Is Coming to Town" (Various artists)	Safe
Nuno Norte	"Jingle Bell Rock" (Bobby Helms)	"Let It Snow! Let It Snow! Let It Snow!" (Dean Martin)	Safe
Ricardo Oliveira	"Have Yourself a Merry Little Christmas" (Judy Garland)	"Last Christmas" (Wham!)	Safe
Rita Silva	"All I Want for Christmas Is You" (Mariah Carey)	"Presépio de lata" (Rui Veloso)	Eliminated

==== Live Show 8: Semi-final (26 December 2003) ====
Theme: Judges' Choice

Artist	First song (original artists)	Second song	Result
Luísa Sobral	"I'm Not in Love" (10cc)	"Venham mais cinco" (Zeca Afonso)	Eliminated
Nuno Norte	"Kiss" (Prince)	"Chuva dissolvente" (Xutos & Pontapés)	Safe
Ricardo Oliveira	"You Are the Sunshine of My Life" (Stevie Wonder)	"Deixa-me rir" (Jorge Palma)	Safe

==== Live final (2 January 2004) ====
Artist	First song	Second song	Third song	Result
Nuno Norte	"Come Undone"	"Fala-me de amor"	"My Way"	Winner
Ricardo Oliveira	"Chamar a música"	"Every Breath You Take"	"Porto Côvo"	Runner-up
