= Pinheiro Grande =

- Civil parish
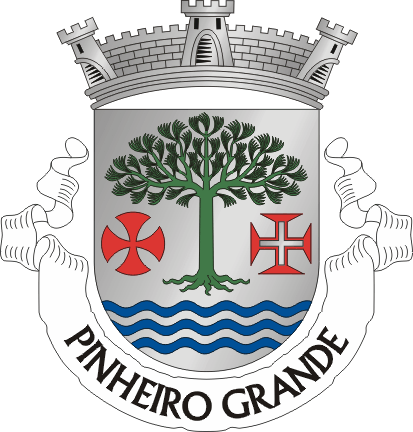
- Coat of arms

- Location in Portugal
- Coordinates: 39.393°N 8.437°W
- Country: Portugal
- Region: Oeste e Vale do Tejo
- Intermunic. comm.: Lezíria do Tejo
- District: Santarém
- Municipality: Chamusca
- Disbanded: 2013

Area
  - Total: 32.16 km^{2} (12.42 sq mi)

Population (2001)
  - Total: 1,051
  - Density: 33/km^{2} (85/sq mi)
- Time zone: UTC+00:00 (WET)
  - Summer (DST): UTC+01:00 (WEST)

Pinheiro Grande is a former civil parish in the municipality of Chamusca, Portugal. In 2013, the parish merged into the new parish Chamusca e Pinheiro Grande. It covers an area of 32.16 km^{2} and had a population of 1,051 as of 2001.
