= Alpiarça =

- Municipality
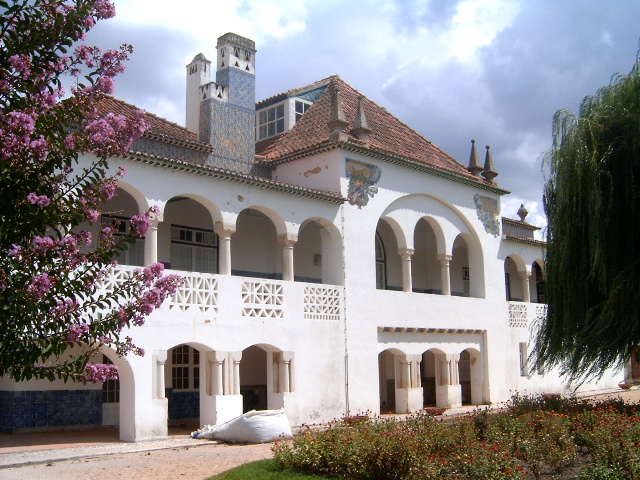
- Casa dos Patudos, Alpiarça

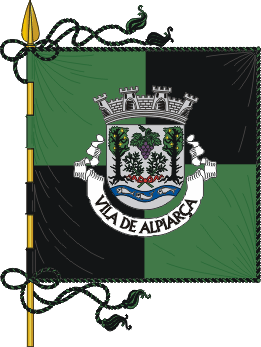
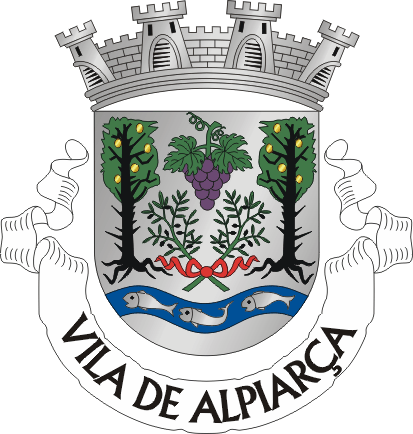
- Flag Coat of arms
- Interactive map of Alpiarça
- Location in Portugal
- Coordinates: 39°15′N 8°34′W
- Country: Portugal
- Region: Oeste e Vale do Tejo
- Intermunic. comm.: Lezíria do Tejo
- District: Santarém
- Seat: Alpiarça Municipal Chamber
- Parishes: 1

Government
  - President: Mário Fernando Pereira (CDU)

Area
  - Total: 95.36 km^{2} (36.82 sq mi)

Population (2011)
  - Total: 7,702
  - Density: 80.77/km^{2} (209.2/sq mi)
- Time zone: UTC+00:00 (WET)
  - Summer (DST): UTC+01:00 (WEST)
- Local holiday: April 2
- Website: www.cm-alpiarca.pt

Alpiarça (Portuguese pronunciation: [alpiˈaɾsɐ]) is a municipality in Santarém District in Portugal. The population in 2011 was 7,702, in an area of 95.36 km^{2}.

The present Mayor is Mário Fernando Pereira and the President of the Municipal Assembly is Mario Santiago. The municipal holiday is April 2.

== Geography ==
=== Physical geography ===
Alpiarça is situated on a plateau in the landscape of the Vale do Tejo-Lezíria. The main town of Alpiarça is located at approximately 20–25 metres (66–82 ft) above the Tagus Valley, some 3 kilometres (1.9 mi) from the left bank. The morphology of the terrain is marked by plain profile, sparsely covered by vegetation, and intensely proportioned by its proximity to Tagus, alternating with pasturelands.

=== Human geography ===
The municipality of Alpiarça includes only one civil parish, and is limited in the northeast and east by the municipality of Chamusca, southeast and southwest by the municipality of Almeirim and northwest by the municipality of Santarém.

==== International relations ====
Alpiarça municipality is twinned with:

- Wysokie Mazowieckie, Poland
- Champigny-sur-Marne, France

== Architecture ==
- Archaeological site of Quinta da Goucha (Portuguese: Povoado da Quinta da Goucha/Estação arqueológica da Quinta da Goucha/do Cabeço da Bruxa)
- Archaeological site of Quinta dos Patudos (Portuguese: Castelo de Alpiarça/Estações arqueológicas da Quinta dos Patudos)
- Estate of Quinta dos Patudos (Portuguese: Quinta dos Patudos)
- Finances Building of Alpiarça (Portuguese: Edifício das Finanças de Alpiarça)
- Manorhouse of Quinta de São José (Portuguese: Casa da Quinta de São José)
- Residence-Museum of Patudos/Residence of José Relvas (Portuguese: Casa-Museu dos Patudos/Casa de José Relvas)
- Theatre of Alpiarça (Portuguese: Cine-Teatro de Alpiarça)

=== Religious ===
- Church of Santo Estáquio (Portuguese: Igreja Paroquial de Alpiarça/Igreja de Santo Eustáquio)

== Notable people ==
- José Relvas (1858 – 1929 in Alpiarça) a Portuguese politician and 70th Prime Minister of Portugal.
- Abel Fontoura da Costa (1869–1940) a Portuguese colonial administrator, a military officer, a politician and a scientist; governor of Cape Verde, 1915-1918
- Carlos Montez Melancia (1927 in Alpiarça – 2022) the Governor of Macau, 1987 to 1991
