= Chouto (Chamusca) =

- Civil parish
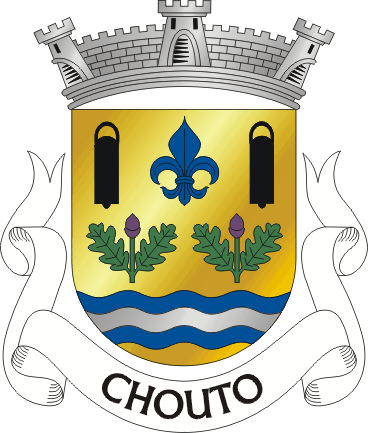
- Coat of arms

- Location in Portugal
- Coordinates: 39°16′N 8°21′W
- Country: Portugal
- Region: Oeste e Vale do Tejo
- Intermunic. comm.: Lezíria do Tejo
- District: Santarém
- Municipality: Chamusca
- Disbanded: 2013

Area
  - Total: 205.3 km^{2} (79.3 sq mi)

Population (2001)
  - Total: 715
  - Density: 3.48/km^{2} (9.02/sq mi)
- Time zone: UTC+00:00 (WET)
  - Summer (DST): UTC+01:00 (WEST)

Chouto is a former civil parish in the municipality of Chamusca, Portugal. In 2013, the parish merged into the new parish Parreira e Chouto. It covers an area of 205.3 km^{2} and had a population of 715 as of 2001.
