= Archaeological site of Quinta dos Patudos =

- Castle of Alpiarça
- Interactive map of Archaeological site of Quinta dos Patudos
- Type: Archaeological site
- Location: Santarém, Lezíria do Tejo, Centro, Portugal

Site notes
- Owner: Portuguese Republic
- Public access: Public Estrada Nacional E.N.118, in the direction of Almeirim-Alpiarça, on lands that pertain to the Quinta dos Patudos, on either side of the road

The Archaeological site of Quinta dos Patudos (Portuguese: Estação arquelógica da Quinta dos Patudos) is an archaeological site in the civil parish of Alpiarça, in the municipality of the same name in the Portuguese district of Santarém (part of the former historical province of Ribatejo). Sometimes referred to as the "castle" of Alpiarça, it is part of an archeological station within the Quinta dos Patudos, that includes the Castle of Alpiarça, Cabeço da Bruxinha, Necropolis of Tanchoal and the Necropolis of Meijão.

== History ==
It is likely that the construction of the original settlement began between the 5th and 4th century B.C., resulting from a castro, or fortified settlement. The sites proximity to other necropoli suggest that it was important to the Celts, who left vestiges of their ritual cremation in other sites. Sometime around the 4th century B.C. this castro culture disappeared, likely pressured by distinct influences in the region: the opening of communication/transport lines from the littoral to interior; pressures from Mediterranean cultures (in particular the Romans); and/or the cultural evolution of the Celtic peoples, from Meseta.

The zone continued to be used during the Roman occupation; a few of the Tanchoal urns date from this period. Alpiarça is important for the notable necropoli, protohistoric and Roman settlements; the presence of various Roman milestones consecrated to Emperor Trajan (Caesra Nerva Traianus Augustus), from 53-117 B.C. suggest a vital link to Mérida (Augusta Emerita).

The site had been recognized since the beginning of the 20th century, but no surveys were undertaken, this due to the institutionalization of Portuguese anthropology. In comparison to the Spanish, English or Germans, Portuguese archeologists were not active in exhuming the archaeological record, and except for some, such as the anthropologist, archaeologist and professor, António Augusto Esteves Mendes Corrêa (University of Porto) rarely ventured into the field.

Systematic archaeological excavations, therefore, only began on the site in 1973, under the direction of Gustavo Marques and Gil Miguéis de Andrade, with many of the objects discovered transferred to the Museum of Casa dos Patudos. The German Archaeological Institute carried out further investigations in 1979 in the area of Cabeço da Bruxa and Alto do Castelo, under the direction of Philine Kalb and Martin Hoeck. Material discovered during this investigation (primarily several urns) were also left in the possession of the museum authorities.

== Architecture ==
The site is situated on a plateau, situated between agricultural lands south of the village of Alpiarça, crossing the national motorway. To the east of the castle is a plateau some 32 metres (105 ft) above sea level that dominates the region, flanked in the north by the necropole of Tanchoal and south by the necropole of Meijão, both delimited by the Ribeira do Forno and Ribeira da Atela, respectively. To the west of the national motorway is the Cabeço da Bruxinha, a hilltop separated by a depression, some 15 metres (49 ft) from the castle of Alpiarça.

The castle of Alpiarça corresponds to large castro, approximately 1,150 metres (3,770 ft), encircled by a large wall of stone and sand, covered by vegetation, with zones of discontinuity to the southeast, that may refer to the former entryways to the site. The most elevated point is an open area, situated at different levels, that could be representative of other walled enclosures, long since disappeared, that formed an acropolis. The Cabeço da Bruxinha, situated on the opposite hilltop, seems to be artificially distanced from the plateau where the castle is situated. On the north and south flanks are two necropoli.

The first significant discovery was recounted by Mendes Correia at the Necropolis of Tanchoal: an incinerated funerary deposit, consisting of 17 urns full of ash and coal, buried to a depth of 1–1.2 metres (3.3–3.9 ft). Around the site the archeologists discovered an axe and bronze bracelet (biberons), a caliciforme vase and a decorated bowl. Cleaning of the ceramic artefacts revealed ornate designs, that would later be referred to as "cerâmica de engobe brunido do tipo Alpiarça" (Alpiarça-type glazed ceramics) by archeologists. Many of the artefacts discovered at the site were placed on display at the Museum of Casa dos Patudos and the Anthropological Museum of the University of Porto.
