= Chamusca e Pinheiro Grande =

- Civil parish

- Location in Portugal
- Coordinates: 39.37°N 8.46°W
- Country: Portugal
- Region: Oeste e Vale do Tejo
- Intermunic. comm.: Lezíria do Tejo
- District: Santarém
- Municipality: Chamusca

Area
  - Total: 67.10 km^{2} (25.91 sq mi)

Population (2011)
  - Total: 4,299
  - Density: 64.07/km^{2} (165.9/sq mi)
- Time zone: UTC+00:00 (WET)
  - Summer (DST): UTC+01:00 (WEST)

Chamusca e Pinheiro Grande is a civil parish in the municipality of Chamusca, Portugal. It was formed in 2013 by the merger of the former parishes Chamusca and Pinheiro Grande. The population in 2011 was 4,299, in an area of 67.10 km^{2} (25.91 sq mi).
