= Parreira e Chouto =

- Civil parish
- Location in Portugal
- Coordinates: 39.23°N 8.36°W
- Country: Portugal
- Region: Oeste e Vale do Tejo
- Intermunic. comm.: Lezíria do Tejo
- District: Santarém
- Municipality: Chamusca

Area
  - Total: 338.41 km^{2} (130.66 sq mi)

Population (2011)
  - Total: 1,492
  - Density: 4.409/km^{2} (11.42/sq mi)
- Time zone: UTC+00:00 (WET)
  - Summer (DST): UTC+01:00 (WEST)

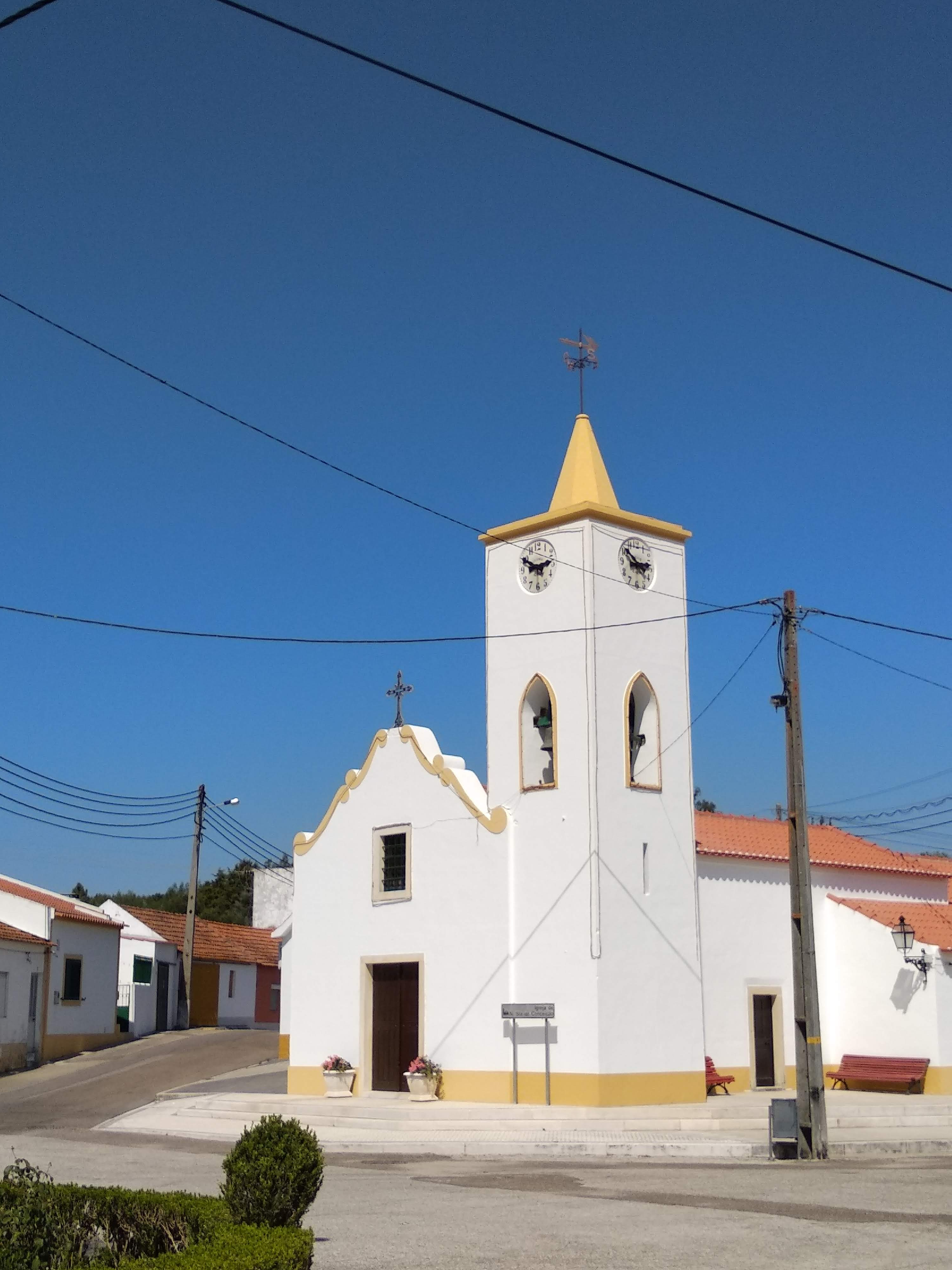
Chouto Igreja Nossa Senhora Conceição

Parreira e Chouto is a civil parish in the municipality of Chamusca, Portugal. It was formed in 2013 by the merger of the former parishes Parreira and Chouto. The population in 2011 was 1,492, in an area of 338.41 km².
