= Chouto =

Chouto may refer to:

- Chouto (Chamusca), a civil parish in municipality of Chamusca, Portugal
- Lampros Choutos, a Greek footballer
