= Quarteto 1111 =

Portuguese rock band

Quarteto 1111 was a Portuguese progressive rock and psychedelic rock band founded in Estoril in 1967. Originally it was formed by Miguel Artur da Silveira (drums), José Cid (vocals and keyboard), António Moniz Pereira (guitar) and Jorge Moniz Pereira (bass). Later members included Tozé Brito, Mike Sergeant and Mário Rui Terra. It was one of the most influential rock bands in the country.

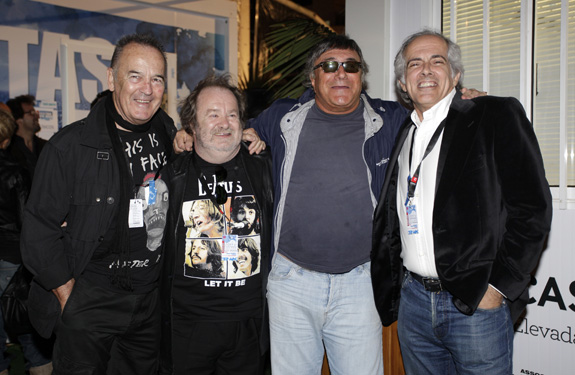
Quarteto 1111 in 2011

It was one of the many musical groups inspired by The Shadows. Originally called Conjunto Mistério (lit. "mystery group"), the name later changed to Quarteto 1111 ("1111 quartet"). The name was inspired by the phone number of the band's rehearsal place, at the drummer's house.

José Cid was the band leader, composer, keyboard player and lead singer. The rest of the band had a classic formation influenced by the usual Beatles line-up, but with a sound and song structure reminiscent of the early Moody Blues.

== History ==
Quarteto 1111 was the first symphonic rock band in Portugal.

Since 1968-69 they got media attention through a hit single, "El Rei D. Sebastião", actually with lyrics about the theme of the lost Portuguese king, who supposedly died in the fields of Morocco during the battle of Alcácer-Quibir (a loss that would eventually lead to Portugal losing its independence to Spain). All the myths related with the return of King Sebastian — a quite anchored Portuguese myth — were fairly treated in this song. The harpsichord made its first appearance in Portuguese rock music. A single with the English version of the song was published in Great Britain.

The following works continued in the same vein, combining melodic songs with newly progressive instruments, namely the Mellotron.

Later on the band evolved to a pop sound, with José Cid and Tozé Brito pursuing solo careers. At the same time the pop oriented parallel project "Green Windows" also occupied Cid and some of the band members.

The band (with Michel, Tozé Brito and Mike Seargeant) briefly reunited on 24 November 2007, during a José Cid show, where the rest of the band joined him onstage and played four songs from their work.

== Discography ==
=== EPs ===
- 1967 - A Lenda de El-Rei D.Sebastião
- 1967 - Balada para D. Inês
- 1968 - Dona Vitória
- 1970 - Domingo Em Bidonville

=== Singles ===
- 1968 - Meu Irmão / Ababilah
- 1969 - Nas Terras do Fim do Mundo
- 1969 - Génese / Os Monstros Sagrados
- 1970 - Todo o Mundo e Ninguém / É Tempo de Pensar em Termos de Futuro
- 1970 - Back to the Country / Everybody Needs Love, Peace and Food
- 1971 - Ode to the Beatles / 1111
- 1972 - Sabor a Povo / Uma Nova Maneira de Encarar o Mundo
- 1976 - Lisboa À Noite / Canção do Mar
- 1977 - O Que Custar
- 1987 - Memo / Os Rios Nasceram Nossos

=== LPs ===
- 1970 - Quarteto 1111
- 1973 - Bruma Azul do Desejado (com Frei Hermano da Câmara)
- 1974 - Onde, Quando, Como, Porquê, Cantamos Pessoas Vivas - Obra-Ensaio de José Cid

=== Compilations ===
- 1981 - Antologia da Música Popular Portuguesa
- 1993 - A Lenda Do Quarteto 1111
- 1996 - A Lenda De El-Rei D. Sebastião - Colecção Caravela
- 2005 - Singles and EP
- 2014 - Essential
