= Alcanede =

- Civil parish
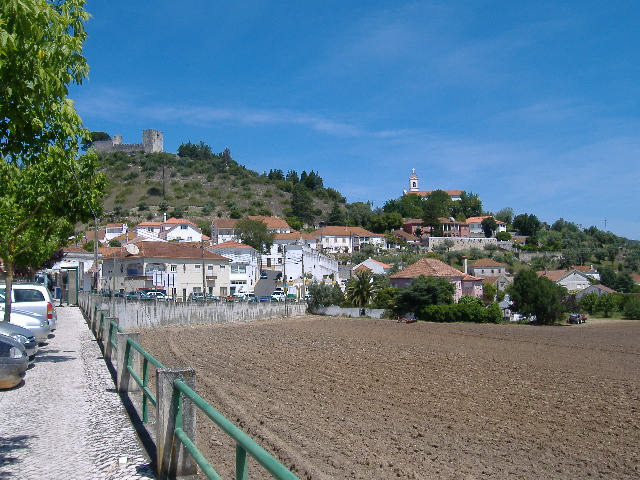
- The village of Alcanede with the Castle of Alcanede on the hilltop in the background

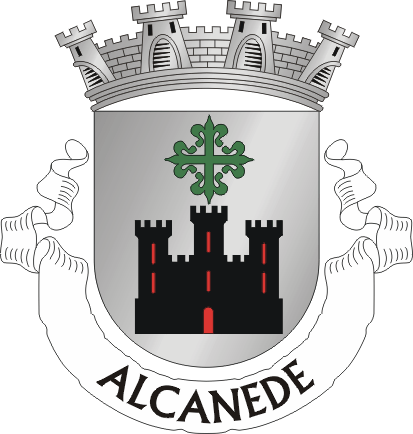
- Coat of arms

- Location in Portugal
- Coordinates: 39.414°N 8.822°W
- Country: Portugal
- Region: Oeste e Vale do Tejo
- Intermunic. comm.: Lezíria do Tejo
- District: Santarém
- Municipality: Santarém

Area
  - Total: 105.84 km^{2} (40.87 sq mi)
- Elevation: 93 m (305 ft)

Population (2011)
  - Total: 4,547
  - Density: 42.96/km^{2} (111.3/sq mi)
- Time zone: UTC+00:00 (WET)
  - Summer (DST): UTC+01:00 (WEST)
- Postal code: 2025
- Area code: 243
- Patron: Nossa Senhora da Purificação

Alcanede is a civil parish in the municipality of Santarém, Portugal, in the district of the same name, of the Ribatejo. The population in 2011 was 4,547, in an area of 105.84 km^{2}. Between 1163 and 1855 it was a municipal seat (with a population of 6408 inhabitants in 1801).

== History ==
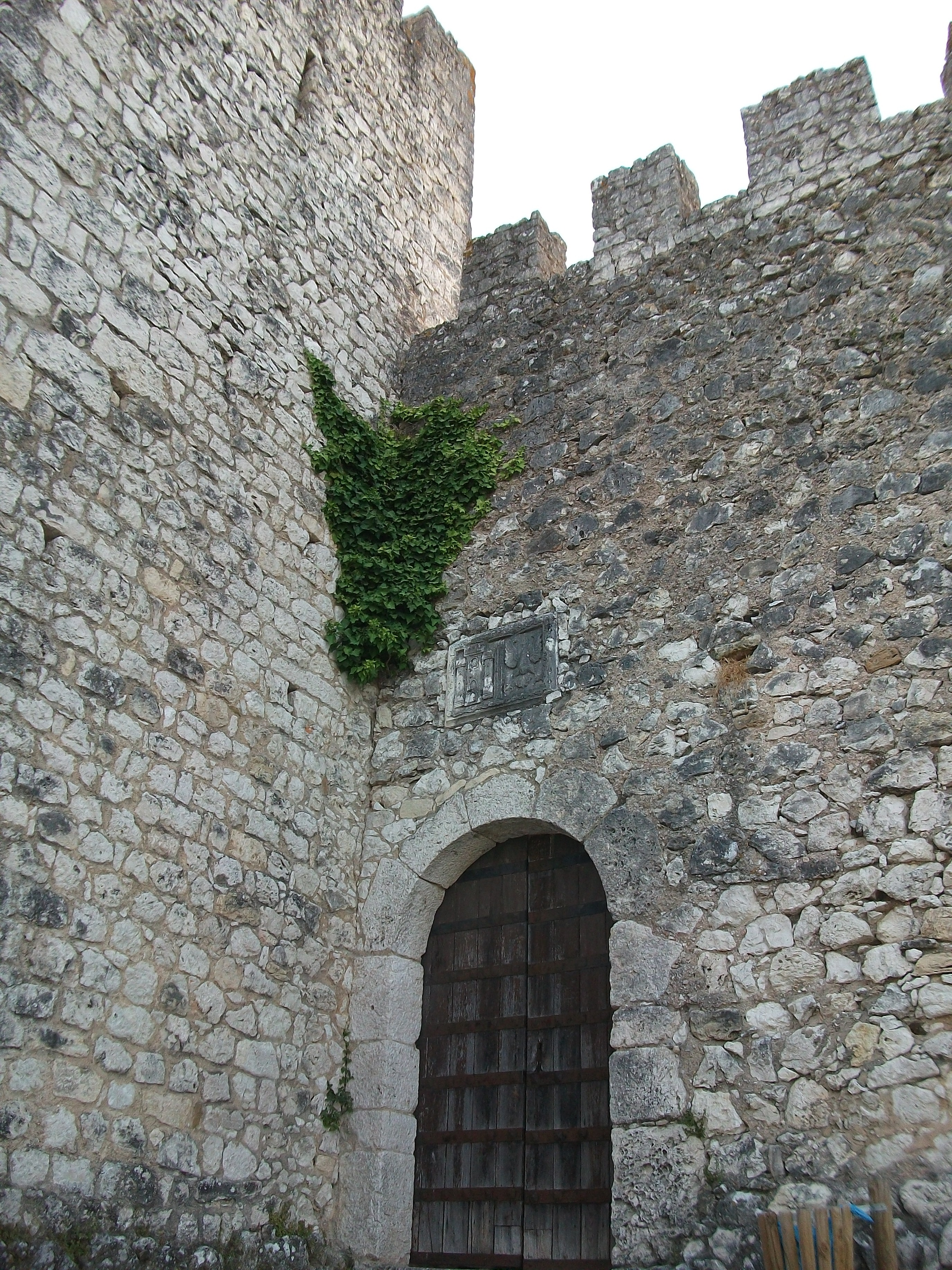
Entrance to the Castle of Alcanede

Between 1163 and 1855, with a population around 6408 (1801), it was the municipal seat of a municipality consisting of Louriceira, Malhou, Alcobertas, Fráguas, Abrã, Alcanede and Arneiro das Milhariças.

During the Roman occupation, the region of Alcanede constituted the western limit of the Santarém colonia; it was a secondary Roman transit roadway.

Afonso Henriques donated the village of Alcanede to Gonçalo Mendes de Sousa, while the ecclesiastical rights were transferred to the Monastery of Coimbra, in 1163, resulting in the construction of a religious temple that records referred to as Santa Maria de Alcanede. The first prior was Father Fernão Anes (1299).

In 1179, the castle's garrison assisted Fuas Roupinho to defeat Moorish incursions and attacks on the Castle of Porto de Mós, and in 1187 King Sancho I donated the castle in Alcanede to the militia in Évora (the future Order of Aviz).

King Ferdinand had the castle remodelled in 1370, at the same time while the men of Alcanede participated in the public works in the Castle of Santarém. In 1372, Vasco Fernandes de Camões (descendant of Luís de Camões) was appointed the Alcaide-mor of the Castle of Alcanede, just as the garrison allied itself with the Master of Aviz (per the chronicler Fernão Lopes).

In 1514, King Manuel provided a regal charter (Portuguese: foral). During the accession crisis, the municipality supported Philip II of Spain, yet for a while, António, Prior of Crato, sought refuge in Alcanede, on his escape from the country. In July 1679, Father António Vieira stayed in Alcanede, as revealed from his correspondence with diplomat Duarte Ribeiro de Macedo.

On 16 July 1719, the local population revolted against taxes imposed by the Order of Aviz, going as far as marching to Lisbon and receiving a favourable hearing from King John V.

During the third French invasion, between November 1810 and March 1811, the main village is occupied and pillaged by French troops from Massena's 8th Corp.

After the 1820 Liberal revolution, the Municipal Chamber of Alcanede aligned itself with the new regime. During the 1846 Patuleia, Alcanede and its region were sites of many confrontations between Cartistas and Septembrist forces.

== Geography ==
Alcanede is a parish of the district and municipality of Santarém, situated 26 kilometres from the regional capital. It is bordered by its former parishes: Gançaria, Abrã, Abitureiras and Tremês. The parish contains the localities Aldeia de Além, Aldeia da Ribeira, Alqueidão do Mato, Alqueidão do Rei, Bairro dos Murtais, Barreirinhas, Casais da Charneca, Casal de Além, Covão dos Porcos, Espinheira, Mata do Rei, Mosteiros, Murteira, Prado, Pé da Pedreira, Vale da Trave, Vale do Carro, Vale do Soupo, Valverde, Viegas and Xartinho.

== Economy ==
The agricultural community, in addition to being supported by domestication of herd species, is involved in meat processing, along with the extraction of limestone, forestry and saw-milling, construction, bread-making and small commercial businesses.

== Architecture ==
=== Civic ===
- Roman Bridge/Medieval
- Dinosaur footprints

=== Military ===
- Castle of Alcanede - dating to the Roman epoch, it was situated on an ancient castro, which was expanded and renovated during the high Middle Ages. Conquered from the Moors by Afonso Henriques in 1091 during his campaigns in Santarém and Lisbon, the castle was commanded by Gonçalo Mendes de Sousa, who renovated and reconstructed the walled citadel, in addition to settling and organizing the village. During the reign of Dinis the village and castle passed into the hands of the Order of Aviz, resulting in new remodelling, with the construction of the keep. The loss of its military importance, directly affected the village's importance; the monarchy considered the reconstruction of ruined castle (affected by the 1755 earthquake) as a possible solution to the region's problems (which the Order of Aviz supported). By 1926, the fort was in an advance stage of ruin; in 1941, the DGEMN - Direcção Geral dos Edifícios e Monumentos Nacionais (Portuguese: General Directorate of Buildings and National Monuments) initiated public works to reconstruct the aged structure, which lasted nine years, and involved reconstruction of many of the walls, towers and interior spaces.

=== Religious ===
- Church of Senhora da Conceição (Portuguese: Lady of Conception) - the Matriz Church, originally the Church of Santa Maria de Alcanede, it was constructed in 1163 by Gonçalo de Sousa, and consists of a church with one nave, wooden roof, along with arched main and lateral chapels that were elaborated in the late part of the 17th century during extensive renovations that included azulejo tiling of the pulpit. Similar tiles were completed in the 18th century, followed by exterior walls around 1874, and extensive interior remodelling. A Manualine-style baptistery located alongside the church was completed during the first half of the 16th century, and includes a simple baptismal fountain accessed through a Manueline archway.
- Chapel of Misericórdia
