= Alpiarça Municipal Chamber =

Legislative body of Alpiarça

Coordinates: 39.26458°N 8.57915°W

Alpiarça Municipal Chamber Câmara Municipal de Alpiarça
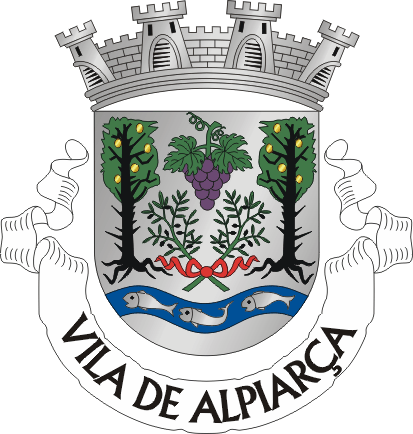
- Coat of arms of the town of Alpiarça

Type
- Type: Câmara municipal
- Term limits: 3

History
- Founded: 2 April 1914; 111 years ago

Leadership
- President: Sónia Cruz Mendes, PS since 20 October 2021
- Vice President: Jorge Manuel Claudino de Freitas, PS since 20 October 2021

Structure
- Seats: 5
- Political groups: Municipal Executive (3) PS (3) Opposition (2) CDU (2)
- Length of term: Four years

Elections
- Last election: 26 September 2021
- Next election: Sometime between 22 September and 14 October 2025

Meeting place
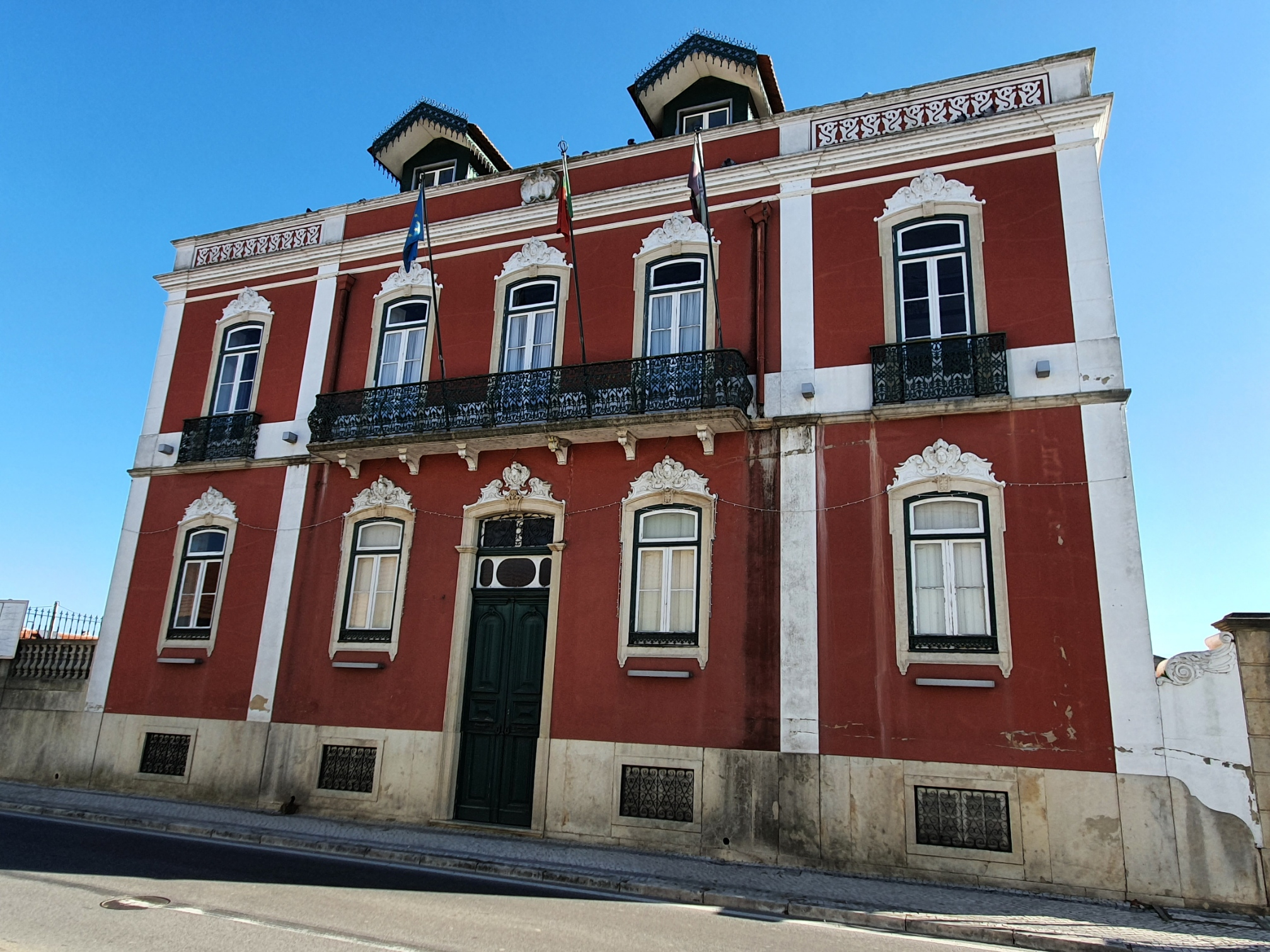
- Paços do Concelho de Alpiarça

Website
- www.cm-alpiarca.pt

The Alpiarça Municipal Chamber (Portuguese: Câmara Municipal de Alpiarça) is the administrative authority in the municipality of Alpiarça. It has 1 freguesia in its area of jurisdiction and is based in the town of Alpiarça, on the Santarém District. This freguesia is: Alpiarça.

The Alpiarça City Council is made up of 5 councillors, representing, currently, two different political forces. The first candidate on the list with the most votes in a municipal election or, in the event of a vacancy, the next candidate on the list, takes office as President of the Municipal Chamber.

== List of the Presidents of the Municipal Chamber of Alpiarça ==
- António Manuel do Amaral de Passos de Sousa Canavarro – (1933–1935)
- Manuel José Coutinho – (1935–1945)
- Raul José das Neves – (1945–1959)
- António Augusto Proença – (1959–1963)
- António Manuel Gonçalves Saldanha – (1963–1971)
- José João Lúcio Avelino – (1971–1974)
- Carlos Augusto Pinhão Correia – (1974–1975)
- Joaquim Alcobia Matias – (1975–1979)
- Olímpio Francisco Oliveira – (1979–1982)
- Armindo Gaspar Pinhão – (1982–1993)
- Raul Arranzeiro Figueiredo – (1993–1997)
- Joaquim Luís Rosa do Céu – (1997–2008)
- Vanda Lopes Nunes – (2008–2009)
- Mário Fernando Pereira – (2009–2021)
- Sónia Cruz Mendes – (2021–2025)

(The list is incomplete)
