= Petrus Castrus =

Portuguese progressive rock band

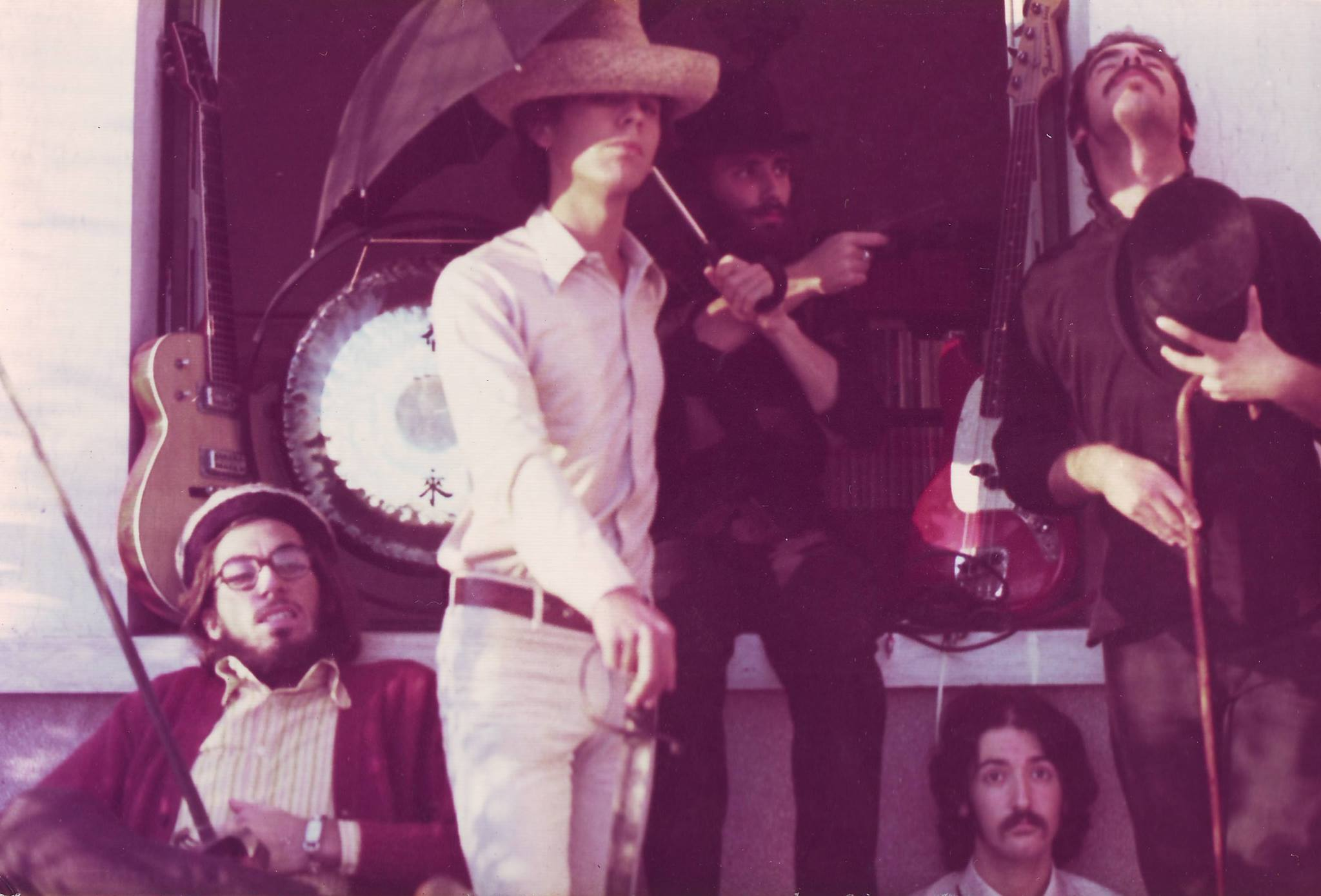

Background information
- Origin: Portugal
- Genres: Art rock Progressive rock Symphonic Prog
- Years active: 1971–1974; 1976–1980; 2008–Present
- Spinoffs: Ferro & Fogo; Plutónicos
- Members: Pedro Castro; José Castro
- Past members: Júlio Pereira (1971-1973); Rui Reis (1971-1974); João Seixas (1971-1974); Miguel Urbano (1976-1980)
- Website: https://www.facebook.com/PetrusCastrus

Petrus Castrus is a Portuguese progressive rock band, formed in 1971 by brothers Pedro Castro and José Castro. Petrus Castrus emerged as one of the first Symphonic Rock bands in Portugal, receiving the status of "Fathers of Portuguese Rock" together with other famous bands.

== Influences ==
In the beginning Petrus Castrus were quite influenced by bands like Pink Floyd, Procol Harum, The Nice and Electric Light Orchestra.

== Members ==
The initial Petrus Castrus contained members:

- Pedro Castro: vocals, guitar and bass
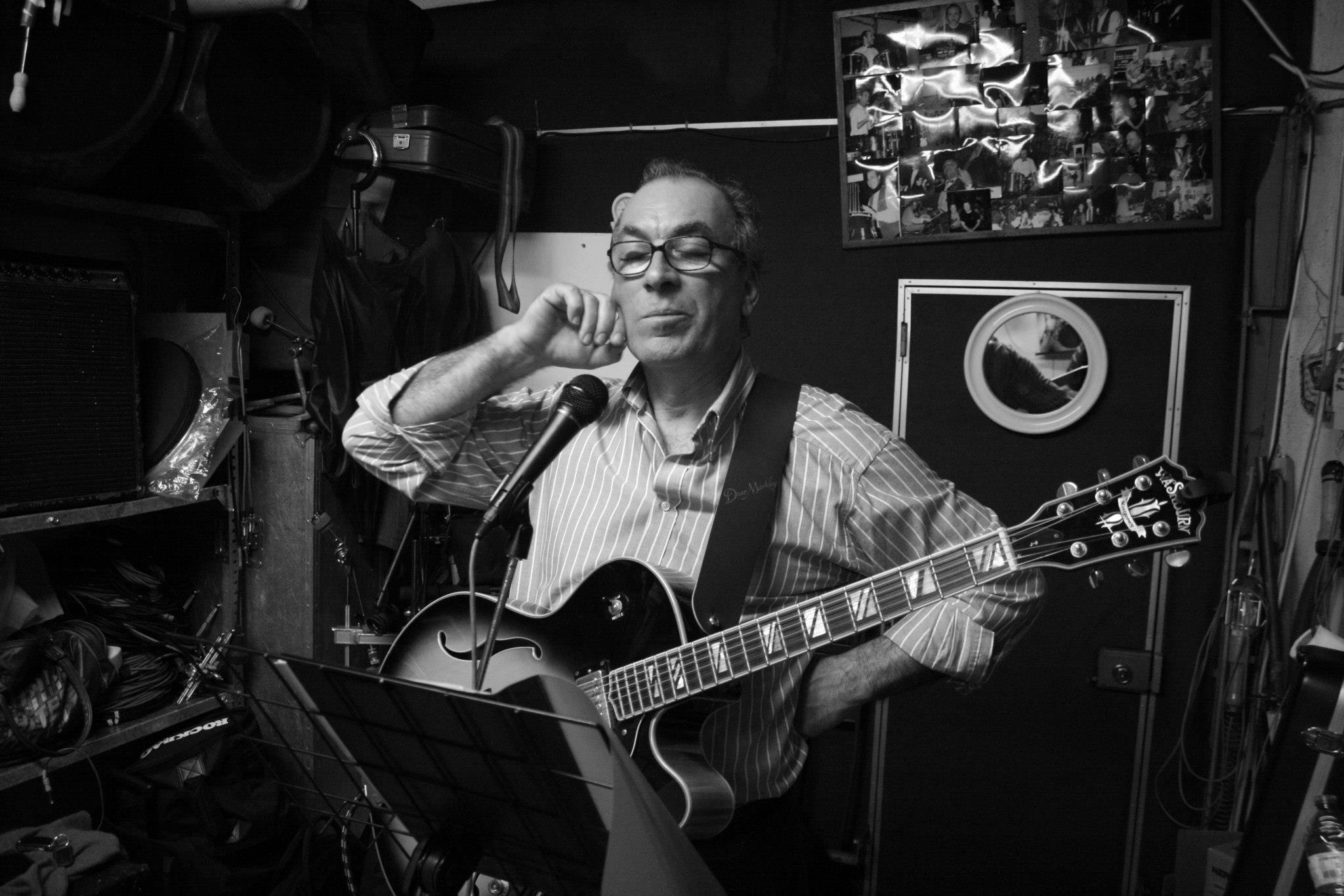
  Petrus Castrus
- José Castro: keyboards, synthesizer and vocals
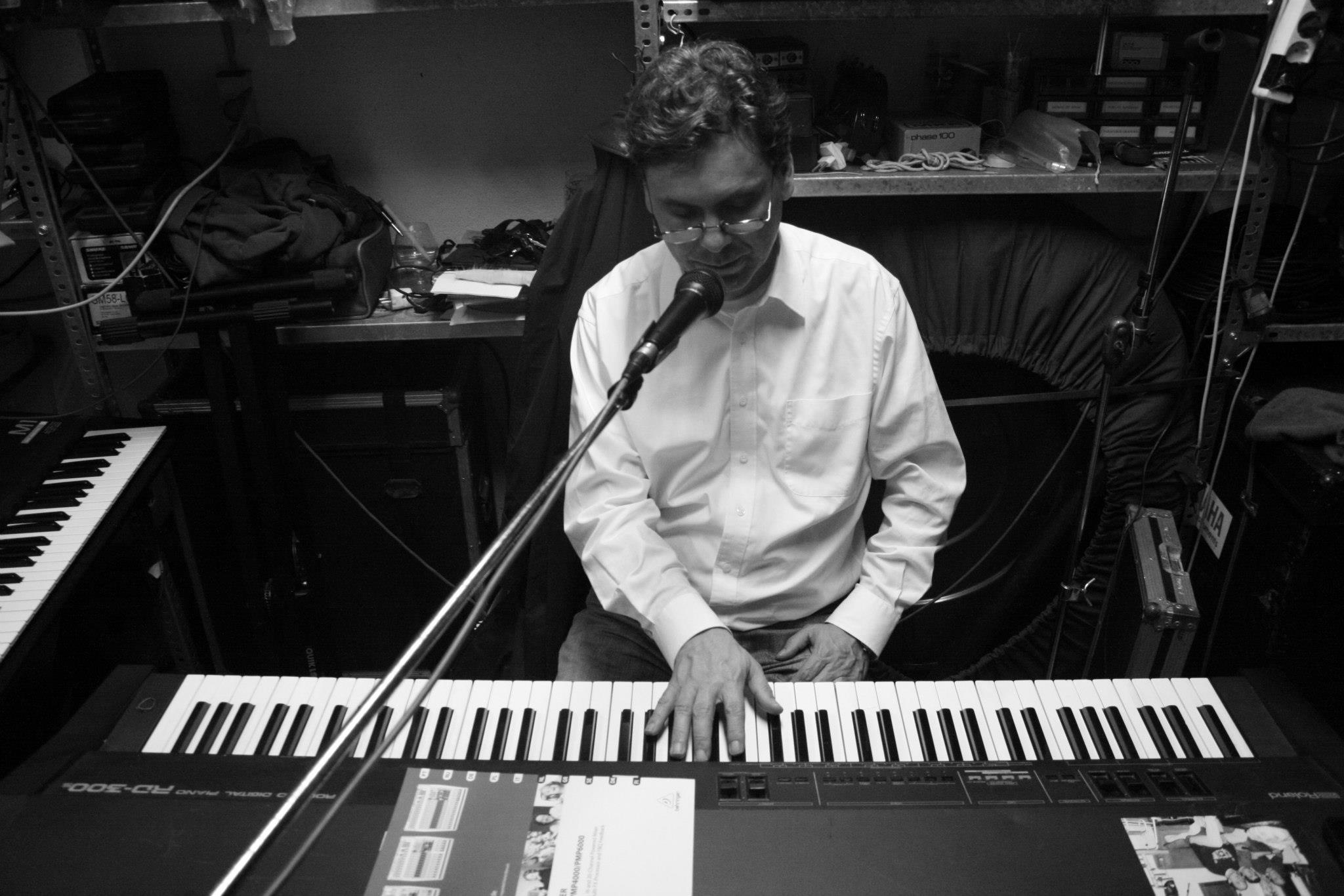
  José Castro no teclado
- Júlio Pereira: guitar
- Rui Reis: organ
- João Seixas: drums

Júlio Pereira left the band shortly after the recording of Mestre. The band suspended activity in 1974 and Rui Reis and João Seixas left to form the band Plutónicos, and later the heavy metal band Ferro & Fogo (Iron & Fire).

In 1976, the Castro brothers returned with a new lineup:

- Pedro Castro: vocals, guitar and bass
- José Castro: keyboards, synthesizer and vocal
- Urbano Oliveira: drums

Two years later, their album Ascenção e Queda was made with contributions from:

- Fernando Girão: guitar
- Rui Serrão: bass
- Lena d'Água: vocals
- Nuno Rodrigues: vocals

== Discography ==
- Marasmo (EP, 1971)
- Tudo Isto, Tudo Mais (All This, Everything More) (EP, 1972)
- Mestre (Master) (LP, 1973; CD, 2007)
- A Bananeira (single, 1974)
- Cândida (single, 1977)
- Ascenção e Queda (Ascent and Fall) (LP, 1978)
- Agente Altamente Secreto (Highly Secret Agent) (single, 1977, was on bonus CD of Mestre)
