= Vale da Trave =

Village in Santarém, Portugal

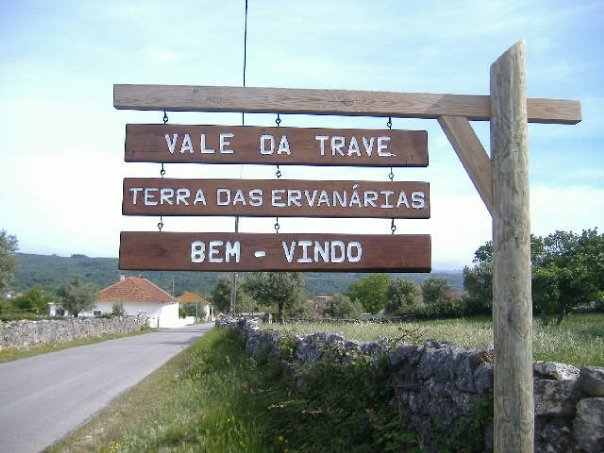

Vale da Trave is a village in the civil parish of Alcanede, municipality of Santarém, Portugal.
