= Raquel Guerra =

Portuguese singer and actress

- Born: 11 November 1985 (age 40); Elvas, Portugal
- Occupations: Actress, Singer
- Years active: 2005–present
- Website: Official website

Raquel Guerra (born 11 November 1985) is a Portuguese singer and actress. She was born in Elvas.

One of the finalists of the Portuguese Idols, along with Luciana Abreu and they both worked in the soap-opera Floribella broadcast on the SIC network. Raquel Guerra played the role of Clara Miranda.

Raquel Guerra also won a musical contest hosted by the TV show SIC 10 Horas.

In 2010 she was part of "Morangos com Açúcar: Vive o teu Verão" (literal translation: "Strawberries with Sugar: Live your Summer") as Lolita. In the same year she took part of the soap opera Feitiço de amor.

She took part of the TV Show from SIC Channel Familia Superstar. She played a role at theatre in 4:48 Psicose by Luísa Ortigoso.

In April 2013 her first single and video will be released with the name "Desencontros" (Marios Gligoris - music; Nuno Valério - lyrics).
