= Mafalda Veiga =

Portuguese singer-songwriter (born 1965)

- Birth name: Ana Mafalda da Veiga Marques dos Santos
- Born: 24 December 1965 (age 59); Lisbon, Portugal
- Genres: Pop folk
- Occupation: Singer-songwriter
- Instrument(s): voice, guitar
- Years active: 1987–present
- Labels: Valentim de Carvalho
- Website: www.mafaldaveiga.com

Mafalda Veiga (born 24 December 1965) is a Portuguese singer-songwriter, born in Lisbon.

== Discography ==
- Pássaros do sul (1987)
- Planície (single, 1987)
- Cantar (1988)
- Nada se repete (1992)
- A cor da fogueira (1996)
- Tatuagem (1999)
- Cada lugar teu (single, 1999)
- Um pouco mais (1999), wrote to Susana Félix
- Mafalda Veiga ao Vivo (live, 2000)
- Na alma e na pele (2003)
- Lado a Lado (2006), duet with João Pedro Pais
- Chão (2008)
- Zoom (2011)
- Grandes êxitos (2013)
- "essencial" (2014)
- Praia (2016)

== Bibliography ==
- Songbook de Mafalda Veiga (Quasi Edições, 2004)
