= 10.000 Anos Depois Entre Vénus e Marte =

10.000 Anos Depois Entre Venus E Marte

Studio album by José Cid
- Released: 15 May 1978
- Recorded: 1977–1978
- Genres: Symphonic rock, progressive rock
- Length: 39:09
- Label: Orfeu
- Producer: José Cid

José Cid chronology
| Vida (Sons do Quotidiano) (1977) | 10.000 Anos Depois Entre Venus E Marte (1978) | Coisas Suas (1979) |

Professional ratings
Review scores
| Source | Rating |
|---|---|
| Hippy | 4.5/5 stars |

10.000 Anos Depois Entre Vénus e Marte (In English: 10,000 Years Later Between Venus and Mars), is a progressive rock album by Portuguese musician José Cid, released on 15 May 1978. It is a spacey rock opera trip into outer space, dominated by Mellotron, string synth, and other synthesizers, with supporting use of guitars, bass, and drums.

== Description ==
Based on the growing science fiction trend, the concept for the album was that, 10.000 years after mankind's self-destruction, a man and a woman travelling in space return to Earth to repopulate it. The tone of the lyrics is of contemplation over mankind's past mistakes and future hopes. Cid's musical style on the record is very similar to the French take on symphonic rock with many string synths, Mellotron and a very simple melodic style. Lyrics are sung in native Portuguese. Most of the songs, influenced by a sort of mix combining The Moody Blues and Pink Floyd psychedelia, were composed by Cid, some of them with the help of guitar player Mike Sergeant and drummer Ramon Galarza.

== Other similar work by José Cid ==
Cid explored symphonic rock with "Onde, Quando, Como, Porquê, Cantamos Pessoas Vivas" (1974), Vida – Sons do Quotidiano (1976) and 10,000 Anos Depois Entre Venus E Marte (1978).

Another project from the album epoch and musicians, Cid's Vozes do Além, explored the "Life after Death / Reincarnation" theme. Featured in the record are a poem by Natália Correia ("Creio") and two from Sophia de Mello Breyner ("Quando" and "Um Dia"). Presently, work on this album has resumed, with the original lineup and the addition of younger musicians.

== Track listing ==
| No. | Title | Length |
|---|---|---|
| 1. | "O Último Dia na Terra" (José Cid) | 4:21 |
| 2. | "O Caos" (Manuel Lamas/Mike Sergeant) | 6:00 |
| 3. | "Fuga para o Espaço" (José Cid) | 8:10 |
| 4. | "Mellotron, o Planeta Fantástico" (José Cid) | 6:43 |
| 5. | "10000 Anos Depois Entre Vénus e Marte" (José Cid/Zé Nabo) | 6:05 |
| 6. | "A Partir do Zero" (Ramon Galarza/José Cid) | 4:43 |
| 7. | "Memos" (José Cid) | 2:07 |

== Personnel ==
- José Cid: piano, synthesizer, string ensemble, Mellotron, Moog synthesizer, Vocals;
- Ramon Galarza: drums
- Zé Nabo: bass guitar, electric guitar, 12 string guitar, classic guitar;
- Mike Sergeant: electric guitar, 12 string guitar (on track 2);
