= José Cid =

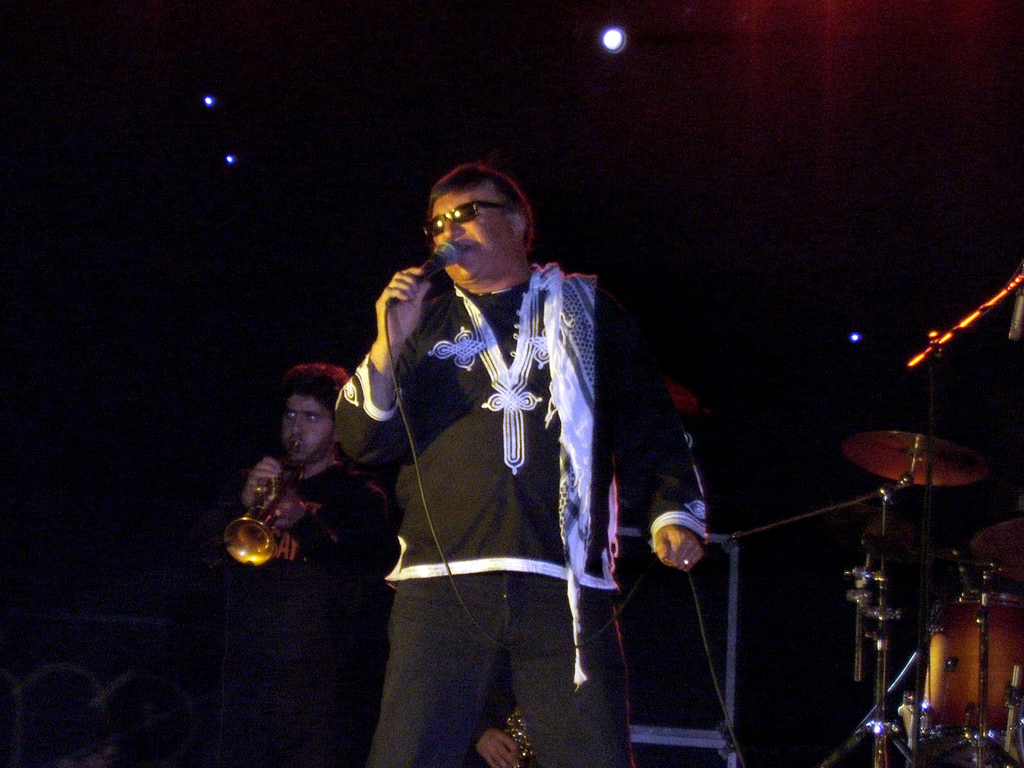

Background information
- Born: José Albano Cid de Ferreira Tavares; 4 February 1942 (age 84); Chamusca, Portugal
- Genres: Pop rock, progressive rock, folk rock
- Occupations: Singer, composer
- Instruments: Vocals, piano, keyboards
- Years active: 1956–present
- Labels: Columbia; Orfeu; PolyGram; BMG; Farol

José Albano Cid de Ferreira Tavares (born 4 February 1942) is a Portuguese singer, composer and record producer. Internationally, Cid is best known for his 1978 progressive rock album 10,000 Anos Depois Entre Vénus e Marte and for representing Portugal at the Eurovision Song Contest 1980 with the song "Um grande, grande amor".

With a career spanning more than 60 years, Cid has been awarded 25 Silver, eight Gold and three Platinum records in Portugal. In 2019, Cid received a Latin Grammy Lifetime Achievement Award, becoming the second Portuguese singer, after Carlos do Carmo, to receive the honour.

== Early life ==
Cid was born in 1942 in Chamusca, son of Francisco Albano Coutinho Ferreira and Fernanda Tavares Salter Cid Ferreira Gameiro. At age 6, he moved with his family to the municipality of Anadia. His professional career began when he started a covers band called Os Babies ("The Babies"), in 1956.

In 1960, Cid began Law School at the University of Coimbra (FDUC). During his time in Coimbra, he created the musical group Conjunto Orfeão with José Niza, Proença de Carvalho and Rui Ressurreição. Cid subsequently joined the bands Trio Los Dos and Os Claves.

In 1965, Cid dropped out of school, without having completed his first year, and left for Lisbon to attend the National Institute of Physical Education (INEF). One of his colleagues at INEF was the brother of Michel, a member of the band Conjunto Mistério. After an audition, he was invited to join the group, later renamed Quarteto 1111.

Cid did not graduate from INEF either, because he was called to serve as an officer in the Portuguese Air Force. At the air base of Ota, he was a gym teacher from 1968 to 1972. His days were spent teaching in the mornings, and rehearsing during the afternoons, playing music in a garage. On the weekends, he performed with Quarteto 1111.

== Quarteto 1111 ==
José Cid co-founded Quarteto 1111, the first band to take a new approach to pop-rock music in Portugal, with a modern line-up and instrumentation.

Quarteto 1111 was the first symphonic rock band in Portugal. Between 1968 and 1969 they received media attention from a hit single, "El Rei D. Sebastião", a song about the loss of the Portuguese king D. Sebastião, who supposedly died in the fields of Morocco during the battle of Alcazarquivir (a loss that would eventually lead to Portugal losing its independence from Spain). All the myths related with the return of King Sebastian – a quite anchored Portuguese myth – were fairly treated in this song. The harpsichord made its first appearance in Portuguese rock music. A single with the English version of the song was released in Great Britain. José Cid was the band leader, composer, keyboard and lead singer. The rest of the band had a classic formation influenced by the usual Beatles line-up, but with a sound and song structure reminiscent of The Moody Blues. The following album continued in the same vein, combining melodic songs with new "progressive" instruments, namely the Mellotron. Later on the band evolved to the late 1970s pop sound.

== Progressive rock ==
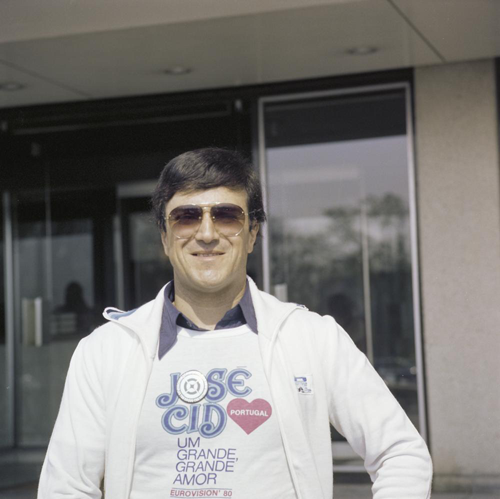
José Cid at a promotion shoot in the Netherlands for the Eurovision Song Contest 1980

Cid explored symphonic rock with Cantamos Pessoas Vivas (1974), Vida – Sons do Quotidiano (1976) and 10,000 Anos Depois Entre Venus E Marte (1978). Most of the songs, influenced by a sort of mix combining The Moody Blues and Pink Floyd psychedelia, were composed by Cid, some of them with the help of guitar player Mike Sergeant and drummer Ramon Galarza. Another (unfinished) project from this lineup, Vozes do Além, explored the "Life after Death / Reincarnation" theme. Featured in the record are a poem by Natália Correia ("Creio") and two from Sophia de Mello Breyner Andresen ("Quando" and "Um Dia"). Presently, work on this album has resumed, with the original lineup and the addition of younger musicians.

== OTI Festival ==
In 1979, José Cid was selected by Radiotelevisão Portuguesa (RTP) to represent Portugal in the eighth edition of the OTI Festival, which was held in Caracas, Venezuela. He competed with the song "Na cabana junto à praia" (In a little house next to the beach), which was well received in the festival to the point that he managed to get the third place with 32 points.

In 1981, one year after his participation in the Eurovision Song Contest, he was again selected by RTP to compete in the tenth edition of the OTI Festival, which was held in Mexico City. This time he was not as successful as in his previous attempt in the Latin-American song contest and he got the tenth place scoring 14 points.

== Eurovision ==
The pop inclinations of José Cid led him to create, during the first half of the 1970s, a 4-piece vocal pop group (Green Windows) and to participate in the 1974 Festival da Canção with Imagens and No Dia Em Que O Rei Fez Anos. He also participated in the Eurovision Song Contest 1980 with the song Um grande, grande amor.

== Present day ==
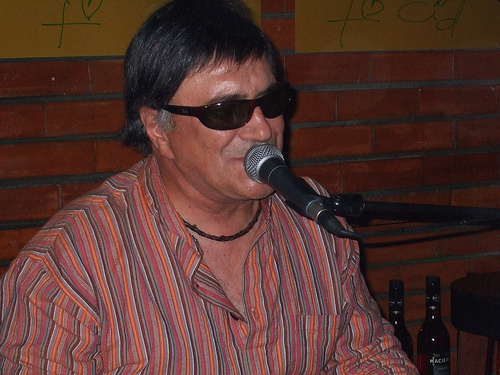
José Cid in 2007.

José Cid himself made a career as a songwriter and singer, and remains a popular and active musician in Portugal.

His latest album "Menino Prodígio", released in 2015, was awarded the Pedro Osório Award for the best album of the year by the Sociedade Portuguesa de Autores (SPA) (English: Portuguese Society of Authors).

In 2016, Cid released his first album in Spain. He received a Latin Grammy Lifetime Achievement Award in 2019.

== Personal life ==
José Cid married Gabriela Carrascalão in 2013. Carrascalão is an East Timorese journalist and artist/painter. Cid and Gabriela live in a farm in Mogofores, municipality of Anadia.

Cid has one daughter, Ana Sofia Infante Pedroso (born 1964) from his first marriage with Emilia Infante Pedroso. Ana Sofia worked briefly with her father, but they are currently estranged.

José Cid is a liberal monarchist and openly and vigorously defends the Portuguese monarchist cause. In 2022, he said:

"I am a monarchist, but I am not a monarchist of this PPM (Monarchist People's Party), mind you. Being a progressive monarchist is simple. It is what Sá Carneiro did not have the courage to assume, although he was married to a Swede, to follow the countries of northern Europe, the least corrupt, the most cultured, the best living countries in the world – and the most boring because they must be full of snow now. We have the best people in the world, the best climate in the world, the best gastronomy in the world, the best shape in the world because we have endured amazing things, from a regicide, two dictatorships, the Salazarist and the Marcelista, and another one very close to a gentleman who won with an absolute majority and who walks around on the loose in Ericeira [reference to Socialist Party's former Prime Minister of Portugal, José Sócrates]."

== Discography ==
=== With Quarteto 1111 ===
Album	Release Date	Format & Tracks
A Lenda de El-Rei D.Sebastião	1967	EP (A Lenda De El-Rei D. Sebastião, Os Faunos, Fantasma «POP», Gente)
Balada para D. Inês	1967	EP (Balada para D. Inês, Partindo-se, Vale da Ilusão, Dragão)
Meu Irmão / Ababilah	1968	Single
Dona Vitória	1968	EP (Guarda Nocturno, Perspectiva, Tempo de Inocência, Dona Vitória)
Nas Terras do Fim do Mundo / Bissaide	1969	Single
Génese / Os Monstros Sagrados	1969	Single
Todo o Mundo e Ninguém / É Tempo de Pensar em Termos de Futuro	1970	Single
Back to the Country / Everybody Needs Love, Peace and Food	1970	Single
Domingo em Bidonville	1970	EP (João Nada, Estrada Para A Minha Aldeia, Domingo Em Bidonville, Epílogo)
Quarteto 1111	1970	LP (Prólogo, João Nada, Domingo em Bidonville, Estrada Para A Minha Aldeia, A Fuga dos Grilos, As Trovas do Vento Que Passa, Pigmentaçäo, Maria Negra, Lenda de Nambuangongo, Escravatura, Epílogo)
Ode to the Beatles / 1111	1971	Single
Sabor a Povo / Uma Nova Maneira de Encarar o Mundo	1972	Single
Bruma Azul do Desejado (with Frei Hermano da Câmara)	1973	LP (Vem Senhor Jesus, Graças Ao Senhor, O Sonho, Hino da Esperança, Bruma Azul do Desejado, Estrela do Mar, Saudai o Senhor, Hino de Natal, Paz na terra, Um Presépio Em Belém)
Onde, Quando, Como, Porquê, Cantamos Pessoas Vivas	1974	LP (Onde, Quando, Como, Porquê, Cantamos Pessoas Vivas (parts 1 & 2)) – progressive rock
Antologia da Música Popular Portuguesa	1981	Compilation (A Lenda de El-Rei D. Sebastião, Os Faunos, Balada para D. Inês, Partindo-se, Dona Vitória, Nas Terras do Fim do Mundo, Meu Irmão, Domingo Em Bidonville, João Nada, As Trovas do Vento Que Passa, Back to The Country, Ode to The Beatles, Uma Nova Maneira de Encarar o Mundo)
Memo / Os Rios Nasceram Nossos	1987	Single
A Lenda Do Quarteto 1111	1993	Compilation (Os Faunos, A Lenda de El-Rei D. Sebastião, Balada para D. Inês, Partindo-se, Dona Vitória, Meu Irmão, Dragão, Os Monstros Sagrados, Génese, Bissaide, Nas Terras do Fim do Mundo, Domingo Em Bidonville, João Nada, As Trovas do Vento Que Passa, Maria Negra, Todo O Mundo E Ninguém, É Tempo de Pensar Em Termos de Futuro, Back to The Country, Ode to The Beatles, Uma Nova Maneira de Encarar o Mundo)
A Lenda De El-Rei D. Sebastião - Colecção Caravela	1996	Compilation (A Lenda de El-Rei D. Sebastião, Meu Irmão, Ode to The Beatles, As Trovas do Vento Que Passa, Domingo Em Bidonville, Balada para D. Inês, Dona Vitória, João Nada, Dragão, Nas Terras do Fim do Mundo, Pigmentação, Fantasma Pop)
Singles e EPs	2005	Compilation (A Lenda De El-Rei D. Sebastião, Os Faunos, Gente, Balada Para D. Inês, Partindo-Se, Dona Vitória, Nas Terras Do Fim Do Mundo, Meu Irmão, Domingo Em Bidonville, João Nada, As Trovas Do Vento Que Passa, Epílogo, Back to the Country, Ode to the Beatles, Uma Nova Maneira De Encarar O Mundo)

=== with Green Windows ===
Album	Release Date	Format & Tracks
Twenty Years/The Story of a Man	1973	Single
Imagens/Doce E Fácil Reino Do Blá, Blá, Blá	1974	Single
No dia em que o rei fez anos	1974	EP ( No Dia Em Que O Rei Fez Anos, Doce E Fácil Reino Do Blá, Blá, Blá, Count James, Bola De Cristal, A Rosa Que Te Dei, Imagens, Another Time To Live, Another Time To Die, Cantiga Portuguesa, Uma Nova Maneira de Encarar O Mundo, Vinte Anos)
Quadras Populares/Ana Karen	1975	Single
Os Grandes Êxitos dos Green Windows	1977	Compilation ( 20 Anos, Rita Rita Limão, Só Eu Sei, Meu Amor, Uma Nova Maneira De Encarar O Mundo, Quem Te Manda Sapateiro, Imagens, Lembranças, No Dia Em Que O Rei Fez Anos, Historia Alegre, Bola De Cristal, O Que Custar, Doce E Fácil, Reino Do Blá, Blá, Blá)

=== Solo work ===
Album	Release Date	Format & Tracks
José Cid	1971	First solo album. Features poems by Jorge Amado and Natália Correia; one theme by Gilberto Gil
Dom Fulano	1971	First solo single
Lisboa Perto e Longe	1972	EP
História Verdadeira de Natal	1972	EP
Camarada	1972	EP. Camarada, Retrospectiva, Viagem, Corpo Abolido
Olá Vampiro Bom	1973	Single
No Dia Em Que O Rei Fez Anos	1974	with Green Windows
A Rosa Que Te Dei	1974	Single
Portugal, É!...	1975	Single
A Festa Do Zé	1975	Single
Ontem, Hoje E Amanhã	1976	Single
Vida (Sons do Quotidiano)	1977	Progressive rock EP
Tia Anita	1977	Single
A Anita Não É Bonita	1977	Single
Romântico Mas Não Trôpego	1977	Single
10,000 Anos Depois Entre Venus E Marte	1978	Progressive rock Album
O Meu Piano/Aqui Fica Uma Canção/O Largo do Coreto/Porquê, Meu Amor, Porquê?	1978	EP
Minha Musica	1978	Single
Porquê	1978	Single
Largo Do Coreto	1978	Single
Aqui Fica Uma Canção	1978	Single
O Meu Piano	1978	Single
Coisas Suas	1979	LP
Verdes Trigais Em Flor	1979	Single
My Music	1980	LP
Um grande, grande amor	1980	EP
Um grande, grande amor	1980	Single
Bem-Me-Quer, Mal-Me-Quer, Muito, Pouco E Nada	1980	Single
Os Grandes Exitos De...	1980	LP
Um Rock Dos Bons Velhos Tempos	1981	Single
Antologia Portuguesa 6	1981	LP
Morrer De Amor Por Ti	1981	Single
Grandes Êxitos Nº 2	1981	LP
Como O Macaco Gosta De Banana	1982	Single
Magia	1982	LP. Se Eu Fizesse Amor Contigo, Desencontro, Magia, Depois Da Meia Noite, Na Manhã Do Meu Viver, Desde Que Me Ames Um Pouco, Uma Lágrima, O Cantor Na T.V., A Não Ser Que, Depois De Ti
Amar Como Jesus Amou	1983	Single
Portuguesa Bonita	1983	Single
Moura Encantada	1984	Single
Noites de Luar	1985	Single
Saudades De Ti	1985	Single
Xi-Coração	1986	Chovia Em Paris, Velho Moinho, Uma Balalaika, Tudo Bem, Tudo Bem, Como Um Condor A Voar, Caminheiro Da Noite De Estrelas, Os Teus Secretos Segredos, Ha
Uma Balalaika	1986	Single
Fado de Sempre	1987	LP
Uh! Au! Lobo Mau	1987	Single
Cai Neve Em Nova York	1988	Single
José Cid	1989	LP
O Melhor de	1990	LP
De Par Em Par	1991	LP
Camões, As Descobertas... E Nós	1992	LP
Vendedor de Sonhos	1994	LP
O Melhor Dos Melhores- Vol. 34	1994	LP
Pelos Direitos do Homem	1996	Dedicated to the East Timor independence.
Nunca Mais É Sexta Feira !...	1996	LP
A Rosa Que Te Dei (Collection: Caravela)	1996	LP
Ode a Federico Garcia Lorca	1998	LP
Cais Sodré	1999	Jazz album recorded in one take in April 1999
Entre Margens	1999	LP
Clássicos Da Renascença - Vol. 52	2000	LP
José Cid / Adelaide Ferreira (Collection: O Melhor De 2)	2001	LP
De Surpresa	2002	Duet album featuring songs with Paulo de Carvalho, Quinta do Bill, Vitorino and Waldemar Bastos
Antologia - Nasci p'ra música	2003	LP
Best	2003	LP
A Arte e a Música	2004	"Best of" album, double platinum
Baladas da minha vida	2006	Double platinum. Tracks: Na Cabana Junto à Praia, A Lenda de El-Rei D. Sebastião, 20 anos, O Melhor Tempo da Minha Vida (Original), Ontem, Hoje e Amanhã, A Rosa Que Te Dei, Verdes Trigais em Flor, O Poeta, o Pintor o Músico, Velho Moinho, Nossa Senhora do Tejo (unreleased theme from the Filha do Mar soap opera), Junto à Lareira, Mulher, Café Contigo (Original), Cai Neve em Nova Iorque, Não Tenho Lágrimas, Sonhador, Balada Para D. Inês, S. Salvador do Mundo, Há
Antologia II	2006	
Pop Rock & Vice Versa	2007	Double album released on 21 June 2007. Tracks: CD 1 Como O Macaco Gosta De Bananas, Tôpo De Gama, A Pouco E Pouco (“Favas Com Xóriço!”), Amanhã De Manhã, Deus Inventou O Rock, Portuguese Boys, A Minha Música, Um Grande, Grande Amor, Beatlemania, Strawberry Fields Forever, Ego, Jardim À Beira Mar, O Pintor Não Morreu (duet with Paulo de Carvalho), Magia, Veneno Bom, Bola De Cristal, Doce E Fácil Reino Do Blá, Blá, Blá, Yesterday Today And Tomorrow CD 2: 1. «Topo De Gama», #«No Tempo Em Que O Toninho Lanchava Com Os Amigos Na Pastelaria S.Bento», #«Chovia Em Paris», #«Coração De Papelão», #«Amizade Colorida», #«Uau! Lobo Mau!», #«Como Um Condor A Voar», #«De Surpresa», #«No Teu Refúgio», #«No Meu Piano», #«À Conquista De Cacela», #«Desde Que Me Ames Um Pouco», #«Tenho Este Amor Para Dar», #«Rendez Vous», #«A Não Ser Que», #«Um Rock Dos Bons Velhos Tempos», #«Na Rádio», #«Epitáfio»
Coisas do Amor e do Mar		Album scheduled for release in September 2009
Quem tem medo de baladas?		New original album scheduled for release in 2007 (delayed).
Vozes do Além		Progressive rock album, based in work started in the 70's after 10,000 Anos Depois Entre Venus E Marte, featuring the thematics of reincarnation and life after death. Several song were played live in 2014. Was due to be released in 2016, but was eventually released in 2021.

== See also ==
- Quarteto 1111
- 10,000 Anos Depois Entre Venus E Marte
- Green Windows
- Progressive rock
- Portuguese rock
- Sonho Desfeito (1987 Jorge Ferreira's album on which Cid has worked)

Awards and achievements
Preceded by Paulo de Carvalho with "Amor sem palavras"	Portugal in the OTI Festival; 1979	Succeeded by Simone de Oliveira with "À tua espera"
Preceded by Manuela Bravo with "Sobe, sobe, balão sobe"	Portugal in the Eurovision Song Contest; 1980	Succeeded by Carlos Paião with "Playback"
Preceded by Simone de Oliveira with "À tua espera"	Portugal in the OTI Festival; 1981	Succeeded by Adelaide Ferreira with "Vem no meu sonho"
