= Taxi (Portuguese band) =

Portuguese rock band

Taxi are a Portuguese rock band one of the most influential and biggest of all time in Portugal. The band originated it the 1980s, influenced by ska and the new wave of Police. The band is originally from Porto and was formed in 1979 by João Grande.

Being strongly influenced by the London punk scene they initially composed and sang in English, but this would change after a concert in German School of Porto, when two elements of Polygram discovered them and invited them to record an album, the only condition being that they had to sing in Portuguese. The band released four albums via PolyGram and made other contributions to the Portuguese music scene. To this day, their first hit Chiclete (1981), its still one of the most played tunes on the radio, and one of the icons of the Portuguese '80s music scene.

They have been mostly inactive since 1998, but meet up occasionally for the odd gig.
