= Chamusca =

- Municipality
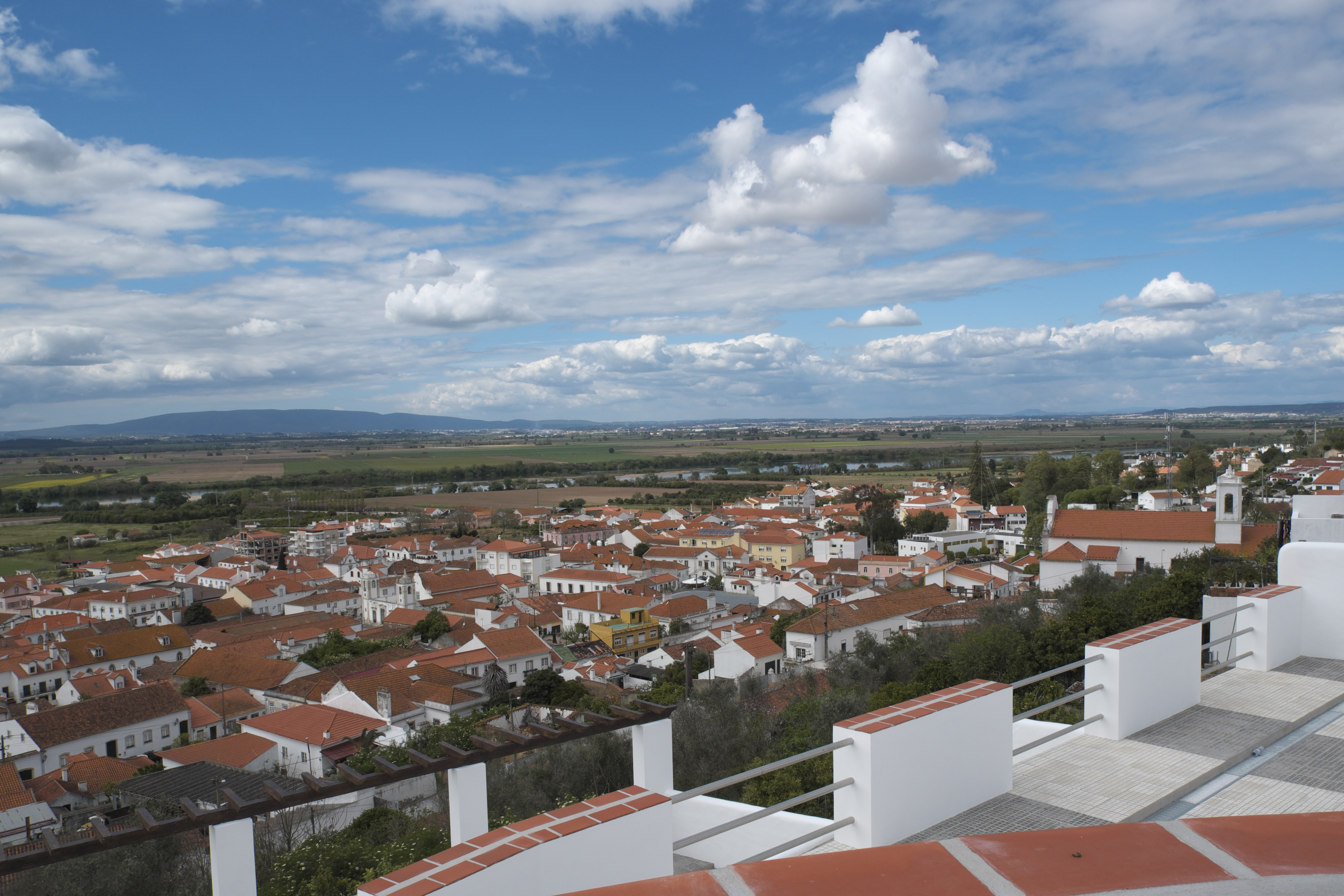
- View of Chamusca

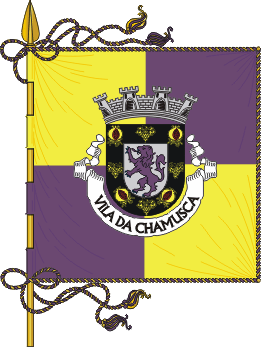
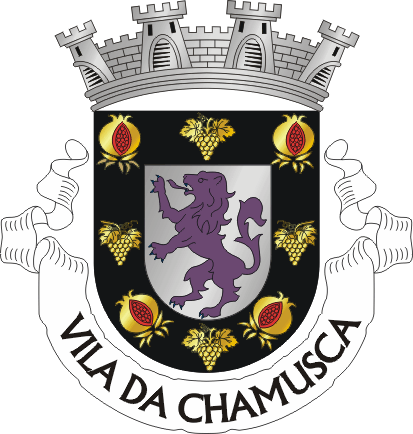
- Flag Coat of arms
- Interactive map of Chamusca
- Location in Portugal
- Coordinates: 39°21′N 8°29′W
- Country: Portugal
- Region: Oeste e Vale do Tejo
- Intermunic. comm.: Lezíria do Tejo
- District: Santarém
- Parishes: 5

Government
  - President: Paulo Queimado (PS)

Area
  - Total: 746.01 km^{2} (288.04 sq mi)

Population (2021)
  - Total: 8,530
  - Density: 11.4/km^{2} (29.6/sq mi)
- Time zone: UTC+00:00 (WET)
  - Summer (DST): UTC+01:00 (WEST)
- Local holiday: 5a Feira de Ascenção (date varies)
- Website: http://www.cm-chamusca.pt

Chamusca (Portuguese pronunciation: [ʃɐˈmuʃkɐ]) is a municipality in Santarém District in Portugal. The population in 2021 was 8,530, in an area of 746.01 km^{2}.

The present Mayor is Paulo Queimado, elected by the Socialist Party. The municipal holiday is Ascension Day.

== Climate ==
Climate data for Chouto, Chamusca, altitude: 126 m (413 ft)
Month	Jan	Feb	Mar	Apr	May	Jun	Jul	Aug	Sep	Oct	Nov	Dec	Year
Average precipitation mm (inches)	112 (4.4)	91 (3.6)	83 (3.3)	70 (2.8)	62 (2.4)	27 (1.1)	8 (0.3)	8 (0.3)	38 (1.5)	82 (3.2)	100 (3.9)	110 (4.3)	791 (31.1)
Source: Portuguese Environment Agency

== Parishes ==
Administratively, the municipality is divided into 5 civil parishes (freguesias):

- Carregueira
- Chamusca e Pinheiro Grande
- Parreira e Chouto
- Ulme
- Vale de Cavalos

== Notable people ==
- Ruy Gómez de Silva, 1st Prince of Éboli (1516 in Chamusca – 1573) a Portuguese noble and adviser to King Philip II of Spain
- José Cid (born 1942 in Chamusca) a Portuguese singer and composer.

== See also ==
- Chamusca IPR
