= Lezíria do Tejo =

- Intermunicipal community
- Logo
- Interactive map of Lezíria do Tejo
- Location in Portugal
- Coordinates: 39.23°N 8.68°W
- Country: Portugal
- Region: Oeste e Vale do Tejo
- Established: 2008
- Seat: Santarém
- Municipalities: 11

Area
  - Total: 4,274.98 km^{2} (1,650.58 sq mi)

Population (2011)
  - Total: 247,453
  - Density: 57.8840/km^{2} (149.919/sq mi)
- Time zone: UTC+00:00 (WET)
  - Summer (DST): UTC+01:00 (WEST)
- Website: www.cimlt.eu

The Comunidade Intermunicipal da Lezíria do Tejo (European Portuguese pronunciation: [lɨˈziɾiɐ ðu ˈtɛʒu]; "Tagus Floodplain") is an administrative division in Portugal. It was established as an Associação de Municípios in 1987, converted into a Comunidade Urbana in 2003, and converted into a Comunidade Intermunicipal in November 2008. It is also a NUTS3 subregion of the Oeste e Vale do Tejo. The seat of the intermunicipal community is the city of Santarém. Lezíria do Tejo comprises municipalities of the former districts of Santarém and Lisbon. The population in 2011 was 247,453, in an area of 4,275 square kilometres (1,651 mi^{2}). In the past, the territory of this administrative division was roughly entirely set in the historic province of Ribatejo and had nothing to do with the historic province of Alentejo. Lezíria is the Portuguese word (from the Arabic الجزيرة, al-jazira, "the island") for floodplain or freshwater marsh. Tejo is the name of the main river in the region. The Lezíria is a well-renowned center of intensive farming, horse breeding and animal husbandry.

== Municipalities ==
It is composed of 11 municipalities:

| Municipality | Population (2011) | Area (km^{2}) |
|---|---|---|
| Almeirim | 23,376 | 222.12 |
| Alpiarça | 7,702 | 95.36 |
| Azambuja | 21,814 | 262.66 |
| Benavente | 29,019 | 521.38 |
| Cartaxo | 24,462 | 158.17 |
| Chamusca | 10,120 | 746.01 |
| Coruche | 19,944 | 1115.72 |
| Golegã | 5,913 | 84.32 |
| Rio Maior | 21,192 | 272.76 |
| Salvaterra de Magos | 22,159 | 243.93 |
| Santarém | 61,752 | 552.54 |
| Total | 247,453 | 4,274.98 |

== See also ==
- Companhia das Lezírias
- Lezíria Bridge
- Ribatejo
