= Night Eternal =

- Cover art by Seth Siro Anton

Studio album by Moonspell
- Released: 16 May 2008
- Recorded: 7 January 2008 – 31 January 2008
- Genre: Gothic metal; melodic death metal; melodic black metal
- Length: 44:14
- Label: Steamhammer
- Producer: Tue Madsen

Moonspell chronology
Under Satanæ (2007)	Night Eternal (2008)	Alpha Noir/Omega White (2012)

Professional ratings
Review scores
Source	Rating
AllMusic	3.5/5 stars
Heavy Rock News	9/10
Home Nucleonics	(favorable)
The Metal Crypt	3.75/5
Metal Rules	4.5/5 stars
Metal Storm	9/10
Room Thirteen	10/13
Sputnikmusic	4/5 stars
Teeth of the Divine	(favorable)
Trash Pit	4/10 stars

Night Eternal is the eighth studio album by Portuguese gothic metal band Moonspell, released on 16 May 2008 in Europe and on 10 June 2008 in North America. It was pre-produced in Portugal with Waldemar Sorychta from 16 to 30 November 2007 and recorded in Denmark at Antfarm studio from 7 to 31 January 2008.

== Track listing ==
No.	Title	Length
1.	"At Tragic Heights"	6:51
2.	"Night Eternal"	4:09
3.	"Shadow Sun"	4:23
4.	"Scorpion Flower" (featuring Anneke van Giersbergen)	4:33
5.	"Moon in Mercury"	4:22
6.	"Hers Is the Twilight"	4:53
7.	"Dreamless (Lucifer and Lilith)"	5:16
8.	"Spring of Rage"	4:04
9.	"First Light"	5:43
Total length:		44:14

=== Limited edition bonus tracks ===
No.	Title	Length
10.	"Age of Mothers"	5:42
11.	"Scorpion Flower (Dark Lush Cut)"	4:36
12.	"Scorpion Flower (The Feeble Cut)"	3:57
Total length:		58:30

=== Limited edition bonus DVD ===
No.	Title	Length
1.	"Finisterra" (live at Wacken Open Air 2007)
2.	"Memento Mori" (live at Wacken Open Air 2007)
3.	"Blood Tells" (live at Wacken Open Air 2007)
4.	"Finisterra" (music video)
5.	"Finisterra" (making-of video)
6.	"Luna" (music video)

== Personnel ==
Moonspell

- Fernando Ribeiro – vocals
- Ricardo Amorim – guitars
- Pedro Paixão – keyboards, samples, guitars
- Miguel Gaspar – drums

Additional musicians

- Niclas Etelävuori – bass
- Patrícia Andrade – choir vocals
- Sophia Vieira – choir vocals
- Carmen Susana Simões – choir vocals

Production

- Adriano Esteves – logo
- Natalie Shau – model
- Jorge Pina – choir recording
- Pedro Paixão – recording
- Waldemar Sorychta – pre-production, arrangements
- Jacob Olsen – additional engineering
- Fernando Ribeiro – executive producer
- Seth Siro Anton – artwork
- Tue Madsen – producer, engineering, mixing, mastering
- Edgar Keats – photography

== Charts ==
Chart (2008)	Peak position
French Albums (SNEP)	144
German Albums (Offizielle Top 100)	62
Portuguese Albums (AFP)	3
