= Alpha Noir/Omega White =

Studio album by Moonspell
- Released: 27 April 2012
- Recorded: 2011
- Genre: Melodic death metal; symphonic metal (Alpha Noir); Gothic metal; gothic rock (Omega White)
- Length: 40:34 (Alpha Noir); 38:10 (Omega White); 78:44 (total)
- Language: English, Portuguese
- Label: Napalm
- Producer: Tue Madsen

Moonspell chronology
Night Eternal (2008)	Alpha Noir/Omega White (2012)	Extinct (2015)

Professional ratings
Review scores
Source	Rating
About.com	3.5/5 stars
Blistering	7.5/10 stars
Exclaim!	favorable
Metal Forces	8/10 stars
Sputnikmusic	3.5/5

Alpha Noir/Omega White is the ninth studio album by Portuguese gothic metal band Moonspell, released on 27 April 2012. It is the band's first double album. The band's press release cited Bathory, King Diamond, Onslaught, early Metallica, Testament and Artillery as influences for Alpha Noir, which was described as "an incendiary album". Omega White was instead described as an album of "pure atmosphere and shadow", an homage to Type O Negative and The Sisters of Mercy and similar to Moonspell's second album Irreligious. Alpha Noir and Omega White were both produced and mixed by Tue Madsen, who had previously worked on the band's Under Satanæ and Night Eternal records.

The song "New Tears Eve" has been dedicated to Peter Steele, the vocalist and leader of Type O Negative, who died in 2010.

== Track listing ==
Alpha Noir
No.	Title	Length
1.	"Axis Mundi"	4:57
2.	"Lickanthrope"	3:49
3.	"Versus"	3:39
4.	"Alpha Noir"	4:30
5.	"Em Nome do Medo" ("In the Name of Fear")	4:27
6.	"Opera Carne"	3:53
7.	"Love Is Blasphemy"	4:31
8.	"Grandstand"	4:54
9.	"Sine Missione"	4:57
Total length:		40:34

Omega White
No.	Title	Length
1.	"Whiteomega"	4:21
2.	"White Skies"	3:34
3.	"Fireseason"	4:29
4.	"New Tears Eve"	4:45
5.	"Herodisiac"	4:46
6.	"Incantatrix"	4:40
7.	"Sacrificial"	4:11
8.	"A Greater Darkness"	7:24
Total length:		38:10

== Personnel ==
- Fernando Ribeiro – vocals
- Ricardo Amorim – guitars
- Aires Pereira – bass
- Pedro Paixão – keyboards, guitars
- Miguel Gaspar – drums

== Charts ==
Chart (2012)	Peak position
Austrian Albums (Ö3 Austria)	44
Belgian Albums (Ultratop Flanders)	87
Belgian Albums (Ultratop Wallonia)	186
Dutch Albums (Album Top 100)	83
Finnish Albums (Suomen virallinen lista)	37
French Albums (SNEP)	108
German Albums (Offizielle Top 100)	37
Swiss Albums (Schweizer Hitparade)	48
