= 1755 (album) =

Studio album by Moonspell
- Released: 3 November 2017
- Recorded: 2017
- Studio: Antfarm Studios (Aarhus, Denmark), Poison Apple Studios (Lisbon, Portugal)
- Genre: Gothic metal; symphonic metal
- Length: 47:42
- Language: Portuguese
- Label: Napalm
- Producer: Tue Madsen

Moonspell chronology
Extinct (2015)	1755 (2017)	Hermitage (2021)

Professional ratings
Review scores
Source	Rating
Blabbermouth.net	7/10 stars

1755 is the eleventh studio album by Portuguese gothic metal band Moonspell, released on 3 November 2017. Unlike previous albums, it is entirely sung in Portuguese. It is a concept album detailing the 1755 Lisbon earthquake.

This album was recorded in Antfarm Studios and Poison Apple Studios, produced and mixed by Tue Madsen, noted for working with Meshuggah, The Haunted, Dark Tranquillity, Dir En Grey, and Die Apokalyptischen Reiter. Cover artwork was designed by João Diogo. It includes guest performances in some songs, including vocals by Paulo Bragança on the track 'In Tremor Dei'.

== Track listing ==
All songs written by Moonspell, all lyrics by Fernando Ribeiro (except "Lanterna dos Afogados").

No.	Title	English translation	Length
1.	"Em Nome do Medo" (Orchestral Version)	In the Name of Fear	5:33
2.	"1755"		5:12
3.	"In Tremor Dei"	In Fear of God	4:26
4.	"Desastre"	Disaster	3:22
5.	"Abanão"	Quake	4:08
6.	"Evento"	Event	4:44
7.	"1 de Novembro"	November 1st	3:53
8.	"Ruínas"	Ruins	4:45
9.	"Todos os Santos"	All Saints	5:09
10.	"Lanterna dos Afogados" (Os Paralamas do Sucesso cover)	Lighthouse for the Drowned	6:30
Total length:			47:42

Digipak and limited edition bonus track
No.	Title	Length
11.	"Desastre (Spanish version)"	3:26
Total length:		51:08

== Personnel ==
- Fernando Ribeiro – vocals
- Ricardo Amorim – guitars
- Aires Pereira – bass
- Pedro Paixão – keyboards
- Miguel Gaspar – drums

=== Additional musicians ===
- Silvia Guerreiro – choir vocals
- Mariangela Demurtas – choir vocals
- Carmen Susana Simões – choir vocals
- Jon Phipps – virtual orchestration
- Martin Lopez – darbuka on "1755"
- Paulo Bragança – vocals on "In Tremor Dei"

=== Production ===
- Adriano Esteves – logo
- Tiago Canadas – engineering, recording
- Jon Phipps – pre-production, arrangements
- João Diogo – artwork
- Tue Madsen – producer, mixing, mastering
- Paulo Mendes – photography

== Charts ==
Chart (2017)	Peak position
Austrian Albums (Ö3 Austria)	63
Belgian Albums (Ultratop Flanders)	89
Belgian Albums (Ultratop Wallonia)	95
French Albums (SNEP)	159
German Albums (Offizielle Top 100)	72
Portuguese Albums (AFP)	11
Swiss Albums (Schweizer Hitparade)	62
US World Albums (Billboard)	14
