= Far from God =

Studio album by Moonspell
- Released: 3 July 2026
- Recorded: December 2025
- Studio: Arda Recorders
- Length: 42:23
- Label: Napalm
- Producer: Jaime Gomez Arellano

Moonspell chronology
Hermitage (2021)	Far from God (2026)

Singles from Far from God
- 1. "Far from God" Released: 25 March 2026; 2. "Cross Your Heart" Released: 27 May 2026; 3. "The Great Wolf in the Sky" Released: 30 June 2026

Far from God is the thirteenth studio album by Portuguese gothic metal band Moonspell. The album was released on 3 July 2026, by Napalm Records.

== Background ==
On 1 June 2024, Fernando Ribeiro announced that Moonspell would not have a new album scheduled for release until 2025 or 2026. They also plan to do several 30th anniversary tours for their first three studio albums, from 2025 to 2028. In October 2025, Ribeiro announced that they would start recording their follow-up to the 2021 album Hermitage in December. By January 2026, he announced that Moonspell had almost completed mixing the album. He stated that the upcoming album would be a "very atmospheric and gothic metal album" and have beautiful songs as well as strong and catchy choruses.

== Release and promotion ==
On 8 March 2026, Moonspell announced that Far from God is the name of the thirteenth studio album, released on 3 July.

On 25 March 2026, Moonspell released the title track "Far From God" as the album's lead single. On 27 May 2026, the band released the second single "Cross Your Heart". On 30 June 2026, they released the third single "The Great Wolf in the Sky", which features Spanish violinist Alicia Nurho.

== Track listing ==
All lyrics are written by Fernando Ribeiro; all music is composed by Pedro Paixão and Ricardo Amorim.

Far from God track listing
No.	Title	Length
1.	"Cross Your Heart"	4:48
2.	"Far from God"	5:06
3.	"Biblical"	5:00
4.	"The Great Wolf in the Sky" (featuring Alicia Nurho)	5:50
5.	"Your Promise of Light"	5:01
6.	"For the Love of Mortals"	5:46
7.	"Our Freedom to Fall"	4:41
8.	"Reconquista"	6:11
Total length:		42:23

== Personnel ==
Credits are adapted from Tidal and Bandcamp.

=== Moonspell ===
- Ricardo Amorim – electric guitar
- Pedro Paixão – keyboards
- Aires Pereira – electric bass guitar
- Fernando Ribeiro – lead vocals
- Hugo Ribeiro – drums

=== Technical ===
- Jaime Gomez Arellano – production, recording, mixing, mastering
- Sonja Schuringa – photos
- Eliran Kantor – cover artwork

== Charts ==
Chart performance for Far from God
Chart (2026)	Peak position
Austrian Albums (Ö3 Austria)	19
Belgian Albums (Ultratop Flanders)	64
Belgian Albums (Ultratop Wallonia)	92
Finnish Physical Albums (Suomen virallinen lista)	7
French Physical Albums (SNEP)	66
French Rock & Metal Albums (SNEP)	22
German Albums (Offizielle Top 100)	27
German Rock & Metal Albums (Offizielle Top 100)	8
Greek Albums (IFPI)	99
Polish Albums (ZPAV)	71
Portuguese Albums (AFP)	3
Swiss Albums (Schweizer Hitparade)	46
UK Album Downloads (Official Charts)	89
UK Independent Albums (Official Charts)	41
