= Hermitage (album) =

Studio album by Moonspell
- Released: 26 February 2021
- Studio: Orgone (United Kingdom)
- Genre: Gothic metal; progressive metal; hard rock
- Length: 52:25
- Label: Napalm
- Producer: Jaime Gomez Arellano

Moonspell chronology
1755 (2017)	Hermitage (2021)	Far from God (2026)

Singles from Hermitage
- 1. "The Greater Good" Released: 19 November 2020; 2. "Common Prayers" Released: 10 December 2020; 3. "All or Nothing" Released: 21 January 2021; 4. "The Hermit Saints" Released: 25 February 2021

Professional ratings
Review scores
Source	Rating
Blabbermouth.net	9/10
New Noise Magazine	5/5 stars

Hermitage is the twelfth studio album by Portuguese gothic metal band Moonspell, released on 26 February 2021. This is their first album without original drummer Miguel "Mike" Gaspar. Drums are performed by new member Hugo Ribeiro (not related to singer Fernando Ribeiro).

This album was recorded in Orgone Studios, UK, produced and mixed by Jaime Gomez Arellano, noted for working with Paradise Lost, Primordial, Ghost, and Sólstafir.

== Track listing ==
All songs written by Pedro Paixão and Ricardo Amorim, all lyrics by Fernando Ribeiro (except "Darkness in Paradise" - Leif Edling).

No.	Title	Length
1.	"The Greater Good"	5:04
2.	"Common Prayers"	4:08
3.	"All or Nothing"	7:22
4.	"Hermitage"	4:44
5.	"Entitlement"	6:16
6.	"Solitarian" (instrumental)	4:07
7.	"The Hermit Saints"	4:22
8.	"Apophthegmata"	5:41
9.	"Without Rule"	7:41
10.	"City Quitter" (Outro)	3:00
Total length:		52:25

Digibook edition bonus tracks
No.	Title	Length
11.	"Darkness in Paradise" (Candlemass cover)	7:10
Total length:		59:35

Limited deluxe 7" Vinyl bonus tracks
No.	Title	Length
11.	"Darkness in Paradise" (Candlemass cover)	7:10
12.	"The Great Leap Forward"	4:50
Total length:		64:25

== Personnel ==
- Fernando Ribeiro – vocals
- Ricardo Amorim – guitars
- Aires Pereira – bass
- Pedro Paixão – keyboards
- Hugo Ribeiro – drums

=== Production ===
- Artūrs Bērziņš – cover art
- Ivo Sotirov – engineering
- Jon Phipps – music consultant
- João Diogo – design
- Jaime Gomez Arellano – producer, mixing, mastering
- Paolo Ramos – vocal coaching
- Rui Vasco – photography

== Charts ==
Chart performance for Hermitage
Chart (2021)	Peak position
Austrian Albums (Ö3 Austria)	33
Belgian Albums (Ultratop Flanders)	49
Belgian Albums (Ultratop Wallonia)	60
German Albums (Offizielle Top 100)	19
Polish Albums (ZPAV)	17
Portuguese Albums (AFP)	1
Swiss Albums (Schweizer Hitparade)	24
