= The Butterfly Effect (Moonspell album) =

Studio album by Moonspell
- Released: 13 September 1999
- Recorded: June 1999
- Studio: Trident Studios, London
- Genre: Gothic metal; industrial metal
- Length: 57:24
- Label: Century Media
- Producer: Andy Reilly

Moonspell chronology
Sin/Pecado (1998)	The Butterfly Effect (1999)	Darkness and Hope (2001)

Professional ratings
Review scores
Source	Rating
AllMusic	link

The Butterfly Effect is the fourth studio album by Portuguese gothic metal band Moonspell. Released in 1999, it was inspired by chaos theory. The album has a more experimental approach than their previous work, incorporating elements of electronic music and industrial metal. The music was composed mainly by keyboardist Pedro Paixão. "Tired" samples Mozart's Requiem.

== Track listing ==
All lyrics are written by Fernando Ribeiro.

No.	Title	Music	Length
1.	"Soulsick"	Pedro Paixão, Sérgio Crestana	4:16
2.	"Butterfly FX"	Paixão, Crestana	3:51
3.	"Can't Bee"	Paixão, Crestana	5:11
4.	"Lustmord"	Paixão, Crestana	3:44
5.	"Selfabuse"	Paixão, Crestana, Ricardo Amorim	4:16
6.	"I Am the Eternal Spectator"	Paixão, Crestana	3:31
7.	"Soulitary Vice"	Paixão, Crestana	3:27
8.	"Disappear Here"	Paixão, Crestana	3:33
9.	"Adaptables"	Paixão, Crestana	3:01
10.	"Angelizer"	Paixão, Crestana	4:30
11.	"Tired"	Paixão, Crestana	5:24
12.	"K" (The song "K" ends at 3:28. Instead of silence, interference beeps can be heard for 2 minutes (3:28 – 5:28). A hidden track entitled "O Mal de Cristo" starts at 5:28.)	Paixão, Crestana	12:40
Total length:			57:24

== Credits ==
=== Band members ===
- Fernando Ribeiro – vocals
- Ricardo Amorim – guitars
- Sérgio Crestana – bass
- Pedro Paixão – synthesizers, samples
- Miguel Gaspar – drums

=== Additional personnel ===
- Oli Albergaria Savill – various misc instruments

=== Production ===
- Paulo Moreira – photography, layout
- Patrick Bird – mastering
- Richard Hinton – engineering assistant
- Andy Reilly – producer, engineering, mastering
- Carsten Drescher – artwork, layout

== Charts ==
Chart (1999)	Peak position
German Albums (Offizielle Top 100)	69

Chart (2020)	Peak position
Portuguese Albums (AFP)	16
