= Wolfheart =

Studio album by Moonspell
- Released: 1 April 1995
- Recorded: 29 January – 13 February 1995 at Studio 2
- Genres: Gothic metal; black metal; folk metal
- Length: 43:52
- Label: Century Media
- Producers: Moonspell, Waldemar Sorychta

Moonspell chronology
Under the Moonspell (1994)	Wolfheart (1995)	Irreligious (1996)

Alternative cover
- Digipak edition

Professional ratings
Review scores
Source	Rating
AllMusic	3/5 stars
Sputnikmusic	(2.5/5)

Wolfheart is the debut studio album by Portuguese gothic metal band Moonspell. All of the tracks are in English except for "Trebaruna" and "Ataegina", which are in Portuguese, as well as the chorus of "Alma Mater". The song "An Erotic Alchemy" is a duet, inspired by and quoting Marquis de Sade.

In July 2010, it was reported that Wolfheart would be represented in the form of an official stamp to be issued by the Portuguese Postal Service (CTT, Correios de Portugal) as part of a collection of stamps that represent the most significant rock moments and records from Portugal.

== Track listing ==
All lyrics by Fernando Ribeiro, all music by Moonspell.

No.	Title	Length
1.	"Wolfshade (A Werewolf Masquerade)"	7:43
2.	"Love Crimes"	7:34
3.	"...Of Dream and Drama (Midnight Ride)"	3:59
4.	"Lua d'Inverno" ("Winter Moon") (Instrumental)	1:48
5.	"Trebaruna"	3:30
6.	"Vampiria"	5:36
7.	"An Erotic Alchemy"	8:05
8.	"Alma Mater"	5:37
9.	"Ataegina" (digipack release bonus track)	4:01
Total length:		47:53

== Credits ==
=== Band members ===
- Fernando Ribeiro (Langsuyar) – lead vocals
- Duarte Picoto (Mantus) – guitars
- João Pereira (Tanngrisnir) – guitars, backing vocals
- João Pedro Escoval (Ares) – bass
- Pedro Paixão (Passionis) – keyboards, backing vocals
- Miguel Gaspar (Mike) – drums

=== Additional musicians ===
- Birgit Zacher – female vocals

=== Production ===
- Nuno Cartaxo – photography
- Christophe Szpajdel – logo (original edition)
- Axel Hermann – cover art (original edition)
- Carsten Drescher – layout, design
