= Memorial (Moonspell album) =

Studio album by Moonspell
- Released: 25 April 2006
- Recorded: November 2005
- Genres: Gothic metal; melodic death metal; melodic black metal
- Length: 52:02, 59:29 (with hidden track)
- Label: SPV/Steamhammer
- Producer: Waldemar Sorychta

Moonspell chronology
The Antidote (2003)	Memorial (2006)	The Great Silver Eye (2007)

Professional ratings
Review scores
Source	Rating
AllMusic	3/5 stars

Memorial is the seventh studio album by Portuguese gothic metal band Moonspell, released on 25 April 2006 by SPV/Steamhammer. The album is available in three versions: a standard edition, a Portugal exclusive with the "Phantom North" bonus track, and a limited digipak edition with the "Atlantic" bonus track.

On 16 January 2007, Memorial was certified gold by the Associação Fonográfica Portuguesa for selling over 10,000 copies in Portugal. This is the first time a Portuguese heavy metal group has received this award.

Each of the limited versions and the standard edition end with a different song, but on every version the final track ends with a six-minute wolves-howling outro ("The Sleep of the Sea"), hence there are actually two official versions of "Best Forgotten".

== Track listing ==
=== CD ===
No.	Title	Length
1.	"In Memoriam" (instrumental)	1:25
2.	"Finisterra"	4:08
3.	"Memento Mori"	4:27
4.	"Sons of Earth" (instrumental)	1:51
5.	"Blood Tells"	4:08
6.	"Upon the Blood of Men"	4:55
7.	"At the Image of Pain"	4:21
8.	"Sanguine"	5:50
9.	"Proliferation" (instrumental)	2:39
10.	"Once It Was Ours!"	4:53
11.	"Mare Nostrum" (instrumental)	1:56
12.	"Luna"	4:42
13.	"Best Forgotten" (includes 1:27 of silence and a 6-minute hidden track, "The Sleep of the Sea")	14:14
Total length:		59:29

=== Special and digipak edition ===
No.	Title	Length
1.	"In Memoriam" (instrumental)	1:25
2.	"Finisterra"	4:08
3.	"Memento Mori"	4:27
4.	"Sons of Earth" (instrumental)	1:51
5.	"Blood Tells"	4:08
6.	"Upon the Blood of Men"	4:55
7.	"At the Image of Pain"	4:21
8.	"Sanguine"	5:50
9.	"Proliferation" (instrumental)	2:39
10.	"Once It Was Ours!"	4:53
11.	"Mare Nostrum" (instrumental)	1:56
12.	"Luna"	4:42
13.	"Best Forgotten"	6:47
14.	"Atlantic" (bonus track; includes 1:27 of silence and a 6-minute hidden track, "The Sleep of the Sea")	12:43
Total length:		64:45

=== Portuguese edition ===
No.	Title	Length
1.	"In Memoriam" (instrumental)	1:25
2.	"Finisterra"	4:08
3.	"Memento Mori"	4:27
4.	"Sons of Earth" (instrumental)	1:51
5.	"Blood Tells"	4:08
6.	"Upon the Blood of Men"	4:55
7.	"At the Image of Pain"	4:21
8.	"Sanguine"	5:50
9.	"Proliferation" (instrumental)	2:39
10.	"Once It Was Ours!"	4:53
11.	"Mare Nostrum" (instrumental)	1:56
12.	"Luna"	4:42
13.	"Best Forgotten"	6:47
14.	"Phantom North" (bonus track; includes 1:27 of silence and a 6-minute hidden track, "The Sleep of the Sea")	11:49
Total length:		65:00

DVD (Special Edition) Live at CC Estudio 2

1. "Memento Mori"
2. "Blood Tells"
3. "Sanguine"
4. "Best Forgotten"

Live at Vilar de Mouros

1. "In Memoriam"
2. "Finisterra"
3. "Memento Mori"
4. "Blood Tells"
5. "Proliferation"
6. "Upon the Blood of Men"

Videos

1. "Luna"
2. "Finisterra"
3. "Making of Finisterra"

=== Vinyl edition ===
Side A
No.	Title	Length
1.	"In Memoriam"	1:25
2.	"Finisterra"	4:08
3.	"Memento Mori"	4:27
Total length:		10:00

Side B
No.	Title	Length
1.	"Sons of Earth"	1:51
2.	"Blood Tells"	4:08
3.	"Upon the Blood of Men"	4:55
4.	"At the Image of Pain"	4:21
Total length:		15:15

Side C
No.	Title	Length
1.	"Sanguine"	5:50
2.	"Proliferation"	2:39
3.	"Once It Was Ours!"	4:53
Total length:		13:22

Side D
No.	Title	Length
1.	"Mare Nostrum"	1:56
2.	"Luna"	4:42
3.	"Best Forgotten"	6:47
4.	"Atlantic (bonus track)"	12:43
Total length:		26:07

== Personnel ==
- Fernando Ribeiro – vocals
- Ricardo Amorim – guitars, keyboards
- Pedro Paixão – keyboards, samples, guitars
- Miguel Gaspar – drums

=== Additional musicians ===
- Waldemar Sorychta – bass
- Raimund Gitsels – violin
- Birgit Zacher – female vocals on "Luna" and "Sanguine"
- Big Boss – vocals on "At the Image of Pain"

=== Production ===
- Wojtek Blasiak – artwork, layout
- Adriano Esteves – cover art, layout
- Dennis Koehne – engineering assistant
- Siggi Bemm – engineering assistant
- Waldemar Sorychta – producer, mixing, engineering
- Paulo Moreira – photography

== Charts ==
Chart (2006)	Peak position
Belgian Albums (Ultratop Flanders)	95
French Albums (SNEP)	181
German Albums (Offizielle Top 100)	68
Portuguese Albums (AFP)	1
