= Under the Moonspell =

EP by Moonspell
- Released: 1994
- Genre: Gothic metal; black metal; folk metal
- Length: 21:26
- Label: Adipocere
- Producer: Quim Monte

Moonspell chronology
Under the Moonspell (1994)	Wolfheart (1995)

Under the Moonspell is the first EP by Portuguese gothic metal band Moonspell, released in 1994 on CD and vinyl.

== Track listing ==
1. "Allah Akbar! La Allah Ella Allah! (Praeludium/Incantatum Solstitium)" – 1:51
2. "Tenebrarum Oratorium (Andamento I/Erudit Compendyum) (Interludium/Incantatum Oequinoctium)" – 7:25
3. "Tenebrarum Oratorium (Andamento II/Erotic Compendyum)" – 6:02
4. "Opus Diabolicum (Andamento III/Instrumental Compendyum)" – 4:22
5. "Chorai Lusitânia! (Epilogus/Incantatam Maresia)" – 1:46

=== Rerelease ===
Under the Moonspell was rerecorded in 2007 along with other early Moonspell songs on the Under Satanæ release. The cover of Under Satanæ is an alternate version of the Under the Moonspell cover.

== Personnel ==
=== Band ===
- Fernando Ribeiro (Langsuyar) (vocals)
- Duarte Picoto (Mantus) (guitar)
- João Pereira (Tanngrisnir) (guitar)
- João Pedro Escoval (Ares/Tetragrammaton) (bass)
- Pedro Paixão (Passionis) (synthesizer)
- Miguel Gaspar (Mike/Nisroth) (drums)

=== Additional performers ===
- Flute – Sara Carreiras
- Violin – Nuno Flores
- Lyric Feminin Voice – Antonieta Lopes
- Moans on "Opus Diabolicum" – Sara Arega
- Arabic vocals on intro – Abdul Sewtea

=== Additional personnel ===
- Christophe Szpajdel — logo
