= Sin/Pecado =

Studio album by Moonspell
- Released: 26 January 1998
- Recorded: 1997
- Studio: Woodhouse Studio, Hagen, Germany
- Genre: Gothic metal, Gothic rock, doom metal
- Length: 61:53
- Label: Century Media
- Producer: Waldemar Sorychta, Moonspell

Moonspell chronology
Irreligious (1996)	Sin/Pecado (1998)	The Butterfly Effect (1999)

Singles from Sin/Pecado
- 1. "Second Skin" Released: 1997

Professional ratings
Review scores
Source	Rating
AllMusic	3/5 stars

Sin/Pecado is the third studio album by Portuguese gothic metal band Moonspell, released in 1998.

== Track listing ==
No.	Title	Length
1.	"Slow Down!"	0:39
2.	"HandMadeGod"	5:33
3.	"2econd Skin"	4:51
4.	"Abysmo"	4:58
5.	"Flesh"	3:04
6.	"Magdalene"	6:15
7.	"V.C. (Gloria Domini)"	4:58
8.	"EuroticA"	3:49
9.	"Mute"	5:57
10.	"Dekadance"	5:49
11.	"Let the Children Cum to Me..."	6:52
12.	"The Hanged Man"	6:26
13.	"13!"	2:42
Total length:		61:53

== Personnel ==
- Fernando Ribeiro – vocals
- Ricardo Amorim – guitars
- Pedro Paixão – synths, samplers, programming
- Miguel Gaspar – drums

Additional personnel

- Sérgio Crestana – bass
- Birgit Zacher – vocals on "Flesh"
- Miriam Carmo – model
- Markus Freiwald – pre-production
- Rolf Brenner – cover art, design, photography
- Siggi Bemm – mixing
- Waldemar Sorychta – producer, mixing
- Carsten Drescher – art director

== Charts ==
Chart (1998)	Peak position
Austrian Albums (Ö3 Austria)	25
Finnish Albums (Suomen virallinen lista)	18
German Albums (Offizielle Top 100)	69
