= Blind Zero =

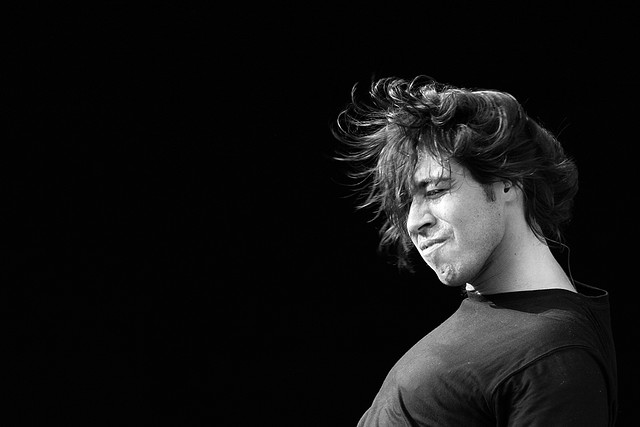
- Blind Zero frontman Miguel Guedes performing (2007)

Background information
- Origin: Porto, Portugal
- Genres: Alternative rock, grunge
- Years active: 1994–present
- Labels: NorteSul; Universal; Red Lemon Music
- Members: Miguel Guedes: vocals Vasco Espinheira: guitar Nuxo Espinheira: bass guitar Pedro Guedes: drums Bruno Macedo: guitar
- Past members: Mário Benvindo: guitar Marco Nunes: guitar Miguel Ferreira: keyboards Pedro Vidal: guitar
- Website: blindzero.net

Blind Zero are a Portuguese rock band from the city of Porto. They won the 2003 MTV Europe Music Award for the Best Portuguese Act.

== History ==
Blind Zero started out 1994 releasing their first EP, Recognize (1995), which sold out in nine days, and is today a collection item. The first album Trigger (1995), was produced by Ronnie Champagne. (Note: L.A. producer who had previously worked with bands such as Jane's Addiction, Alice in Chains, Remy Zero, and Deconstruction) It was the first rock album by a Portuguese band to reach the gold label.

In 1996, Blind Zero revealed a new sound with the Flexogravity EP, a very experimental record with a fusion of sounds, shared with a hip-hop band from Porto, Mind da Gap. Also in 1996, the band recorded an acoustic album, Transradio, one of the first Enhanced CDs (CD Extra) in Europe. The album was recorded live at Antena 3 radio. Months later they were invited to participate in SCYPE (Song Contest for Youth Programs in Europe), a festival gathering bands from all over Europe. They recorded a new original song, "My House", and won the contest.

In 1997, Blind Zero recorded Redcoast, the second album of originals produced by Michael Vail Blum. (Note: American producer who had worked with Suicidal Tendencies, Madonna, Roxy Music, 3T, Tura Satana, Goo Goo Dolls, and Jewel) Redcoast was produced at Sony Music/New York studios by Grammy Award winner Mark Wilder.

In 1998, they recorded with Mário Caldato the song "The Wire", and spent 1999 working on their third album, One Silent Accident, which was released in 2000 and produced by Don Fleming. (Note: Worked with Sonic Youth, Hole, Posies, Screaming Trees, Teenage Fan Club, Gumball, and Alice Cooper)

In 2002, they recorded one of the most famous songs by David Bowie, "Heroes".

In January 2003, they started recording A Way to Bleed your Lover, produced by Mário Barreiros, (Note: Portuguese producer who worked with Silence 4, Ornatos Violeta, and Pedro Abrunhosa) adding a new member to the band, Miguel Ferreira. The album also contained contributions by Jorge Palma and Dana Colley (Twinmen/ex-Morphine). In May 2003, Blind Zero were invited by MTV to perform live in Milan, as part of the initiative of launching MTV Portugal. Later that year they won the "Best Portuguese Act" award at the MTV Europe Music Awards 2003 in Edinburgh, becoming the first Portuguese band to receive an award by MTV. In December, the specialized press considered A Way to Bleed your Lover the best album of the year in Portugal.

In 2005 they released The night before and a new day with Pedro Vidal (ex-Stealing Orchestra) as a member, replacing Marco Nunes on solo guitar.

In 2007 they released Time Machine (memories undone), a best of Blind Zero unplugged album, associated with their 13th anniversary.

In 2010, the album Luna Park was released on 30 May. Three singles were released from it, "Slow Time Love", "Snow Girl" and "The Tallest Building On Earth".

In 2013, Kill Drama was released. Its first single was "I See Desire", which signs the desire of young Portuguese people to work in foreign countries as economic emigrants in the face of Portugal's bad economic situation due to the 2010–2014 Portuguese financial crisis. The album also included the singles "From You", "High and Low", and "I Will Take You Home". To celebrate Blind Zero's 20 years of existence they released Kill Drama II. It contains the same songs as Kill Drama, but all of them featured a different artist.

After Luna Park, Kill Drama and Kill Drama II, three albums with pop vibes, they released in October 2017 Ofteen Trees, an album that is well received and has much more rock 'n' roll than those previous.

== Discography ==
- 1995: Trigger
- 1996: Flexogravity (with Mind Da Gap)
- 1996: Transradio
- 1997: Redcoast
- 2000: One Silent Accident
- 2003: A Way to Bleed Your Lover
- 2004: MTV Live in Milan
- 2005: The Night Before and a New Day
- 2007: Time Machine (memories undone) - live best of unplugged
- 2010: Luna Park
- 2013: Kill Drama I
- 2015: Kill Drama II
- 2017: Often Trees
