= Under Satanæ =

Studio album of re-recorded songs by Moonspell
- Released: 12 October 2007
- Genre: Gothic metal; doom metal; black metal
- Length: 50:32
- Label: SPV/Steamhammer
- Producer: Tue Madsen

Moonspell chronology
The Great Silver Eye (2007)	Under Satanæ (2007)	Night Eternal (2008)

Professional ratings
Review scores
Source	Rating
AllMusic	3.5/5 stars
Sputnikmusic	3.5/5 stars

Under Satanæ is a studio album by Portuguese gothic metal band Moonspell. It contains re-recorded songs of their early material, some of it from their 1994 work Under the Moonspell, and the rest from their demo tapes Anno Satanæ (hence Under + Satanæ) and Serpent Angel from their debut demo (under name Morbid God).

== Track listing ==
1. "Halla alle halla al rabka halla (Praeludium/Incantatum Solistitium)" – 2:18
2. "Tenebrarum Oratorium (Andamento I/Erudit Compendyum)" – 6:23
3. "Interludium/Incantatum Oequinoctum" – 1:33
4. "Tenebrarum Oratorium (Andamento II/Erotic Compendyum)" – 6:15
5. "Opus Diabolicum (Andamento III/Instrumental Compendyum)" – 5:08
6. "Chorai Lusitânia! (Epilogus/Incantatam Maresia)" – 1:50
7. "Goat on Fire" – 6:34
8. "Ancient Winter Goddess" – 6:08
9. "Wolves From the Fog" – 7:03
10. "Serpent Angel" – 7:13

== Personnel ==
- Fernando Ribeiro (Langsuyar) – vocals
- Ricardo Amorim (Morning Blade) – guitars
- Pedro Paixão (Passionis/Neophytus) – keyboards
- Miguel Gaspar (Mike/Nisroth) – drums

Additional personnel

- Aires Pereira (Ahriman) – bass
- João Pereira (Tanngrisnir) – acoustic guitar (track 6, not re-recorded original from Under the Moonspell)
- Christophe Szpajdel – logo

== Charts ==
Chart (2007)	Peak position
Portuguese Albums Chart	12
