= Miguel Guedes =

Portuguese musician

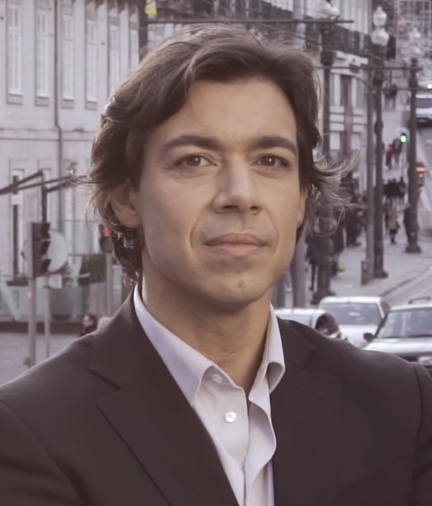
Miguel Guedes

Miguel Guedes (born 10 May 1972) is a Portuguese musician, songwriter, singer, and the lead vocalist of Portuguese band Blind Zero. He is also a lawyer, and has a column where he writes about politics on the Portuguese journal Jornal de Notícias. He is an employee of the GDA - Cooperativa de Gestão dos Direitos dos Artistas Intérpretes ou Executantes, dealing with related rights issues. Miguel Guedes appears on the weekly RTP programme Trio D'Ataque (with Nuno Miguel Gonçalves and others) where he talks about football and expresses his point of view as a lover of football and a supporter of FC Porto. Since February 2023 he has been the chairman of Coliseu do Porto. He votes Bloco de Esquerda and writes for the official party's online publication Esquerda.net. Guedes graduated from the University of Coimbra with a degree in law.
