= Darkness and Hope =

Studio album by Moonspell
- Released: 27 August 2001
- Genre: Gothic metal; gothic rock
- Length: 45:02
- Label: Century Media
- Producer: Hiili Hiilesmaa

Moonspell chronology
The Butterfly Effect (1999)	Darkness and Hope (2001)	The Antidote (2003)

Singles from Darkness and Hope
- 1. "Nocturna" Released: 2001

Professional ratings
Review scores
Source	Rating
AllMusic	3/5 stars

Darkness and Hope is the fifth studio album by Portuguese gothic metal band Moonspell, released in 2001.

Intro Sampler on "Rapaces" is taken from Lifeforce.

Several different versions were released, with different bonus tracks. One version contained "Os Senhores da Guerra", originally by Madredeus, while the second featured "Mr. Crowley", originally by Ozzy Osbourne. Another version had a cover of Joy Division's "Love Will Tear Us Apart" as the bonus track. The limited edition contained all three bonus tracks.

== Artwork ==
The cover of the album features the "Moonspell trident" designed by Polish artist Wojciech Blasiak. The sign, later refined in The Antidote's artwork, became recognizable as a symbol of the band.

== Track listing ==
No.	Title	Length
1.	"Darkness and Hope"	4:46
2.	"Firewalking"	3:05
3.	"Nocturna"	3:52
4.	"Heartshaped Abyss"	4:08
5.	"Devilred"	3:25
6.	"Ghostsong"	4:21
7.	"Rapaces"	5:31
8.	"Made of Storm"	4:09
9.	"How We Became Fire"	5:47
10.	"Than the Serpents in My Arms"	5:58
Total length:		45:02

Limited edition bonus tracks
No.	Title	Length
11.	"Os Senhores da Guerra" (Madredeus cover)	6:30
12.	"Love Will Tear Us Apart" (Joy Division cover)	3:40
13.	"Mr. Crowley" (Ozzy Osbourne cover)	4:30
Total length:		59:42

== Credits ==
=== Band members ===
- Fernando Ribeiro – vocals
- Ricardo Amorim – guitars
- Sérgio Crestana – bass
- Pedro Paixão – keyboards
- Miguel Gaspar – drums

=== Additional personnel ===
- Adolfo Luxúria Canibal – spoken word on "Than the Serpents in My Hands"
- Asta – female vocals on "Devilred"

=== Production ===
- Wojtek Blasiak – artwork
- Paulo Moreira – photography, layout
- Mika Jussila – mastering
- Hiili Hiilesmaa – producer, mixing
- Adriano Esteves – layout

== Charts ==
Chart (2001)	Peak position
Finnish Albums (Suomen virallinen lista)	21
French Albums (SNEP)	99
German Albums (Offizielle Top 100)	43
