= Moonspell =

Portuguese gothic metal band

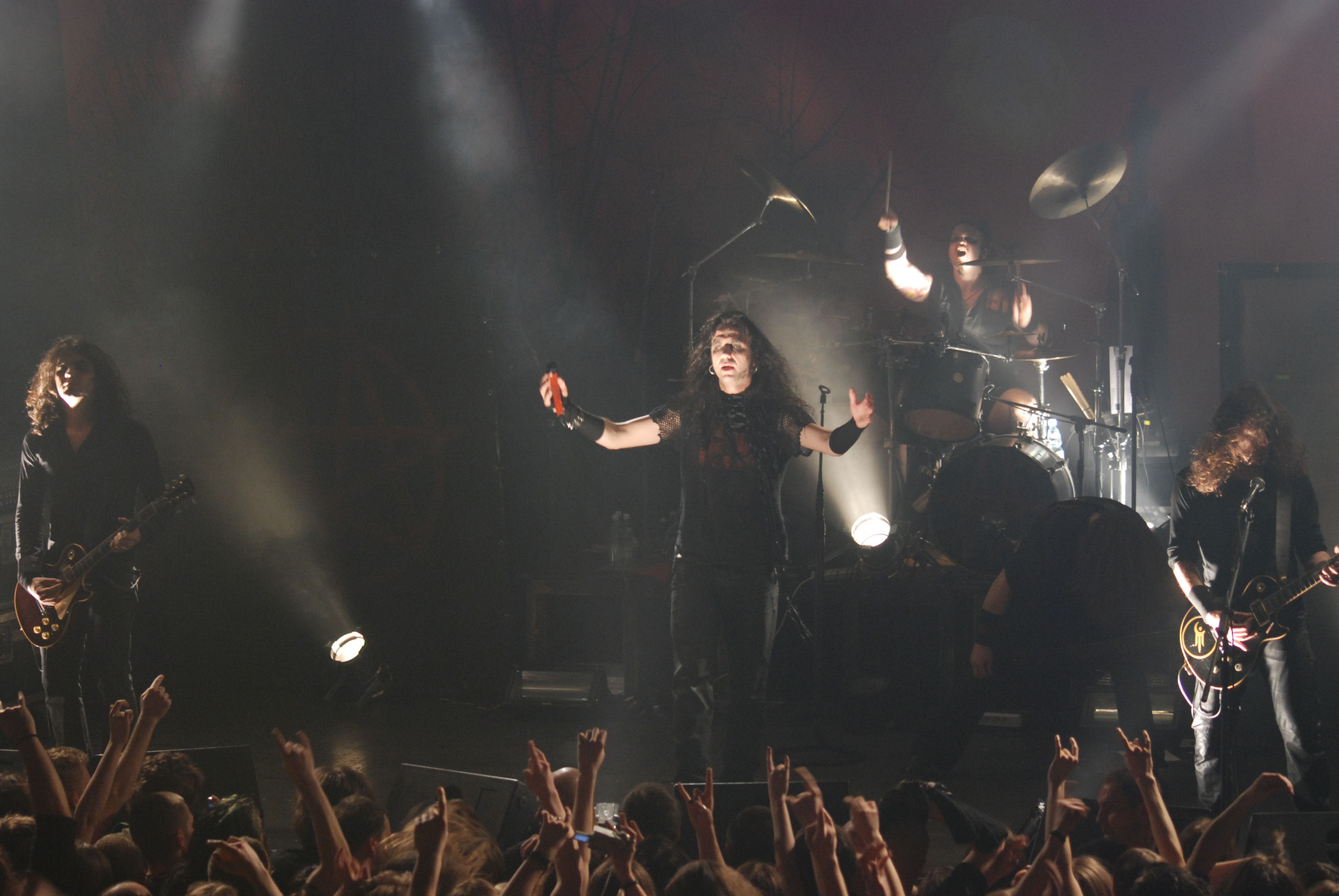
- Moonspell performing in 2007

Background information
- Also known as: Morbid God (1989–1992)
- Origin: Brandoa, Amadora, Portugal
- Genres: Gothic metal; doom metal; melodic death metal; black metal (early)
- Years active: 1989–present
- Labels: Adipocere; Century Media; SPV; Napalm
- Members: Fernando Ribeiro; Pedro Paixão; Ricardo Amorim; Aires Pereira; Hugo Ribeiro
- Past members: Miguel Gaspar; João Pedro Escoval; Duarte Picoto; Luís Lamelas; João Pereira; Sérgio Crestana
- Website: moonspell.com

Moonspell is a Portuguese gothic metal band formed in 1989. The group released their first EP, Under the Moonspell, in 1994, and followed up with their debut album, Wolfheart, a year later. They became the most recognizable Portuguese metal band and a key figure in gothic metal.

Moonspell achieved success in Portugal with their 1998 album Sin/Pecado. With Memorial (2006), the group became the first Portuguese metal band to have a Gold record. They are popular in Germany, where their albums consistently enter the Top 100 Chart.

== History ==
=== Early days (1989–1994) ===
Although they had been playing since 1989 as "Morbid God", the band settled on Moonspell in 1992, shortly after they released the promo track "Serpent Angel". At the time of the name change, the line-up was Fernando Ribeiro (Langsuyar) on vocals, João Pedro "Ares" Escoval (Tetragrammaton) on bass, Duarte Picoto (Mantus) and Luís Lamelas (Malah) on guitars, and Miguel "Mike" Gaspar (Nisroth) on drums. Ribeiro and Ares founded Morbid God / Moonspell, while the latter members joined at different points in 1992. Only Mike Gaspar joined after recording "Serpent Angel".

On 24 February 1993, the band released their demo Anno Satanæ, which contained three songs accompanied by an intro and an outro. In September, Pedro Paixão joined the band to play keyboards. On 6 November 1993, Moonspell performed their first show in Charneca, Lisbon. Shortly after, Lamelas was fired and replaced with João Pereira (Tanngrisnir). The demo attracted the interest of independent label Adipocere Records, which signed the band for a mini-album.

On 27 April 1994, Moonspell released the mini-album Under the Moonspell and toured Portugal to promote it and try to sign to a bigger label. After the mini-album, Moonspell signed with Century Media Records for six albums.

=== Breakthrough (1995–1997) ===
Wolfheart was recorded in Germany with producer Waldemar Sorychta, and was released on 1 April 1995. By June, João Pereira was juggling the band and his daytime job, and was replaced with Ricardo Amorim on 13 June. Amorim had been approached earlier about replacing Pereira on some shows, but nothing had come of it.

In July, Moonspell performed three shows in the United Kingdom, their first outside Portugal, and in September, the band embarked on a European tour supporting Morbid Angel. Duarte Picoto told the band he couldn't go on tour due to personal issues. They went ahead regardless anyway, and played as a five-piece. Amorim, was then the sole live guitarist. The band was reluctant about firing Duarte due to his songwriting, but after the tour, the band felt comfortable as a five-piece and Duarte was let go.

For 1996's Irreligious, the band recorded with producer Waldemar Sorychta. The song "Opium" became the first single. It quoted one of Portuguese poet Fernando Pessoa's heteronyms, Álvaro de Campos, on his poem "Opiário", and its music video featured the character of the poet writing in a bar with the band playing. After the release of the album at Convento do Beato, it sold 10,000 copies in Portugal.

On 7 February 1997, after artistic and personal conflicts, bass player Ares was fired and Sérgio Crestana replaced him. There were several lawsuits between Ares and Moonspell, which were solved in 2004.

=== Experimenting (1998–2000) ===
Sin/Pecado was released in 1998. It was more experimental than its predecessors. The song "2econd Skin" was released as a single. At the time, they released only Dæmonarch album, Hermeticum. Dæmonarch was a side project consisting of all Moonspell members except drummer Mike Gaspar.

Sin/Pecado was followed in 1999 by The Butterfly Effect, recorded in London and produced by Andy Reilly. This album is considered very experimental. Featuring "down-tuned guitar riffs, eerie synthesizer passages", the album was mainly composed by guitarist/keyboard player Pedro Paixão and was not well received by critics.

=== More rock-oriented era (2001–2005) ===
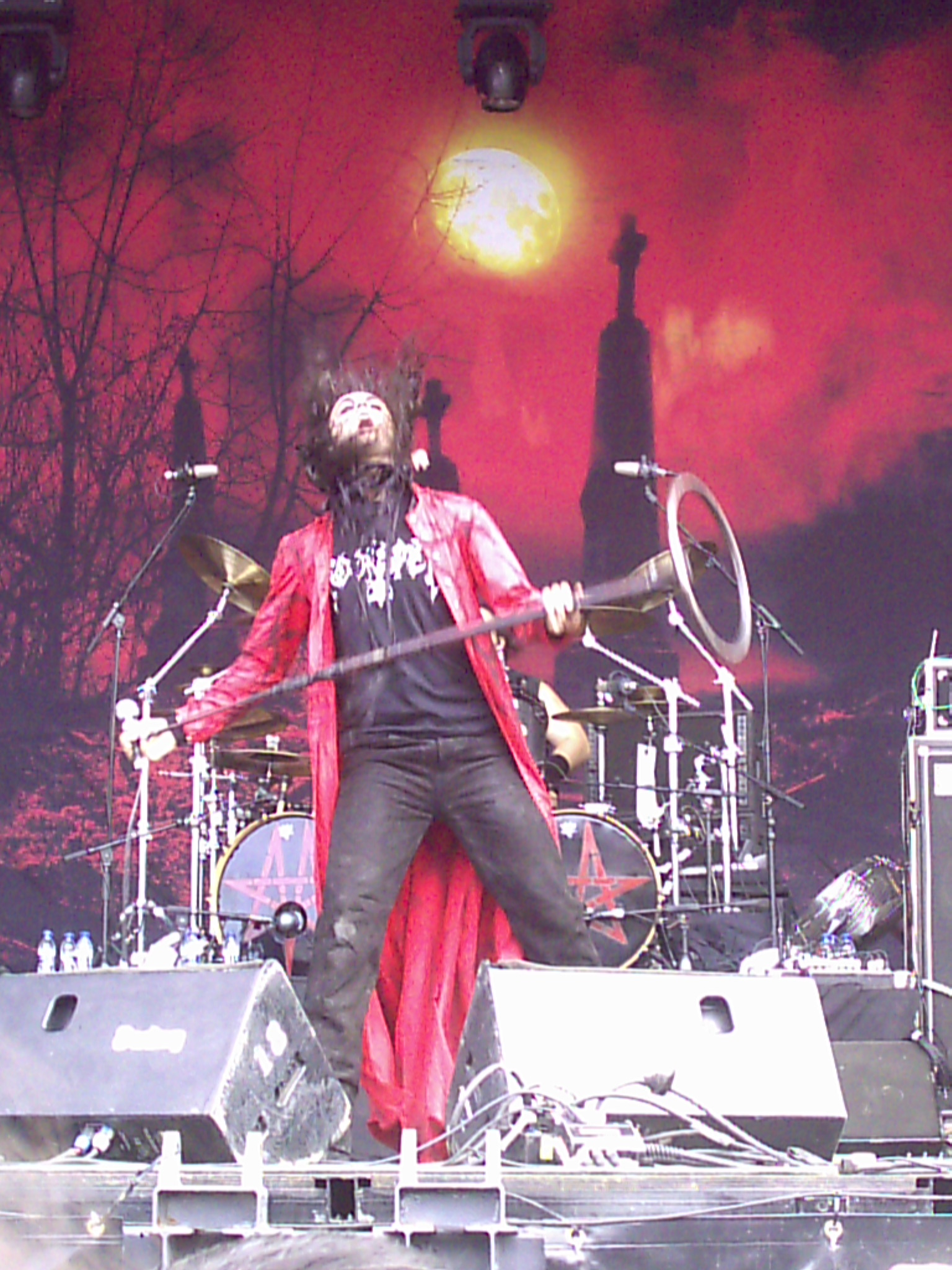
Fernando Ribeiro during a live show in Spain in 2006

Darkness and Hope was released in 2001, produced by Hiili Hiilesmaa, producer of Sentenced and HIM. The album reached 79th on German charts and special editions included covers of Madredeus, Ozzy Osbourne's "Mr. Crowley" and Joy Division's "Love Will Tear Us Apart". "Nocturna" was released as a single and music video.

In 2003, the band released The Antidote, with Niclas Etelävuori from Amorphis as a session bassist, as Sérgio Crestana left the band earlier that year. The album was released with a book with the same title written by Portuguese writer José Luís Peixoto. Both CD and book share a concept, and each song in the CD is sister to a chapter in the book that enhances the story in the lyrics. "Everything Invaded" was released as a single and music video. After the album's recording, Moonspell hired Aires Pereira as a touring bass player. The band toured extensively around the world, playing at Rock in Rio Lisbon in 2004, a concert that brought them to more mainstream attention in Portugal.

During 2003 the band recorded a cover of the jazz standard "I'll See You in My Dreams" for the soundtrack of the Portuguese short zombie horror film of the same name. There is an official music video which was filmed in one day during the production of the short and under a €2,000 budget. The song was also issued as a single in 2004, featuring the full and edited versions.

=== Revisiting their roots (2006–2009) ===
Memorial was released in 2006. Recorded with the producer of their first three albums Waldemar Sorychta, who also recorded the bass guitar parts, it was the first to be released under their new label SPV Steamhammer. The album topped the Portuguese album chart on its first week and also broke into the German Top 100 at number 68. Memorial achieved gold status in Portugal after selling 10,000 copies, making Moonspell the first Portuguese doom metal band to achieve that.

Although the album is heavier than the previous, it was very well received and its release was featured in various Portuguese news broadcasts. A new release of the album was released in December 2006 and featured a DVD with live performances and the music videos made for the album. Music videos for "Finisterra" and "Luna" were released.

The band then worked on releasing a DVD originally entitled Lunar Still/13 Years of Doom, but had some issues of a legal nature and was forced to delay the release, originally expected in September 2005. It was pushed later to 9 December 2008 with a new title: Lusitanian Metal.

On 2 November 2006, Moonspell won an MTV Europe Music Award in the category of Best Portuguese Act.

The Great Silver Eye, a best-of album, was released on 26 June 2007.

In 2007, Moonspell released Under Satanæ, a re-recording of early songs.

Night Eternal was released on 16 May 2008, again with Niclas Etelävuori on bass. The lead single off the album, Scorpion Flower, features Dutch singer Anneke van Giersbergen (ex-The Gathering, now Agua De Annique).

Moonspell performed the "Blackest of the Black" tour with Danzig, Winds of Plague, Dimmu Borgir and Skeletonwitch.

Moonspell toured Europe with Cradle of Filth, Gorgoroth, Septicflesh and Asrai ("The Darkest Tour: Filthfest") in December 2008, and took part in a European tour with Cradle of Filth and Turisas, dubbed the "Darkest Tour: Filthfest 2", in April and May 2009.

In July 2010, it was reported that the Portuguese Postal Service would release "a collection of stamps that represent the most significant rock moments and records from Portugal," which included Moonspell's first album, Wolfheart.

=== New albums (2010–present) ===
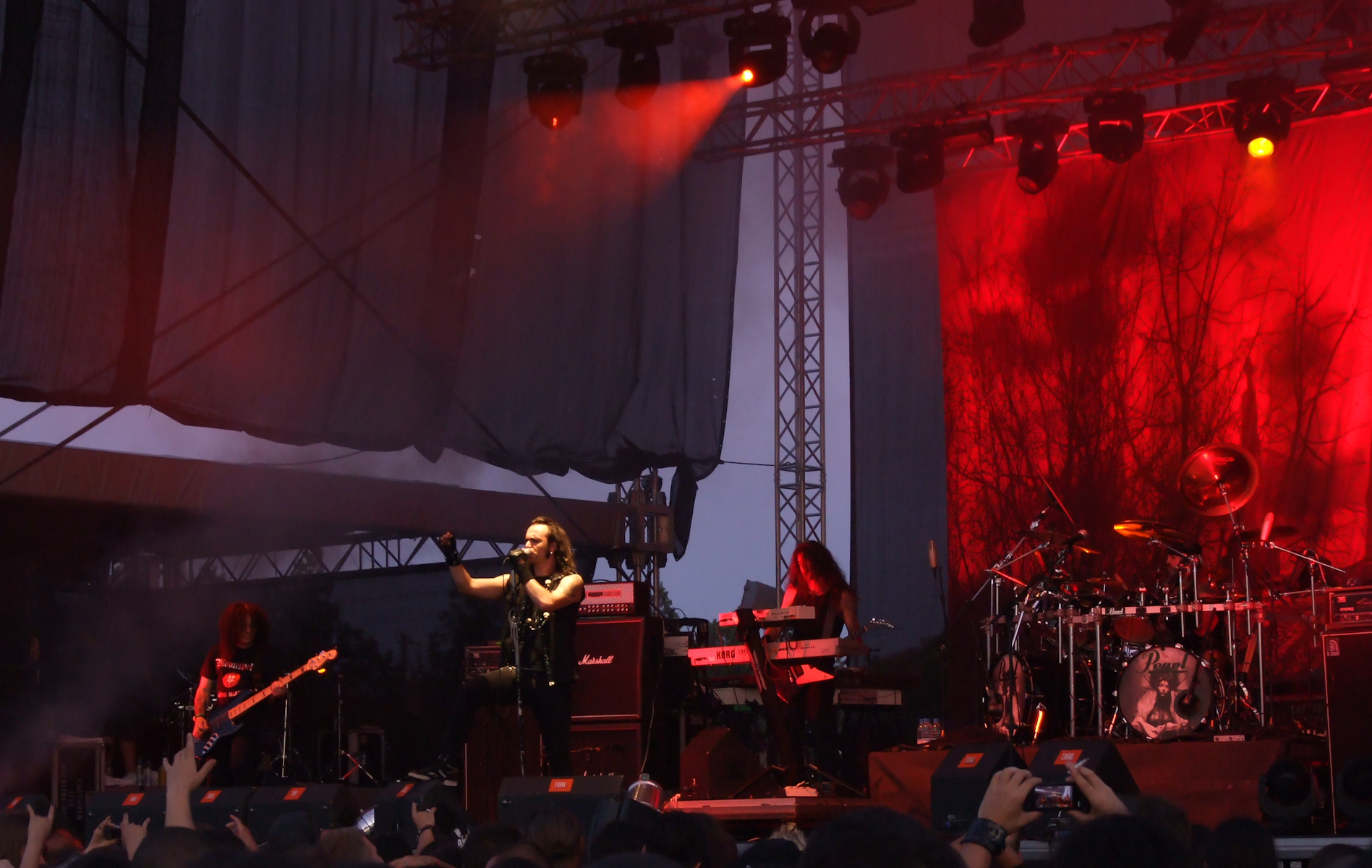
Moonspell at Kavarna Rock Fest 2011

In July 2010, vocalist Fernando Ribeiro revealed the band was working on a new album, which he described as "the most exciting, sexiest, darkest, heaviest and catchiest stuff we've written in ages!". In December 2011 Moonspell signed with Napalm Records, and Ribeiro released the following statement:

"Signing with Napalm is a firm step into cutting all bullshit and work with people who truly believe in us and respect our longevity, while helping us to embrace those who have been arriving in the last years to start with us yet another kingdom of darkness under the moon. Our new album is a statement. Our blood is the ink. Your skin, the scrolls upon we will write. Napalm Records, our messenger. Be ready."

Around the same time, Aires Pereira was admitted as a full member of the band, after playing live with them for eight years.

In January 2012, Moonspell revealed the title of the new album to be Alpha Noir, with a release date of 27 April 2012 and a special edition set to include the album's "musical twin", Omega White. The band's press release cited Bathory, King Diamond, Onslaught, early Metallica, Testament, and Artillery as influences for Alpha Noir, which was described as "an incendiary album". Omega White was instead described as an album of "pure atmosphere and shadow", an homage to Type O Negative and The Sisters of Mercy and similar to Moonspell's second album Irreligious. Alpha Noir and Omega White were both produced and mixed by Tue Madsen, who had previously worked on the band's Under Satanæ and Night Eternal records.

In 2015, Moonspell released a new album titled Extinct. This album continued Moonspell's trend into darker and more gothic music.

On 3 November 2017, they released a concept album named 1755. It detailed the story of the 1755 Lisbon earthquake, and was sung entirely in Portuguese, apart from some choirs in Latin.

On 3 July 2020, Moonspell announced that Mike Gaspar, the original drummer, had left the band, and that he would be replaced by Hugo Ribeiro.

On 26 February 2021, Moonspell released their 12th album called Hermitage.

In 2024, Moonspell announced their plan to record a new album that was scheduled for release in 2025 or 2026. They have also planned to do several 30th anniversary tours for their first three studio albums, from 2025 to 2028. In October 2025, Ribeiro announced that they would start recording their follow-up to Hermitage in December. By January 2026, he announced that Moonspell had almost completed mixing the album. He stated that the upcoming album would be a "very atmospheric and gothic metal album" and have beautiful songs as well as strong and catchy choruses. On 8 March 2026, Moonspell announced that Far from God is the name of their thirteenth studio album, released on 3 July.

== Band members ==
Current members

- Fernando Ribeiro (Langsuyar) – lead vocals (1992–present)
- Pedro Paixão (Passionis/Neophytus) – keyboards, sampler, programming (1992–present)
- Ricardo Amorim (Morning Blade) – guitars, backing vocals (1995–present)
- Aires Pereira (Ahriman) – bass (2004–present)
- Hugo Ribeiro – drums (2020–present)

Former members

- Miguel Gaspar (Mike/Nisroth) – drums (1992–2020)
- João Pedro Escoval (Ares/Tetragrammaton) – bass (1992–1997)
- Duarte Picoto (Mantus) – guitars (1992–1995)
- Luís Lamelas (Malah/Fenrir) – guitars (1992–1993)
- João Pereira (Tanngrisnir) – guitars, backing vocals (1993–1995)
- Sérgio Crestana – bass (1997–2003)

Timeline

== Discography ==
=== Studio albums ===
Title	Album details	Peak chart positions							Sales	Certifications
Title	Album details	POR	GER	FRA	FIN	NLD	AUT	BEL	Sales	Certifications
Wolfheart	Released: 1 April 1995; Label: Century Media Records; Formats: CD, LP, digital download	—	—	—	—	—	—	—		
Irreligious	Released: 29 July 1996; Label: Century Media Records; Formats: CD, LP, digital download	50	55	—	30	93	—	—		
Sin/Pecado	Released: 20 January 1998; Label: Century Media Records; Formats: CD, LP, digital download	1	42	—	18	—	25	—		
The Butterfly Effect	Released: 13 September 1999; Label: Century Media Records; Formats: CD, LP, digital download	—	69	—	—	—	—	—	US: 3,750+	
Darkness and Hope	Released: 18 September 2001; Label: Century Media Records; Formats: CD, LP, digital download	1	43	99	21	—	—	—		
The Antidote	Released: 29 September 2003; Label: Century Media Records; Formats: CD, LP, digital download	4	75	125	—	—	—	—		
Memorial	Released: 25 April 2006; Label: Steamhammer Records; Formats: CD, LP, digital download	1	68	181	—	—	—	—	POR: 10,000+	POR: Gold
Under Satanæ	Released: 12 October 2007; Label: Steamhammer Records; Formats: CD, digital download	12	—	—	—	—	—	—		
Night Eternal	Released: 16 May 2008; Label: Steamhammer Records; Formats: CD, LP, digital download	3	62	144	—	—	—	—	US: 800+	
Alpha Noir/Omega White	Released: 27 April 2012; Label: Napalm Records; Formats: CD, LP, digital download	2	37	108	37	83	44	186	US: 1,200+	
Extinct	Released: 6 March 2015; Label: Napalm Records; Formats: CD, LP, digital download	1	39	178	42	87	54	56		
1755	Released: 3 November 2017; Label: Napalm Records; Formats: CD, LP, digital download	11	72	159	—	—	63	89		
Hermitage	Released: 26 February 2021; Label: Napalm Records; Formats: CD, LP, digital download	1	19	—	—	—	33	60		
Far from God	Released: 3 July 2026; Label: Napalm Records; Formats: CD, LP, digital download	3	27	— (Note: Far from God did not enter the French Top Albums chart, but peaked at number 66 on the French Physical Albums chart.)	— (Note: Far from God did not enter the Official Finnish Albums Chart, but peaked at number seven on the Finnish Physical Albums chart.)	—	19	64		
"—" denotes a recording that did not chart or was not released in that territory.

=== Live albums ===
Title	Album details
Lusitanian Metal	Released: 8 December 2008; Label: Century Media; Formats: CD
Lisboa Under the Spell	Released: 17 August 2018; Label: Napalm Records; Formats: 3CD, DVD, Blu-Ray, Vinyl 3LP
From Down Below	Released: 30 September 2022; Label: Napalm Records; Formats: 4CD, 2DVD, Blu-Ray, Vinyl 2LP

=== Compilations ===
Title	Album details	Peak chart positions
Title	Album details	POR
Sin/Pecado + Irreligious	Released: 2000; Label: Century Media; Formats: 2CD	—
Wolfheart/The Butterfly Effect	Released: 2001; Label: Century Media; Formats: 2CD	—
The Great Silver Eye	Released: 29 June 2007; Label: Century Media Records; Formats: CD, digital download	—

=== EPs ===
Title	Album details
Under the Moonspell	Released: 27 April 1994; Label: Adipocere Records; Formats: CD, Vinyl.
2econd Skin	Released: 29 October 1997; Label: Century Media Records; Formats: CD, 2CD

=== Video albums ===
Title	Video details
Lusitanian Metal	Released: 8 December 2008; Label: Century Media; Formats: DVD
Lisboa Under the Spell	Released: 17 August 2018; Label: Napalm Records; Formats: DVD, Blu-ray

=== Demos ===
Title	Demo details
Anno Satanæ	Released: 24 February 1993; Label: Self-released; Formats: CS

=== Music videos ===
Year	Title	Directed	Album
1996	"Opium"	—	Irreligious
1998	"2econd Skin"	—	Sin / Pecado
1998	"Magdalene"	—	Sin / Pecado
1999	"Butterfly FX"	Andreas Marschall	The Butterfly Effect
2001	"Nocturna"	Tiago Guedes	Darkness and Hope
2003	"Everything Invaded"	Tiago Guedes, Frederico Serra	The Antidote
2004	"I'll See You in My Dreams"	Filipe Melo	I'll See You in My Dreams (soundtrack)
2006	"Finisterra"	Ivan Čolić, Josip Čolić	Memorial
2006	"Luna"	Miguel Braga, Edgar Martins, Sérgio Martins	Memorial
2008	"Scorpion Flower"	Ivan Čolić	Night Eternal
2008	"Night Eternal"	Ivan Čolić	Night Eternal
2012	"Lickanthrope"	Felipe Melo	Alpha Noir/Omega White
2012	"White Skies"	Victor Castro	Alpha Noir/Omega White
2015	"Extinct"	Victor Castro	Extinct
2015	"Domina"	Victor Castro	Extinct
2017	"In Tremor Dei"	Miguel Braga	1755
2017	"Todos os Santos"	Paulo F. Mendes (Editor)	1755
2020	"The Greater Good"	Guilherme Henriques	Hermitage
2020	"Common Prayers"	Guilherme Henriques	Hermitage
2021	"All or Nothing"	Guilherme Henriques	Hermitage
2021	"The Hermit Saints"	Guilherme Henriques	Hermitage
2026	"Far From God"	Pavel Trebukhin	Far From God
2026	"Cross Your Heart"	Pavel Trebukhin	Far From God
