= Extinct (album) =

- Cover art by Seth Siro Anton

Studio album by Moonspell
- Released: 5 March 2015
- Recorded: 2014
- Studio: Fascination Street Studios (Örebro and Stockholm, Sweden)
- Genre: Gothic metal
- Length: 45:38
- Label: Napalm
- Producer: Jens Bogren

Moonspell chronology
Alpha Noir/Omega White (2012)	Extinct (2015)	1755 (2017)

Professional ratings
Review scores
Source	Rating
Blabbermouth.net	8/10 stars

Extinct is the tenth studio album by Portuguese gothic metal band Moonspell, released on 5 March 2015 in several versions with a different cover for each (jewel case, limited deluxe box, mediabook, gatefold LP).

The album was recorded at Fascination Street Studios, and was produced and mixed by Jens Bogren. The cover artwork was designed by Seth Siro Anton. It includes a guest bozuoukitara performance by Yossi Sassi on the track "Medusalem". Also, on that same track, before the guitar solo starts, another guest artist, Mahafsoun, narrates the chorus in the Persian language.

== Track listing ==
All songs written by Moonspell, all lyrics by Fernando Ribeiro

Extinct
No.	Title	Length
1.	"Breathe (Until We Are No More)"	5:33
2.	"Extinct"	4:42
3.	"Medusalem"	5:06
4.	"Domina"	5:09
5.	"The Last of Us"	3:26
6.	"Malignia"	5:06
7.	"Funeral Bloom"	4:10
8.	"A Dying Breed"	4:29
9.	"The Future Is Dark"	5:09
10.	"La Baphomette"	2:48
Total length:		45:38

Deluxe edition
No.	Title	Length
11.	"Until We Are No Less"	7:02
12.	"Doomina"	4:49
13.	"Last of Them"	5:24
14.	"The Past Is Darker"	5:43
Total length:		01:08:34

== Personnel ==
- Fernando Ribeiro – vocals
- Ricardo Amorim – guitars
- Aires Pereira – bass
- Pedro Paixão – keyboards, samples
- Miguel Gaspar – drums

== Charts ==
Chart (2015)	Peak position
Austrian Albums (Ö3 Austria)	54
Belgian Albums (Ultratop Flanders)	56
Belgian Albums (Ultratop Wallonia)	69
Dutch Albums (Album Top 100)	87
Finnish Albums (Suomen virallinen lista)	42
French Albums (SNEP)	178
German Albums (Offizielle Top 100)	39
Portuguese Albums (AFP)	1
Swiss Albums (Schweizer Hitparade)	32
