= Nuno Miguel Gonçalves =

Portuguese musician

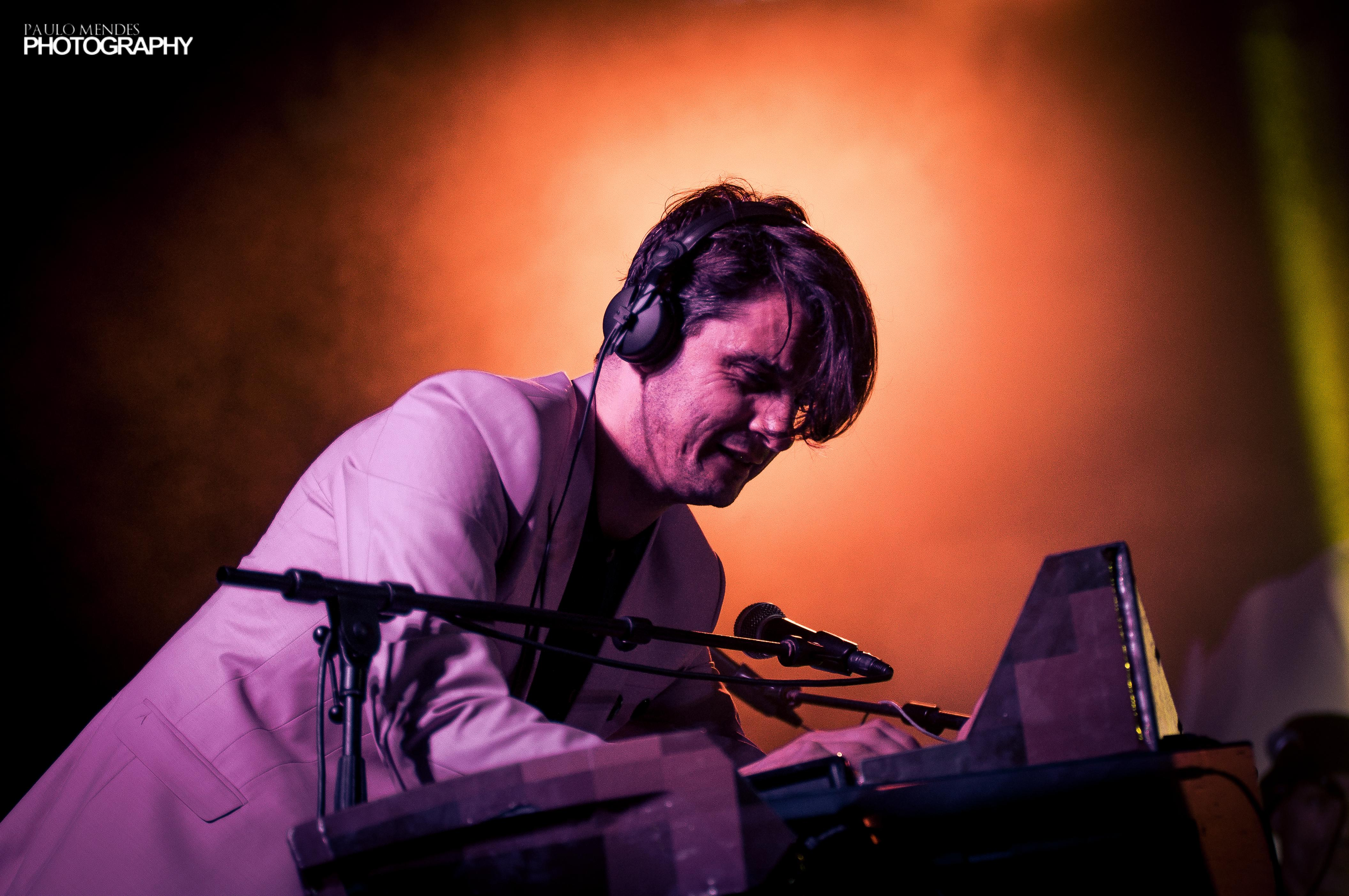
Nuno Gonçalves, The Gift.

Nuno Miguel Cândido Gonçalves, better known as Nuno Gonçalves, is a Portuguese musician, composer and pianist-keyboardist, founder and band member of the Portuguese band The Gift. Some of the band's biggest hits were created by him, including Music, Driving You Slow, Fácil de Entender, Primavera and Clássico.

== Career ==
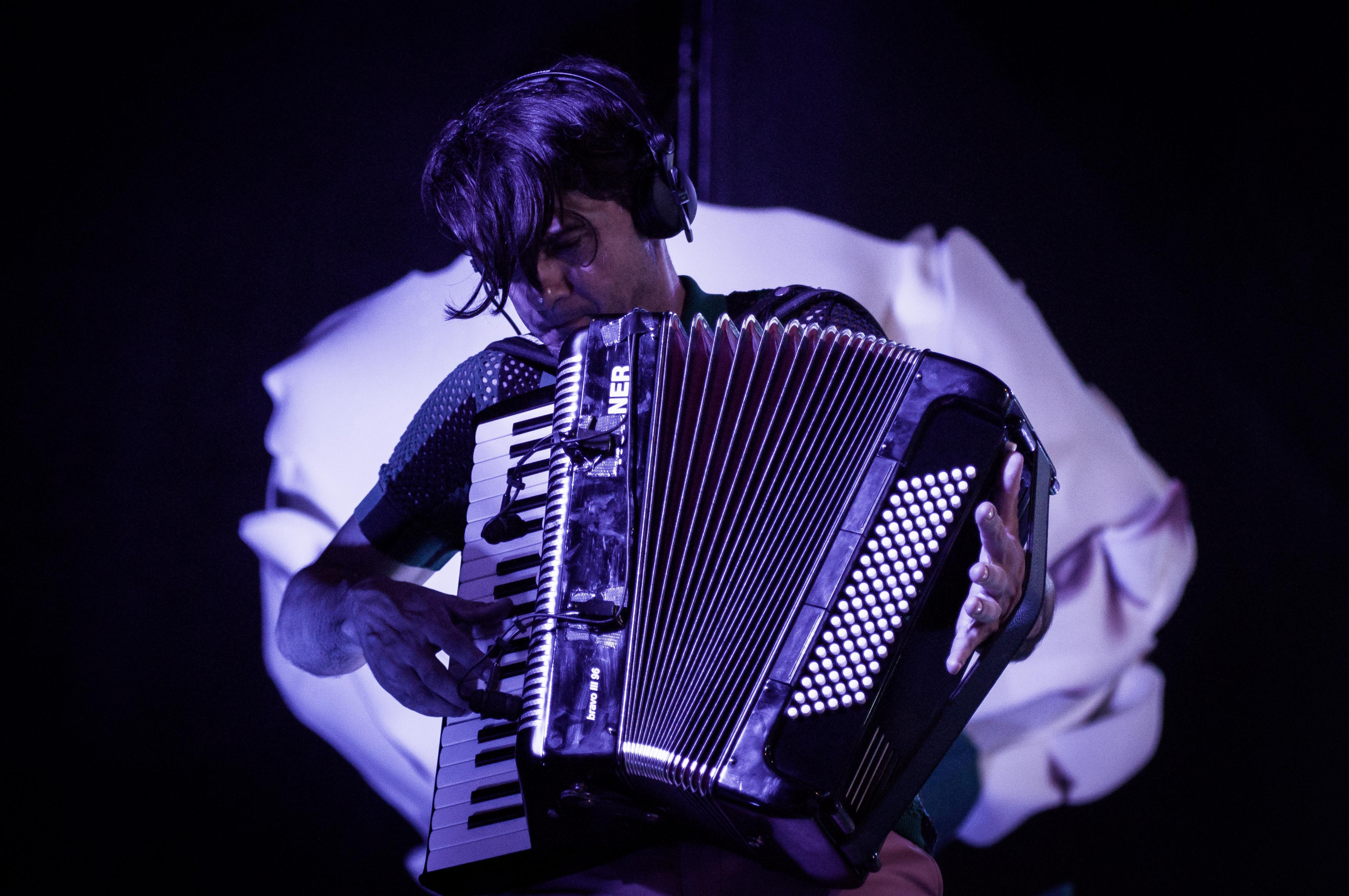
Nuno Gonçalves, The Gift.

Originally from Alcobaça, Nuno Gonçalves founded in 1994 the Alcobaça-based band The Gift which became a nationwide success with some international recognition. He also did the remix of Rodrigo Leão's A Casa which was released as a single and on the reissue of the album. He participated with Sónia Tavares (voice of The Gift) in several live performances of Rodrigo Leão's 2000 album Alma Mater, where they performed the theme A Casa, originally performed by Adriana Calcanhoto. He has produced works by Loto and Jel, among others. He did the soundtrack for the theatre play "Scum Show" by Inestética. He was also one of the founders of the disco club Clinic in Alcobaça.

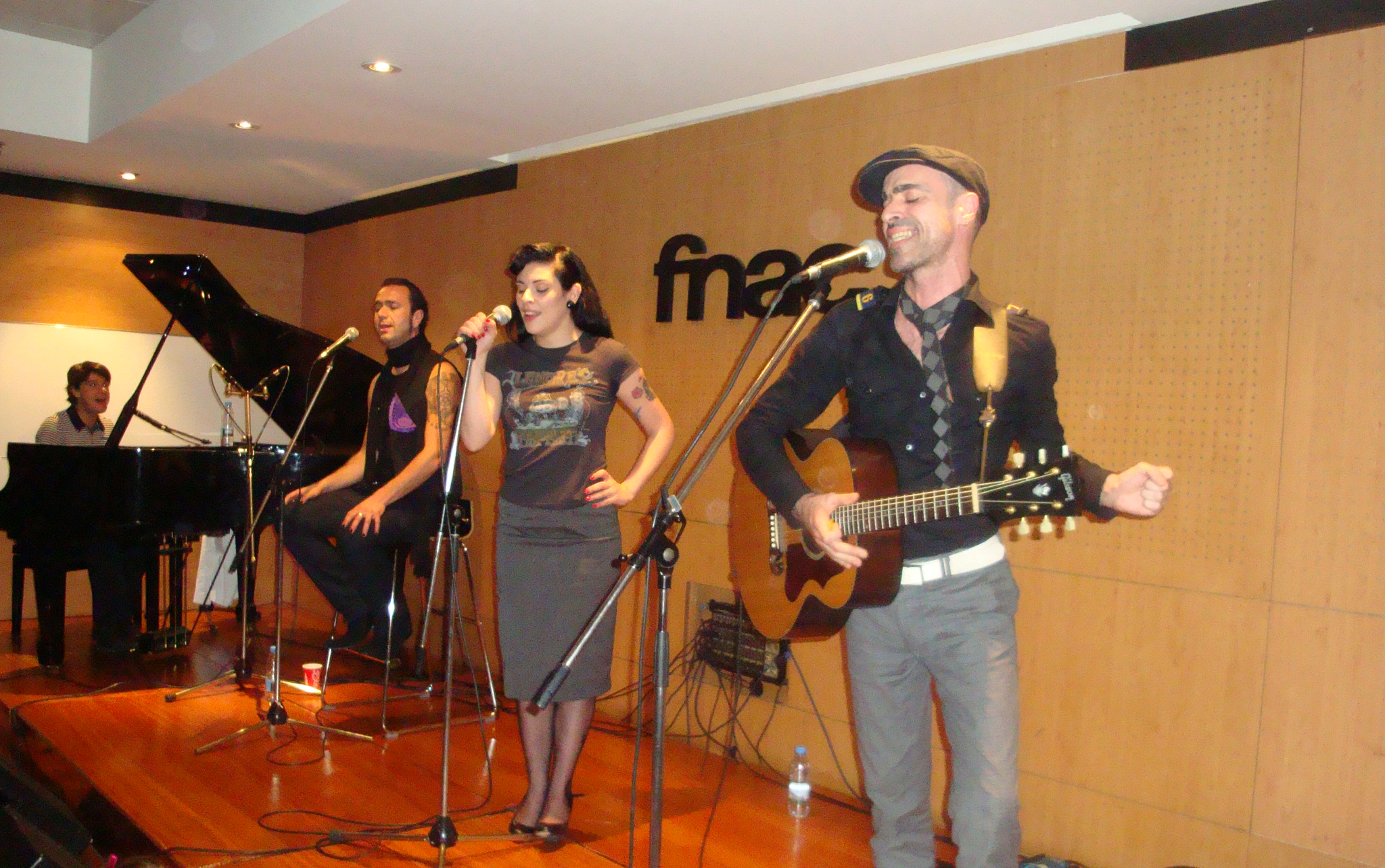
Hoje (Amália Hoje) live at Fnac, Porto, 2009. Nuno Gonçalves is playing the piano, Fernando Ribeiro is the second from the left and Sónia Tavares is the female singer. Paulo Praça is the first from the right.

In 2009, he led the project Hoje, a Portuguese pop project created for the release of a record - the album Amália Hoje - with the reinterpretation of Amália Rodrigues' fados through a pop sound point of view. Nuno Gonçalves was responsible for the choice of the line-up, the arrangements and the musical direction of the group. In 2022, the Amália Hoje show was performed again in two concerts at Culturgest in Lisbon and in the Alcobaça Monastery square in Alcobaça. Nuno Gonçalves appears on the weekly RTP programme Trio D'Ataque (with Miguel Guedes and others) where he talks about football and expresses his point of view as a lover of football and a supporter of Sporting Clube de Portugal.

== Personal life ==
Nuno Gonçalves lives in Madrid, Alcobaça and Porto, and has a daughter called Mia Alexandrina. He is a DJ outside of his band and his acclaimed activity as a musician and composer of The Gift. Throughout his life, there was a time when he played roller hockey, worked in porcelain factories, wrote for newspapers and established a now defunct online radio (Rádio Clinic) and a magazine called Verniz, as well as his disco club Clinic in his hometown Alcobaça. He took a course in journalism.
