= The Antidote (Moonspell album) =

Studio album by Moonspell
- Released: 29 September 2003
- Recorded: 23 March – 12 April 2003
- Studio: Finnvox Studios (Helsinki, Finland)
- Genre: Gothic metal, melodic death metal
- Length: 54:28
- Label: Century Media
- Producer: Hiili Hiilesmaa, Moonspell

Moonspell chronology
Darkness and Hope (2001)	The Antidote (2003)	Memorial (2006)

Singles from The Antidote
- 1. "Everything Invaded" Released: 28 July 2003

Professional ratings
Review scores
Source	Rating
AllMusic	4/5 stars

The Antidote is the sixth studio album by Portuguese gothic metal band Moonspell, released in 2003 by Century Media. It is regarded as a return to a heavier musical style in comparison to the previous album, Darkness and Hope, although it is nonetheless quite different from all the previous albums. The track list was altered for the vinyl version to better suit the side lengths.

The third track, "Everything Invaded", had a music video.

== Book ==
The album was released with a (limited) book named O Antídoto ("the antidote") by José Luís Peixoto. They both share a single concept and the same story. Each song in the CD is sister to a chapter in the book that enhances the story in the lyrics. The CD contains the book in electronic format.

== Track listing ==
=== CD ===
No.	Title	Length
1.	"In and Above Men"	4:11
2.	"From Lowering Skies"	5:25
3.	"Everything Invaded"	6:16
4.	"The Southern Deathstyle"	4:07
5.	"Antidote"	4:45
6.	"Capricorn at Her Feet"	6:04
7.	"Lunar Still"	6:55
8.	"A Walk on the Darkside"	4:44
9.	"Crystal Gazing"	4:52
10.	"As We Eternally Sleep on It"	7:09
Total length:		54:28

=== Vinyl ===
Side A
No.	Title	Length
1.	"In and Above Men"	4:11
2.	"From Lowering Skies"	5:25
3.	"Everything Invaded"	6:16
4.	"The Southern Deathstyle"	4:07
5.	"Lunar Still"	6:55

Side B
No.	Title	Length
1.	"Antidote"	4:45
2.	"Capricorn at Her Feet"	6:04
3.	"A Walk on the Darkside"	4:44
4.	"Crystal Gazing"	4:52
5.	"As We Eternally Sleep on It"	7:09
Total length:		54:28

=== Enhanced CD content ===
Multimedia Player with:

- "The Novel of Antidote" (digital book)
- "Everything Invaded" (video)

== Personnel ==
- Fernando Ribeiro – vocals
- Ricardo Amorim – guitars
- Pedro Paixão – guitars, keyboards, samples
- Miguel Gaspar – drums

Additional personnel

- Niclas Etelävuori – bass
- Paulo Moreira – cover art, layout, photography
- Adriano Esteves – design
- Mika Jussila – mastering
- Hiili Hiilesmaa – producer, engineering, mixing
- Wojtek Blasiak – artwork

== Charts ==
Chart (2003)	Peak position
French Albums (SNEP)	125
German Albums (Offizielle Top 100)	75
Portuguese Albums (AFP)	4
