= The Great Silver Eye =

Compilation album by Moonspell
- Released: 29 June 2007
- Genre: Gothic metal
- Length: 78:55
- Label: Century Media

Moonspell chronology
Memorial (2006)	The Great Silver Eye (2007)	Under Satanæ (2007)

Outer sleeve

Professional ratings
Review scores
Source	Rating
AllMusic	3.5/5 stars

The Great Silver Eye: An Anthology is the first compilation album by Portuguese gothic metal band Moonspell, released on 29 June 2007. It contains the band's most well-known songs.

== Track listing ==
1. "Wolfshade (A Werewolf Masquerade)" – 7:44
2. "Vampiria" – 5:36
3. "Alma Mater" – 5:37
4. "Opium" – 2:47
5. "Raven Claws" – 3:16
6. "Full Moon Madness" – 6:47
7. "2econd Skin" – 4:51
8. "Magdalene" – 6:17
9. "Soulsick" – 4:16
10. "Lustmord" – 3:45
11. "Firewalking" – 3:06
12. "Nocturna" – 3:52
13. "Everything Invaded" – 6:17
14. "Capricorn at Her Feet" – 6:05
15. "Finisterra" – 4:09
16. "Luna" – 4:43

== Personnel ==
Group

- Fernando Ribeiro – lead vocals
- Duarte Picoto (Mantus) – guitars (tracks 1–3)
- João Pereira (Tanngrisnir) – guitars, backing vocals (tracks 1–3)
- Ricardo Amorim – guitars (tracks 4–16)
- João Pedro Escoval (Ares) – bass (tracks 1–6)
- Sérgio Crestana – bass (tracks 7–12)
- Pedro Paixão – keyboards (all tracks), guitars (tracks 13–16)
- Miguel Gaspar – drums

Other musicians

- Niclas Etelävuori – bass (tracks 13–14)
- Waldemar Sorychta – bass (tracks 15–16)
