= The Gift (band) =

Portuguese band

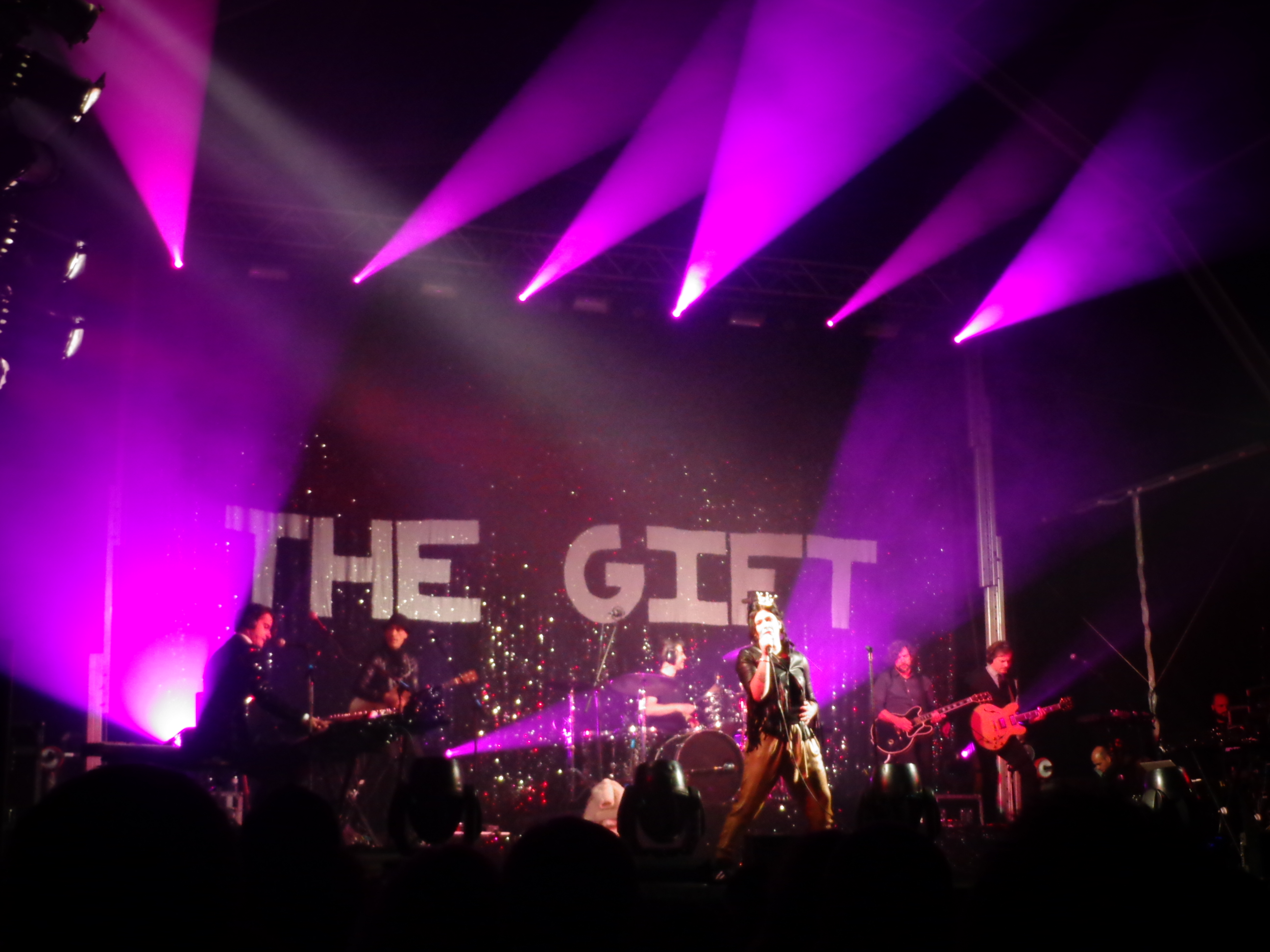
- The Gift performing in Aveiro in 2015

Background information
- Origin: Alcobaça, Portugal
- Genres: Synthpop, electronic, alternative rock
- Years active: 1994–present
- Label: La Folie Records
- Members: Sónia Tavares; Nuno Gonçalves; John Gonçalves; Miguel Ribeiro
- Past members: Ricardo Braga
- Website: thegift.pt

The Gift is a Portuguese alternative rock band, formed in 1994. They have released eight albums to date. In 2005 they won the MTV Europe award for best Portuguese act.

== Biography ==
Formed in 1994, The Gift's original line-up was Sónia Tavares, Nuno and John Gonçalves, Miguel Ribeiro, and Ricardo Braga. Their first show was at the Alcobaça Monastery in July 1995, followed by the Belém Cultural Centre in Lisbon in September 1996, and the Labirintho Bar in Porto in November 1996.

The Gift's first demo record was "Digital Atmosphere", a six-track enhanced CD featuring interviews and videos, which was followed by a tour in 1997. Returning to a four-piece, in 1998 they formed their own label, La Folie.

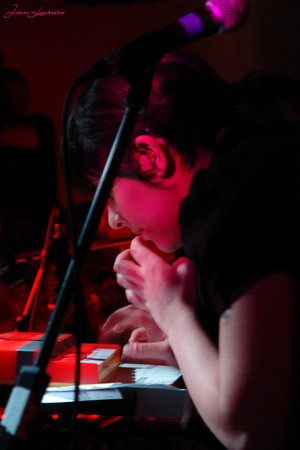
Sónia Tavares, The Gift - photo by João Loureiro

In November 1998, the band's first full record, Vinyl, was released. It was named Album of the Year by the Diário de Notícias newspaper. The band played around 80 concerts and festival appearances in support of the record. At the end of 1999 they performed for the first time abroad at La Cigale in Paris, and a few months later participated in the 2000 MIDEM music fair in Cannes.

In June 2000 the band went on a short international tour, including dates in Germany (Expo 2000 – Hanover), Macau, and Paris.

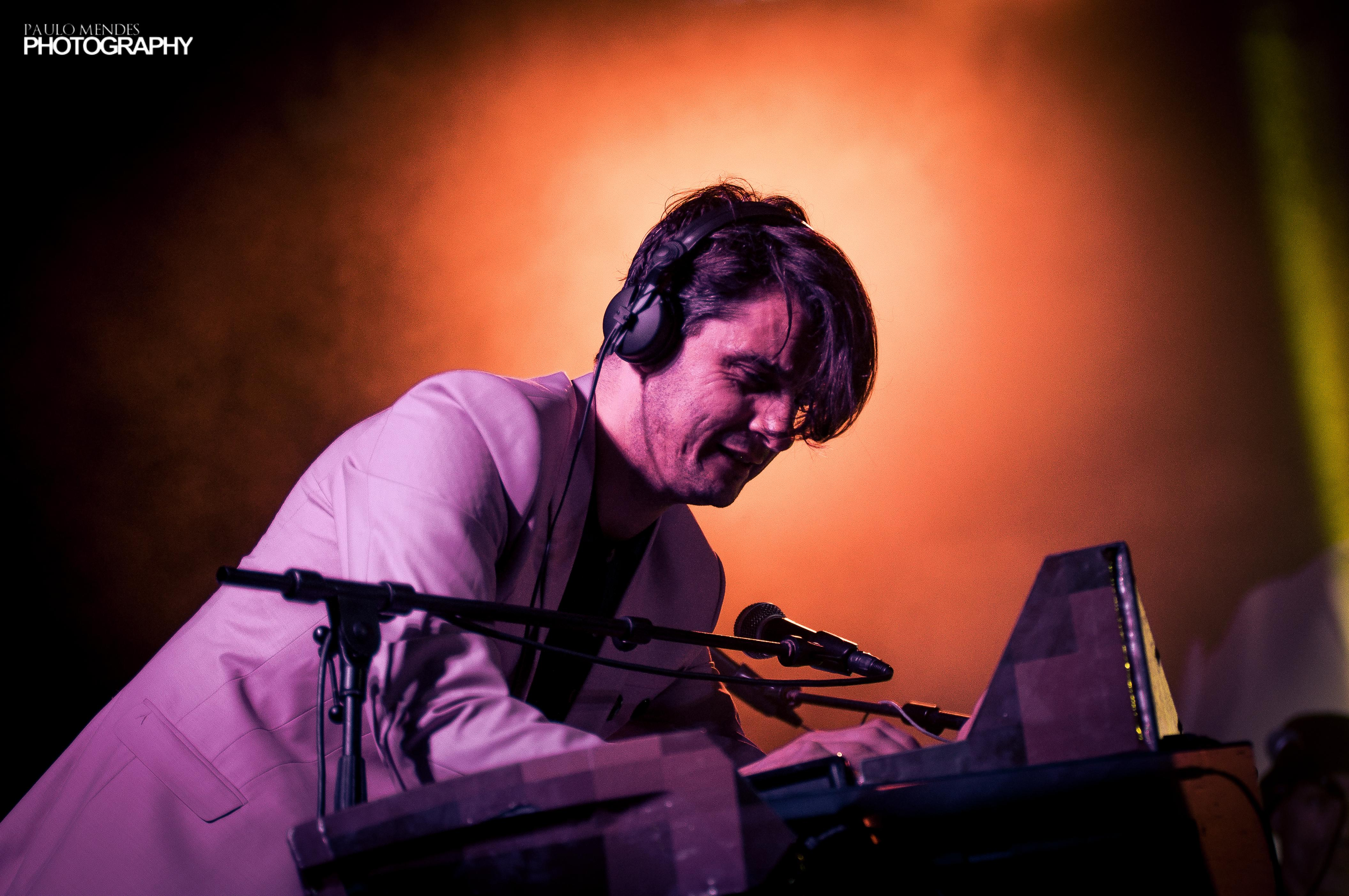
Nuno Gonçalves performing with The Gift.

The Gift's second album, Film, was produced by Howie B and released through La Folie Records. It was gold-certified after selling 25,000 units.

In March 2002, The Gift appeared at the South by Southwest Music & Media Conference in Austin, Texas, as well as various other concerts and festivals around the world over that year. They were invited to open for The Flaming Lips and Cousteau, and in December 2003, were invited to perform one of the first live shows on the recently launched MTV Portugal.

Their 2004 album, AM-FM, also went Gold, selling more than 25,000 copies. In 2005 they won the MTV Europe Award for Best Portuguese Act.

The live album Fácil de Entender was released in 2006.

The Gift performed at the Expo 2008 in Zaragoza.

Their album Explode was released in Portugal on 1 April 2011 and went to number one in the charts.

On 30 September 2016, the group released a new single, "Love Without Violins", which was co-written, co-produced, and featured vocals by Brian Eno. The single was released on La Folie Records. A new album was announced for release in 2017, featuring Eno on several tracks, composed with Nuno Gonçalves and mixed by Flood. Following the release of the new single, The Gift were confirmed to perform for the second time at Eurosonic Noorderslag in Groningen, the Netherlands.

== Members ==
=== Current ===
- Sónia Tavares – lead vocals (1994–present)
- Nuno Gonçalves – keyboards, backing vocals, composer (1994–present)
- John Gonçalves – bass, keyboards (1994–present)
- Miguel Ribeiro – guitar, bass (1994–present)

=== Current touring musicians ===
- Mário Barreiros – drums (2006–present)
- Paulo Praça – guitar, bass (2010–present)
- Israel Costa Pereira – guitar, backing vocals, keyboards (2011–present)

=== Former ===
- Ricardo Braga – keyboards, euphonium (1994–1998)

=== Former touring musicians ===
- Diogo Santos – drums (1998–2006)
- António Bruheim – saxophone (1999–2003)

== Discography ==
=== Albums ===
- Digital Atmosphere (1997) – demo tape without commercial release
- Vinyl (1998)
- Film (2001)
- AM-FM (2004)
- Fácil de Entender (2006)
- Explode (2011)
- Primavera (2012)
- Altar (2017)
- Verão (2019)
- Coral (2022)

=== Singles ===
From Vinyl

- "Ok! Do You Want Something Simple?" (1999)
- "Real (Get Me For...)" (1999)
- "Truth" (2000)

From Film

- "Water Skin" (2001)
- "Question of Love" (2001)
- "Me, myself and i" (2001)

From AM-FM

- "Driving You Slow" (2004)
- "11:33" (2005)
- "Music" (2005)

From Fácil de Entender

- "Fácil de Entender" (2006)

From Explode

- "RGB" (2011)
- "Primavera (2011)
- "singles" (2011)
