= Irreligious (album) =

1996 studio album by Moonspell

Studio album by Moonspell
- Released: 29 July 1996
- Genre: Gothic metal; doom metal
- Length: 42:35
- Label: Century Media
- Producer: Waldemar Sorychta

Moonspell chronology
| Wolfheart (1995) | Irreligious (1996) | Sin/Pecado (1998) |

Singles from Irreligious
- 1. "Opium" Released: 1 October 1996

Professional ratings
Review scores
| Source | Rating |
|---|---|
| AllMusic | 2.5/5 stars |

Irreligious is the second studio album by Portuguese gothic metal band Moonspell, released in 1996. It features some of the best-known songs of the band, such as "Opium", "Ruin & Misery", "Awake!" and "Full Moon Madness". The latter is usually the closing song during almost every Moonspell concert, which over time has become a characteristic of their concerts. Before the song begins, Fernando Ribeiro often makes the sign of the circle (symbolizing the Moon) over the crowd. The third track, "Awake!", features a recording of Aleister Crowley reading his poem "The Poet". Irreligious is the first Moonspell album to feature Ricardo Amorim, who went on to become the band's guitarist and main songwriter for the rest of their career.

The album was promoted by the first Moonspell music video "Opium", which contained imagery of 19th-century-looking opium den.

== Track listing ==
Irreligious track listing
| No. | Title | Length |
|---|---|---|
| 1. | "Perverse... Almost Religious" | 1:07 |
| 2. | "Opium" | 2:48 |
| 3. | "Awake!" | 3:04 |
| 4. | "For a Taste of Eternity" | 3:53 |
| 5. | "Ruin & Misery" | 3:49 |
| 6. | "A Poisoned Gift" | 5:35 |
| 7. | "Subversion" | 2:44 |
| 8. | "Raven Claws" | 3:16 |
| 9. | "Mephisto" | 4:58 |
| 10. | "Herr Spiegelmann" | 4:35 |
| 11. | "Full Moon Madness" | 6:46 |
| Total length: | | 42:35 |

Digipak release bonus track
| No. | Title | Length |
|---|---|---|
| 12. | "Opium" (radio edit) | 2:48 |
| Total length: | | 45:23 |

== Personnel ==
- Fernando Ribeiro – vocals
- Ricardo Amorim – guitars
- João Pedro Escoval (Ares) – bass
- Pedro Paixão – keyboards, samples
- Miguel Gaspar (Mike) – drums

Guest musicians

- Markus Freiwald – percussion on "For a Taste of Eternity"
- Birgit Zacher – vocals on "Raven Claws"

Production

- Rolf Brenner – photography
- Siggi Bemm – engineering
- Waldemar Sorychta – producer, mixing

== Charts ==
Chart performance for Irreligious
| Chart (1996) | Peak position |
|---|---|
| Finnish Albums (Suomen virallinen lista) | 30 |
| Dutch Albums (Album Top 100) | 93 |
| German Albums (Offizielle Top 100) | 55 |

2023 chart performance for Irreligious
| Chart (2023) | Peak position |
|---|---|
| Portuguese Albums (AFP) | 50 |
