= Fernando Ribeiro =

Portuguese singer and writer (born 1974)

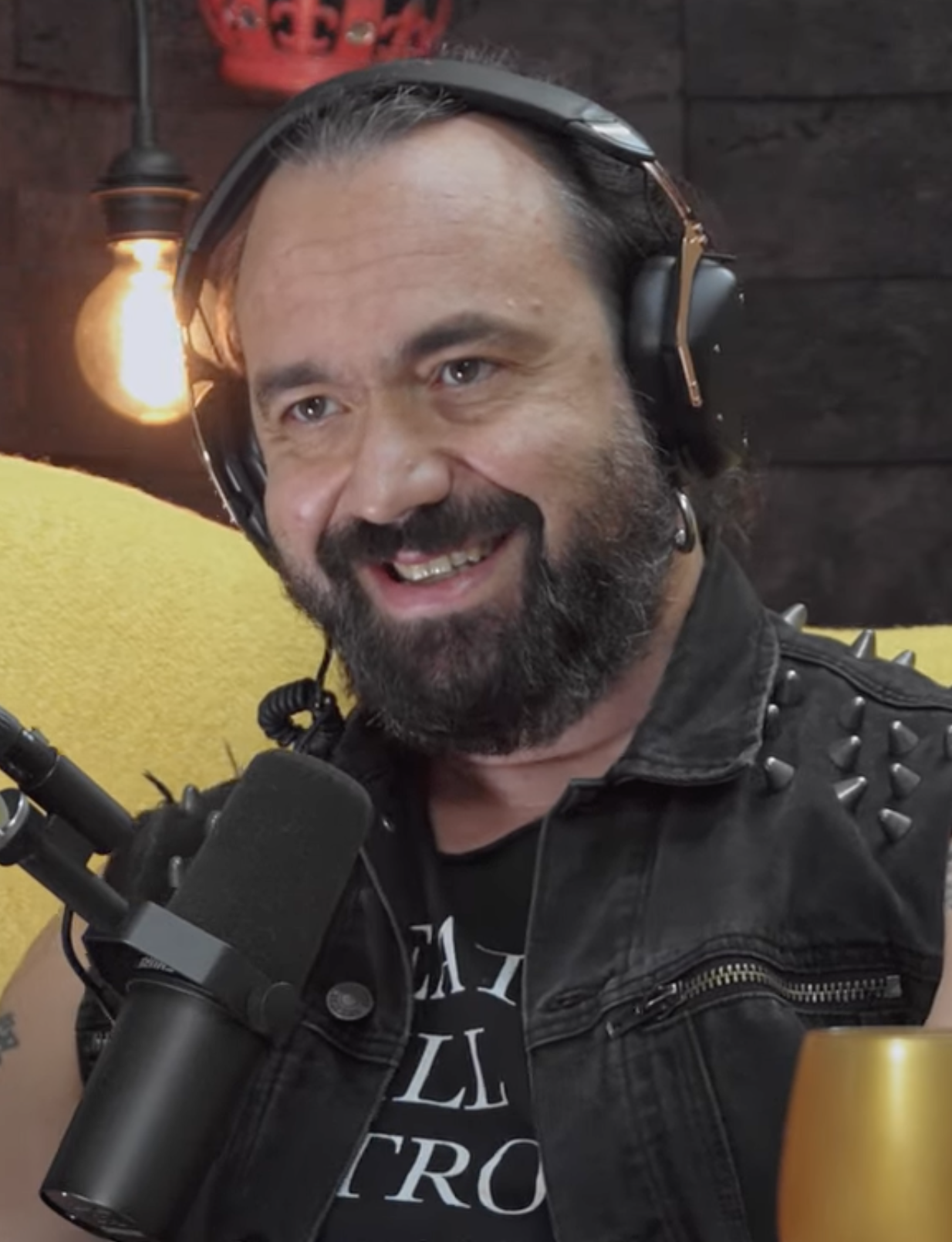
- Ribeiro in 2020

Background information
- Also known as: Langsuyar
- Born: Fernando Miguel Santos Ribeiro; August 26, 1974 (age 51); Lisbon, Portugal
- Genres: Gothic metal, black metal, folk metal, doom metal
- Occupations: Singer, lyricist, poet
- Instrument: Vocals
- Years active: 1989–present
- Spouse: Sónia Tavares
- Website: moonspell.com

Fernando Ribeiro (born August 26, 1974) is a Portuguese singer, vocalist, and lyricist for the Portuguese gothic metal band Moonspell. In addition to this activity, he is also a writer and translator.

== Life and career ==
Raised in Brandoa, just outside of Lisbon, Fernando Ribeiro formed Morbid God in 1989, which later changed its name to Moonspell in 1992. Concurrently with his musical endeavors, as a young adult, Ribeiro studied philosophy at the University of Lisbon for a period of time with the unfulfilled aim of becoming a high school philosophy teacher. He has published three books of poetry, namely, Como Escavar um Abismo (2001), As Feridas Essenciais (2004), and Diálogo de Vultos (2007). He has also written a book of prose, Senhora Vingança (2011).

He took part in the project "A Sombra Sobre Lisboa – Lovecraftian Tales in the City of Seven Hills". A literary work featuring several authors and invoking Lovecraft's worlds adapted to the city of Lisbon. He wrote the introductions to The Best Stories of Howard Phillips Lovecraft, published in 2005, and translated the comic biography Lovecraft into Portuguese.

He has written regularly for the Portuguese metal magazine LOUD! in a monthly column entitled The Eternal Spectator.

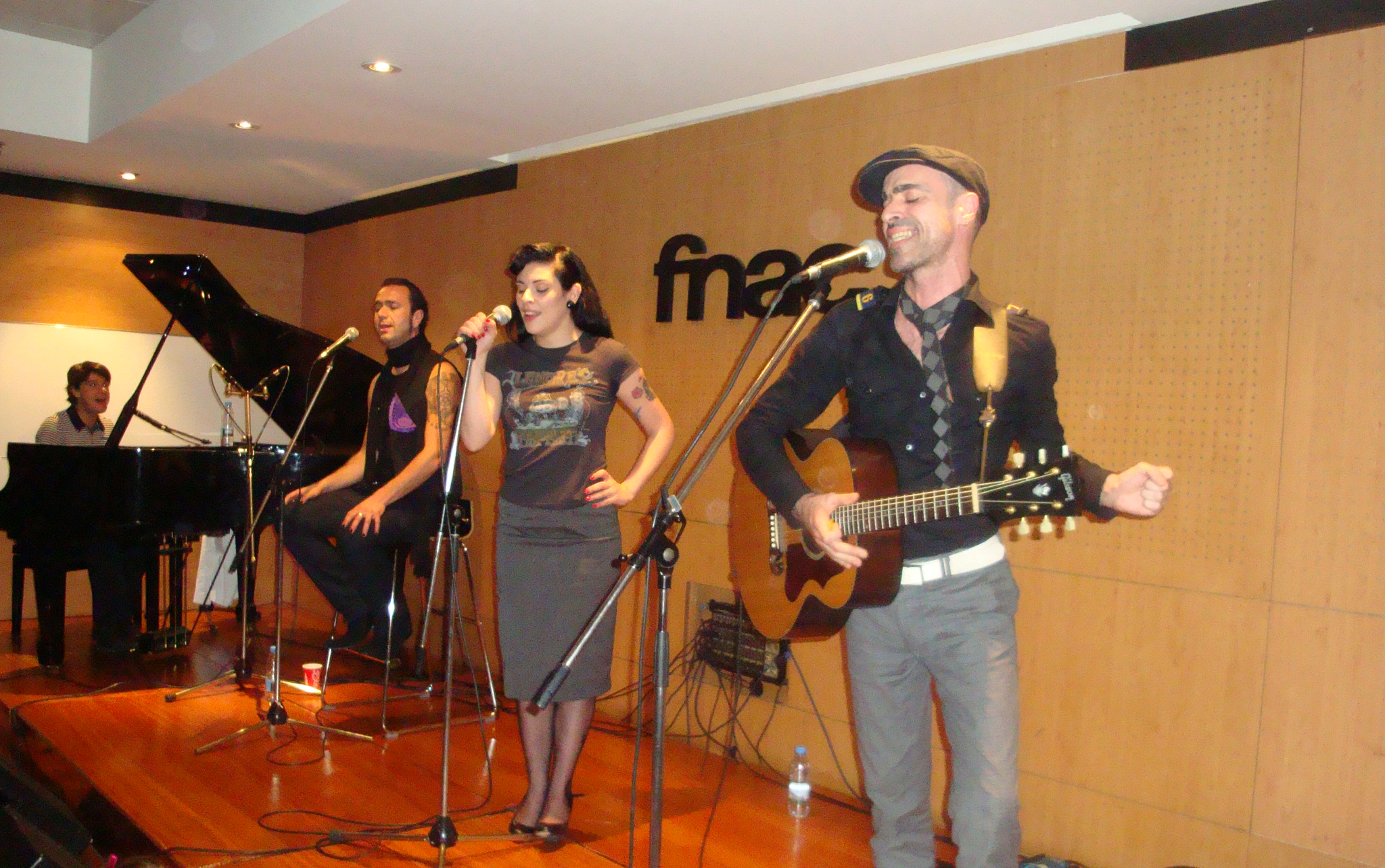
Amália Hoje live at Fnac, in Porto, 2009. Ribeiro is the second from the left, Nuno Gonçalves is playing the piano, and Sónia Tavares is the female singer. Paulo Praça is the first from the right.

In 1998, he was one of the founders of the Daemonarch music project.

In 2009, he was part of the Amália Hoje project, which, together with Sónia Tavares, Nuno Gonçalves and Paulo Praça, re-recorded some of Amália Rodrigues' classics. In the same year he also took part in a song by the band Bizarra Locomotiva, called "Anjo Exilado" from the album Álbum Negro and in the Orfeu Rebelde project, released by Optimus Discos.

In 2022, Fernando Ribeiro was chosen to play the role of a high member of the clergy, Gabriel Malagrida, for a documentary in the History TV channel about the 1755 Lisbon earthquake.

== Personal life ==
He has been married since 2017 to Sónia Tavares, lead singer of the band The Gift. They have a son, Fausto, born in 2012, and live in Alcobaça. Ribeiro is a supporter of FC Porto and attributes that personal preference to his father's influence since he was a fan of the northern sports club and was born in Mondim de Basto, in Vila Real District, Northern Portugal.
