= Janette Beckman =

British documentary photographer

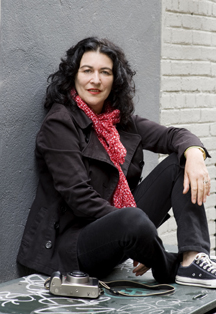
- Janette Beckman
- Born: 1959 (age 66–67); London
- Education: Saint Martin's School of Art; London College of Communication
- Occupations: Documentary photographer; music photographer
- Notable work: Rap, Portraits & Lyrics of a Generation of Black Rockers (1991); Made in the UK The Music of Attitude 1977–1983 (2005); The Breaks, Stylin' and Profilin' 1982–1990 (2008); El Hoyo Maravilla (2011); The MashUp, Hip Hop Photos Remixed by Iconic Graffiti Artists (2018); Rebels: From Punk to Dior (2021)
- Website: janettebeckman.com

Janette Beckman is a British documentary photographer who has worked in London, New York and Los Angeles. Beckman describes herself as a documentary photographer. While she produces a lot of work on location (such as the cover of The Police album Zenyatta Mondatta, taken in the middle of a forest in the Netherlands), she is also a studio portrait photographer. Her work has appeared on records for the major labels, and in magazines including Esquire, Rolling Stone, Glamour, Italian Vogue, The Times, Newsweek, Jalouse, Mojo and others.

== Early life ==
Beckman attended King Alfred School in Golders Green, north London from 1953 to 1967. She was born to a Jewish family. She spent a year at Saint Martin's School of Art, and then three years at London College of Communication studying photography.

== Punk and hip-hop photography ==
After initially working for Sounds magazine with Vivien Goldman – her first shoot was with Siouxsie and the Banshees – she had a job shooting for music magazines such as Melody Maker and The Face, with a studio and darkroom in central London. Her primary focus was the UK's burgeoning punk subculture. Beckman relocated to New York City in 1982 and continued her career, shooting for her UK clients as well as new ones in the U.S.

Upon arriving in New York, Beckman presented her portfolio to American record companies looking for work shooting album covers, but the gritty feel of her work did not fit the "airbrushed" aesthetic preferred at the time. She was passed on to smaller rap and hip-hop labels, where she photographed acts such as Salt-N-Pepa, LL Cool J, Public Enemy, and the Beastie Boys in their early days. In a 2015 interview with American Photo magazine, she recalled "It is amazing, 30 years later, people going 'oh you photographed legends.' I guess I did, but they weren't legends when I was taking pictures of them".

== Exhibitions ==
In August 2010 Beckman produced an exhibition entitled Archive of Attitude at Arkitip's Project Space, Los Angeles, which included "works from her time in London during the punk era through the hip-hop decade in New York and Los Angeles". Arkitip published a supplement to the show in the form of a broadsheet newspaper full of Beckman's photographs. That same month photographer Jill Furmanovsky chose Beckman's Paul Weller and Pete Townsend as one of her personal favourite music photographs for an article with NME.

In March 2011 the Morrison Hotel Gallery in New York City opened an exhibition at their Bowery location titled Catch the Beat: The Roots of Punk and Hip Hop, a joint exhibition of photographs by Beckman and photographer David Corio. In a recording of Beckman working on the streets of Harlem, her photograph of LL Cool J with his boom box is described as hip-hop history, known around the world.

In July 2011, Flavorwire named Beckman one of "10 Rock Photographers You Should Know". In the same month, Beckman launched "Archive of Attitude", a blog recounting the stories behind the photographs.

In March highlights her current advertising campaign was for Kangol, her third lookbook for the music-friendly headwear company.

In the summer of 2012 Beckman joined the faculty at the International Center of Photography in New York City to teach a course on photographing youth culture. Beckman took on a new working relationship with the British style magazine Jocks and Nerds for which she later became the New York City editor.

Beckman appeared in the Stüssy/Yo! MTV Raps two-part documentary "We Were All Watching / Part 2, Fashion in the Golden Age of Hip Hop," alongside Bill Adler, Dante Ross, Questlove, and others.

A trip to Caracas in 2013 produced a body of work on Tuki dancers, who combine street styles, pop, house and techno culture. Also in 2013, Ono Arte gallery in Bologna held two exhibitions: Made in the UK and My Generation.

2014 brought a residency at the Bemis Center for Contemporary Arts in Omaha, Nebraska, in conjunction with an exhibition at Carver Savings and Loan Association titled Rebel Culture: Legends of Hip Hop and the Go Hard Boyz (Harlem Bikers). Beckman's "Hip Hop Mash Up" was launched in 2014. She teamed up with graffiti artists including Cey Adams, to reinterpret photos from her archive, including Slick Rick, Public Enemy, Run DMC, and Big Daddy Kane. By early 2015 prints had been exhibited at Salon Atelier-Galerie in Paris, France, and at Gansevoort Market, New York City. Later in 2015 comes an exhibition at the Museum of the City of New York, with photographs by Beckman, including the Mash Up, along with two other New York City photographers, Joe Conzo and Martha Cooper: Hip-Hop Revolution presents more than 80 photographs taken between 1977 and 1990. Also in 2015, Beckman curated an exhibition and slideshow of photographs of musicians from across four decades by dozens of photographers for Photoville, a two-week exhibition of photography in Brooklyn, NY.

In conjunction with the celebrations in the UK of 40 years since the birth of punk, in 2016, the Punctum Gallery in London's Chelsea Art College hosted a punk version of the Mash Up, and shoe store Fiorentini + Baker in east London hosted an exhibition of photos of punks from Beckman's archive. The Photographers' Gallery in London also included photos in their Punk Weekender.

Works were included in Tastemakers & Earthshakers: Notes from Los Angeles Youth Culture, 1943 – 2016 a "multimedia exhibition that traverses eight decades of style, art, and music, and presents vignettes that consider youth culture as a social class, distinct issues associated with young people, principles of social organization, and the emergence of subcultural groups". It opened in October 2016, at the Vincent Price Art Museum in East Los Angeles.

Here We Are is Burberry's exhibition of British social and documentary photography, featuring Beckman, Bill Brandt, Shirley Baker, Jane Bown, Martin Parr, and others, which opened in Clerkenwell in September 2017. Worn in New York: 68 Sartorial Memoirs of the City, a book by Emily Spivack (Abrams Books, 2017), had "clothing-inspired narratives" and included Beckman's Def Jam jacket.

The Fahey/Klein Gallery held a solo exhibition in October 2018, that included photographs of hip hop, British punk, and the Mash Up.

Beckman's photographs were included in the "Represent" Exhibition at the Smithsonian's National Museum of African American History and Culture, May 2018 – 2019

Further exhibitions include solo shows "Rebels" at Fotografiska New York in 2021; "Rebels: From Punk to Dior" at Fahey Klein Gallery in 2022; and "Rebels" at Foam photography museum, Amsterdam, in 2024.

== 50th Anniversary of Hip-Hop ==
Photographs were in various exhibitions marking the 50th anniversary, including "Hip Hop: Conscious, Unconscious" at Fotografiska New York, and Fotografiska Stockholm; and "Get Rich or Die Tryin'" at the international photography festival 'Cortona On The Move' in the Tuscan town of Cortona Her work was featured in editorial publications including Vanity Fair and "Fresh Fly Fabulous: 50 Years of Hip Hop Style" Rizzoli Electa, 2023. She had a solo exhibition at South Street Seaport in New York where her photographs were displayed outdoors, and was interviewed there for NYC Mayor's Office of Media and Entertainment for a segment called "That's So Dope, Hip Hop Beyond Music".

== Permanent Collections ==
- National Museum of African American History and Culture
- Museum of the City of New York
- National Portrait Gallery, London

== Publications ==
=== Publications by Beckman ===
- Rap: Portraits and Lyrics of a Generation of Black Rockers. America: St. Martin's, 1991. England: Omnibus, 1991. With text by Bill Adler.
- Made in the UK; The Music of Attitude. PowerHouse, 2005. Images of, and stories about, a variety of bands and cultures from 1977 to 1983: rockabillies, punks, mods, and dub artists; Elvis Costello, Sex Pistols, The Ramones. With a foreword by Paul Smith, and an essay by Vivien Goldman.
- The Breaks: Stylin' and Profilin. PowerHouse, 2007. Images of rap and hip hop stars from 1982 to 1990 including Afrika Bambaataa, Run DMC, Slick Rick, Salt-n-Pepa and Grandmaster Flash.
- El Hoyo Maravilla. Dashwood Books, 2011. Photographs in El Hoyo Maravilla. Black and white photographs from the 1980s of one of East LA's Hispanic gangs.
- The Mash Up: Hip-Hop Photos Remixed by Iconic Graffiti Artists Hat and Beard, 2018
- Rebels: From Punk to Dior. Drago, 2022

=== Publications with contributions by Beckman ===
- Contact High: A Visual History of Hip-Hop by Vikki Tobak. Penguin Random House/Clarkson Potter, 2018.
- Smithsonian Anthology of Hip-Hop and Rap National Museum of African American History and Culture, 2021.
- Her Dior: Maria Grazia Chiuri's New Voice by Maria Grazia Chiuri, Text by Maria Luisa Frisa. Rizzoli, 2021.
- LL COOL J Presents 'The Streets Win: 50 Years of Hip-Hop Greatness' by LL COOL J and Vikki Tobak and Alec Banks, Rizzoli, 2023

== Selection of record sleeves ==
=== The Police ===
- Outlandos d'Amour
- Zenyatta Mondatta
- Greatest Hits, The Police
- Reggatta de Blanc

=== EPMD ===
- Unfinished Business
- Strictly Business

=== Salt-n-Pepa ===
- A Salt With a Deadly Pepa
- Push It
- The Millennium Collection

=== Grandmaster Flash & the Furious Five ===
- On the Strength
- Gold

=== Other ===
- The Go-Go's – "We Got the Beat"
- M.I.A. – Kala
- Peter Frampton – "Lying"
- Joe Jackson – "Steppin' Out"
- Jungle Brothers – "Doin' Our Own Dang"
- Tracy Chapman – "Fast Car"
- Ministry – "I Wanted To Tell Her"
- UMC'S – Fruits of Nature
- New Edition – "'Candy Girl'"
- Rob Base and DJ E-Z Rock – "Get on the Dance Floor"
- Run-D.M.C. – "Mary Mary"
- Babatundi Olatunji – Love Drum Talk
- Monie Love – Down to Earth (US cover)
- Dana Dane – Dana Dane with Fame
- Jennifer Koh – Violin Fantasies
- The Gyrlz – Love Me Or Leave Me
