= Michael Benabib =

American portrait photographer

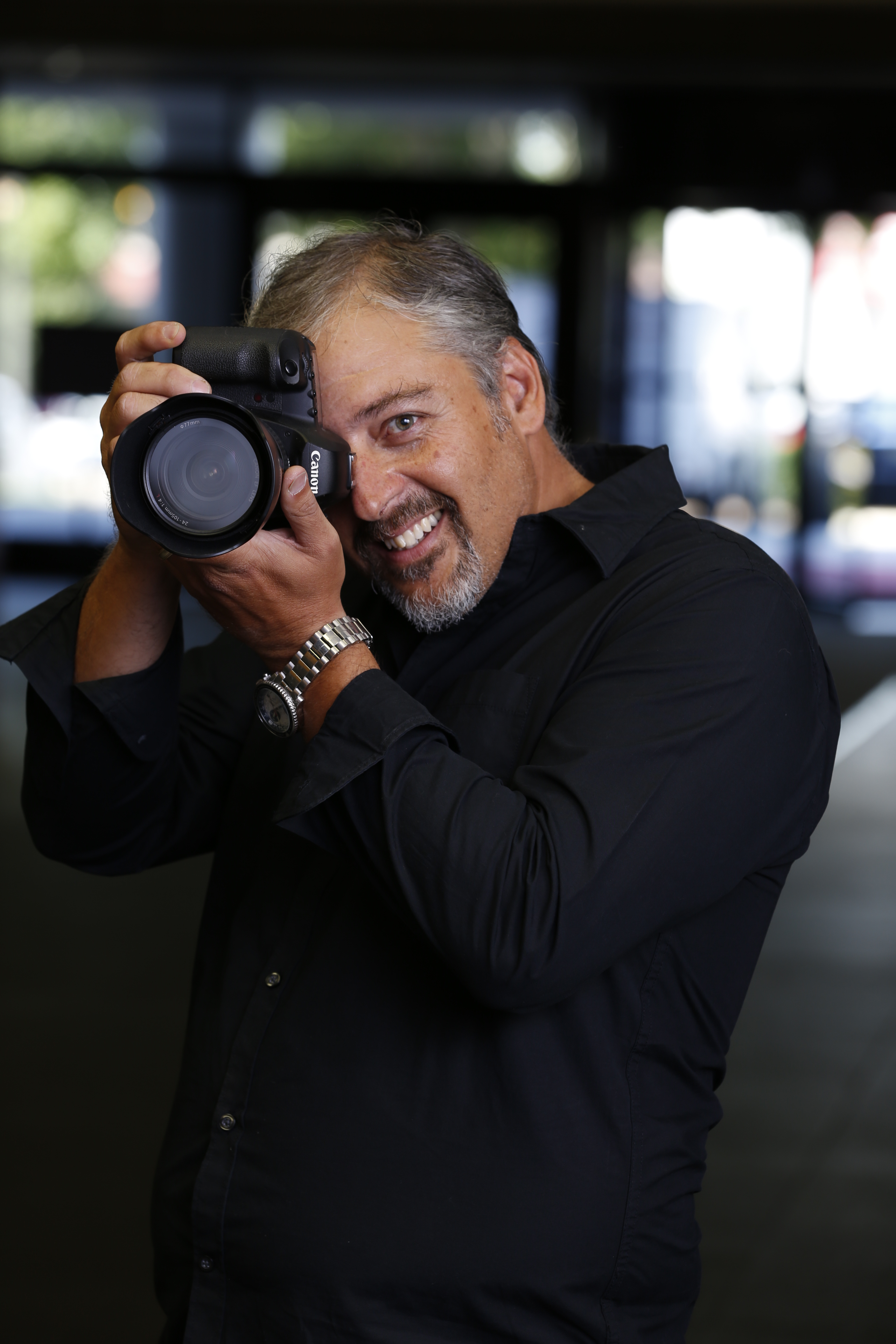
- Born: Manhattan, New York
- Citizenship: American
- Occupation: Portrait Photographer
- Relatives: Roberto Benabib (brother), Kim Benabib (brother)

Michael Benabib is an American portrait photographer, known for his portraits of David Bowie, Tupac Shakur, Sean Combs, and Keith Richards among others. Notable portrait photography of public figures include Bill Clinton, Alan Dershowitz and Loretta Lynch. His work has appeared in publications including Vanity Fair, Vogue, GQ, Rolling Stone, Vibe, ESPN The Magazine, The Wall Street Journal, The New York Times, NPR and Newsweek. His work was included to photography collections on display by The Smithsonian and MoMa.

== Hip-hop photography ==
In the 1980s, Michael freelanced with Rush Management and Def Jam Records; his photography of musicians include Rakim, LL Cool J, Public Enemy, DJ Jazzy Jeff & The Fresh Prince, among many others.

In 2007, Watson-Guptill Publications and Billboards Books published “In Ya Grill: The Faces Of Hip-Hop” the hip-hop photography of Michael Benabib and text by Bill Adler.

== Career ==
In 1995, his editorial photography assignments for magazines include The New York Times Magazine, Newsweek, Rolling Stone, Adweek, Forbes, ESPN The Magazine, and Bloomberg Markets.

In 1997, his editorial magazine photography led to advertising assignments for brands including Heineken, Nissan, Sprite, Lugz, PETA and Planned Parenthood.

In the early 2000s, his assignments include Forbes Life and Fortune 500 companies such as American Express, CitiBank and Pfizer, among others.

== Exhibitions ==
In April 14 to April 27, 2023, a one-man show of Michael Benabib's work titled "In Your Grill" exhibited at the NYC Legacy Gallery on Orchard Street Focused on portraits of prominent hip-hop celebrities including Tupac Shakur, Sean Combs, and others. Featured works by Michael Benabib, known for his iconic photos of hip-hop legends.

Online Digital Gallery Printed 2003 National Museum of African American History & Culture NMAAHC exhibition titled “Photographic print of Biggie Smalls, Tupac, Redman at Club Amazon, NYC” includes A photograph of Biggie Smalls.

August 12, 2023, FUTURE GALLERY 4 ELEMENTS Celebrating 50 years of Hip Hop 50 Upper Alabama St SW, ATL, exhibition titled “Celebrating 50 years of Hip Hop". The highlight of the event will be the gallery art exhibit of Michael Benabib's @classichiphopartists portraits of prominent hip hop artists such as Eric B & Rakim, Dr Dre, Tupac Shakur and many others.

The Art of Hip Hop Presents The Smithsonian's Eyejammie Hip-Hop Photo Collection in Partnership with "Monster Energy" at the Museum of Graffiti Miami Iconic images will include vintage portraits of hip-hop immortals like Sylvia Robinson, Run-DMC, Flavor Flav, Bun B, Cypress Hill, Eazy E, Dondi White, Slick Rick, T.I., Pitbull, Biggie Smalls, Snoop Dogg, and David Banner, as well some of the reggae greats whose work preceded and was influential to hip-hoppers, starting with Lee “Scratch” Perry. The celebrated photographers who created these portraits include Michael Benabib.

The Art of Hip Hop — Eyejammie Hip-Hop Photo Collection (Miami, 2025) Exhibition dates & venue: The Art of Hip Hop gallery in Miami's Wynwood Arts District hosted an immersive, interactive presentation of selections from the Smithsonian's Eyejammie Hip-Hop Photo Collection, opening on March 22, 2025 Originating from the Eyejammie Fine Arts Gallery founded by Bill Adler in 2003, the collection comprises over 400 photographic prints from 59 photographers, acquired by the Smithsonian's National Museum of African American History and Culture in 2015 The Miami presentation included rare ephemera like a white 1986 Mercedes reminiscent of Rakim's “Benzeeto” photoshoot by Michael Benabib on New York City's Bleecker Street

In 2017, the Museum of Modern Art (MoMa) exhibition titled “Is Fashion Modern?” includes his photography of Tupac Shakur.

In 2017, Smithsonian Institution's National Museum of African-American History and Culture exhibition titled “More Than A Picture” includes his photography acquired from the Eyejammie Photo Collection.

In 2018, The Smithsonian exhibition titled “Represent” includes his hip-hop photography of MC Lyte, Tupac Shakur, and Mary J. Blige. This exhibition showcases different photographs than those displayed at The Smithsonian's exhibition in 2017.

In June 2018, Bond Street Print Shop photography exhibition fundraiser to benefit Southern Poverty Law Center including print sales of his portrait photography.

In 2019, The Annenberg Space For Photography in Culver City, California hosted an exhibit entitled Contact High: A Visual History of Hip Hop, based upon the contents of the book in association with the museum's 10th anniversary. The exhibit included his photography.

In 2020, Contact High: A Visual History of Hip-Hop was exhibited at the International Center of Photography in New York as part of the inauguration of the ICP's new location at 79 Essex Street on Manhattan's Lower East Side.

== Books ==
- In Ya Grill: The Faces of Hip Hop. The hip-hop photography of Michael Benabib. Billboard Books. 2007. ISBN 978-0-8230-7885-1.
1. Definition: The Art and Design of Hip-Hop Book; by Bill Adler and Cey Adams (2002). Definition: The Art and Design of Hip-Hop Book. HarperCollins Publishers. ISBN 978-0-06-143885-1.
2. Back In The Day: My Life and Time with Tupac Shakur (1997). Back In The Day: My Life and Times with Tupac Shakur. Random House Publishing. ISBN 0-345-44775-1.
3. RAP TEES; by DJ Ross One (2023). Independently published and distributed by Wash Cold Books. ISBN 979-8-218-04872-3.
4. Iteams: Is Fashion Modern?; Moma by Paola Antonelli(2017). ARTBOOK | D.A.P. in the United States and Canada. ISBN 978-1-63345-036-3.
5. Rapper's Deluxe; How Hip Hop Made The World by Todd Boyd (2024). Phaidon Press. ISBN 978-1-83866-622-4.
6. LL COOL J Preents The Streets Win; 50 Years Of Hip Hop Greatness by LL Cool J, Vikki Tobak and Alec Banks (2023).. Rizzoli International Publications. ISBN 978-0-8478-7316-6.
7. Smithsonian Anthology of Hip Hop and Rap: by (NMAAHC) and Smithsonian Folkways Recordings (2021). Smithsonian Anthology of Hip Hop and Rap: . Smithsonian Folkways Recording. ISBN 978-1-7341305-0-8.
8. Def Jam Recordings; The First 25 Years of the Last Great Record Label by Def Jam (Author), Bill Adler (Author), Dan Charnas (Author), Rick Rubin (2011). Def Jam Recordings: he First 25 Years of the Last Great Record Label. Rizzoli. ISBN 978-0-8478-3371-9.
9. 75 Years of Atlantic Records; edited by Reuel Golden (2025). 75 Years of Atlantic Records: A Style Book. Taschen . ISBN 978-3-8365-9205-5.
10. Ice Cold. A Hip-Hop Jewelry History; by Vikki Tobak (2022). Ice Cold: A Hip-Hop Jewelry History. Taschen. ISBN 978-3-8365-8497-5.
11. Contact High: A Visual History of Hip-Hop by Vikki Tobak (2018). Contact High: A Visual History of Hip-Hop. Crown Publishing Group. ISBN 978-0-525-57388-3.
12. Bill Adler; Dan Charnas (2011). Def Jam Recordings: The First 25 Years of the Last Great Record Label. Random House Incorporated. ISBN 978-0-8478-3371-9.
13. Paola Antonelli; Michelle Millar Fisher (5 October 2017). Items - Is Fashion Modern?. Moma. ISBN 978-1-63345-036-3.
14. Tommy Hilfiger; David A. Keeps (1997). All-American: A Style Book. Universe Pub. ISBN 978-0-7893-0050-8.
