= Benabib =

Benabib may refer to:

- Michael Benabib, an American portrait photographer
- Roberto Benabib, television writer, Weeds (2005)
