= Bill Adler =

American music journalist and critic

- Born: December 18, 1951 (age 74); Brooklyn, New York City, New York, U.S.
- Education: University of Michigan
- Occupation: Journalist
- Spouse: Sara Moulton
- Children: 2
- Writing career
- Genre: Hip-Hop
- Subject: Music

Bill Adler (born December 18, 1951) is an American music journalist and critic. Since the late 1960s, he has worked in the music business in a variety of capacities, including as a record store clerk, radio disc jockey, critic, publicist, biographer, record label executive, documentary filmmaker, museum consultant, art gallerist, curator, and archivist. He is known best for his tenure as director of publicity at Def Jam Recordings (1984–1990), the period of his career to which the critic Robert Christgau was referring when he described Adler as a "legendary publicist".

== Early life and education ==
William Adler, known as Bill, was born in Brooklyn, New York, on December 18, 1951. He moved with his family to Detroit before he was five, and he lived in Michigan until 1976. He attended the James Vernor elementary school through the ninth grade, and graduated from Southfield High School. He later matriculated briefly at the University of Michigan.

== Career ==
=== Detroit, Ann Arbor, and Boston ===
Adler's first exposure to the music business came in the fall of 1969, when he was hired in the record department of a university bookstore. In 1972, he started to host a weekly freeform radio show on WCBN-FM, the University of Michigan's student station. In the summer of 1973, he began working at radio station WDET-FM, Detroit, as the board operator (and occasional substitute host) for Kenny Cox, a local jazz pianist and bandleader who hosted a weekly show called "Kaleidophone." Later that year, Adler began a three-year stint as contributing music editor for the Ann Arbor Sun, a weekly underground newspaper edited by the poet and activist John Sinclair and published by David Fenton. A year later, Adler began reviewing records for Down Beat magazine. In the spring of 1975, Adler was briefly a deejay at WABX, Detroit, a pioneering free-form radio station.

Adler moved to Boston in February 1976. He deejayed at radio station WBCN-FM throughout the spring of 1977 and freelanced articles about music to the Real Paper and High Times. He was the staff pop music critic of the Boston Herald from April 1978 until April 1980.

=== New York – Def Jam, Eyejammie Fine Arts Gallery, and Mouth Almighty Records ===
Adler moved to New York in July 1980. For the next several years he worked as a freelance writer on musical subjects for publications including the Village Voice, Rolling Stone, People, and the Daily News. In 1984, Russell Simmons hired Adler as director of publicity for Rush Artist Management and Def Jam Recordings. During the next six years Adler worked closely with a variety of artists, including Run-DMC, Dr. Jeckyll & Mr. Hyde, the Beastie Boys, LL Cool J, Public Enemy, DJ Jazzy Jeff & the Fresh Prince and De La Soul.

Adler has written and taught extensively based on his experiences at Def Jam; in 1987, he wrote Tougher Than Leather: The Authorized Biography of Run-DMC (New American Library), described by the critic Harry Allen in the Village Voice as "hip-hop's first authorized biography and a definitive, insightful text." The critic Jon Caramanica, in a review for Rolling Stone of the 2002 reissue of the book, suggested it "might well be the most comprehensive biography ever written about a pop act while it was still in its prime." In the spring of 2006, Adler taught a course about Def Jam at New York University's Clive Davis Department of Recorded Music, and in 2011, Adler and Dan Charnas co-authored Def Jam Recordings: The First 25 Years of the Last Great Record Label, which was published in both English and French.(The French-language version was created by French journalist Olivier Cachin.)

In the fall of 2008, Adler and the artist Cey Adams co-edited DEFinition: the Art and Design of Hip-Hop (Collins Design), a book described by Adler himself as "a catalog for a [museum] exhibition that is waiting to happen." DEFinition was praised by the critic Cinque Hicks in Creative Loafing as "a voracious and wide-ranging visual survey that makes the case that hip-hop's musical heritage is only part of the story." In December 2020, a booklet by Adler entitled "Every Year Just 'Bout This Time, Kurtis Blow Celebrates with a Rhyme," was published by Music Arkives Ltd. This is an expanded version of an article published by the Smithsonian in December 2019 and pegged to the 40th anniversary of the release of Blow's "Christmas Rappin'" single. In the fall of 2023, an autobiographical comic book by Umar Bin Hassan of The Last Poets entitled "Up South in Akron, Summer 1959," was published by Music Arkives Ltd. Adler was its editor.

Adler was an early champion of hip-hop photography; in 1991, he wrote the text for "Rap: Portraits and Lyrics of a Generation of Black Rockers," which showcased the work of Janette Beckman. (The book was published by St. Martin's Press in America and Omnibus Press in England.) In 2003, he founded the Eyejammie Fine Arts Gallery, which was largely devoted to hip-hop photography. During the gallery's five years of existence, Adler curated or co-curated one-man shows showcasing the work of photographers Michael Benabib, Al Pereira, Ricky Powell, Ernie Paniccioli, Harry Allen, and others. Group shows celebrated Run-DMC, (Note: Entitled "It's Like That: 20 Years of RUN-DMC-JMJ," the show ran from October 17, 2003, through January 2, 2004.) women in hiphop, (Note: Entitled "Work It! Images of Women in Hip-Hop," the show ran from February 20 through March 27, 2004.) VP Records and dancehall reggae, (Note: The show was titled "Riddim Driven: A 25th Birthday Salute to VP Records and Dancehall Reggae." The exhibit ran from September 10 through November 1, 2004.)Southern hip-hop, (Note: Entitled "Adventures in the Dirty South", the show ran from September 15 through October 29, 2005.) and ego trip Magazine. (Note: Entitled "Made You Look ... Back: Ten Years of Ego Trip Photography," the show ran from July 16 through August 21, 2005.)

In 2004, Adler formed Eyejammie Press to publish "Frozade Moments", a book of postcards featuring the street photography of Ricky Powell. Gina Wang, writing for Mass Appeal magazine, praised the book as "a visual trip through a mismatched combination of celebs, knuckleheads, animals and NYC's indigenous subjects, all shot from Powell's gritty perspective."

Adler's essay, "Who Shot Ya: A History of Hip-Hop Photography" was commissioned by the journalist Jeff Chang and published in Chang's "Total Chaos: The Art and Aesthetics of Hip-Hop" (Basic Civitas 2006). It was later republished in Wax Poetics magazine. Adler wrote the text for Michael Benabib's "In Ya Grill: The Faces of Hip Hop", which was published by Billboard Books in 2007. Adler's essay, "Contact Sheets: Freedom of Choice," was commissioned by Vikki Tobak and published in Tobak's "Contact High: A Visual History of Hip-Hop" (Clarkson Potter 2018). His essay, "Looking at Music: The Art of the Album Cover" was included in “By the Skin of Our Teeth: The Art and Design of Morning Breath” by Jason Noto and Doug Cunningham, which was published by Dey Street Books in December 2017. He also wrote the foreword to Sophie Bramly's "Yo! The Early Days of Hip Hop 1982-84," published by Soul Jazz Books in 2022.

In 1994, Adler and the poet Bob Holman co-founded NuYo Records, a record label devoted to the spoken word. Initially distributed by BMG, this venture was revived as Mouth Almighty Records by Danny Goldberg when he became the president of Mercury Records in 1996. Over the course of the next three years the label released 18 titles, including recordings by the Last Poets, Allen Ginsberg, Michele Serros, and Sekou Sundiata, two CDs of short fiction from The New Yorker magazine, a two-CD set of readings of Edgar Allan Poe produced by Hal Willner, and the soundtrack to The United States of Poetry, a five-part PBS television special. In the summer of 1995, Adler and Holman and their associates on New York's spoken word scene were the subject of an article in The New Yorker by Henry Louis Gates Jr. In 1998, Adler founded Mouth Almighty Books to publish Beau Sia's "A Night Without Armor II: The Revenge," a parody of a book of poetry by Jewel entitled "A Night Without Armor."

=== Song production, Museum consultancies, Film production, Podcast ===
In 1987, Adler helped Run DMC write and produce its song "Christmas in Hollis." The details of that episode are spelled out by Joseph "Run" Simmons in ’'Jingle Bell Rocks!’', the award-winning 2014 documentary by Canadian filmmaker Mitchell Kezin.

Adler has consulted for several museums on the establishment of their hip-hop collections, including Seattle's Experience Music Project (known today as the Museum of Pop Culture), the Museum of Modern Art, and the Smithsonian Institution's National Museum of American History.

In collaboration with Hart and Dana Perry of Perry Films, Adler was the producer/writer of "And You Don't Stop: 30 Years of Hip-Hop," a five-part documentary film series that debuted on VH1 during the fall of 2004. Reviewing the series for The New York Times, television critic Virginia Heffernan wrote, "It may be the first monograph on this subject to position hip-hop confidently and specifically in the history of American music without having to make elementary arguments about its value or its significance."

In October 2024, Adler launched a podcast entitled "The Singer & the Song." It was inspired by his belief that "a singer or instrumentalist performing a song is like an actor bringing a script to life or a cook working from a recipe – every interpretation is going to have its own unpredictable flavor."

=== Collections ===
Adler's work as a hip-hop archivist commenced during his years at Rush/Def Jam. The Adler Hip-Hop Archive—which includes newspaper and magazine articles, publicity materials, press photos, advertisements, and posters—was acquired by Cornell University in 2013. In the wake of that sale, Adler began contributing a column entitled “Diggin’ in the Files” to the Crazy Hood Productions website, which was founded and run by DJ EFN, the notable and prolific Miami-based producer, documentarian, and entrepreneur. Focusing on a series of important rappers, each article resurrected examples of the impactful press they had generated, variously published in mainstream media, music trade press, and independent hip-hop-centric outlets. The series ran for several years.

In September 2015, the Eyejammie Hip-Hop Photo Collection, assembled by Adler, was acquired by the Smithsonian Institution's National Museum of African-American History and Culture.

In June 2021, Adler donated his collection of underground comix to the Rhode Island School of Design.

Adler is featured in Dust & Grooves: Adventures in Record Collecting (2014), a book published by photographer Eilon Paz.
