= Cey Adams =

American visual artist

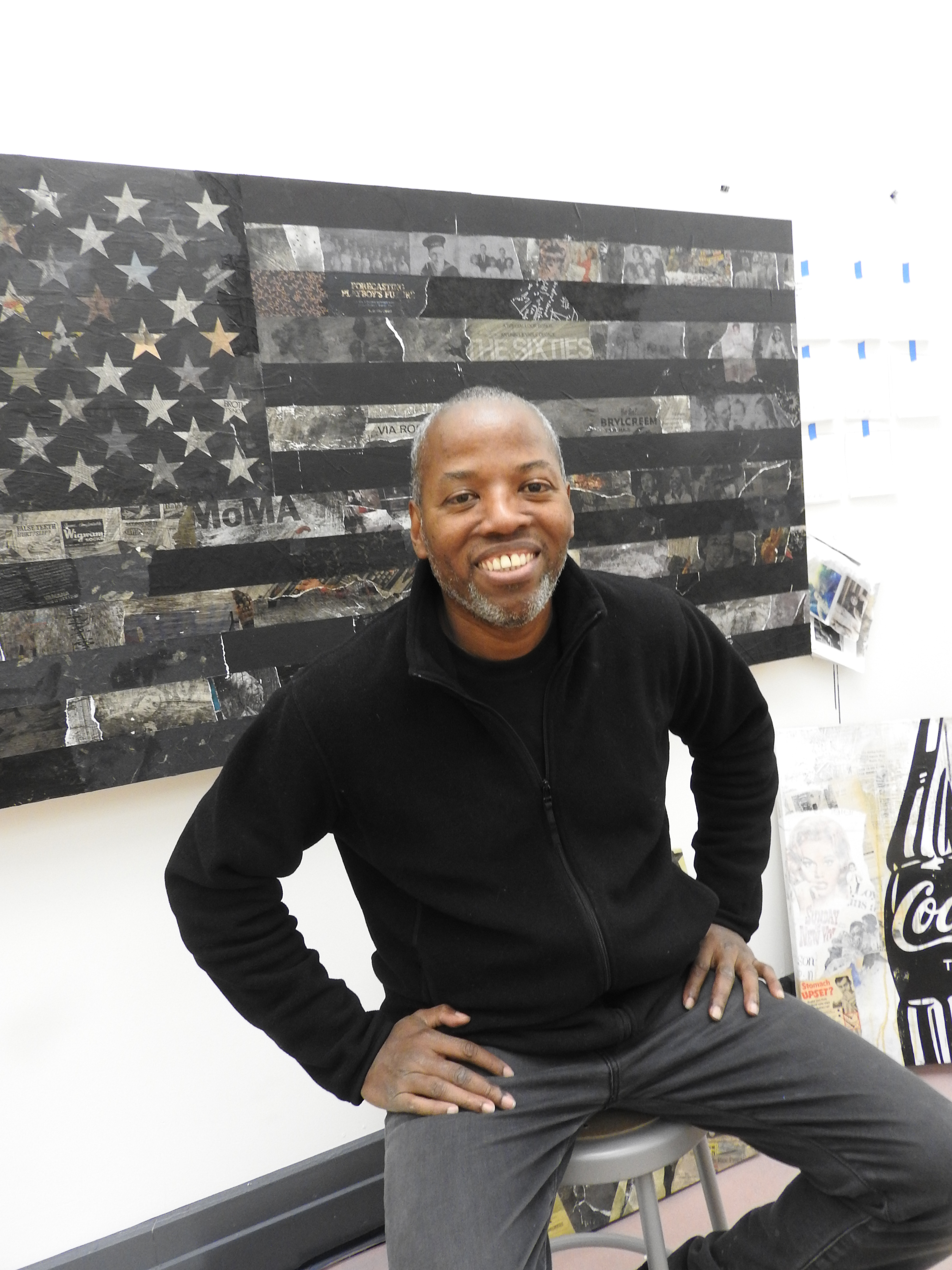
- Adams in 2018
- Born: 1962 (age 63–64); New York, United States
- Occupations: Visual artist, graphic designer, author
- Website: http://ceyadams.com/

Cey Adams (born 1962) is an American visual artist, graphic designer and author. He was the founding creative director of Def Jam Recordings and is known for his work with Beastie Boys, Public Enemy, LL Cool J, Jay-Z, and Mary J. Blige. He has been described as "legendary" for his work in hip-hop graphic design.

== Biography ==
Adams was a graffiti artist in the late 1970s and early 1980s. He studied painting at New York's School of Visual Arts and ultimately had work exhibited in the city alongside Jean Michel Basquiat and Keith Haring. As a 19-year-old, he was represented by Graffiti Above Ground gallery, a gallery featuring prominent graffiti artists. In 1982 he appeared in the historic PBS documentary Style Wars about subway graffiti in New York.

Cey Adams met Adam Horovitz in 1983; a close relationship with the Beastie Boys began with Adams designing the graffiti lettering that spelled out the name of the band on the cover of their 12" single for Cooky Puss. Around the same time, he began working with Russell Simmons' Rush Artist Management creating logos, tour merchandising, billboards, and advertising campaigns for rap artists including Beastie Boys, Run DMC, De La Soul, and LL Cool J.

In the late 1980s, Adams and his partner Steve Carr co-founded the Drawing Board, Def Jam Recording's in-house visual design firm overseeing the visual style of Def Jam's artists as well as artists signed to MCA, Universal, Warner Bros., Bad Boy and BMG.

The Drawing Board closed in 1999 and Adams began working on corporate advertising campaigns for companies such as Levi's, Nike, HBO, Coca-Cola, Burton Snowboards, Moët & Chandon, Comedy Central, HBO, and Warner Bros.

== After Def Jam ==
Adams continued designing branding and logos. He worked with companies such as Revolver Films and Asylum Records, and music artists as diverse as Foo Fighters, Don Henley, and Mary J. Blige.

From 1999 to 2000, Adams worked as a creative director for Urban Magic, an internet startup founded by Magic Johnson and Starbucks chairman Howard Schultz.

In 2000, he co-designed the hip-hop wing of Seattle's Experience Music Project. In 2001, Dave Chappelle hired Adams to create the logo for his new sketch comedy show, "Chappelle's Show" on Comedy Central.

Having previously designed clothes for Run DMC for Adidas, in 2006, he was commissioned to design his own custom track suits and sneakers featuring Beastie Boys. In 2007, he created a limited edition collection for Muhammad Ali for Adidas. The shoes were included as part of "The Rise of Sneaker Culture" exhibit at the Brooklyn Museum of Art in New York.

In 2008, Adams co-edited "DEFinition: the Art and Design of Hip-Hop", published by HarperCollins, with the music journalist Bill Adler, who had been Def Jam's original publicist.

Adams was invited to participate in Looking at Music 3.0 at the Museum of Modern Art in New York in 2011. It was the third in a series of exhibitions exploring the influence of music on contemporary art practices, focusing on New York in the 1980s and 1990s. He also designed a poster for the event.

That same year, Rizzoli published "Def Jam Recordings: The First 25 Years of the Last Great Record Label" Adams designed the book and CD box collection for this "comprehensive coffee table book that compiled over two decades of photos, album artwork, and stories behind every record released under the label." Also in 2011, he designed Tommy Boy Records' 30th anniversary poster.

In celebration of Martin Luther King Day in 2013, Adams was commissioned by The Juilliard School to paint a large scale mural titled "Dream," a powerful portrait of Dr. King and a visual timeline of the Civil Rights Movement. He also worked with Brooklyn Academy of Music on "Picture the Dream," a community-based creative workshop which teaches young people the value of making art while educating them about Dr. King's message of equality through non-violence.

Adams took a two-month residency at the Bemis Center for Contemporary Arts in Omaha, Nebraska, in 2014, during which time he also created a mural with local teenagers, with the message "Love", and in an interview with the Omaha World Herald talks about developing his new series of artworks referencing classic corporate logos. In his recent artworks, Adams employs mixed media including hand-made papers and magazine clippings on canvas, and silk screening.

In March 2015, a new body of collage work incorporating the corporate logos was exhibited at Rush Philanthropic Arts Foundation, an organization "dedicated to providing inner city youth across New York City with significant exposure to the arts." It was founded in 1995 by Russell Simmons. The Foundation writes that Adams "draws inspiration from 60s pop art, sign painting, comic books, and popular culture. His work focuses on themes including pop culture, race and gender relations, cultural and community issues. Trusted Brands transforms images and icographics that he grew up with." Adams describes the Trusted Brands series as "an homage to pop art." In an interview with NY1, the director of Rush Art Galleries speaks about Adam's positive influence and advocacy for emerging artists.

Adams took part in "Red Eye," an annual weeks-long exhibition of art and entertainment in Fort Lauderdale, in July 2015. He collaborated with local students, helping them create a mural for the National Urban League conference, as well as teaching, and lecturing.

The Smithsonian's National Museum of African American History and Culture opened in September 2016 and Adams contributed a wall mural for the opening festival "Freedom Sounds: A Community Celebration.” Adams also designed a coffee table book published by the Smithsonian that is a 300-page anthology of Hip-Hop that includes a box set of CDs and never-before-seen photographs.

Beyond Walls is a group of Lynn, Massachusetts residents, business owners, and public art and place-making enthusiasts attempting to create a sense of "place and safety" in Downtown Lynn. Adams completed a mural for this project in July 2017.

Adams was the Brooklyn Arts Council's 2015 50th Anniversary Gala Honoree.

Honoring the 44th anniversary of the birth of Hop Hip on August 11, 2017, Google launched a "first-of-its-kind Doodle featuring a custom logo graphic by famed graffiti artist Cey Adams, interactive turntables on which users can mix samples from legendary tracks, and a serving of Hip Hop history – with an emphasis on its founding pioneers."

In collaboration with photographer Janette Beckman, Adams worked on a project called the "Mash Up" where graffiti artists "remixed" Beckman's photographs of hip hop musicians, that was released as a book in 2018.

For the launch of Levi's new store in Times Square in November 2018, Adams screen-printed and airbrushed clothing. The pieces are an homage to time doing graffiti, when he would hand paint designs on vintage Levi's apparel for family and friends.

Adams was commissioned by Pabst Brewing Company in 2019 to reimagine their Pabst Blue Ribbon logo. His design was placed on 150 million cans that were distributed nationally.

Departure: 40 Years of Art & Design, was debuted in 2022 at Stone Gallery at Boston University. This is his retrospective exhibition, featuring work from throughout his lifetime.
