= Contact high (disambiguation) =

A contact high is a psychological phenomenon.

Contact High may also refer to:

- Contact High (film), a 2009 Austrian film
- Contact High: A Visual History of Hip-Hop, a 2018 book

in music:

- Contact High, a 2001 album by Rocket Science
- Contact High with the Godz, an album by The Godz
- "Contact High", a song by Allen Stone from his self-titled 2012 album
- "Contact High", a song by Architecture in Helsinki from their 2011 album Moment Bends
- "Contact High", a song by Brad Paisley from his 2017 album Love and War
- "Contact High", a song by Ike & Tina Turner
- "Contact High", a song by Scissor Sisters
- "Contact High", a song by The Soup Dragons from their album Hydrophonic
