= Van Taylor Monroe III =

American artist

- Born: Cleveland, Ohio
- Known for: Custom Hand-Painted Sneakers
- Notable work: Obama 08 Sneakers
- Website: http://www.vanmonroe.com/

Van Taylor Monroe III (also known as Van Monroe) is an African-American artist best known for his custom, hand-painted sneakers. His most notable work, the Obama '08 sneakers, were requested by the Smithsonian Institution for inclusion in the National Museum of African American History and Culture. He has a long list of celebrity clients and frequently creates works to market major Hollywood films.

== Biography ==
Monroe was born and raised in Cleveland, Ohio, and attended Miami University in Ohio where he studied graphic design before changing his major to psychology. Monroe began painting sneakers in 2003 while at college, both for himself and his fellow football teammates. After graduating, Monroe worked as a market manager for Sherwin Williams, then worked as a broker for a logistics firm before leaving that job in 2007 to pursue an art career.

In 2018, Monroe spent a summer residency as featured artist for the Cleveland Museum of Art's mobile art studio, Studio Go. He has also traveled to Africa to teach painting at Academie des Beaux-Arts in Kinshasa, DRC.

== Career ==
His work "Obama ’08", a hand-painted pair of Nike sneakers featuring former President Barack Obama's portrait alongside quotes from the former president, went viral on MySpace in 2008. He later gifted these sneakers to the Smithsonian, where they currently are featured in the National Museum of African American History and Culture in Washington, DC. He has since been commissioned by other notable figures, including Valérie Trierweiler, Spike Lee, Afeni Shakur, Will.i.am, Hill Harper, Queen Latifah, Nicki Minaj, Ray Romano, Tiësto, Jennifer Lopez, Carmelo and LaLa Anthony, and Josh Hutcherson.

Monroe has been hired by major film companies to create custom sneakers to help market Hollywood films including, Ice Age: Continental Drift and X-Men Origins: Wolverine.

He is currently based out of his hometown of Cleveland, Ohio where he runs VTM Creative, an advertising and branding company.

== Notable artworks ==
=== Obama '08 ===
His most notable artwork, Obama '08 is a set of custom Nike Air Force 1s that he has hand painted with the likeness of Barack Obama and the words "CHANGE" and "YES WE CAN" on each shoe. Monroe has stated he became inspired after watching Obama's speeches after winning the Iowa Caucus during the first run of his presidency.

=== What Is That in Thine Hand? ===
Monroe painted a large-scale mural featuring two African-American children on the wall of St. Adalbert Catholic School, in Cleveland, Ohio in 2011. Monroe has said the inspiration for this mural came from a passage from the bible, Exod 4:2, which is featured at the bottom of the mural. This mural is one of eight murals from the "Community Mural Project" by the Cleveland Foundation.

== Collections ==
His sneakers, "Obama '08" are in the permanent collection of the Smithsonian National Museum of African American History and Culture (NMAAHC) in Washington, DC. His work has also been featured in the Manifest Hope Gallery, which was housed within the Andenken Gallery, in Denver, Colorado.

== Bibliography ==
- Florino, Rick. Van Taylor Monroe, Simon Media Corporation, 30 Nov. -1, digitaledition.qwinc.com/display_article.php?id=135027&view=14732.
- Kurin, Richard. The Smithsonian's History of America in 101 Objects. United States, Penguin Publishing Group, 2013.
- McAllister, Brian. Roadmap: The Get-It-Together Guide for Figuring Out What to Do with Your Life. United States, Chronicle Books LLC, 2015.
- “Shoes for Obama.” National Museum of African American History and Culture, 8 Feb. 2018, nmaahc.si.edu/blog-post/shoes-obama.
