= Substance intoxication =

- Specialty: Psychiatry, narcology, addiction medicine

Substance intoxication is a transient condition of altered consciousness and behavior associated with recent use of a substance. It is often maladaptive and impairing, but reversible. If the symptoms are severe, the term "substance intoxication delirium" may be used. Slang terms for the state include: getting high (generic), and being stoned, cooked, or fried (usually in reference to cannabis).

Substance intoxication may often accompany a substance use disorder (SUD); if persistent substance-related problems exist, SUD is the preferred diagnosis.

The term "intoxication" in common use most often refers to alcohol intoxication, or drug addiction usually opioids consisting of an overdose; resulting in death.

== Classification ==
The ICD-10 Mental and Behavioural Disorders due to psychoactive substance use shows:

- F10. alcohol
- F11. opioids
- F12. cannabinoids
- F13. sedatives and hypnotics
- F14. cocaine
- F15. amphetamines, caffeine, or other stimulants
- F16. hallucinogens
- F17. tobacco
- F18. volatile solvent
- F19. multiple drug use and use of other psychoactive substances

== Forms of intoxication ==
=== Caffeine ===
The discussion over whether the coffee (caffeine) "buzz" counted as intoxication or not was hotly debated during the early to mid-16th century. In human toxicology, blood caffeine concentrations of around 80–100 mg/L have been reported in fatal cases and are generally regarded as lethal.

== Contact high ==
Contact high is a phenomenon that occurs in otherwise sober people who experience a drug-like effect just by coming into contact with someone who is under the influence of a psychoactive drug. In a similar way to the placebo effect, a contact high may be caused by classical conditioning as well as by the physical and social setting.

The term is often incorrectly used to describe the high obtained from passive inhalation of marijuana.

== Slang terms ==
Slang terms include: getting high (generic), being stoned, cooked, or blazed (usually in reference to cannabis), and many more specific slang terms for particular intoxicants. Alcohol intoxication is graded in intensity from buzzed, to tipsy then drunk all the way up to hammered, plastered, smashed, wasted, destroyed, shitfaced and a number of other terms. The term rolling is a common word used to describe being under the influence of MDMA and for LSD the phrases frying or tripping have been used. "Tripping" is a term that is considered applicable to virtually all hallucinogens which includes psychedelics, dissociatives, deliriants and possibly certain types of hypnotics.

== See also ==
- "The spins", a state of dizziness and disorientation due to intoxication
- Toxicity
- Toxidrome
- List of deaths from drug overdose and intoxication
