= Hip Hop Smithsonian =

The Hip Hop Smithsonian is a compilation of photographs of hip hop artists collected by Bill Adler. These photos represent the diversity of the hip hop culture and depicts the community that it brings forward. It includes artists such as Tupac, Mary J. Blige, Run DMC, and many more. The collection was later moved to the Smithsonian's National Museum of African American History, which is where the name "Hip Hop Smithsonian" comes from (Nodijimbadem).

== Origin of the Collection ==
Over four hundred photos have been collected from the 1980s all the way up to 2004. It started as the Eyejammie Hip-Hop Photo Collection by Bill Adler and was displayed at the Eyejammie Fine Arts Gallery in New York City in 2007 (Gonzales). The collection was later acquired by the Smithsonian Museum after being displayed at various galleries. This collection shows the transition of hip hop culture over time and the community that they had with one another. Also, the photographs come from over fifty photographers which shows the different perspectives different people had on the hip hop community. The photos includes Big Daddy Kane, getting a hair cut from a barber, an artist on the set of a music video, Mary J Blige at an after party after a music awards, and fans during a live concert (Eyejammie Hip Hop Photo Collection).

== Hip-Hop Exhibit at Smithsonian ==
The National Museum of American History introduced the artifact gathering initiative during the event in February in New York City, which was attended by notable figures such music mogul Ice-T, producer Russell Simmons, break dancer Crazy Legs, and hip-hop pioneer Africa Bambaataa. With that being said, this occasion is where early members of all hip-hop communities have come to present mementos during a particular ceremony. A multi-year initiative at the museum will compare where it started in the 1970s to where it is now. A more recent study found that more than 24 million Americans, ages 15 to 29, were customers worth $500 billion just one year ago and were familiar with hip hop culture.

== Contents of the Photos ==
The photos ranged anywhere from casual to fancy because it captured artists at all aspects of their lives. The hip hop era changed through those two decades in clothes, parties, and the amount of socializing they did. Back in the early days, the artists were connected with one another and had a sense of community within each other. The helped each other rise and be successful in the industry, as well as came together to at social events. The Hip Hop Smithsonian was a way for the community to understand the history hip hop as well as see how the dynamic has transitioned over time.
