= Tourmobile =

Landmark Services Tourmobile, Inc.
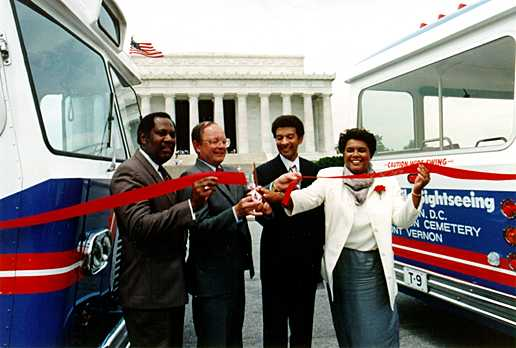
- Robert G. Stanton, National Capital Region, James M. Ridenour, Director, NPS, Mr. Tom Mack and Ms. Phyllis Tate in 1989. At the 20th Anniversary of the Tourmobile service in front of the Lincoln Memorial.
- Industry: Tourism and transportation
- Fate: Contract terminated by National Park Service
- Headquarters: Washington DC
- Number of employees: 130 (1996)

Tourmobile was a sightseeing company that operated in Washington DC from 1969 until 2011. The company was founded as a subsidiary of Universal Studios with three buses and grew to become an independent company carrying more than 700,000 passengers per year at $32 per ticket on its fleet of 45 vehicles. Passengers were able to board and alight as often as they liked on the day in which a ticket was purchased. Tourmobile operated a legal monopoly for guided tours of the National Mall and Arlington National Cemetery, which prevented the DC Circulator, Capital Bikeshare, WMATA, and other organizations from providing services in highly-traveled parts of the city. This monopoly was highly controversial from the start. The National Park Service received an estimated $330,000 per year from the arrangement. After the termination of the Tourmobile contract, companies including Gray Line Worldwide and Open Top Sightseeing began providing National Mall tours. The company's fleet consisted of a distinctive style of bus, the newest of which was manufactured in 1976.

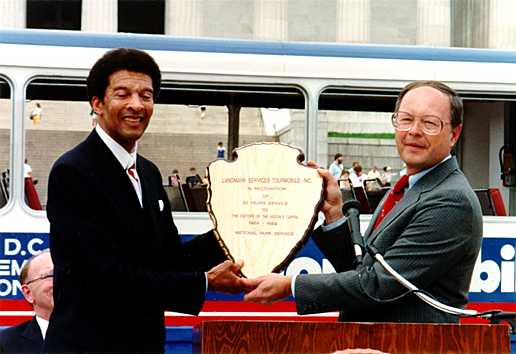
Mr. Tom Mack of Landmark Services Tourmobile, Inc., being presented with a plaque indicating 20 years of Service by Mr. James M. Ridenour, Director of the National Park Service.
