= National Museum of African American History and Culture =

Museum in Washington, DC

NMAAHC

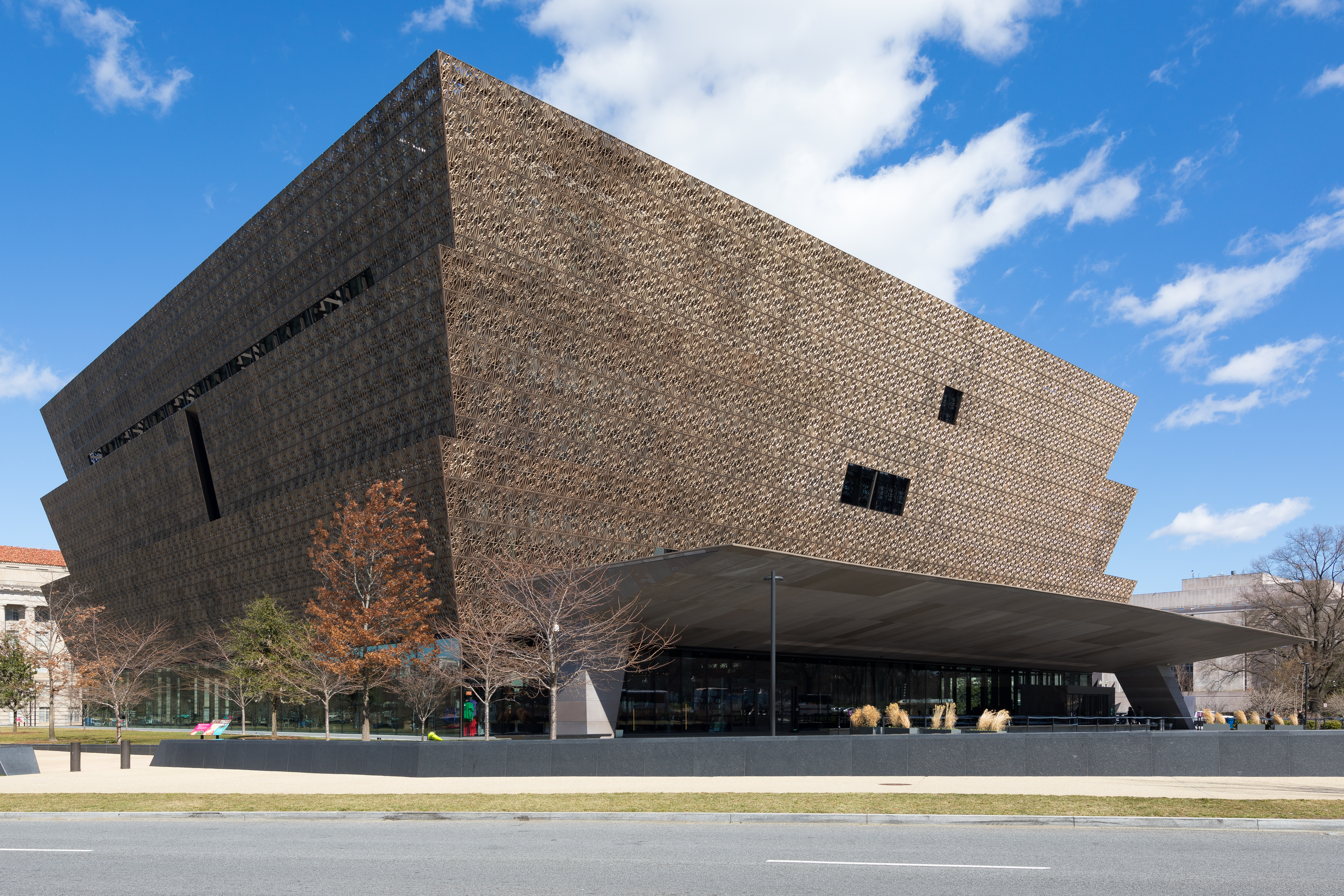
- Exterior of the National Museum of African American History and Culture in 2020

- Location in Washington, D.C.
- Established: December 16, 2003 (establishment); September 24, 2016 (building dedication on The Mall)
- Location: 1400 Constitution Ave, NW Washington, DC 20560
- Coordinates: 38°53′28″N 77°01′58″W
- Type: History museum
- Collections: African-American history, art, music
- Collection size: 40,000 (approximate)
- Visitors: 1,092,552 (2022)
- Director: Kevin Young
- Curator: Jacquelyn Serwer
- Architect: Freelon Group/Adjaye Associates/Davis Brody Bond
- Public transit access: Washington Metro at Smithsonian or Federal Triangle
- Website: nmaahc.si.edu

The National Museum of African American History and Culture (NMAAHC), colloquially known as the Blacksonian, is a Smithsonian Institution museum located on the National Mall in Washington, D.C., in the United States. It was established in 2003 and opened its permanent home in 2016 with a ceremony led by President Barack Obama.

Early efforts to establish a federally owned museum featuring African-American history and culture can be traced to 1915 and the National Memorial Association, although the modern push for such an organization did not begin until the 1970s. After years of little success, a legislative push began in 1988 that led to authorization of the museum in 2003. A site was selected in 2006, and a design submitted by Freelon Group/Adjaye Associates/Davis Brody Bond was chosen in 2009. Construction began in 2012 and was completed in 2016.

The NMAAHC is the world's largest museum dedicated to African-American history and culture. In 2022 it welcomed 1,092,552 visitors, and was the second–most visited Smithsonian Museum and eighth–most visited museum in the United States. The museum has more than 40,000 objects in its collection, although only about 3,500 items are on display. The 350,000-square-foot (33,000 m^{2}), 10-story building (five above and five below ground) and its exhibits have won critical praise.

== History ==
=== Early efforts ===
The concept of a national museum dedicated to African-American history and culture can be traced back to the second decade of the 20th century. In 1915, African-American veterans of the Union Army met at the Nineteenth Street Baptist Church in Washington, D.C., for a reunion and parade. Frustrated with the racial discrimination they still faced, the veterans formed a committee to build a memorial to various African-American achievements. Their efforts paid off in 1929, when President Herbert Hoover appointed Mary Church Terrell, Mary McLeod Bethune, and 10 others to a commission charged with building a "National Memorial Building" showcasing African-American achievements in the arts and sciences. But Congress did not back the project, and private fundraising also failed. Although proposals for an African-American history and culture museum would be floated in Congress for the next 40 years, none gained more than minimal support.

Proposals for a museum began circulating again in Congress in the early 1970s. In 1981, Congress approved a federal charter for a National Afro-American Museum in Wilberforce, Ohio. The museum, built and funded with private money, opened in 1987. In the early 1980s, Tom Mack (the African-American chairman of Tourmobile, a tourist bus company) founded the National Council of Education and Economic Development (NCEED). Mack's intention was to use the non-profit group to advance his ideas about economic development, education, and the arts in the black community. Emboldened by Congress's action in 1981, Mack began using the NCEED to press for a stand-alone African-American museum in D.C. in 1985. Mack did not collaborate with other black-led cultural foundations that were working to improve the representation of African Americans by Smithsonian and other federal institutions. Mack contacted Representative Mickey Leland about his idea for a national museum focusing on African Americans, and won his support for federal legislation in 1985. Leland sponsored a non-binding resolution (H.R. 666) advocating an African-American museum on the National Mall, which passed the House of Representatives in 1986. The congressional attention motivated the Smithsonian to improve its presentation of African-American history. In 1987, the National Museum of American History sponsored a major exhibit, "Field to Factory", which focused on the black diaspora out of the Deep South in the 1950s.

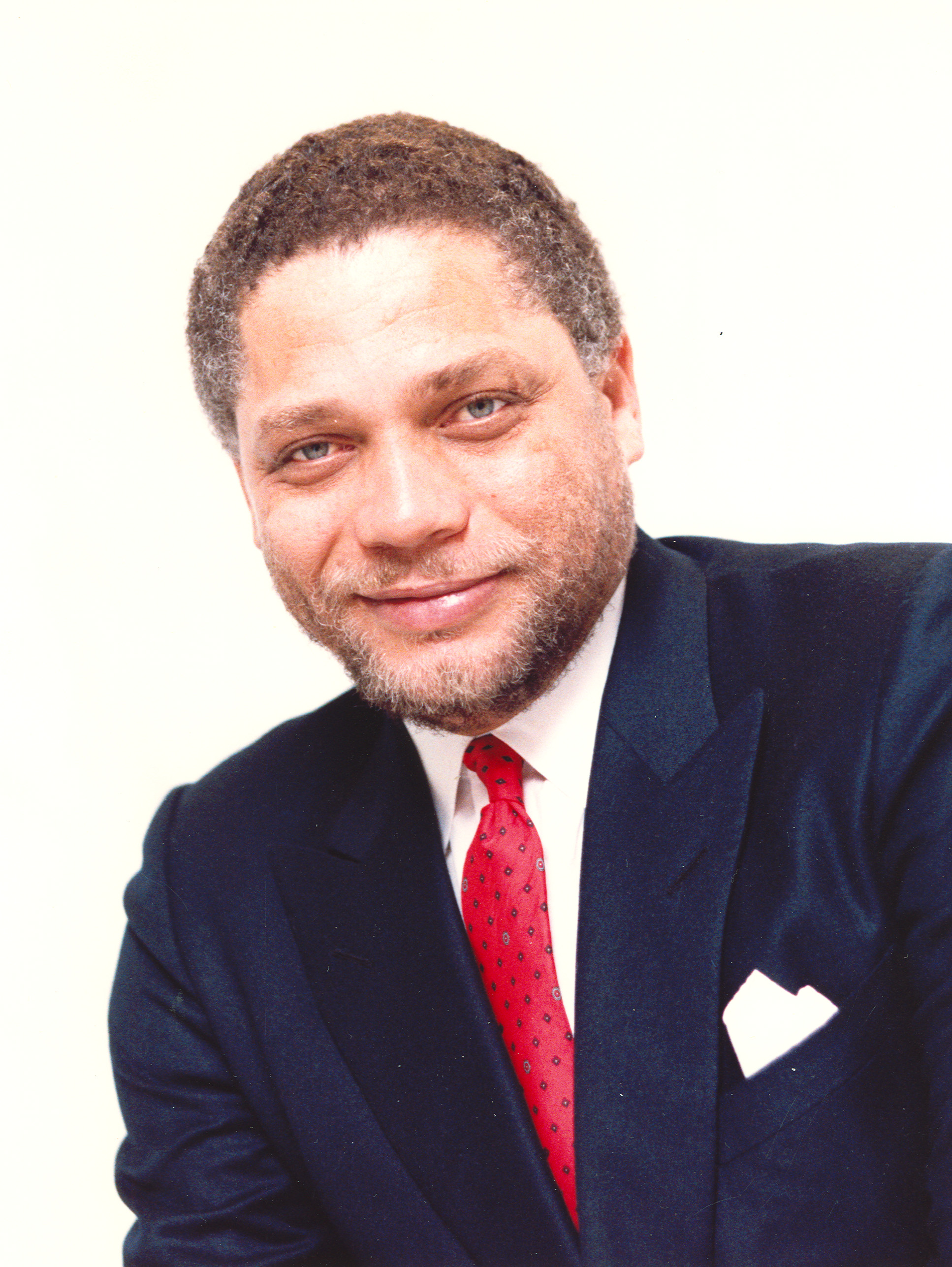
Rep. Mickey Leland, an early supporter of federal legislation for a black history museum

"Field to Factory" encouraged Mack to continue pursuing a museum. In 1987 and 1988, NCEED began lining up support among black members of Congress for legislation that would establish an independent African-American national history museum in Washington, D.C. But NCEED ran into opposition from the African American Museum Association (AAMA), an umbrella group that represented small local African-American art, cultural, and history museums across the United States. John Kinard, president of the AAMA and co-founder of the Anacostia Community Museum (which became part of the Smithsonian in 1967), opposed NCEED's effort. Kinard argued that a national museum would consume donor dollars and out-bid local museums for artifacts and trained staff. Kinard and the AAMA instead advocated that Congress establish a $50 million fund to create a national foundation to support local black history museums as a means of mitigating these problems. Others, pointing to the Smithsonian's long history of discrimination against black employees, (Note: As late as 1989, the Smithsonian was still refusing to hire blacks for important jobs as curators, researchers, and restorers.) questioned whether the white-dominated Smithsonian could properly administer an African-American history museum. (Note: A 1989 internal report by the Smithsonian's cultural equity committee released in January 1989 bluntly observed that the Smithsonian had a "shocking absence of minorities in senior-level administrative and professional positions.") Lastly, many local African-American museums worried that they would be forced to become adjuncts of the proposed Smithsonian museum. These institutions had fought for decades for political, financial, and academic independence from white-dominated, sometimes racist local governments. Now they feared losing that hard-won independence.

In 1988, Rep. John Lewis and Rep. Leland introduced legislation for a stand-alone African-American history museum within the Smithsonian Institution. But the bill faced significant opposition in Congress due to its cost. Supporters of the African-American museum tried to salvage the proposal by suggesting that the Native Indian museum (then moving through Congress) and African-American museum share the same space. But the compromise did not work and the bill died.

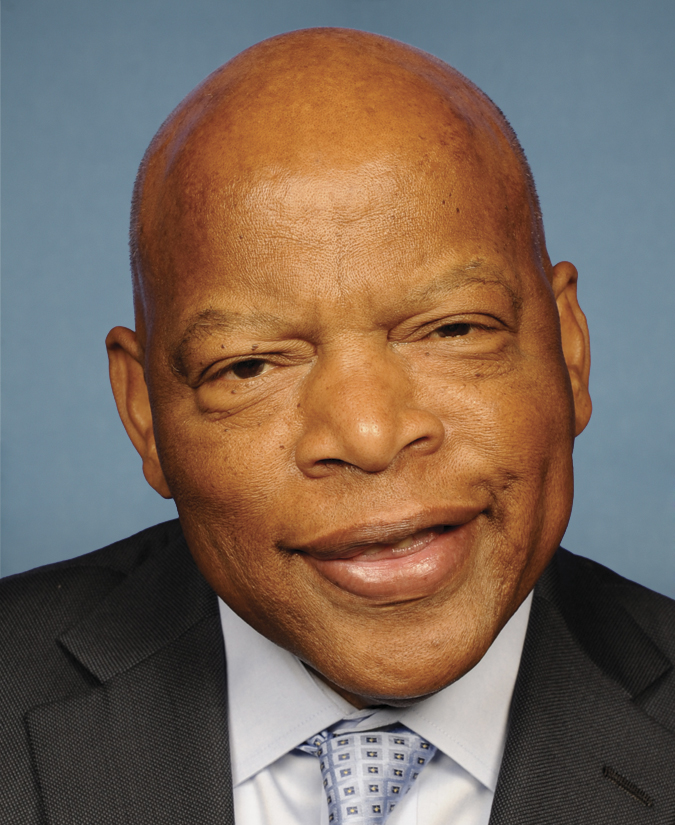
Rep. John Lewis, who championed the legislation for the museum after Rep. Leland's death in a plane crash in 1989

Lewis and Leland introduced another bill in 1989. Once more, cost considerations killed the bill. The Smithsonian Institution, however, was moving toward support for a museum. In 1988, an ad hoc group of African-American scholars—most from within the Smithsonian, but some from other museums as well—began debating what an African-American history museum might look like. While the group discussed the issue informally, Smithsonian Secretary Robert McCormick Adams, Jr. (Note: The Secretary is the highest-ranking official at the Smithsonian.) publicly suggested in October 1989 that "just a wing" of the National Museum of American History should be devoted to black culture, a pronouncement that generated extensive controversy. The discussions by the ad hoc group prompted the Smithsonian to take a more formal approach to the idea of an African-American heritage museum. In December 1989 the Smithsonian hired nationally respected museum administrator Claudine Brown (Note: Brown was assistant director for government and community relations at the Brooklyn Museum in New York City.) to conduct a formal study of the museum issue.

Brown's group reported six months later that the Smithsonian should form a high-level advisory board to conduct a more thorough study of the issue. The Brown study was blunt in its discussion of the divisions within the African-American community about the advisability of a stand-alone national museum of African-American culture and history, but also forceful in its advocacy of a national museum of national prominence and national visibility with a broad mandate to document the vast sweep of the African-American experience in the United States. The study was also highly critical of the Smithsonian's ability to adequately represent African-American culture and history within an existing institution, and its willingness to appoint African-American staff to high-ranking positions within the museum.

The Smithsonian formed a 22-member advisory board, chaired by Mary Schmidt Campbell, (Note: At the time, Campbell was the commissioner of cultural affairs for New York City, and the highest-ranking African-American public arts administrator in the United States.) in May 1990. The creation of the advisory board was an important step for the Smithsonian. There were many on the Smithsonian's Board of Regents who believed that "African-American culture and history" was indefinable and that not enough artifacts and art of national significance could be found to build a museum. On May 6, 1991, after a year of study, the advisory board issued a report in favor of a national museum, and the Smithsonian Board of Regents voted unanimously to support the idea. However, the proposal the regents adopted only called not for a stand-alone institution but a "museum" housed in the East Hall of the existing Arts and Industries Building. The regents also agreed to keep the Anacostia Community Museum a separate facility; to give the new museum its own governing board, independent of existing museums; and to support the proposal for a grant-making program to help local African-American museums build their collections and train their staff. The regents also approved a "collections identification project" to identify donors who might be willing to donate, sell, or loan their items to the proposed new Smithsonian museum.

=== 1990s efforts ===
The Smithsonian Board of Regents agreed in September 1991 to draft museum legislation, and submitted their bill to Congress in February 1992. The bill was criticized by Tom Mack and others for putting the museum in a building that was too small and old to properly house the intended collection, and despite winning approval in both House and Senate committees the bill died once more. In 1994, Senator Jesse Helms refused to allow the legislation to come to the Senate floor (voicing both fiscal and philosophical concerns) despite bipartisan support.

In 1995, citing funding issues, the Smithsonian abandoned its support for a new museum and instead proposed a new Center for African American History and Culture within organization. The Smithsonian's new Secretary, Ira Michael Heyman, openly questioned the need for "ethnic" museums on the National Mall. Many, including Mary Campbell Schmidt, saw this as a step backward, a characterization Smithsonian officials strongly disputed. To demonstrate its support for African-American history preservation, the Smithsonian held a fundraiser in March 1998 for the new center which raised $100,000 (~$183,994 in 2025). (Note: The new center was housed at the Anacostia Community Museum.)

Heymann left the Smithsonian in January 1999. In the meantime, other cities moved forward with major new African-American museums. The city of Detroit opened a $38.4 million, 120,000 sq ft (11,000 m^{2}) Museum of African-American History in 1997, and the city of Cincinnati was raising funds for a $90 million, 157,000 sq ft (14,600 m^{2}) National Underground Railroad Freedom Center (which broke ground in 2002). In 2000, a private group—upset with congressional delays—proposed constructing a $40 million (~$71 million in 2025), 400,000 sq ft (37,000 m^{2}) museum on Poplar Point, a site on the Anacostia River across from the Washington Navy Yard.

=== Passage of federal legislation ===
National Museum of African American History and Culture Act
- Long title: An Act to establish within the Smithsonian Institution the National Museum of African American History and Culture, and for other purposes.
- Enacted by: the 108th United States Congress
- Effective: December 16, 2003

Citations
- Public law: Pub. L. 108–184 (text) (PDF)
- Statutes at Large: 117 Stat. 2676

Codification
- Titles amended: Title 20—Education
- U.S.C. sections created: 20 U.S.C. §§ 80r–80r-9

Legislative history
- Introduced in the House as H.R. 3491 by John Lewis (D–GA) on November 17, 2003; Passed the House on November 19, 2003 (409–9); Passed the Senate on November 20, 2003 (unanimous consent); Signed into law by President George W. Bush on December 16, 2003

In 2001, Lewis and Representative J. C. Watts re-introduced legislation for a museum in the House of Representatives. Under the leadership of its new Secretary, Lawrence M. Small, the Smithsonian Board of Regents reversed course yet again in June 2001 and agreed to support a stand-alone National Museum of African American History and Culture. The Smithsonian asked Congress to establish a federally funded study commission. Congress swiftly agreed, and on December 29, President George W. Bush signed legislation establishing a 23-member commission to study the need for a museum, how to raise the funds to build and support it, and where it should be located. At the signing ceremony, the president expressed his opinion that the museum should be located on the National Mall.

The study commission's work took nearly two years, not the anticipated nine months. In November 2002, in anticipation of a positive outcome, the insurance company AFLAC donated $1 million (~$1.71 million in 2025) to help build the museum. On April 3, 2003, the study commission released its final report. As expected, the commission said a museum was needed, and recommended an extremely high-level site: A plot of land adjacent to the Capitol Reflecting Pool, bounded by Pennsylvania and Constitution Avenues NW and 1st and 3rd Streets NW. The commission ruled out establishing the museum within the Arts & Industries Building, concluding renovations to the structure would be too costly. It considered a site just west of the National Museum of American History and a site on the southwest Washington waterfront, but rejected both. The commission considered whether the museum should have an independent board of trustees (similar to that of the United States Holocaust Memorial Museum) or a board answerable both to the Smithsonian and independent trustees (similar to that of the National Gallery of Art), but rejected these approaches in favor of a board appointed by and answerable only to the Smithsonian Board of Regents. The commission proposed a 350,000 square-foot museum that would cost $360 million to build. Half the construction funds would come from private money, half from the federal government. Legislation to implement the commission's report was sponsored in the Senate by Sam Brownback and in the House by John Lewis.

As Congress considered the legislation, the museum's location became the major sticking point. Various members of the public, Congress, and advocacy groups felt the Capitol Hill site was too prominent and made the National Mall look crowded. Alternative proposed sites included the Liberty Loan Federal Building at 401 14th Street SW and Benjamin Banneker Park at the southern end of L'Enfant Promenade. This controversy threatened to kill the legislation. To save the bill, backers of the museum said in mid-November 2003 that they would abandon their push for the Capitol Hill site. The compromise saved the legislation: The House passed the National Museum of African American History and Culture Act on November 19, and the Senate followed suit two days later. President George W. Bush signed the bill into law on December 16. The legislation appropriated $17 million for museum planning and a site selection process, and $15 million for educational programs. The educational programs included grants to African-American museums to help them improve their operations and collections; grants to African-American museums for internships and fellowships; scholarships for individuals pursuing careers African-American studies; grants to promote the study of modern-day slavery throughout the world; and grants to help African-American museums build their endowments. The legislation established a committee to select a site, and required it to report its recommendation within 12 months. The site selection committee was limited to studying four sites: The site just west of the National Museum of American History, the Liberty Loan Federal Building site, Banneker Park, and the Arts and Industries Building.

== Siting and design competition ==
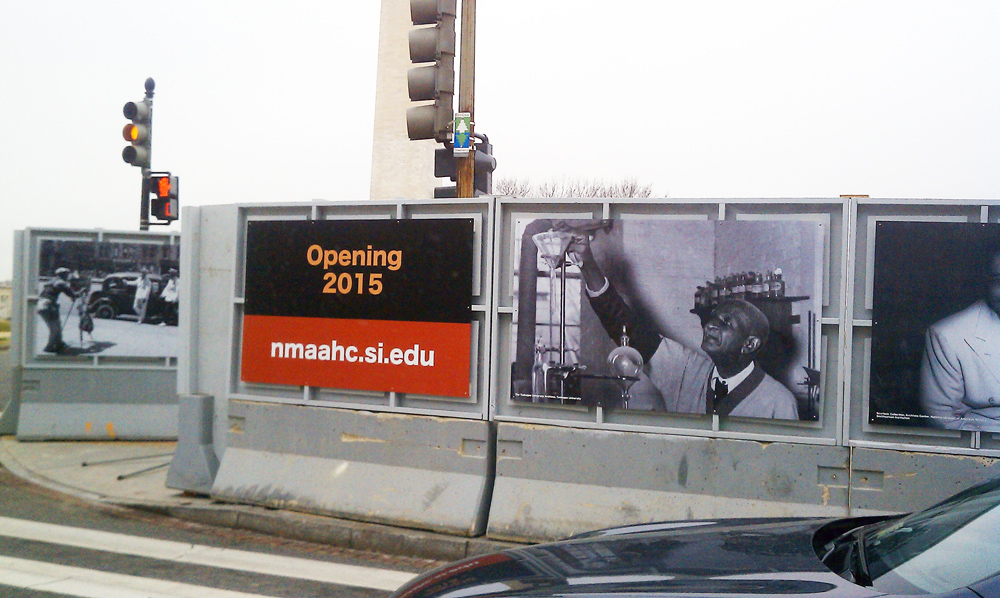
Construction signs at the future site of the National Museum of African American History and Culture in Washington, D.C.

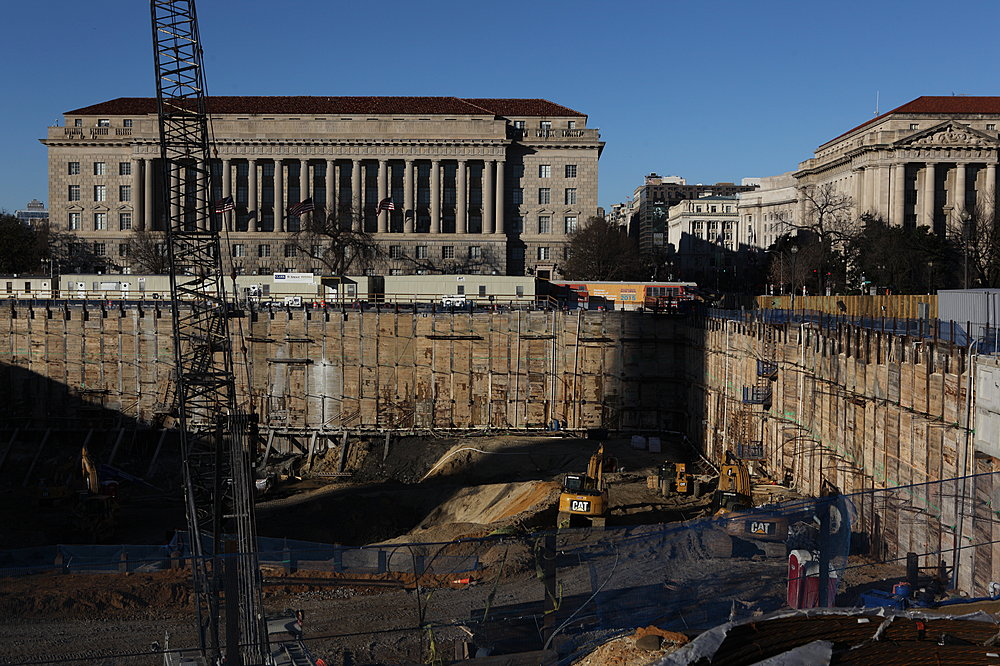
Construction site – January 20, 2013

On February 8, 2005, with the site selection committee still deliberating, President Bush again endorsed placing the museum on the National Mall.

The site selection committee did not issue its recommendation until January 31, 2006—a full 13 months late. It recommended the site west of the National Museum of American History. The area was part of the Washington Monument grounds, but had been set aside for a museum or other building in the L'Enfant Plan of 1791 and the McMillan Plan of 1902. The United States Department of State originally planned to build its headquarters there in the early 20th century, and the National World War II Memorial Advisory Board had considered the parcel in 1995. On March 15, 2005, the Smithsonian named Lonnie G. Bunch III to be the Director of the National African American Museum of History and Culture.

The National Museum of African American History and Culture Council (the museum's board of trustees) sponsored a competition in 2008 to design a 350,000 sq ft (33,000 m^{2}) building with three stories below-ground and five stories above-ground. The building was limited to the 5-acre (20,000 m^{2}) site chosen by the site selection committee, had to be LEED Gold certified, and had to meet stringent federal security standards. The cost of construction was limited to $500 million ($747,681,607 in 2025 dollars). The competition criteria specified that the winning design had to respect the history and views of the Washington Monument as well as demonstrate an understanding of the African-American experience. The winning design was required to reflect optimism, spirituality, and joy, but also acknowledge and incorporate "the dark corners" of the African-American experience. The museum design was required to function as a museum, but also be able to host cultural events of various kinds. Hundreds of architects and firms were invited to participate in the design competition. Six firms were chosen as finalists:

- Devrouax+Purnell and Pei Cobb Freed & Partners
- Diller Scofidio + Renfro, with KlingStubbins
- Freelon Adjaye Bond/SmithGroup
- Foster and Partners/URS Corporation
- Moody Nolan, with Antoine Predock
- Moshe Safdie and Associates, with Sulton Campbell Britt & Associates

The design submitted by the Freelon Group/Adjaye Associates/Davis Brody Bond won the design competition. The above-ground floors featured an inverted step pyramid surrounded by a bronze architectural scrim, which took inspiration from traditional Yoruba veranda posts and columns, and reflected an Oba's crown as used in Yoruba culture. Specifically, these three stacked trapezoidal shapes were inspired by the top of an Olowe of Ise sculpture intented for architectural use, which is now on display inside the museum.

Under federal law, the National Capital Planning Commission, the United States Commission of Fine Arts, and the D.C. Historic Preservation Commission all have review and approval rights over construction in the metropolitan D.C. area. As the design went through these agencies for approval, it was slightly revised. The building was moved toward the southern boundary of its plot of land, to give a better view of the Washington Monument from Constitution Avenue. The size of the upper floors were shrunk by 17 percent. Although three upper floors were permitted (instead of just two), the ceiling height of each floor was lowered so that the overall height of the building was lowered. The large, box-like first floor was largely eliminated. Added to the entrance on Constitution Avenue were a pond, garden, and bridge, so that visitors would have to "cross over the water" like slaves did when they came to America.

The Smithsonian estimated in February 2012 that museum would to open in 2015. Until then, the museum would occupy a gallery on the second floor of the National Museum of American History.

On June 10, 2013, media magnate Oprah Winfrey donated $12 million (~$16.3 million in 2025) to the NMAAHC. This was in addition to the $1 million (~$1.49 million in 2025) she donated to the museum in 2007. The Smithsonian said it would name the NMAAHC's 350-seat theater after her. The GM Foundation announced a $1 million (~$1.34 million in 2025) donation to the museum on January 22, 2014, to fund construction of the building and design and install permanent exhibits.

=== Building design changes ===
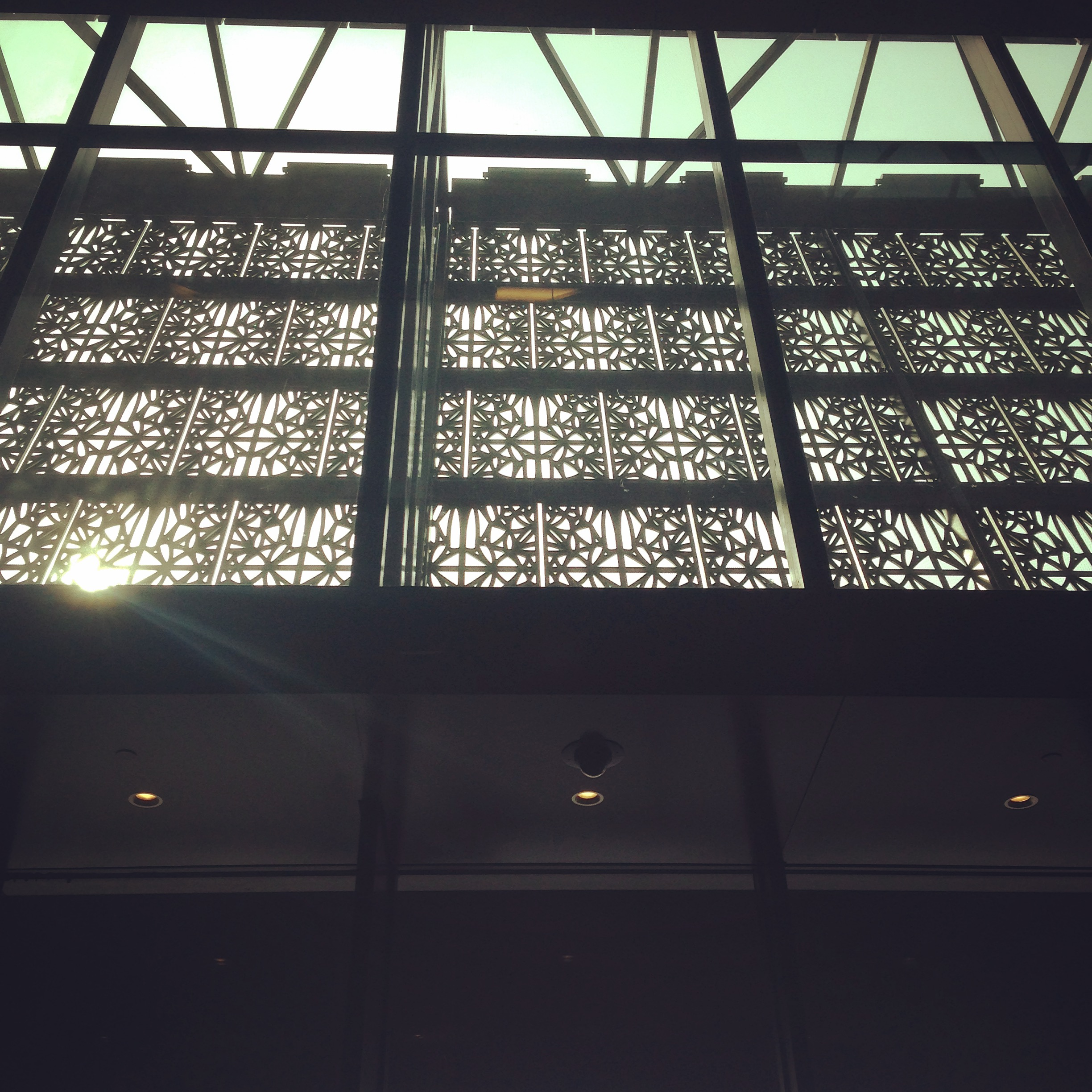
The facade's 'scrim' viewed from the entrance lobby

The design of the architectural scrim which surrounds the building was changed in September 2012. The proposed building itself was a box-like structure. The three-part corona of the building's design was created by a structure only minimally attached to the building. The exterior of this structure, whose frames lean outward to create the corona, consisted of a thin screen or "scrim" perforated by geometrical patterns based on historic iron grilles found in African-American communities in Charleston, South Carolina, and New Orleans, Louisiana. The original design proposed that the scrim be made of bronze, which would have made the museum the only one on the National Mall whose exterior was not made of limestone or marble. Cost issues forced the architects to change this to bronze-painted aluminum in September 2012. The change was approved by the Commission of Fine Arts, but the commissioners criticized the change for lacking the warm, reflective qualities of bronze. Noted architect Witold Rybczynski also criticized the change: "The appeal of bronze is its warm golden sheen and the rich patina that it acquires over time, but uniformly painted surfaces lack these attributes, and over time they don't age, they merely flake. ... At the time of this writing, the African American museum risks compromising its original intention. In architecture, beauty sometimes really is only skin-deep."

The Smithsonian then radically changed the landscaping of the under-construction museum in summer 2013. The original design for the museum planned a wetland with flowing creek, bridges, and native plants in this area. But cost considerations led the agency to eliminate it. At first, the Smithsonian proposed a low hedge. It brought this design to the Commission of Fine Arts in April 2013, which rejected it. The Commission expressed "great concern about the possible loss of the symbolic meaning that had been skillfully woven into the design of both the landscape and the building". In July, the Smithsonian replaced the hedge with a low dull black granite wall. The Commission of Fine Arts approved that redesign, and the Smithsonian brought it to the National Capital Planning Commission. As of August 2013, the NCPC was anticipated to approve it.

Debate over the corona's finish continued into 2014 before being resolved. The Commission of Fine Arts repeatedly urged the architects to use bronze for the scrim, as it created a "shimmering, lustrous effect under many lighting conditions" and "conveyed dignity, permanence and beauty". Duranar paint was the first substitute proposed by the architects, but the commission members rejected it, noting that it had a "putty-like appearance under overcast conditions" and visually fell "far short of the beautiful poetic intention promised by the concept design". A second finish, the sprayable metal LuminOre, was rejected by the commission because it was difficult to produce in the high quality needed, and was prone to flaking and discoloration. Electroless plating and anodized aluminum were rejected because they lacked durability. A physical vapor deposition process involving a nickel-chrome plating was dismissed for not achieving the right color, luster, or warmth. In early 2014, tests were made with polyvinyl difluoride (PVDF). This coating was approved by the Commission of Fine Arts on February 20, 2014, and by the National Capital Planning Commission in April 2014.

=== Construction of the museum building ===
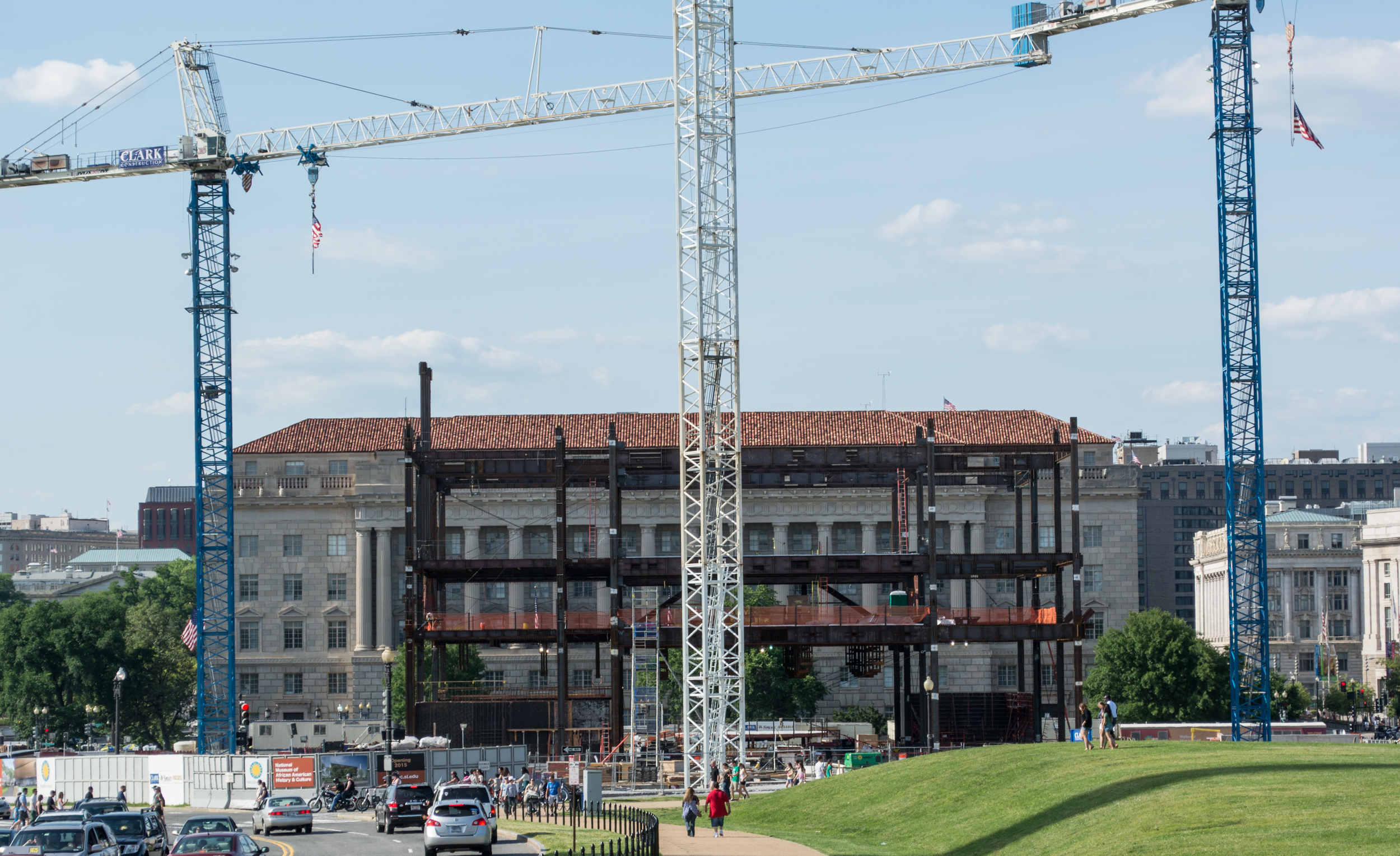
The museum under construction in May 2014

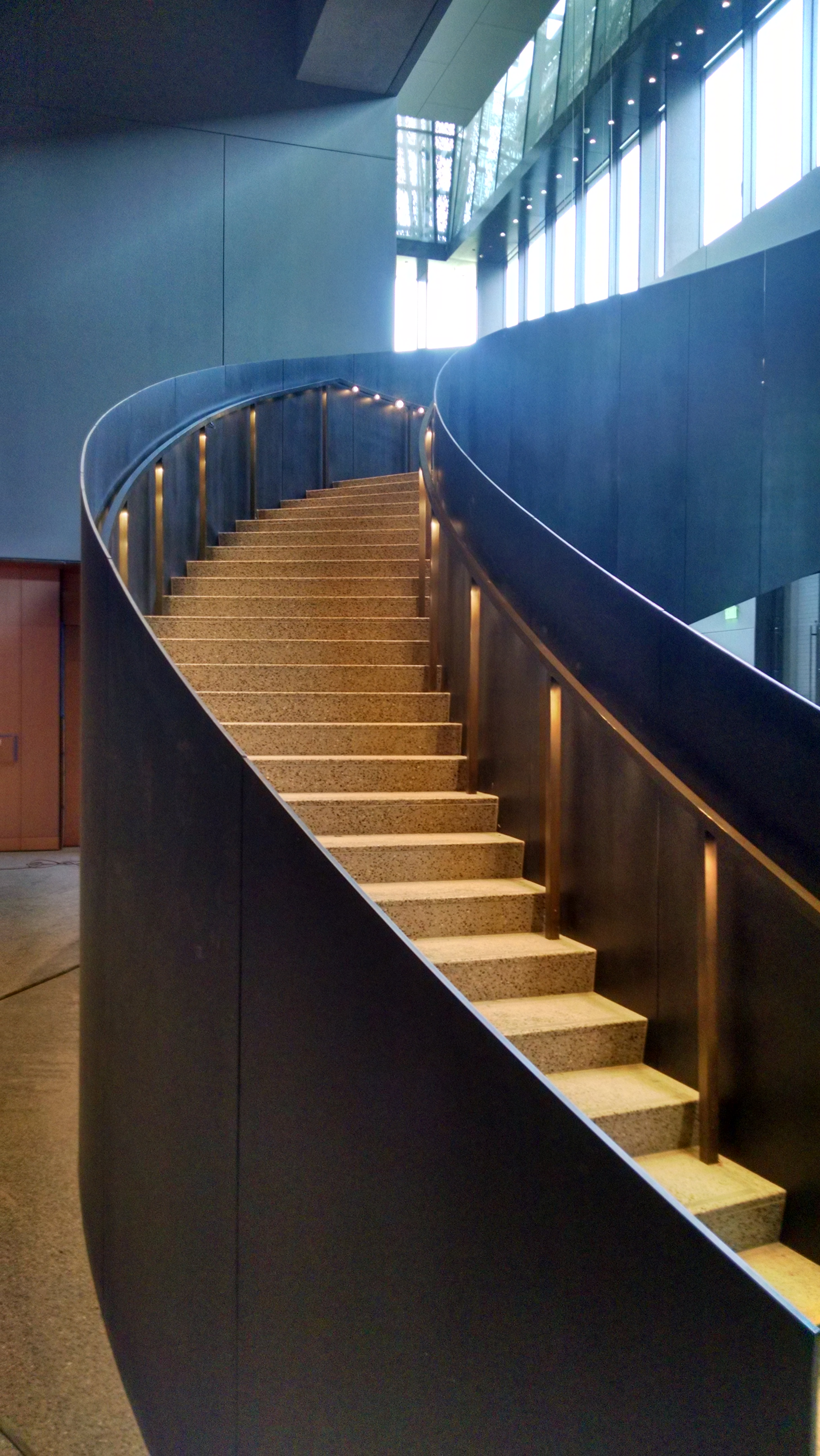
NMAAHC Monumental Stair

The museum's groundbreaking ceremony took place on February 22, 2012. President Barack Obama and museum director Bunch were among the speakers at the ceremony. Actress Phylicia Rashād was the Master of Ceremonies for the event, which also featured poetry and music performed by Denyce Graves, Thomas Hampson, and the Heritage Signature Chorale.

Clark Construction Group, Smoot Construction, and H.J. Russell & Company won the contract to build the museum. The architectural firm of McKissack & McKissack (which was the first African American-owned architectural firm in the United States) provided project management services on behalf of the Smithsonian, and acted as liaison between the Smithsonian and public utilities and D.C. government agencies. Guy Nordenson and Associates and Robert Silman Associates were the structural engineers for the project.

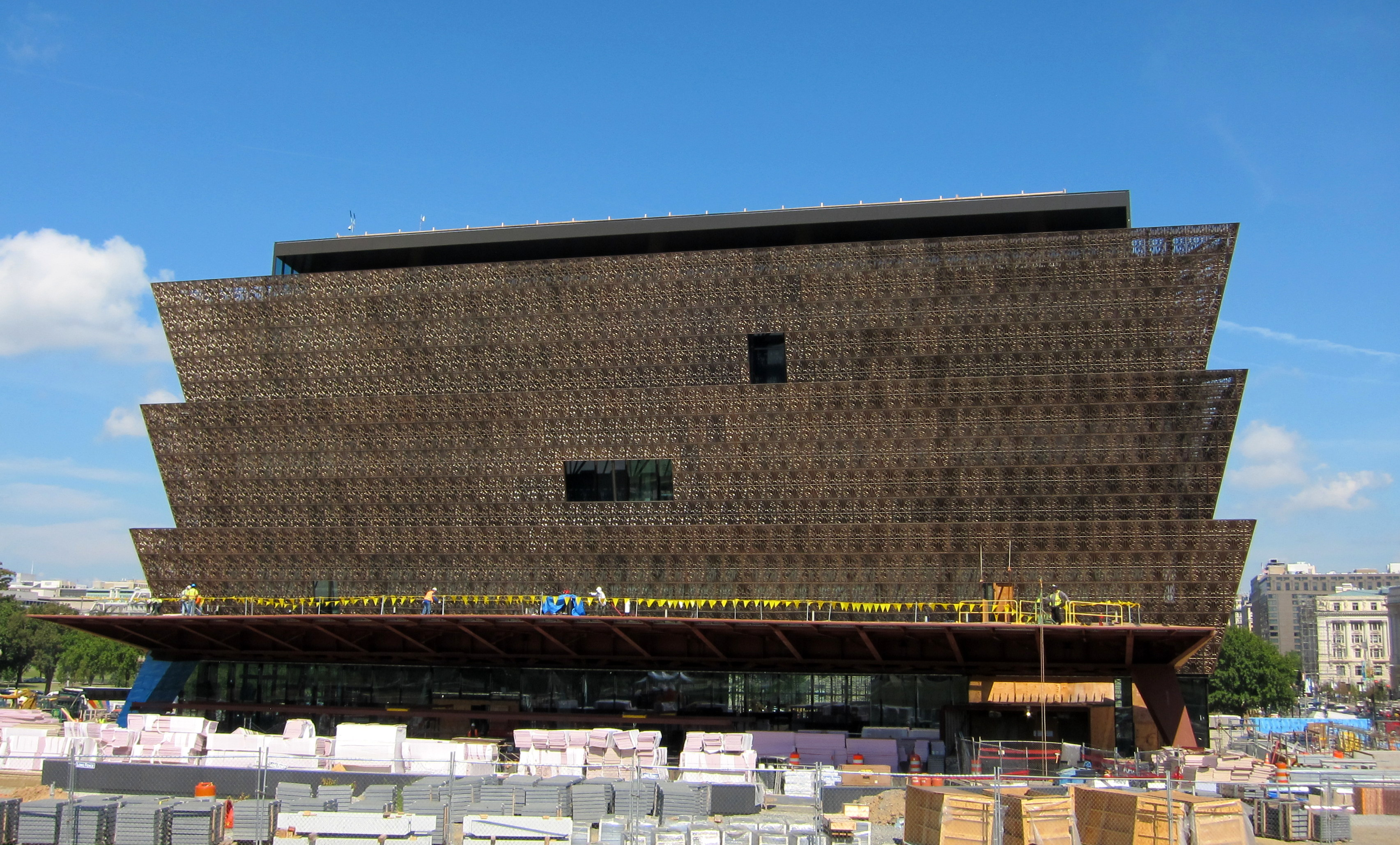
Construction in September 2015

The NMAAHC became the deepest museum on the National Mall. Excavators dug 80 ft (24 m) below grade to lay the foundations, although the building itself will be only 70 ft (21 m) deep. The museum is located at a low point on the Mall, and groundwater puts 27.78 psi (191.5 kPa) on the walls. To compensate, 85 US gal (320 L) per minute of water were pumped out every day during construction of the foundation and below-grade walls, and a slurry of cement and sand injected into forms to stabilize the site. Lasers continually monitored the walls during construction for any signs of bulging or movement.

The first concrete for the foundations was poured in November 2012. As the lower levels were completed, cranes installed a segregated railroad passenger car and a guard tower from the Louisiana State Penitentiary on November 17, 2013. These items were so large that they could not be dismantled and installed at a later date. Instead, the museum had to be built around them. By late December 2013, construction was just weeks from finishing the five basement levels, and above-ground work was scheduled to begin in late January 2014. At that time, the Smithsonian estimated the museum would be finished in November 2015.

Guy Nordenson and Associates were the engineers for the superstructure of the museum building and long-span porch. Robert Silman Associates oversaw the engineering of the below-grade structure and exhibit structural support. The steel was fabricated by SteelFab, Inc. While the below-grade floors were made of reinforced concrete, with columns supporting each floor above, the above-grade floors were primarily exhibit space and needed to be kept column-free. To support the upper floors, four massive walls, consisting of steel frames and cast-in-place concrete infill, were constructed. Design and fabrication of the steel members of the above-ground structure required extreme precision, as the steel elements penetrated one another at more than 500 places and some beams had several hundred bolt-holes in them. All structural steel elements also had to work almost perfectly with the rebar and rebar couplers so that elements would not run into one another and yet maintain structural integrity. A system of girders around the fifth above-ground floor supported the corona. Some of these girders were so complex they required more than 180 parts. The 200 ft (61 m) long-span porch that covers the main entrance was built of long plate girders and box columns (also made of plate). A 16 in (41 cm) long steel camber beam at the midpoint helps support the porch roof. An elliptical monumental staircase runs continually between the above-ground floors. This staircase has no intermediate supports, and weighs in at more than 80,000 lb (36,000 kg). SteelFab fabricated more than 4,050 short tons (3,670 t) of structural steel for the museum in conjunction with AIW, Inc. who fabricated the architecturally exposed, and ornamental steel and bronze metal work. SteelFab received an award from the Washington Building Congress for its work. ArchDaily has reported that the museum was named the winner for the architecture category and the overall winner for the Beazley Design of the Year award for 2017. According to the award criteria set by the Design Museum in London, the NMAAHC is "further solidified as promoting or delivering change, enabling access, extending design practice, or capturing the spirit of the year." Ozwald Boateng OBE, a jury member, made a statement expressing his thoughts on the NMAAHC: "We couldn't look any further than the Smithsonian for the overall award. It is a project of beautiful design, massive cultural impact, delivers an emotional experience, and has a scale deserve of this major award."

Topping out of the museum occurred in October 2014. That same month, the Smithsonian announced that the National Museum of African American History and Culture had received $162 million in donations toward the $250 million cost of constructing its building. To bolster the fundraising, the Smithsonian said it would contribute a portion of its $1.5 billion capital campaign to help complete the structure.

The entire steel superstructure and all above-ground concrete pouring was complete in January 2015. Glass for the windows and curtain walls began to be placed that same month, with glass enclosure of the building complete on April 14, 2015. That same day, the first of the structure's 3,600 bronze-colored panels for the building's corona were installed.

A worker was severely injured at the construction site on June 3, 2015, when scaffolding on the roof collapsed on top of him. 35-year-old Ivan Smyntyna was rushed to a local hospital, where he later died.

The 350,000 sq ft (33,000 m^{2}) building has a total of 10 stories (five above and five below ground).

=== Opening ===
In January 2016, the Smithsonian set an opening day of September 24, 2016, for the museum's opening. President Barack Obama would dedicate the museum, which would be followed by a week of special events. The museum would open for extended hours during that week to accommodate crowds and visitors.

NMAAHC officials said that construction scaffolding around the exterior of the building should come down in April 2016, at which time some of the more dust-and-humidity resistant artifacts and displays could be installed. Installation of more delicate items would wait until the building's environmental controls had stabilized the interior humidity and removed most of the dust from the air. The museum identified 3,000 items in its collections which would form 11 initial exhibits. More than 130 video and audio installations would be installed as part of these exhibits.

In January 2016, the museum announced the receipt of a $10 million gift from David Rubenstein, CEO of The Carlyle Group and a Smithsonian regent, as well as a $1 million donation from Wells Fargo. As of January 30, 2016, the museum still needed to raise $40 million toward its $270 million construction goal.

Two unique documents, both signed by President Abraham Lincoln, would be loaned to the museum for its opening. These are commemorative copies of the 13th Amendment and the Emancipation Proclamation, of which only a limited number were printed. Few of these have survived. David Rubenstein purchased both items in 2012.

In late March 2016, Microsoft announced a $1 million (~$1.31 million in 2025) donation to the museum. On March 27, the museum drew criticism for agreeing to include a small number of items from the career of actor Bill Cosby in a planned exhibit about African Americans in the entertainment industry. Women who have accused Cosby of sexual assault objected to the display. In response to the resulting controversy, the museum added the following sentence to its description of Cosby's career: "In recent years, revelations about alleged sexual misconduct have cast a shadow over Cosby's entertainment career and severely damaged his reputation."

Google donated $1 million (~$1.31 million in 2025) to the museum in early September 2016. The technology firm had previously worked with the NMAAHC to create a 3D interactive exhibit which allows visitors to see artifacts in a close-up, 360-degree view using their mobile phone. The 3D exhibit was created by designers and engineers from the Black Googler Network.

On September 16, 2016, violinist Edward W. Hardy composed and performed Evolution – Inspired by the Evolution of Black Music for the Congressional Black Caucus at a Google sponsored event in Howard Theatre. This event was a part of the opening of the Smithsonian National Museum of African American History and Culture.

On September 23, 2016, The Washington Post reported that Robert F. Smith, the founder, chairman, and CEO of Vista Equity Partners, had given $20 million (~$26.3 million in 2025) to the NMAAHC. The gift was second-largest in the museum's history, exceeded only by the $21 million donated by Oprah Winfrey.

Ava DuVernay was commissioned by the museum to create a film which debuted at the museum's opening on September 24, 2016. This film, August 28: A Day in the Life of a People (2016), tells of six significant events in African-American history that happened on the same date, August 28. The 22-minute film stars Lupita Nyong'o, Don Cheadle, Regina King, David Oyelowo, Angela Bassett, Michael Ealy, Gugu Mbatha-Raw, André Holland and Glynn Turman. Events depicted include William IV's royal assent to the UK Slavery Abolition Act in 1833, the 1955 lynching of 14-year-old Emmett Till in Mississippi, the release of Motown's first number-one song, "Please Mr. Postman" by The Marvellettes, Martin Luther King, Jr.'s 1963 "I Have a Dream" speech, the landfall of Hurricane Katrina in 2005 and the night then-senator Barack Obama accepted the Democratic nomination for president at the 2008 Democratic National Convention.

On September 24, 2016, President Barack Obama formally opened the new museum along with four generations of the Bonner family, from 99-year-old Ruth Bonner to Ruth's great-granddaughter Christine. Together with the Obamas, Ruth and her family rang the Freedom Bell (rather than cut a ribbon) to officially open the museum. (Note: Ruth Bonner was the daughter of Elijah B. Odom of Mississippi, an escaped slave who lived through the years of Reconstruction and segregation.) The bell came from the first Baptist church organized by and for African Americans, founded in 1776 in Williamsburg, Virginia, where at the time it was unlawful for blacks to congregate or preach. (Note: At least 17 churches nationwide rang their bells at the same time to mark the opening of the museum.) During his speech at the museum's opening, Obama shed tears discussing his thoughts on visiting the museum with future grandchildren. The opening ceremony also included a speech by Muriel Bowser and a performance by Angélique Kidjo.

The total cost of the museum's design, construction, and installation of exhibits was $540 million ($724,417,637 in 2025 dollars). By the time the museum's founding fundraising campaign had ended, the NMAAHC had raised $386 million ($517,824,459 in 2025 dollars), 143 percent more than its goal of $270 million.

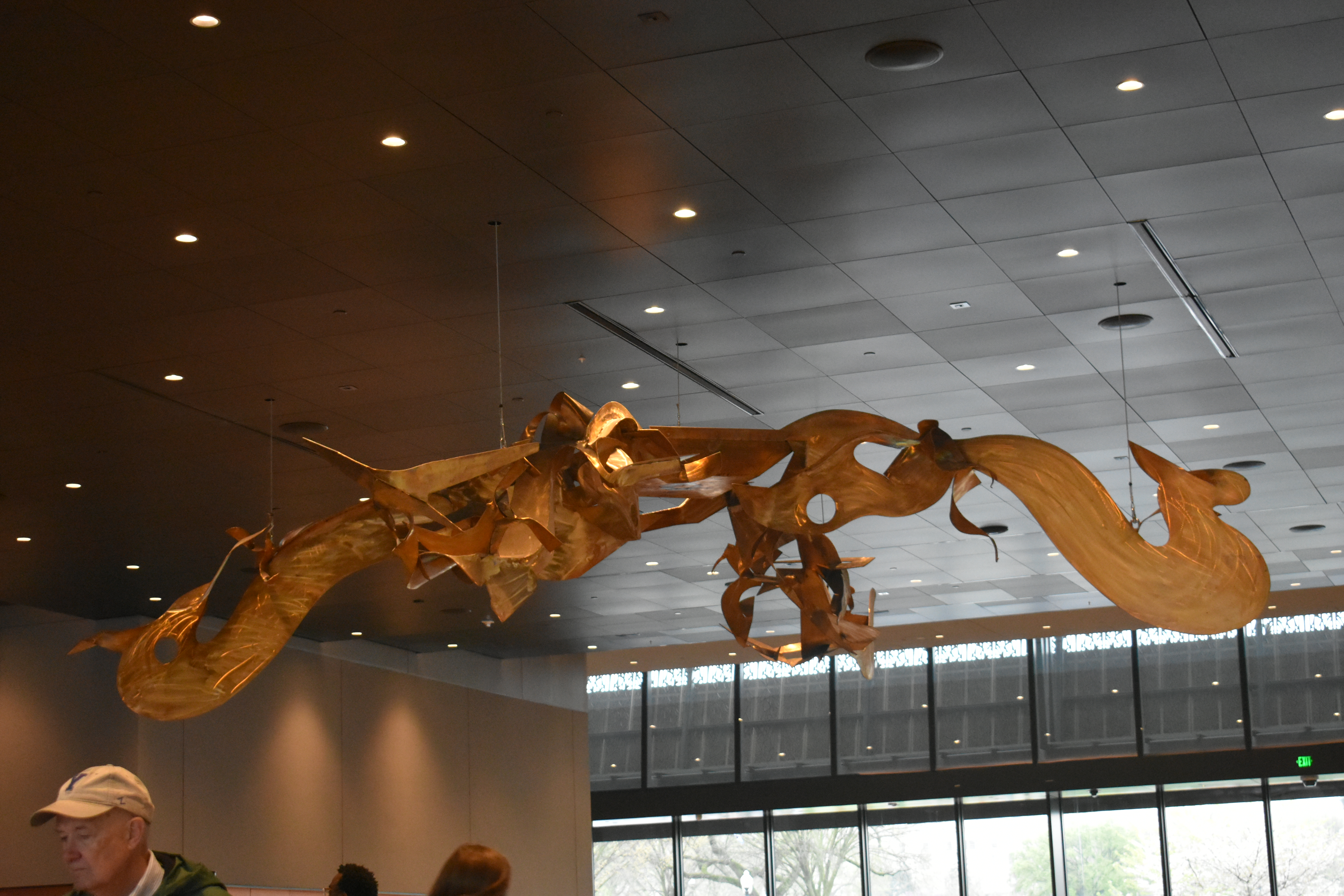
Swing Low Welded bronze by Richard Hunt. National Museum of African American History and Culture, Smithsonian Institution, Washington, DC

== Attendance and timed-entry ticketing ==
More than 600,000 people visited the museum in its first three months. The Smithsonian required all visitors to have a ticket to access the museum. At first, the organization used pre-purchased timed-entry tickets, combined with a limited number of same-day tickets released every morning. The timed-entry tickets allowed visitors to enter at a specific time of day, with a shorter wait in line than would be expected if everyone showed up at the same time. Patron traffic proved so heavy that the NMAAHC began offering many fewer same-day tickets, and changed their release from early morning to early afternoon. (Note: Comparisons with other museums is difficult as they may be different in size, or designed for patrons to linger longer (thus slowing the entry of new visitors). With these caveats in mind, the newly-renovated National Museum of American History had 720,000 visitors in its first three months of operation in 2007–2008; the newly-renovated National Portrait Gallery and Smithsonian American Art Museum drew an estimated 322,000 visitors in their first three months of operation in 2007; the National Museum of the American Indian had 820,000 visitors in its first three months of operation in 2004; the International Spy Museum (a non-Smithsonian museum) had a calculated 300,000 visitors in its first three months of operation in 2002; and the United States Holocaust Museum (a non-Smithsonian museum) had a calculated 360,000 visitors in its first three months of operation in 1993.)

After six months, 1.2 million people had visited the NMAAHC, making it one of the four most-visited Smithsonian museums. Patrons spent an average of six hours at the museum, twice as long as had been estimated before the museum's opening. The museum's popularity led to some problems. Visitors stood in line in the museum foyer to take an elevator down to the underground level. The exhibits start with the Middle Passage and slavery where the hallway is intentionally designed to be cramped and somewhat claustrophobic. The large number of visitors who stop to read the exhibit's signs caused dangerous overcrowding. Museum officials began to limit the number of people who could take the elevator (and thus enter the exhibit) to mitigate this problem, although this led to still longer lines in the foyer.

Smithsonian officials announced that the museum had 3 million visitors in its first full year of operation. An average of 8,000 people a day attended the museum, double the number anticipated. The museum has become an "essential stop" for tourists, and patrons are diverse and international (not just African American and domestic). The heavy attendance has caused wear and tear on the museum.

The museum reassessed the use of timed-entry passes in October 2017, and suspended the use of timed-entry ticketing on weekdays in September 2018. Overwhelming demand for entry led the museum to reinstitute the timed-entry ticketing policy for weekdays in October 2018. (Note: As of November 2022, veterans, active-duty personnel, and first responders with one guest could enter without timed entry passes.)

By the end of 2018, the museum had received just under 5 million visitors since it opened, 1.9 million of whom visited in 2018. It was the organization's sixth most-visited museum, behind the National Portrait Gallery (2.3 million) and ahead of the National Zoo (1.8 million).

== Collection and exhibits ==
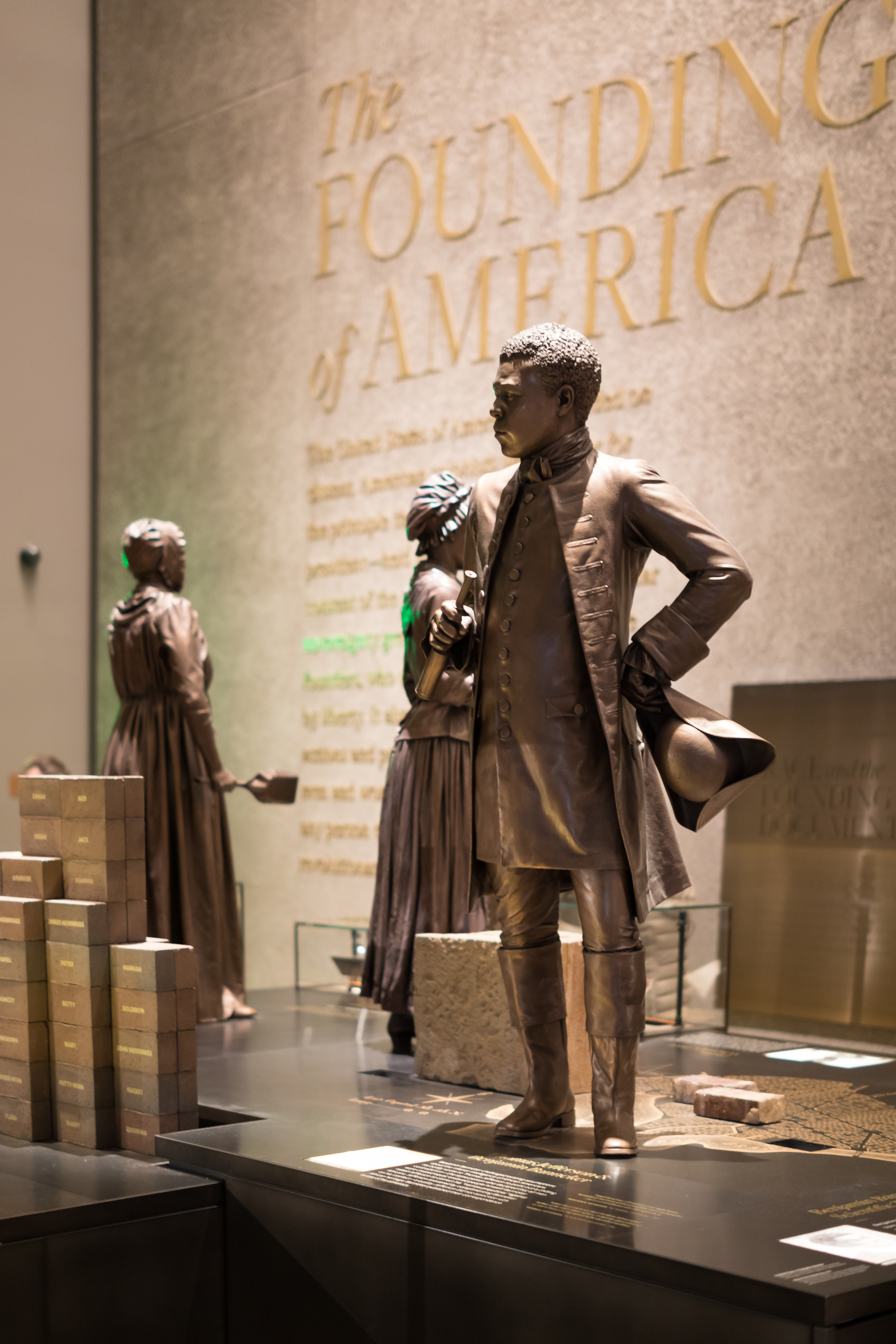
Statue of Benjamin Banneker

=== Web presence ===
In 2007, the NMAAHC became the first major museum to open on the Web before completing a physical structure. The web site included the museum's first exhibit, mounted in New York City. The site was also designed to encourage collaboration between scholars and the public. The main feature of the web-based initiative was the Memory Book application, which allowed individuals to contribute to the web site pictures, a story, or an audio application to spotlight unique experiences in African-American culture.

=== Pre-opening exhibits ===
In January 2012, the National Museum of African American History and Culture and the National Museum of American History partnered with the Thomas Jefferson Foundation (which owns Jefferson's home, Monticello) to create a major new exhibit, "Slavery at Jefferson's Monticello: Paradox of Liberty". The exhibition opened on January 12, 2012, at the National Museum of American History, and closed on October 14, 2012. The exhibit received nationwide attention, garnering articles from sources such as the Associated Press, Huffington Post, National Public Radio, the New York Times, United Press International, USA Today, and the Washington Post. The 3,000 sq ft (280 m^{2}) exhibit was created by Rex Ellis (an associate director of the NMAAHC) and Elizabeth Chew (a curator at Monticello). It was accompanied by a companion book, 'Those Who Labor for My Happiness': Slavery at Thomas Jefferson's Monticello, by Lucia Stanton. NMAAHC director Lonnie Bunch III said that the exhibit explored one way in which slavery might be presented at the National Museum of African American History and Culture when it opens in 2015.

"Slavery at Jefferson's Monticello" also received attention for the striking statue of Jefferson that graced the exhibit entrance. The Smithsonian used a Minolta 3D scanner to create a digital image of a life-size bronze statue of Jefferson which is located at Monticello. RedEye on Demand (a subsidiary of Stratasys) used a fused deposition modeling printer, which laid down tiny layers of molten plastic to slowly build the statue. The statue was "printed" in four sections, which were then put together, detailed, and painted. Smithsonian officials were so pleased with the process that they began laying plans use it to laser image and 3D print a vast number of items in their collection, which they could then share inexpensively with the rest of the world.

Other pre-opening exhibitions include Ain't Nothing Like the Real Thing: The Apollo Theater and American Entertainment (2010), For All the World to See: Visual Culture and the Struggle for Civil Rights (2010), The Scurlock Studio and Black Washington: Picturing The Promise (2009), and Let Your Motto Be Resistance: African American Portraits (2007).

=== Notable items in the collection ===
As of 2026, the NMAAHC housed more than 45,000 objects. About 3,500 items are on display to the public.

Items obtained by the museum initially were received, conserved, and stored at the Smithsonian Museum Support Center in Suitland, Maryland. Dozens of permanent curatorial staff and temporary contractors accessed the items, repaired them, and conserved them in a temperature- and humidity-controlled environment. Renée Anderson, the NMAAHC's head of collections, oversaw the effort. After artifacts were selected for display, graphics and labels for each item were manufactured. Display cases for each item were also purchased, and exhibiting mounts or specially designed cases handcrafted for particularly fragile, important, or unusually sized objects. Museum officials said all artifacts and displays will be moved into the new museum in the summer of 2016, along with the museum's 175 full-time employees.

In November 2016, NBA player LeBron James donated $2.5 million (~$3.28 million in 2025) to support the museum's exhibit on the accomplishments of boxer Muhammad Ali.

As of September 2016, notable items in the collection included:

==== Pre-20th century ====
- Several items from the São José Paquete Africa, a sunken slave ship excavated off the coast of South Africa in 2015. The wreck is owned by Iziko Museums of South Africa, and items will be on long-term loan to the NMAAHC. (Finding a sunken slave ship, raising it, and displaying it at the museum had long been a dream of the museum's first director Lonnie Bunch.)
- A letter by Toussaint L'Ouverture, leader of the Haitian Revolution slave revolt in 1791.
- A money box used by Richard Allen, founder of the African Methodist Episcopal Church.
- A Bible owned by Nat Turner, who led a slave rebellion in Virginia in 1831.
- Historic items from black Catholic communities, including the St. Augustine Church and Sisters of the Holy Family in New Orleans.
- A slave cabin that was deconstructed and rebuilt from its original location on Edisto Island, South Carolina.
- Ashley's Sack, a mid-1800s hand-embroidered feedsack gifted from a slave mother, Rose, to her nine-year-old daughter, Ashley, when Ashley was sold away. Returned to Middleton Place in 2021.
- Feet and wrist manacles from the American Deep South used prior to 1860.
- Garments worn by African-American slaves.
- A badge from 1850, worn by an African American in Charleston, South Carolina, indicating the wearer was a slave.
- Items owned by Harriet Tubman, including eating utensils, a hymnal, and a linen and silk shawl given to her by Queen Victoria of the United Kingdom. Related items include a photographic portrait of Tubman (one of only a few known to exist), and three postcards with images of Tubman's 1913 funeral.
- An 1874 home from Poolesville, Maryland. The dwelling was constructed by the Jones family, who were freed slaves. The Joneses later founded an all-black community nearby.

==== 20th and 21st centuries ====
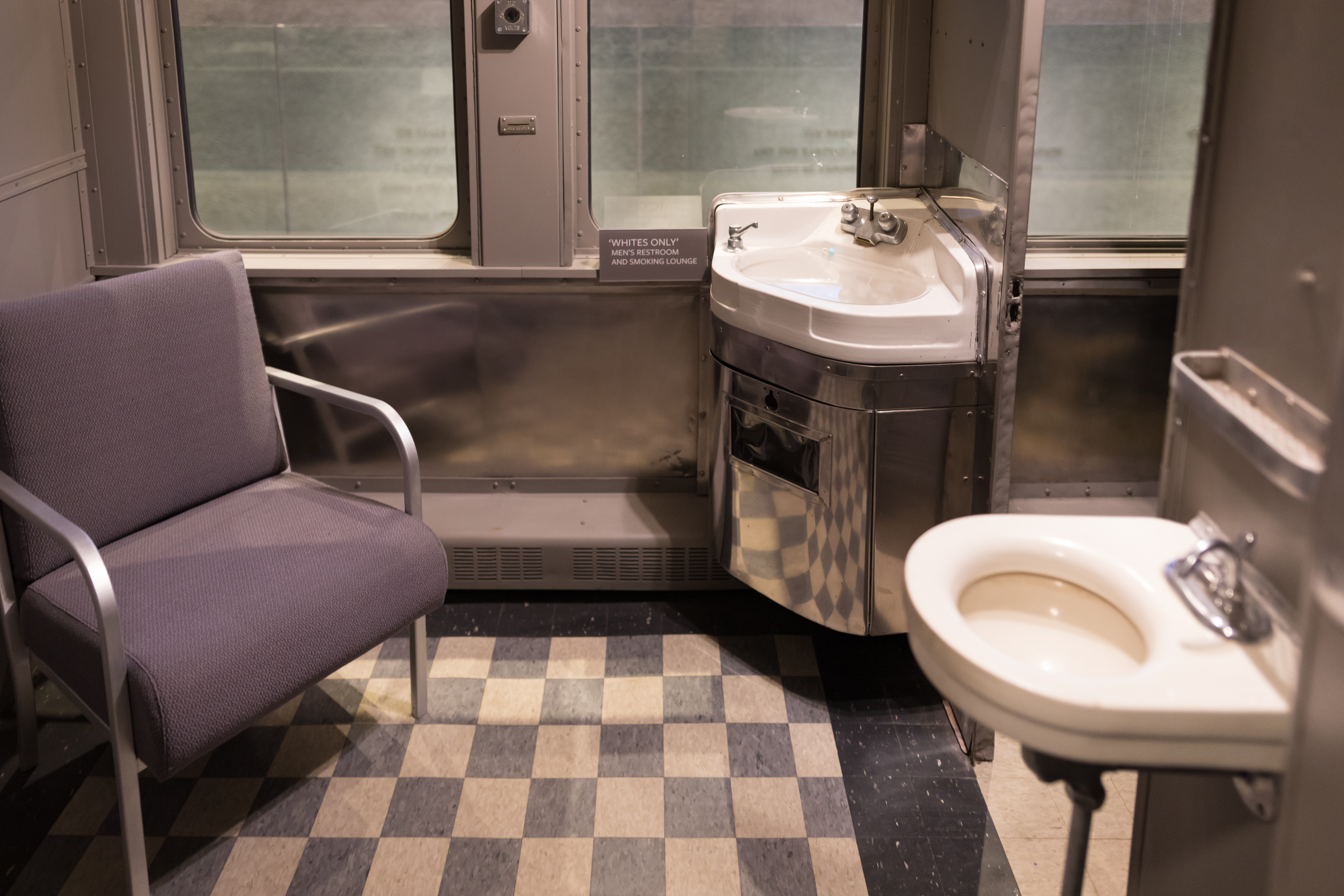
'Whites Only' – Men's restroom and smoking lounge in Southern Railway Company Coach No. 1200, 1923, redesigned as a segregated car in 1940

- A railroad car from Chattanooga, Tennessee, used by African-American passengers during the Jim Crow era. Pete Claussen and Gulf & Ohio Railways (the company he founded in 1985) donated more than $222,000 to restore the car, which was built by the Pullman Company in 1922.
- The desk of Robert Sengstacke Abbott, editor-in-chief of the Chicago Defender, an African American newspaper founded in 1905.
- A segregated drinking fountain from the Jim Crow era with the sign "colored" (indicating it was for use by blacks only).
- Dresses and other garments by fashion designer Ann Lowe. Lowe designed clothing for the Du Pont family, Roosevelt family, and the Rockefeller family. She also designed items for wealthy etiquette expert and socialite Emily Post and her family, and created Jacqueline Bouvier's wedding dress for her 1953 marriage to John F. Kennedy.
- A recreation of part of "Mae's Millinery Shop", the hat shop begun by Mae Reeves in 1942, one of the first businesses in Philadelphia owned by an African-American woman.
- The Purple Heart and footlocker owned by James L. McCullin, a member of the Tuskegee Airmen.
- A PT-13D Stearman biplane trainer aircraft operated by the United States Army Air Forces and used in 1944 for training members of the Tuskegee Airmen.
- A sign from a bus in Nashville, Tennessee, from the Jim Crow era which indicates which seating is for blacks only.
- A guard tower and cell from the Louisiana State Penitentiary (Angola) known for much of the 20th century as a cruel, violence-prone, squalid prison where African American inmates were treated worse than slaves. NMAAHC curator Paul Gardullo said the items document how attitudes about slavery were carried over into the post-slavery prison system in the Deep South. Museum Director Lonnie Bunch acknowledged scholars' worries that the items were controversial, but said the museum's mission is to tell stories through the African-American experience. The 20 ft (6.1 m) high guard tower will be part of an exhibit on segregation, while the 6 by 9 ft (1.8 by 2.7 m) prison cell will be in a separate exhibit on places. Both items are from Camp A, the oldest section of the prison. The cell was constructed atop slave quarters.
- A King Super 20 alto saxophone custom-made for saxophonist Charlie Parker in 1947, which he played from 1947 until his death in 1955.
- Allan Rohan Crite's painting Stations of the Cross (1947)
- David Driskell's Behold Thy Son (1956)
- The glass-topped casket originally used to display and bury the body of 14-year-old Emmett Till, the victim of racially motivated torture and murder in Mississippi. Till's death served as a catalyst for the Civil Rights Movement.
- The dress which Rosa Parks was sewing the day she refused to give up her seat to a white man on a bus in Montgomery, Alabama, on December 1, 1955. Parks' action sparked the Montgomery bus boycott, and her action was one of the first incidents of civil disobedience in the Civil Rights Movement.
- A Selmer trumpet owned by jazz musician Louis Armstrong.
- Muhammad Ali's boxing gloves. Boxing headgear worn by Cassius Clay (later to be known as Muhammad Ali).
- A dress owned by actress and singer Pearl Bailey.
- A cape and jumpsuit owned by American soul singer James Brown.
- The Moog Voyager synthesizer and Akai MPC beat machine used by hip-hop producer J Dilla.
- A chef's jacket worn by Leah Chase, the New Orleans–based chef known as the Queen of Creole Cuisine.
- The "Mothership", a 1,200 lb (540 kg) aluminum and acrylic glass prop created by funk music singer George Clinton and used during performances of his bands Parliament and Funkadelic. Clinton's original "Mothership" was scrapped in 1983; this replica was crafted by Clinton in the mid-1990s and used for about five years.
- A collection of costumes designed by director and costume designer Geoffrey Holder for his 1976 musical, The Wiz (an adaptation of the L. Frank Baum novel, The Wonderful Wizard of Oz). The costumes won the Tony Award for Best Costume Design, the play won the Tony Award for Best Musical, and Holder won the Tony Award for Best Direction of a Musical.
- A cherry red Cadillac convertible owned by rock and roll singer Chuck Berry.
- An amplifier, speakers, and turntables used by Tony Crush a.k.a. DJ Tony Tone of the Cold Crush Brothers.
- Several paintings and pieces of terracotta sculpture from the Barnett-Aden Collection, donated by BET founder Robert L. Johnson. (Note: The Barnett-Aden art collection documented African American culture, history, and lifestyles from 1800 to 1972. All the works in the collection are by African Americans. The collection was created by Dr. James V. Herring, a professor of art at Howard University, and Alonzo J. Aden, the first curator of Howard University's Gallery of Art. Aden founded the Barnett-Aden Gallery (named for his mother, Naomi Barnett Aden) in October 1943, and together he and Herring built the collection. Aden died suddenly on October 13, 1961, and Herring on May 29, 1969. The collection was broken up into three pieces, although nearly all of it was left to Aden's friend, Adolphus Ealey. The National Museum of African American Art in Florida purchased Ealey's portion in 1989, and Johnson acquired the collection in 1997 after the museum went bankrupt.)
- Gymnastic equipment used by artistic gymnastics champion Gabby Douglas at the 2012 Summer Olympics. Douglas was the first African American, and first non-Caucasian of any nationality, to win the women's artistic individual all-around gold medal. She was also the first American gymnast ever to win both the team and individual all-around gold at the same Olympics.
- The handcuffs used by police in Cambridge, Massachusetts, to arrest African-American Harvard University professor Henry Louis Gates Jr., in 2009.
- Hip Hop Smithsonian, a collection of photographs of hip hop artists collected by Bill Adler.
- Items from President Barack Obama's 2008 presidential campaign office from Falls Church, Virginia.
- A pair of hand-painted sneakers, titled "Obama 08", by artist Van Taylor Monroe.
- NBA player Kobe Bryant's uniform that he wore in the 2008 NBA Finals, the year he was named the league MVP. Bryant and his wife Vanessa were also founding donors of the museum.
- Janet Jackson's hoop and key earring.

==== Modern art installations ====
- Swing Low, 2016, by Richard Hunt, a monumental welded-bronze sculpture, is installed as the centerpiece of the Central Hall. The forms reference the movement evoked by the spiritual "Swing Low, Sweet Chariot". The hanging sculpture commemorates the Negro Spiritual and their place in the history of African Americans.
- Yet Do I Marvel (Countee Cullen), by Sam Gilliam, is separated into five colorful panels with glassy, varnished surfaces was inspired by the poem by Countee Cullen which refers to the resilience of creativity.
- The Liquidity of Legacy, 2016, by Chakaia Booker is about the changes that shape people's lives and legacy.
- Message to Our Folks, 2023, by Rashid Johnson is the culmination of the series of Bruise Paintings which draw on the song “(What Did I Do to Be So) Black and Blue” by Fats Waller, Harry Brooks and Andy Razaf — made popular in a recording by Louis Armstrong — which directly links the blues to Blackness.

== Leadership ==
Lonnie Bunch III was the museum's founding director being appointed in 2005, overseeing collections, traveling exhibitions as well as planning and building. On May 28, 2019, Bunch was elected Secretary of the Smithsonian Institution. He became the Smithsonian's first African-American leader. The interim director of NMAAHC was history professor Spencer Crew. Poet and professor Kevin Young was appointed director in September 2020. He officially stepped down in April 2025.

== Restaurant ==
Sweet Home Café is a 400-seat, luncheon-only restaurant located inside the National Museum of African American History and Culture. Ramin Coles is the executive chef, and the restaurant is managed by Restaurant Associates in association with Thompson Hospitality. Joanne Hyppolite, NMAAHC curator for cultural expressions, oversees the restaurant as well as the museum's exhibits on foodways and cuisine. The cafeteria opened on September 24, 2016. It was named a 2017 semifinalist by the James Beard Award for Best New Restaurant.

The restaurant features four food stations, where main and side dishes, desserts, and beverages important to the African American experience or developed by African Americans may be purchased. These include the Agricultural South station, the Creole Coast station, the North States, and the Western Range. Each station offers several vegetarian entrees in addition to meat dishes.

In designing the museum, the Smithsonian was influenced by the development of the Mitsitam Café at the National Museum of the American Indian. That cafeteria had been established to acquaint museum-goers with the rich food heritage of indigenous peoples of the Americas. Mitsitam Café not only proved popular and won culinary awards, it made a substantial profit. The idea of regional food stations came from Jessica B. Harris, a food scholar who researched the food of African Americans from the colonial era to the present and presented her research to the museum's scholarly committee in 2013. Albert Lukas, a supervising chef at Sweet Home Café, traveled the United States for two years to find recipes and interview home cooks and professional chefs. A committee of chefs, curators, and historians spent another two years working out the restaurant's concept, visual design, and menu. The final menu was designed by executive chef Grant not only to showcase the kinds of food African Americans of different regions ate at different times in American history, but also to demonstrate the impact African Americans had on both home cooking and haute cuisine in the broader society.

Chef Carla Hall, co-host of the television show The Chew, was named a "culinary ambassador" for the restaurant. She engages in public outreach for the restaurant and museum.

== Reception ==
In a review for The New York Times, art critic Holland Cotter wrote, "The extremely complex narrative, with uplift and tragedy seemingly on a fixed collision course, spreads over five floors of galleries", and that it "holds some of the oldest and most disturbing material." Cotter added that "It's great that the museum mixes everything together: It means you can't just select a comfortable version of history." He concluded, "[I] hope, actually—that the museum will never be finished, or consider itself so; that its take on African-American history, which is American history, stays fluid, critical and richly confused: real, in other words."

The Wall Street Journal's critic at large, Edward Rothstein, suggested that "even a full day's visit is insufficient for a careful survey. That alone is an imposing achievement". Rothstein wrote that the "museum is illuminating, disturbing, moving—and flawed". He wrote that we "see the evolution of African-American newspapers, businesses, churches and other institutions. Galleries devoted to music and sports make it plain how much African-American history and culture is simply American history and culture." He also wrote that there is a "reluctance, too, to cast doubt on one perspective or another, or to give a nuanced assessment of conflicts. The actual doctrines of Elijah Muhammad, a leader of the Nation of Islam and mentor to Malcolm X, are unmentioned. And, more troubling, the Black Panthers are characterized as if they were defensively armed social workers, a PC view of radicalism that recurs in other contexts.". Museum reviewer Diana Muir, while criticizing the Museum for repeatedly misleading visitors by failing to put facts in "comparative perspective" a deficiency that "misleads curators into making sweeping claims like the assertion in the introductory room that before 1400 "slavery was a temporary status", nevertheless concluded that "Taken as a whole, however, the NMAAHC shows that it is possible to do an identity museum well, to build a museum on a foundation of rigorous scholarship that can inform, excite, and even inspire."

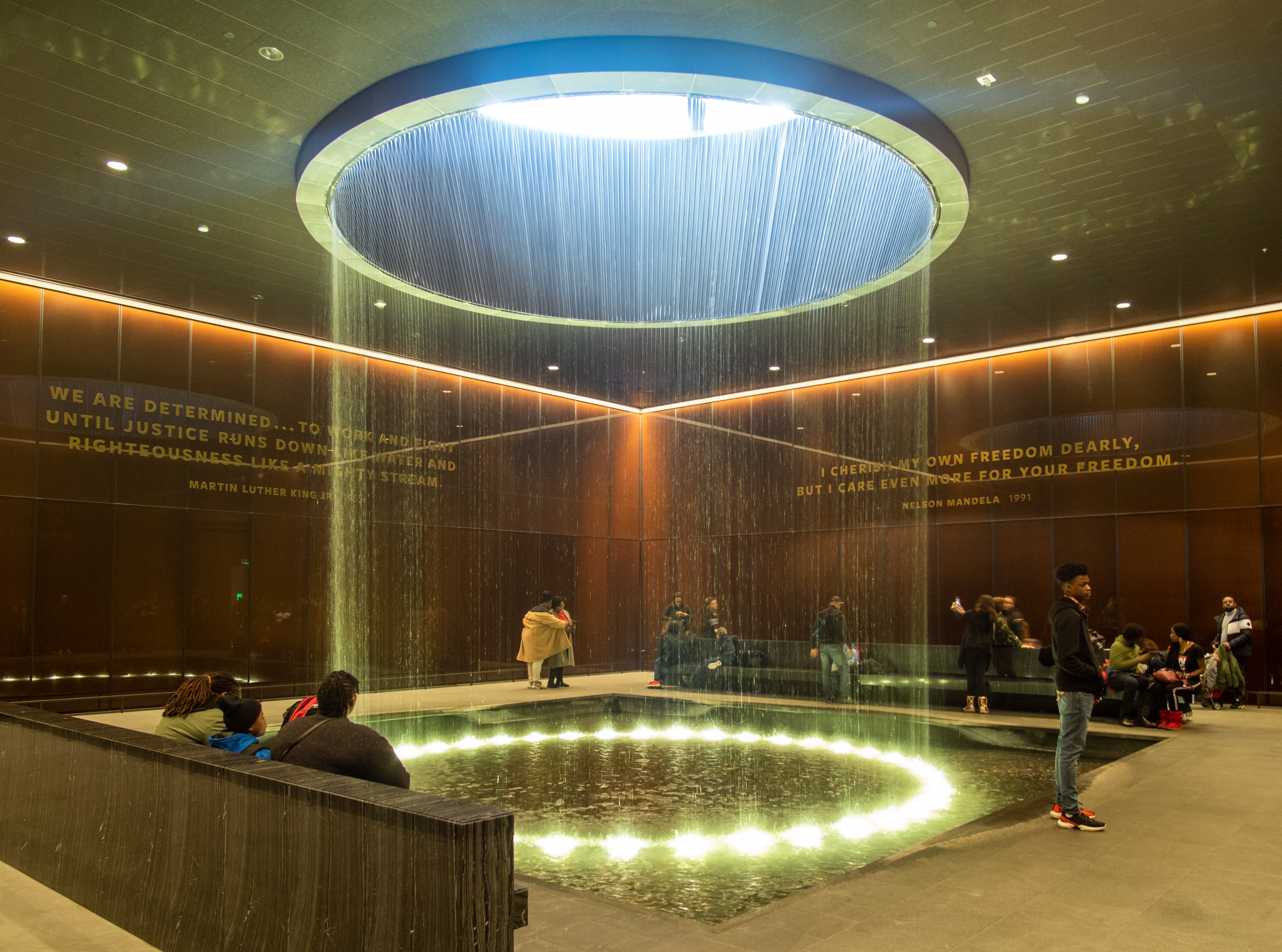
The Contemplative Court

Los Angeles Times architecture critic Christopher Hawthorne wrote that the museum is the "most impressive and ambitious public building to go up in Washington in a generation" and that despite "some flaws and unfortunate signs of cost-cutting, the design succeeds almost precisely to the degree that it is enigmatic and even fickle, spanning huge gulfs in the national character without being naive enough to try to close them. The building embraces memory and aspiration, protest and reconciliation, pride and shame."

In The Plain Dealer, Susan Glaser wrote that the museum "is really two museums in one: Its historical exhibits encompasses [sic] about 60 percent of the gallery space, while cultural exhibits take up the other 40 percent." She wrote that the museum is "filled with difficult truths", such as a "statue of Thomas Jefferson, author of the words 'All Men Are Created Equal,' who is depicted in front of a brick wall – and on every brick, the name of one of his 609 slaves, including at least six who were his own children." But she wrote that "[i]t was the coffin of Emmett Till that finally got to me." She describes 14-year-old Till, who was lynched for allegedly whistling at a white woman: "Though his body was severely disfigured, his mother insisted on an open casket at his funeral, hoping to show the world the effects of racial injustice. It helped ignite the civil rights movement."

Because of its lengthy name and the unpronounceable acronym NMAAHC derived from it, a few journalists, following the trend established on social media, used the nickname "the Blacksonian" for the museum, based on its content and its relationship to the Smithsonian.

The Washington Post architectural critic Philip Kennicott assessed the museum as its one-year anniversary, concluding that the NMAAHC has "changed the center of gravity on the Mall" and created "energy along 14th Street and Constitution Avenue NW that feels new, and welcome". Generally effusive in his praise, Kennicott found the museum to have an "allusive and mediated" feel, as opposed to the traditional "magisterial and transparent" aesthetic of most museums. He singled out the way the corona cast shadows in the interior, the dramatic way the corona framed nearby monuments and memorials, and the museum's art gallery. Kennicott was unhappy with "the jumble of elevations throughout the history galleries". The problem particularly affected the Contemplative Court (where corrosion was also affecting the ceiling less than a year later). Museum designers correctly concluded that the cramped entrance to the underground galleries would create a powerful and negative emotional reaction, he said, but the side-effect has been to create a "fundamental flaw" in the museum by creating a terrific bottleneck in visitor traffic. A 2018 exhibition review in the Chicago Tribune noted the museum is practically—and unexpectedly to the museum's planners—"one of the toughest tickets to get in American culture" and posited that this was "proof that the nation wanted desperately to grapple with some of the thorniest questions about the people it brought here by force".

On July 16, 2020, the museum removed a chart from their website titled "Aspects and Assumptions of Whiteness & White Culture in the United States" that had been put up on March 31. Some examples that were claimed to be part of white culture were objectivity; rational, linear thinking; emphasis on the scientific method; hard work being the key to success; delayed gratification; the nuclear family; self-reliance; and being polite. After criticism, museum officials apologized and removed the chart, explaining that it did not contribute to the discussion as planned.

In March 2025, Donald Trump launched an attack on the museum, issuing a presidential executive order, "Restoring Truth and Sanity to American History" and citing the museum as an example of how the Smithsonian and its institutions "portray American and Western values as inherently harmful and oppressive".

== See also ==
- List of museums focused on African Americans
- List of most-visited museums in the United States

== Bibliography ==
- Blakey, Michael L. (1994). "American Nationality and Ethnicity in the Depicted Past". In Gathercole, Peter; Lowenthal, David (eds.). The Politics of the Past. New York: Psychology Press. ISBN 9780415095549.
- Robinson, Randall (2001). The Debt: What America Owes to Blacks. New York: Plume. ISBN 9780525945246.
- Ruffins, Fath Davis (June 1998). "Culture Wars Won and Lost, Part II: Ethnic Museums on the Mall". Radical History Review: 68–79.
- Rybczynski, Witold (2013). How Architecture Works: A Humanist's Toolkit. New York: Farrar, Straus and Giroux. ISBN 9780374211745.
- Through the African American Lens: Double Exposure. Washington D.C.: National Museum of African American History and Culture, Smithsonian Institution. 2015. ISBN 9781907804465.
- Worth, Michael J. (2016). Nonprofit Management: Principles and Practice. Los Angeles: Sage Publications. ISBN 9781483375991.
