= Contact high =

Drug-like effect from proximity to drug users

Contact high is a phenomenon that occurs in otherwise sober people who experience a drug-like effect just by coming into contact with someone who is under the influence of a psychoactive drug. In a similar way to the placebo effect, a contact high may be caused by classical conditioning as well as by the physical and social setting.

== Definition ==
The term contact high has its roots in the drug culture of the 1950s and 1960s.

In 1969, a drug abuse book for high school students defined "contact high" as "becoming high merely by interacting with one who is high". In 1971, a glossary of drug users' language describes a contact high as "a psychogenic 'trip' without taking drugs, by being close to somebody while he is on drugs". The term is sometimes incorrectly used to describe the high experienced by a person who has inhaled secondhand smoke.

In Alexander Shulgin's book PiHKAL, under the 2C-I entry, a notable reaction was observed in a participant who took a placebo while in an environment with other people who are under the influence of a drug. The participant wrote that he had "absorbed the ambience of the folks who had actually imbibed the material".

== In popular culture ==
The 1966 debut album by New York band the Godz was titled Contact High with the Godz.

Kokomo, the Beach Boys song from the 1988 film Cocktail and album Still Cruisin', includes the lyric "gave me a tropical contact high".

== See also ==
- Substance abuse
- Hotboxing
- Body-centred countertransference
