= Ice Cold. A Hip-Hop Jewelry History (exhibition) =

2024-2025 Photography and jewelry exhibition in New York

- Date: May 9, 2024 – January 5, 2025
- Venue: American Museum of Natural History
- Location: New York
- Theme: Jewellery, Photography, Hip-hop culture
- Curators: Vikki Tobak

Ice Cold. A Hip-Hop Jewelry History was a large scale hip-hop culture, photography, and jewelry exhibition. It was hosted by the American Museum of Natural History in New York City in the Allison and Roberto Mignone Halls of Gems and Minerals wing from May 2024 to January 2025.

Much of the exhibit's content was a physical incarnation of material published in the 2022 book Ice Cold. A Hip-Hop Jewelry History by Vikki Tobak. In addition to large prints of the book's photographic imagery, 68 pieces of custom "bling" jewelry were exhibited, including large gold chains, diamond pendants, watches, and grills worn by hip hop stars such as A$AP Rocky, Bad Bunny, Cardi B, Migos, Slick Rick, Ghostface Killah, Tyler The Creator and Pharrell, Run DMC and Drake.

The exhibition traced five decades of jewelry in hip-hop, beginning with the oversized gold chains embraced by rap’s pioneers in the late 1970s and moving into the 1990s, when the genre surged in popularity and artists wore record-label pendants glittering with diamonds and platinum. As hip-hop grew exponentially in the new millennium, its most influential artists gravitated toward colorful jewelry and inventive designs inspired by high fashion, pop culture, rap history, and more. Featuring jewelry from every era of hip-hop, the exhibition looks at how adornment relates to resilience, rebellion, and creative self-expression.

== Reception ==
The show was considered by Vogue to be "the first major show to celebrate and contextualize the custom bling". In their review, The New York Times said that the exhibition "speaks volumes with its bling".

== Conception ==
AMNH curator, author and jewelry expert Marion Fasel, had positively reviewed the Ice Cold book in 2022 for her jewelry platform Aventurine, and began talks with Vikki Tobak regarding the possibility of making an exhibit at the NaturaL History Museum.

== Jewelry highlights ==
Exhibit jewelry pieces included Nicki Minaj‘s "Barbie" chain, Roxanne Shanté's Juice Crew ring, A$AP Rocky's nameplate chain, Ghostface Killah's eagle bracelet, the Ruff Ryders pendant, The Notorious B.I.G.'s "Jesus Piece" chain, and the diamond Roc-A-Fella Chain.

== Featured recording artists ==
Among the recording artists and celebrities photographed with their jewelry pieces in the book are Eric B. & Rakim, Run-DMC, Grandmaster Flash, The Notorious B.I.G., Megan Thee Stallion, Tupac, Jay-Z, Erykah Badu, Migos, Nicki Minaj, Cardi B, Pharrell Williams, Jay-Z, Gucci Mane, and Cardi B, Eric B. & Rakim, N.W.A., Takashi Murakami, Cam'ron, Tyler the Creator, and Bad Bunny.

== Featured photographers ==
Featured photographers in the exhibition included Mike Miller (the book's cover photographer), Wolfgang Tillmans, Janette Beckman, Jamel Shabazz, Timothy White, Gillian Laub, David LaChapelle, Danny Clinch, Chris Buck, Lisa Leone, Ithaka Darin Pappas, Phil Knott, Raven B. Varona, Al Pereira, and Albert Watson.
