= Ice Cold. A Hip-Hop Jewelry History =

2022 book by Vikki Tobak

- Author: Vikki Tobak
- Language: English
- Genre: Photography
- Published: Taschen
- Publication place: Germany, United States
- Pages: 460
- ISBN: 9783836584975

Ice Cold. A Hip-Hop Jewelry History is a 2022 photography book created and written by Vikki Tobak, and included a accompanying New York museum exhibition.

Ice Cold: A Hip-Hop Jewelry History (the follow up book to Tobak's 2018 Contact High: A Visual History of Hip-Hop) explores rappers’ jewelry and the culture of bling. Drawing on four decades of images and stories, this visual history illustrates hip-hop’s world, where superstars from Run-DMC and Tupac to Jay-Z, Migos, and Cardi B display custom pieces as expressions of status and personal style.

== Details ==
The book features a foreword from rapper and record producer Slick Rick and essays by Ferg, LL Cool J, and Kevin "Coach K" Lee and Pierre “P” Thomas of Quality Control Music.

== Book reception ==
CNN calls the book, The biography of Bling.

Harper's Bazaar stated, Vikki Tobak’s “Ice Cold: A Hip-Hop Jewelry History” is a must-read for music fans and diamond lovers.

NPR described it as The history of hip hop told thru bling.

The New York Times said the book illustrates how, hip-hop has shown the wold how jewelry could become a living document, a statement to individual identity and social order.

== Editions ==
Initially styled as hardbound release measuring 9.8 x 13.4 inches and costing around $100. In 2026, the 45th edition of the book released and measured 6.14 x 8.54 inches and was priced at approximately $30

In addition, a series of 'Ice Cold limited Art Editions was released retailing from $1250 to $7500). These featured signed photographs from photographers, original jewelry and book sleeves made of synthetic alligator hide.

== Featured jewelers ==
Among the many jewelers whose works are featured in the book are; Tito Caicedo of Manny’s, Eddie Plein, and Jacob the Jeweler as well as newer artisans such as Avianne & Co., Ben Baller/IF & Co., Greg Yuna, Johnny Dang, Eliantte, and others.

== Featured recording artists ==
Among the recording artists and celebrities photographed with their jewelry pieces in the book are; Eric B. & Rakim,Run-DMC, Grandmaster Flash, The Notorious B.I.G., Megan Thee Stallion, Tupac, Jay-Z, Erykah BaduMigos, Nicki Minaj, Cardi B, Pharrell Williams, Jay-Z, Gucci Mane, and Cardi B, Eric B. & Rakim, N.W.A., Takashi Murakami, Cam'ron, Tyler the Creator and Bad Bunny.

== Featured photographers ==
Featured photographers in Ice Cold. A Hip-Hop Jewelry History include; Mike Miller (the book's cover photographer), Wolfgang Tillmans, Janette Beckman, Jamel Shabazz, Timothy White, Gillian Laub, David LaChapelle, Danny Clinch, Chris Buck, Lisa Leone, Ithaka Darin Pappas, Phil Knott, Raven B. Varona, Al Pereira, Albert Watson.

== Association with New York Museum Exhibition ==
From May 9, 2024 — January 5, 2025 Ice Cold. A Hip-Hop Jewelry History (exhibition) incarnated as a large scale exhibition, curated by Tobak at the Allison and Roberto Mignone Halls of Gems and Minerals within the American Museum of Natural History in New York City. It was considered by Vogue, the first major show to celebrate and contextualize the custom bling.In addition to the book's photographic imagery, 68 items of custombling jewelry were exhibited including; large gold chains, diamond pendants, watches and gleaming grills worn by Hip hop stars such as A$AP Rocky, Bad Bunny, Cardi B, Migos, Slick Rick, Ghostface Killah, Tyler The Creator and Pharrell, Run DMC and Drake.
