= Contact High: A Visual History of Hip-Hop =

2018 book by Vikki Tobak

- Front cover
- Author: Vikki Tobak
- Language: English, Japanese
- Genre: Photography
- Published: Penguin Random House / Clarkson Potter
- Publication place: United States, Japan
- Pages: 288
- OCLC: 0525573887

Contact High: A Visual History of Hip-Hop is a 2018 photography book created and written by Vikki Tobak and ongoing exhibition series. The volume features contact prints from analog photography sessions of hip hop artists during roughly forty-years, from the beginnings of the genre in the late 1970s until the late 2000s.

Beginning first as an Instagram account in 2016 created by Tobak, the then entitled Contact High Project soon appeared as a regular column in Mass Appeal. It was shown in exhibit form for the first time at the 2017 Photoville in Brooklyn before being signed to a book deal in 2018.

== Details ==
The book has a foreword by Questlove and essays by Bill Adler, Rhea L. Combs, Fab Five Freddy, Michael Gonzales, Young Guru, DJ Premier, and RZA.

The book explores the development of hip hop through the perspective of its photographers. Accompanying the unedited contact sheets in the book are also the personal stories of the sixty featured photographers relating specifically to the musical artists that they worked with on these images. The content of the book is organized chronologically and measures hip hop's rise of influence from old-school to alternative hip hop across the world.

Among the featured photographic subjects in the book are Notorious B.I.G., Tu Pac, Jay-Z, Nicki Minaj, Eminem, Nas, Kendrick Lamar, Salt-N-Pepa, and Kanye West. Hip hop figures DJ Kool Herc, Rock Steady Crew and street artists Futura and Keith Haring are also included.

== Book reception ==
The book was included in Time's "25 Best Photobooks of 2018".

== Museum exhibitions ==
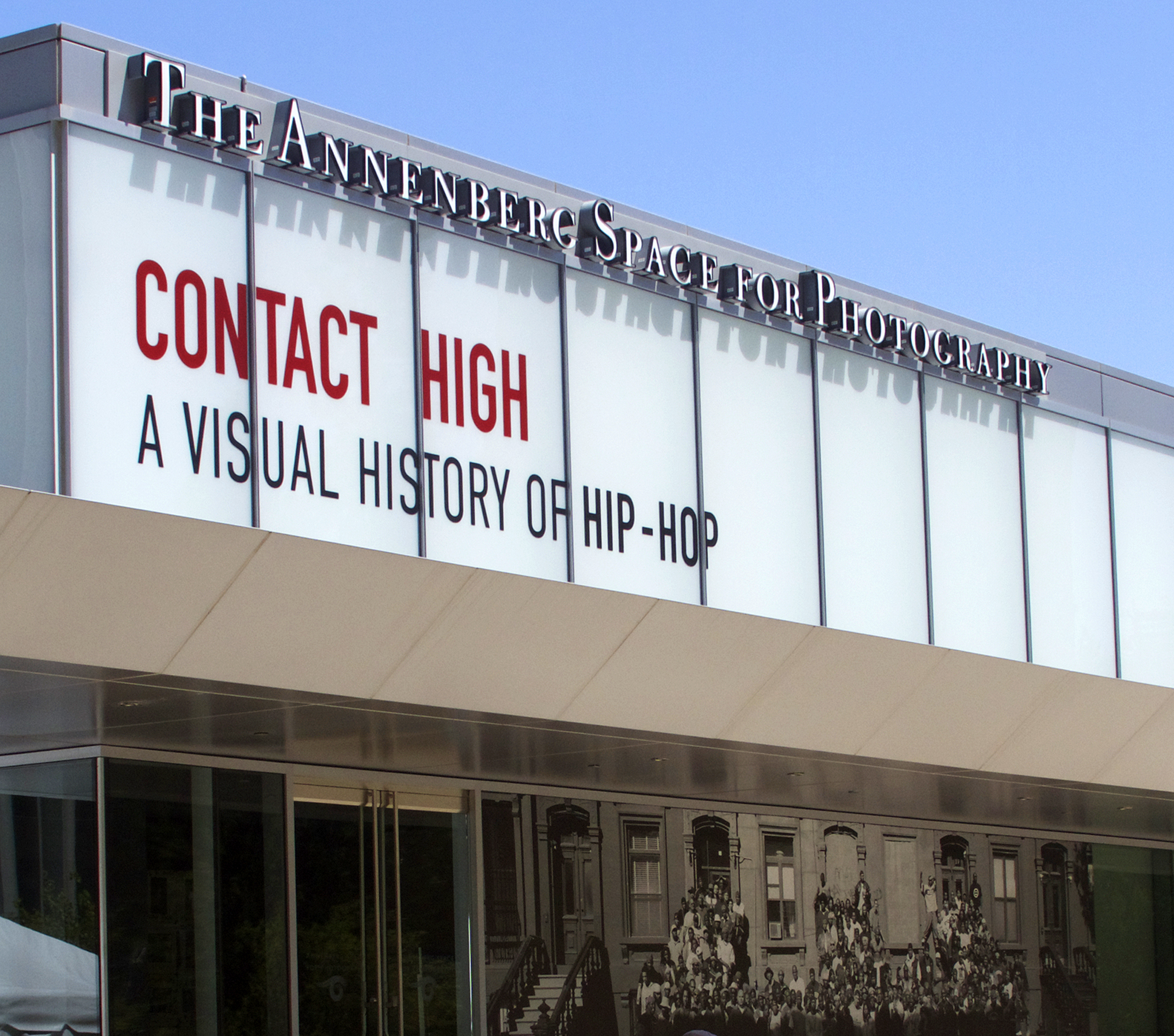
Contact High: A Visual History of Hip Hop exhibit at The Annenberg Space For Photography 2019

Los Angeles

In April 2019, The Annenberg Space for Photography in Los Angeles hosted an exhibit, also called Contact High: A Visual History of Hip-Hop, reflecting the entirety of the book's content. It was curated by the author, Vikki Tobak, with creative direction by Fab Five Freddy.

In addition to videos, memorabilia, and music to complement the photographs, the exhibit also included a documentary short film produced by the Annenberg Foundation and RadicalMedia, and produced and directed by Melissa Haizlip, featuring a selection of the Contact High photographers at work and in conversation including; Janette Beckman, Danny Clinch, Eric Coleman, Joe Conzo, Brian B+ Cross, Jack McKain, Estevan Oriol, Jorge Peniche, Ithaka Darin Pappas, Dana Scruggs and Jamel Shabazz.

One of the pieces in the exhibit is an installation surrounding Barron Claiborne’s group of portraits of The Notorious B.I.G wearing a plastic gold crown in front of a bright red backdrop. The pictures were made in March 1997, three days before the rapper's untimely death. The most known image from the series entitled "The King of New York," is one photograph from a couple of dozen of the rapper from the photo session. Most of these other photographs had never been seen by the public before inclusion in the book Contact High. In addition to a 100 cm x 150 cm print of the principal image, the museum exhibit installation of "The King Of New York" featured one of Small's music videos playing on a small screen alongside two enlarged contact prints as well as the plastic crown that Claiborne had purchased for the shoot.

New York

After the exhibit's debut in Los Angeles, Contact High: A Visual History of Hip-Hop was scheduled to be exhibited in its entirety for the second time from January 18, 2020 – May 15, 2020 at the International Center of Photography in New York as part of the inauguration of the ICP's new location at 79 Essex Street on Manhattan's Lower East Side. The exhibit's opening event was attended by Oscar-winner Marisa Tomei, Questlove, ASAP Rocky, Debi Mazar, Jasmine Lobe, Contact High documentary short film producer and director Melissa Haizlip, curator and writer Antwaun Sargent, Contact High curator Vikki Tobak and exhibiting photographers; Janette Beckman, Danny Hastings, Jorge Peniche, Ithaka Darin Pappas, Ricky Powell (now deceased), Lisa Leone, Al Pereira, Barron Clairborne, Dephine Fawandu, Mark Seliger and Joe Conzo Jr. After just four weeks the exhibit was forced to close due to COVID-19 restrictions.

Abu Dhabi

After the exhibit closed prematurely at New York's International Center of Photography, it was then scheduled to open in June 2020 in association with Sole DXB at Manarat Al Saadiyat in Abu Dabhi (UAE) but was postponed, again due to COVID-19, finally opening on Dec 15, 2020 scheduled to until August 31, 2021. It was the first exhibit of its kind in the Middle East

Seattle

On October 16, 2021, Contact High: A Visual History of Hip Hop, opened at the Museum of Pop Culture located in Seattle, Washington for a two-year showing. This rendition of the exhibit also contained artifacts including early rap battle fliers, Tupac Shakur manuscripts, Flavor magazines, and costumes from Sha-Rock, The Notorious B.I.G., and MF Doom.

Rotterdam

On August 11th 2023, Contact High: A Visual History of Hip-Hop (running simultaneously with the Contact High exhibit hosted by the Museum of Pop Culture in Seattle, Washington) opened for the first time in Europe. This three-week incarnation of the show was hosted by Ferro Gashouder in Rotterdam, Netherlands and coincided with the 50th Anniversary of hip hop as a musical genre. Included in its short running were hip hop culture film screenings (presented Black Soil Film Festival) including Wild Style directed by Charlie Ahearn and Beats, Rhymes & Life: The Travels of A Tribe Called Quest directed by Michael Rapaport. There were also live performances by; UK-based hip-hop ensemble OMA, Surinam-born rapper Winne and Dutch vocalists Alee Rock, and ADF Samski.

== Featured photographers and their subjects ==
- Jerome Albertini (The Neptunes, Mos Def, Method Man, Wu-Tan Clan)
- Alice Arnold (Jazzmatazz)
- Marc Baptiste (Erykah Badu)
- Janette Beckman (Run-DMC, EPMD, Salt-N-Pepa, Slick Rick, André 3000)
- Michael Benabib (Mary J. Blige)
- Angela Boatright (Nicki Minaj)
- Sophie Bramly (Fab 5 Freddy, Futura, Keith Haring)
- Sheila Pree Bright (Scarface)
- Drew Carolan (Eric B. & Rakim)
- Barron Claiborne (Biggie Smalls)
- Danny Clinch (LL Cool J, Tupac Shakur, Big L, Redman, Kanye West)
- Joe Conzo Jr. (Tony Tone, Kool Herc, JDL, Grandmaster Caz)
- Eric Coleman & Jeff Jank (MF Doom, Madlib)
- Martha Cooper (Frosty, Rock Steady Crew)
- David Corio (RZA, Gravediggaz)
- Brian “B+” Cross (Ol’ Dirty Bastard, Goodie Mob, J Dilla)
- Armen Djerrahian (Eminiem, Jay-Z)
- George Dubose (The Notorious B.I.G., Biz Markie)
- Nabil Elderkin (Kanye West)
- Delphine A. Fawandu (Mobb Deep)
- Ricky Flores
- Glen E. Friedman (Public Enemy, Beastie Boys)
- Jamil GS (The Firm, Urban Thermo Dynamics)
- Matt Gunther (Gang Starr)
- Danny Hastings (Wu-Tang Clan, Jodeci, Jay-Z, Gang Starr, Lil’ Kim, Big Pun)
- Patrick Hoelck (The Game)
- Mark Humphrey (Guru, The Pharcyde, Tupac Shakur)
- Eric Johnson (Biggie Smalls, Eve, Erykah Badu, Cam’ron)
- Cam Kirk (Gucci Mane)
- Jayson Keeling (LL Cool J)
- Phil Knott (ASAP Rocky)
- Sue Kwon (Ol’ Dirty Bastard)
- Michael Lavine (Outkast, The Notorious B.I.G.)
- Ray Lego (Fat Joe, Kid Cudi)
- Lisa Leone (Snoop Dogg), Nas
- Melodie McDaniel (Pharrell)
- Mike Miller (Tupac Shakur, Westside Connection, Snoop Dogg)
- Ernie Paniccioli (Public Enemy)
- Ithaka Darin Pappas (Eazy-E "Skate Outta Compton", N.W.A., Fab 5 Freddy)
- Gordon Parks (for XXL Magazine)
- Jorge Peniche (Kendrick Lamar, Tyler, the Creator, DJ Quik, Suga Free)
- Al Pereira (Phife Dawg, Redman, Nas, Big Daddy Kane, Queen Latifah, Dr. Dre)
- Carl Posey (Busta Rhymes, DMX, Aaliyah)
- Eddie Otchere (Aaliyah, Ice-T, Black Star, Pharoahe Monch)
- Estevan Oriol (Cypress Hill, 50 Cent)
- Ricky Powell (Jean-Michel Basquiat)
- Jus Ske Salguero (Eminem)
- Mike Schreiber (DMX, Mos Def)
- Jamel Shabazz
- Trevor Traynor (Kool Keith)
- Lawrence Watson (Run-DMC, Roxanne Shanté, LL Cool J)
