= Ricky Powell =

American photographer (1961–2021)

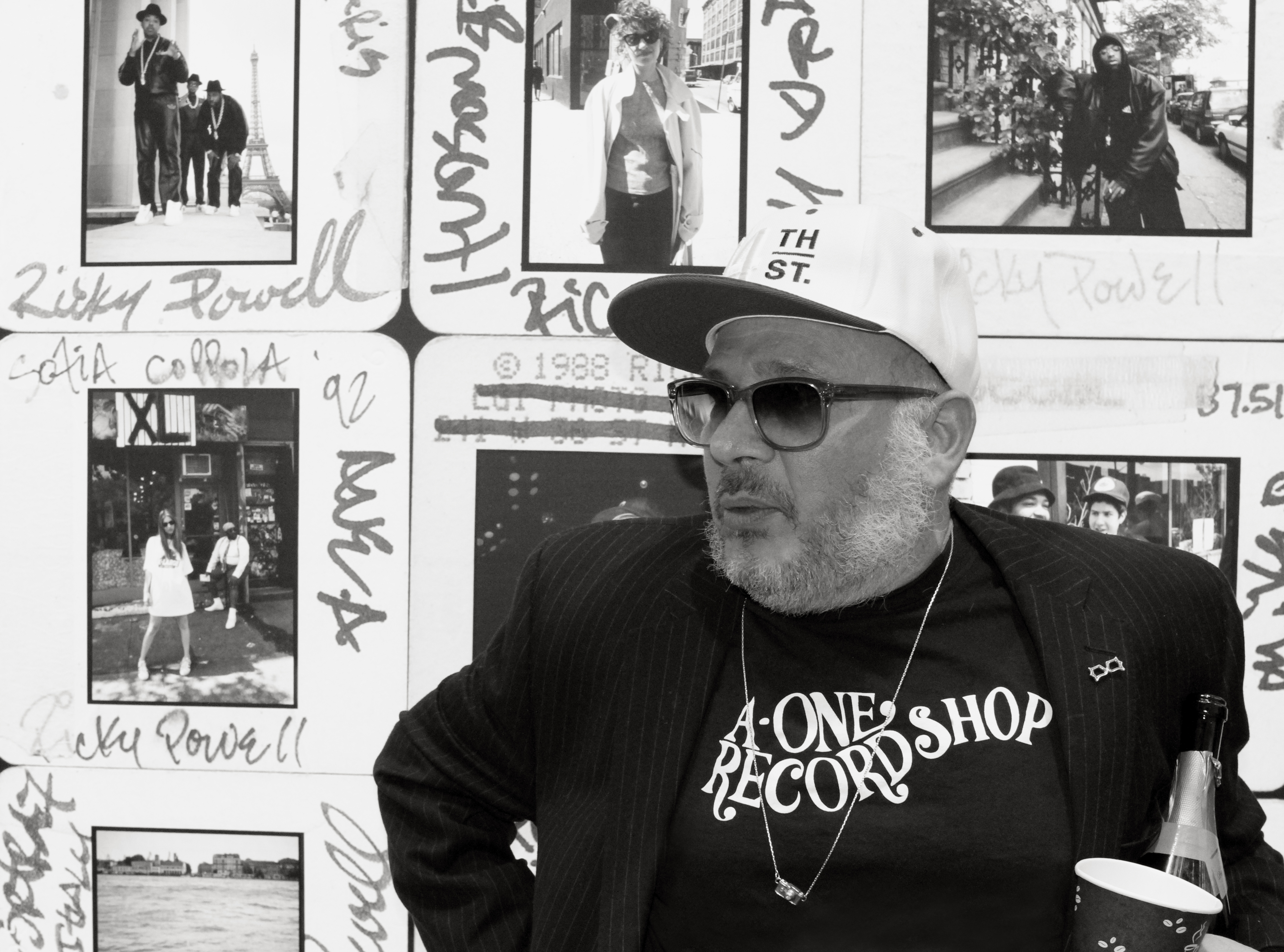
- Powell at the opening of Contact High: A Visual History of Hip-Hop in New York City, 2020
- Born: November 20, 1961; New York City, U.S.
- Died: February 1, 2021 (aged 59); New York City, U.S.
- Occupation: Photographer
- Years active: 1985–2021

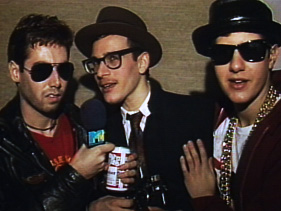
Powell (center) with two of the three Beastie Boys, MCA (left) and Mike D (right)

Ricky Powell (November 20, 1961 – February 1, 2021) was an American photographer who documented popular culture including hip hop, punk rock, graffiti, and pop art. His photographs have been featured in The New York Times, the New York Post, the Daily News, The Village Voice, TIME, Newsweek, VIBE, The Source, Rolling Stone, among other publications. His photographs included candid portraits of artists including Jean-Michel Basquiat, Andy Warhol, Madonna, in addition to many other popular culture artists and other common people. His photographs were included in the books The Rap Photography of Ricky Powell! (1998), The Rickford Files: Classic New York Photographs (2000), Frozade Moments: Classic Street Photography of Ricky Powell (2004), and Public Access: Ricky Powell Photographs (2005) and were exhibited both domestically and internationally.

He toured with American hip-hop group Beastie Boys photographing their performances and occasionally appearing in their videos.

== Early life ==
Powell was born on November 20, 1961, in Brooklyn, New York City. His mother, Ruth Powell, was a school teacher and did not know who his father was. It is noted that his mother was a frequent visitor to downtown clubs and would have Powell accompany her as a child. He grew up in Greenwich Village while spending two years between 1973 and 1975 living on the Upper West Side. Powell attended PS 41 with Rachael Horovitz, sister to Adam Horovitz, later known as Ad-Rock of the Beastie Boys.

Powell graduated with an AA in Liberal Arts from LaGuardia Community College and a B.S. in Physical Education from Hunter College.

== Career ==
Powell started out by selling Frozade (lemon ice drink) in the streets of New York City after graduating from college. During this time he started photography as a hobby, taking pictures of friends and family. He credits a break-up with a girlfriend in 1985 with his taking up photography as a serious vocation. During this time he photographed artists including Jean-Michel Basquiat and Andy Warhol in the streets of New York City.

=== Beastie Boys ===
In 1986, Powell quit his job and tagged along with Beastie Boys on their Run-DMC's Raising Hell tour. Some of the photographs that he took while on tour became significant, and Powell gained fame, becoming the unofficial "fourth Beastie Boy". He toured with the group as Def Jam Records' de facto in-house photographer on their Licensed to Ill tour in 1987 and Together Forever: Greatest Hits 1983–1991 tour with Run DMC and then again in 1992 on their Check Your Head tour and the 1994 Lollapalooza. Powell is mentioned by name in the song "Car Thief" on the Paul's Boutique album, with the lyrics: "Homeboy throw in the towel, Your girl got dicked by Ricky Powell." After being by the group's side for over a decade, he separated in 1995 as the group was changing their style moving away from a rowdy tenor from their early days. Powell would say in a documentary that the group matured, while he continued to remain his old self.

Powell maintained a positive relationship with the Beastie Boys, including photographing them for Interview magazine in 2011.

=== Television ===
Powell was the host of the public-access television show, Rappin' With the Rickster from 1990 to 1996. In the show, he interviewed Russell Simmons, Doug E Fresh, Harold Hunter, Kool Keith, Rahzel, Laurence Fishburne, and Cypress Hill. He became the face of New York City's downtown party scene, connected to both musical and visual artists such as Sonic Youth, Jean-Michel Basquiat, Russell Simmons, Harold Hunter, Dondi White, and Sofia Coppola. He gave insights into the artistic phenomena of the day, with a combination of candid footage, impromptu interviews, and a vision of Powell's New York City. Powell considered the show "a time capsule of someone growing up in Manhattan during that era and being around the music scene".

A DVD of Rappin' With the Rickster, released in 2010, was declared a must-have by Juxtapoz.

=== Books ===
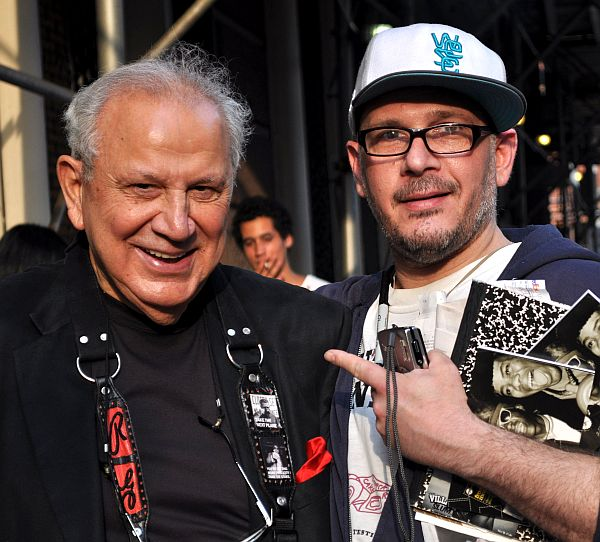
Powell and paparazzo Ron Galella in 2010

Powell's first book, The Rap Photography of Ricky Powell! (1998) was a ten-year retrospective of photographs of rap and hip hop artists. The book consisted of 88 photographs including 53 in color. The Rickford Files: Classic New York Photographs (2000), his second book featured what he considered "the real New York", beyond the tourist glaze of Times Square and the deteriorating Greenwich Village.

Frozade Moments: Classic Street Photography of Ricky Powell (2004) was a book of postcards consisting of candid snapshots of celebrities, local luminaries, and low-lifes that offer a view of New York City. The celebrities featured included Madonna, Jam Master Jay, KRS-One, Frankie Crocker, Andy Warhol and Flavor Flav.

Public Access: Ricky Powell Photographs 1985–2005 (2005) included two decades of documenting much of the early era of hip-hop and presenting the actors, musicians, performers, and artists that inspired him, including Method Man, Doze Green, Bill Adler, Slick Rick, Run-DMC, Eric B & Rakim, Keith Haring, Steven Tyler, Barbara Walters, Cindy Crawford, Eazy-E, and Fab Five Freddy. These photographs are distributed amongst graffiti splattered renderings by Lee Quiñones, Ron Galella, Ron English, and others. Powell attempted to bring in a nostalgic feel to New York City with appearances from Zephyr, Charlie Ahearn, Glenn O'Brien, and Zoe Cassavetes.

He was the central character in Ricky Powell: The Individualist (2017), by Bill Adler, and Nemo Librizzi, who documented Powell's work as a street photographer capturing the intersection of popular culture movements including hip-hop, pop art, graffiti, and punk rock. The book included portraits of artists including Beastie Boys, Run-DMC, LL Cool J, Andy Warhol, Basquiat, Keith Haring in addition to common people.

=== Documentary ===
Powell was the subject of the 2020 documentary film, Ricky Powell: The Individualist, which captures his career and life with celebrities. It is directed by Josh Swade and written by Christopher McGlynn and Swade.

=== Exhibitions ===
Powell's works were featured both domestically and internationally in solo and group exhibitions. Frozade Moments, 1985–2003 ran at Bill Adler's Eyejammie Fine Arts Gallery in New York City from July through September 2003. Public Access: Ricky Powell Photographs 1985–2005 was exhibited at the colette in Paris, the powerHouse Gallery in New York City, Milk Bar in San Francisco, and Lab 101 Gallery in Los Angeles. His photographs and his street style were exhibited at Brave Art, Whistler in 2006. The Ricky Powell Art Funk Explosion! was shown at Sacred Gallery New York City in December 2010, along with Powell's guest curation of Frank Chapter 43: Bug Out!, which highlights his photographs and interviews with street artists. His slideshow at New York City's All Tomorrow's Parties music festival was reported on by Billboard.

=== Group exhibitions ===
Powell's hip hop images (along with works by artists Janette Beckman, Barron Claiborne and Danny Clinch, appeared in the collective photography book Contact High: A Visual History of Hip-Hop (written/curated by Vikki Tobak) and its subsequent series of large scale traveling group exhibitions which has included The Annenberg Space for Photography (Los Angeles), International Center of Photography (New York) and Abu Dhabi at Manarat Al Saadiyat (United Arab Emirates).

Powell considered the relationship between the photographer and the photograph to be "a chemical connection of some sort". Later in life, he was more likely to "photograph strangers in his Greenwich Village neighborhood than multi platinum hip-hop acts and Downtown art stars".

== Death ==
Powell died on February 1, 2021 in Manhattan. A statement from his manager confirmed his death from heart failure at 59. In honor of his legacy, there have been efforts made by the Ricky Powell Estate to dedicate a bench in Washington Square Park to Ricky, serving as a tribute to his lasting influence on New York City's artistic and musical communities.
