= Matt Gunther =

Matt Gunther may refer to:

- Matt Gunther (photographer)
- Matt Gunther (actor)
