= Mike Miller (photographer) =

American Photographer

- Born: 1964 (age 61–62); Los Angeles, U.S.
- Occupations: Photographer; director
- Years active: 1985–present
- Website: mikemillerphoto.com

Mike Miller (born 1964) is American photographer and director from Los Angeles, California specializing in street imagery and portraiture. His subjects frequently include internationally renowned Hip-hop musicians, among them; Eazy-E, Snoop Dogg and Tupac Shakur, A$AP Rocky, Kendrick Lamar and Drake. He has photographed the heavy metal band Pantera, Deftones, Nick Cave, and jazz legends Herb Alpert and Stan Getz. His work has appeared in dozens of major exhibitions and the books Ice Cold. A Hip-Hop Jewelry History and Contact High: A Visual History of Hip-Hop.

== Contact High: A Visual History of Hip-Hop (2018) ==
In 2018, Miller photographs of Tupac, Snoop Dogg and Westside Connection ( Ice Cube, Mack 10, and WC) were featured in the Random House volume Contact High: A Visual History of Hip-Hop and its several corresponding exhibitions held at the Museum of Pop Culture in Seattle, the International Center of Photography in New York, Sole DXB Gallery Gallery in Dubai, Annenberg Space for Photography (Los Angeles),

== Californian Love Exhibit (2018) ==
Also in 2018, Miller made his first solo showing (at M+B Photo, Los Angeles). The show included some of Miller's known images of artists such as Tupac, Snoop Dogg, Eazy-E, along with unedited photographs depicting the time, culture and community that gave birth to West Coast rap.

== Ice Cold. A Hip-Hop Jewelry History (2022) ==
In 2022, Mike Miller's photographs were featured within (and on the cover of) the book Ice Cold. A Hip-Hop Jewelry History by Vikki Tobak (published by Taschen).

His work was also predominantly featured in Ice Cold's accompanying museum show held from May 9, 2024 – January 5, 2025 at the Allison and Roberto Mignone Halls of Gems and Minerals within the American Museum of Natural History in New York City. It was considered by Vogue, the first major show to celebrate and contextualize the custom bling.

Other exhibitions Miller has participated in have been hosted by venues including; Fotografiska New York, Fotografiska Berlin, Fotografiska Sweden, and the Tunnel Gallery in Paris.

His photographs have also been acquired by the New York Public Library, the Oakland Museum of California, the Smithsonian Institution, the J. Paul Getty Museum, and the Rock and Roll Hall of Fame and the House of Photography in Sweden.

== Early career ==
A third-generation Angeleno, attending high school in Santa Monica and graduating from UCLA in the mid-1980s, Miller spent his early years inspired by the skateboarding, surfing, and film industries in his own hometown.

His first camera was a gift from Linda Evangelista, a device that had previous belonged to Peter Lindberg.

After heading to Europe to pursue fashion photography, Miller soon returned to LA and found himself at the center of the booming music industry, he became heavily involved with as a photographer.

In 1989, he photographed the album cover for former N.W.A. member Arabian Prince, his first work related to hip hop. It was a turning point in his career, more urban music record cover work followed.

== Books ==
=== West Coast Hip-Hop: A History in Pictures (2012) ===
Released in 2012, this volume includes rare Miller imagery of Snoop Dogg, Tupac, Arabian Prince, Red Foo and Dre Kroon, and the Hieroglyphics.

=== Outtakes & Icons: Four Decades (2025) ===
In 2025, Mike Miller's released book Outtakes & Icons: Four Decades which features a foreword by Public Enemy’s Chuck D. and never-before-seen Miller photographs spanning four decades – including Tupac Shakur, Eazy-E, A$AP Rocky, Doja Cat, 21 Savage, Deftones, Nick Cave, Herb Alpert, Stan Getz, Jeremy Allen White, and outtakes from Stüssy’s first streetwear campaign in 1990.

== Personal life ==
Miller continues to live in Los Angeles with his wife, daughters, and grandchildren.
