= B+ (photographer) =

Irish photographer (born 1966)

- Born: Brian Cross; 1966 (age 59–60); Limerick, Ireland
- Occupations: Photographer, filmmaker
- Website: www.mochilla.com/bplus/

Brian Cross (born in 1966), better known as B+ (sometimes stylized as B Plus), is an Irish photographer and filmmaker based in Los Angeles, California. He is a co-founder of Mochilla, a film and music production company. He predominantly photographed the Los Angeles' hip hop scene in the 1990s as well as helped create album art for a number of artists including Q-Tip, Eazy-E, Damian Marley, DJ Shadow, and J Dilla.

== Biography ==
Brian Cross was born and raised in Limerick, Ireland. He became infatuated with hip hop upon hearing Schoolly D and Public Enemy in the late 1980s. In 1989, he earned a degree in painting from the National College of Art and Design in Dublin. He moved to Los Angeles, California in 1990 to attend the California Institute of the Arts. He quickly became entranced by Los Angeles' underground hip hop scene.

In 1993, he published It's Not About a Salary: Rap, Race and Resistance in Los Angeles, which was a book of essays, interviews, and photography. It featured conversations with and photographs of The Watts Prophets, Toddy Tee, Dr. Dre, Eazy-E, Ice Cube, Cypress Hill, and Freestyle Fellowship. In 2014, he was listed on Complex's "15 Rap Photographers Every Rap Fan Should Know" list.

In 2017, he published Ghostnotes: Music of the Unplayed, which featured the faces of artists such as J Dilla, Brian Wilson, Leon Ware, George Clinton, and The Notorious B.I.G.

In 2018 several early hip hop images by Cross were published in Contact High: A Visual History of Hip-Hop, by Vikki Tobak. In April 2019, the book was transformed into a full-size museum exhibit at The Annenberg Space for Photography in Los Angeles. In the months before and during the exhibition Cross served on several group discussion and lecture panels regarding the show. His images in the book and exhibit feature artists Goodie Mobb and Ol' Dirty Bastard. In the book, as referenced in a review published by The New Yorker in November 2018, Cross recollected how timid Ol' Dirty Bastard was when asked by Cross to place his hands over the bare breasts of a model for the photograph, an obvious parody of Janet Jackson's controversial September 16, 1993 Rolling Stone cover.

== Books ==
- It's Not About a Salary: Rap, Race and Resistance in Los Angeles (1993, Verso Books)
- Ghostnotes: Music of the Unplayed (2017, University of Texas Press)
