= Swade =

Swade is a surname. Notable people with the surname include:

- Doron Swade (born 1944), South African–British museum curator
- Josh Swade (fl. 2005–present), American documentary filmmaker

== See also ==
- Swades, 2004 Hindi film
- Savage Worlds Adventure Edition, a 2018 release of the Savage Worlds role-playing game
