= Young American Recordings =

Defunct American record label

- Founded: 2004
- Founder: Josh Swade; Rocco Giordano
- Status: Inactive
- Distributor: Navarre (North America)
- Official website: Young American Recordings

Young American Recordings was an American record label based in New York City. Founded by Rocco Giordano of Kinetic Records and Josh Swade of Maverick Records, it was an independent label that included groups such as British rock band South and worked with other popular groups such as Scottish punk band APB.

== History ==
Young American Recordings was founded in 2004 by Rocco Giordano and Josh Swade, formerly of Kinetic and Maverick Records respectively. The label initially began with the group Orange Park, releasing the groups' 2005 album Songs For The Unknown. Based in New York City, Young American Recordings rose to prominence in the mid 2000s behind the rock band South.

Young American was responsible for the 2006 reissue of APB's seminal debut album Something To Believe In, originally released by Red River Records in 1985. It was released as a 20th anniversary edition to the original album and contained tracks that were previously unreleased. APB reunited for two stateside tours to promote the reissue of the album. Young American subsequently released APB's BBC Radio 1 Sessions the same year. The label released music from the New Zealand band The Phoenix Foundation and produced the Eagle vs Shark Soundtrack, which was scored by the band. In 2007, the label also released the soundtrack for the HBO Documentary Film The Trials of Darryl Hunt, containing artists such as Andrew Bird and Mark Kozelek.

=== Select artists ===
- Orange Park
- South
- The Phoenix Foundation
- APB
- The Silver State
