= Barron Claiborne =

American photographer and cinematographer

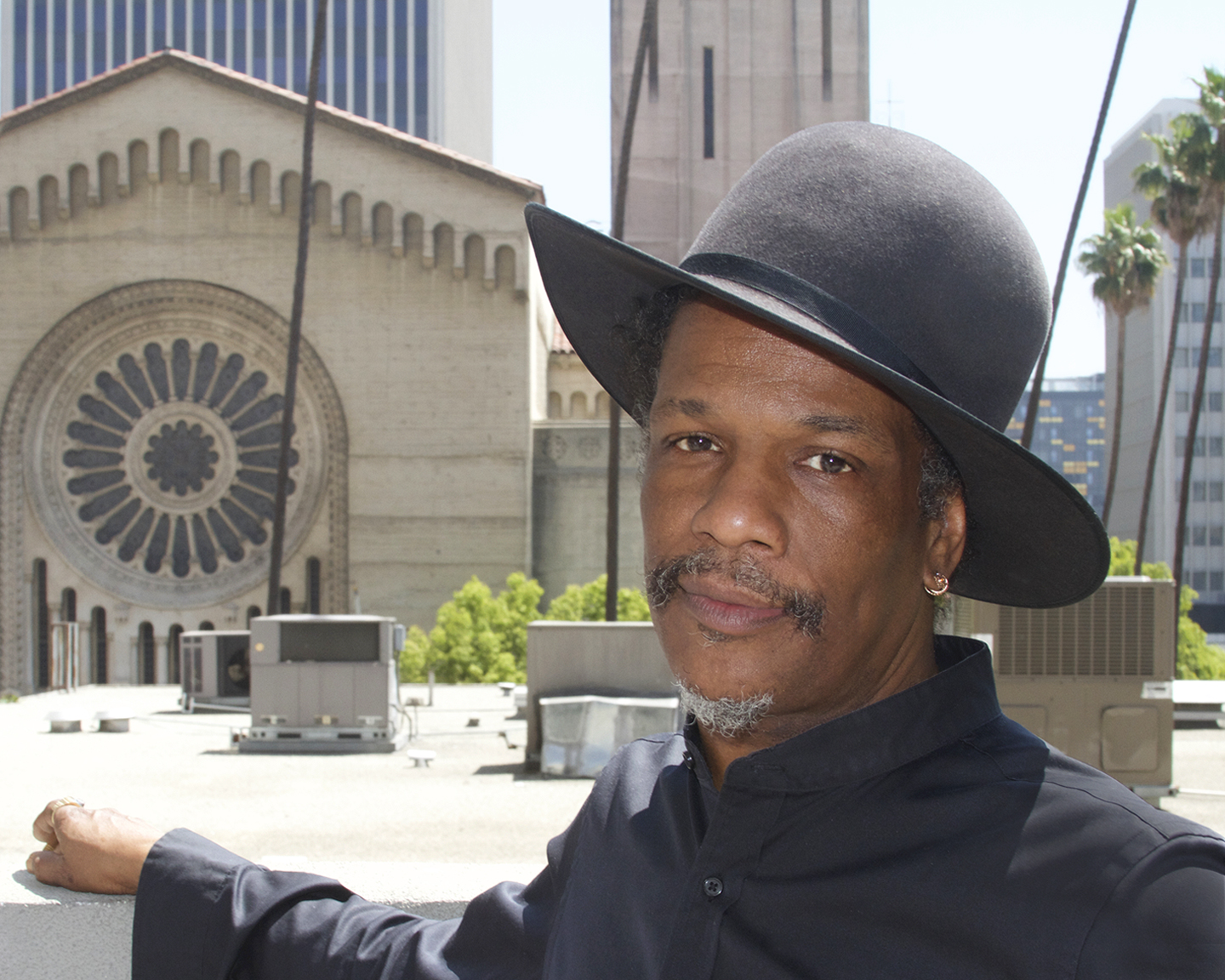
- Claiborne in 2019
- Born: 1967 (age 58–59); Boston, Massachusetts, U.S.
- Known for: Photography

Barron Claiborne (born 1967) is an American photographer and cinematographer who grew up in Boston, Massachusetts. He began taking photographs at the age of ten. After moving to New York in 1989 he began assisting established photographers such as; Richard Avedon, Irving Penn, Saint Claire Born, and Richard Numeroff. His photographic mentor, was Gordon Parks.

Claiborne's portraits of musicians have been published in hundreds of publications, such as his image of DJ Khaled that appeared on the September 2016 cover of Paper magazine. His work has also appeared on dozens of record covers including; Tricky's Angels with Dirty Faces and N'Dea Davenport's album Bring It On.

== Collections and Exhibitions (selection) ==
His fine art images are in permanent collections around the world including the Polaroid Museum in Cambridge, the Brooklyn Museum, the Museum of Fine Arts, Houston, the Pérez Art Museum Miami, and MoCADA. His work has been shown in Paris, Martha's Vineyard, and Art Basel. In 2012, Claiborne received a grant from The National Endowment for the Arts and the following year received a grant from Creative Time.

== "The King of New York" ==
Wallace in the iconic King of New York photograph by Barron Claiborne, taken three days before his death in March 1997

One of Claiborne's most significant achievements in the urban music community is a series of portraits of The Notorious B.I.G wearing a plastic gold crown in front of a deep red backdrop. The pictures were made in Claiborne's New York studio in March 1997, only three days before the rapper's untimely death in Los Angeles, resulting from a drive-by shooting. The most known image from the series entitled "The King of New York," is one photograph from a couple of dozen images of the rapper from the photo session. Most of these other photographs from the session had never been seen by the public before being included in the 2018 book Contact High: A Visual History of Hip-Hop. In a 2019 exhibit based upon the book, (hosted by The Annenberg Space for Photography in Los Angeles), an entire installation of this memorable photo session was constructed. In addition to a 100 cm x 150 cm print of the principal image, the museum exhibit installation of "The King of New York" featured one of The Notorious B.I.G's music videos playing on a small screen alongside of two enlarged contact prints as well as the original two-dollar plastic crown that Claiborne had purchased specifically for the shoot, displayed in a glass jewel case as if it was made of real gold.

In an interview given to undiscovermusic.com in 2019, Contact High's's creator and curator Vikki Tobak described the King of New York image as, 'the Mona Lisa of hip hop'.' And added “It is a defining photo when you think of Biggie."

On September 15, 2020, the plastic costume crown that Claiborne had purchased for six dollars to use in the King of New York photo series was auctioned at Sotheby's in New York City as part of a hip-hop auction collection. The crown was sold for $594,750. The photo shoot featuring the crown had been made for Rap Pages magazine. Having purchased two crowns prior to Small's arrival at the studio, Claiborne discovered that both were too small for Biggie's head, though he was able to use one by removing its foam padding. Sean "Diddy" Combs, then CEO of label Bad Boy Records, was also present at the 1997 photo session. Combs voiced concerns that the photographs would make the rapper look like an ad for Burger King, but both Mr. Claiborne and Biggie Smalls disregarded his comments and proceeded with the pictures.

== Solo exhibitions ==
- 2018 – Barron Claiborne Illuminados (Santos Negros) "The Luminous Black Saints" (Curated By Rebecca Pietri)
- 2019 – Bishop Gallery - Bedford-Stuyvesant

== Group exhibitions ==
- 2001 – Brooklyn Museum of Art "Body and Soul" (Curated by Barbara Head Millstein)

== Books ==
- Contact High: A Visual History of Hip Hop (1993, Clarkson Potter)
