= Southern Rites =

American documentary film

- Directed by: Gillian Laub
- Written by: Josh Alexandert
- Produced by: Gillian Laub; Josh Alexander
- Cinematography: Gillian Laub
- Edited by: Nancy Novack; Joel Plotch
- Music by: Joel Goodman
- Production company: Group Effort Films
- Distributed by: HBO
- Release date: May 18, 2015
- Running time: 90 minutes
- Country: United States
- Language: English

Southern Rites is a 2015 American documentary film directed and produced by photographer Gillian Laub. The film documents segregated high school proms in Montgomery County and the 2011 killing of Justin Patterson, a 22-year-old African American man, in nearby Toombs County. The film premiered on HBO on May 18, 2015, with John Legend, Troy Carter, and Mike Jackson serving as executive producers. The film received a nomination for a Humanitas Prize for the documentary.

== Synopsis ==
The documentary follows residents of southeastern Georgia after the integration of the area's formerly segregated high school proms.

The storyline also focuses on the killing of Justin Patterson, who was shot by Norman Neesmith, a white resident of Toombs County, in 2011. The film also narrate the local disagreements over the circumstances of the shooting and the legal proceedings. The film follows the case through a plea agreement and sentencing.

The documentary also follows Calvin Burns, an African American police chief campaigning to become the county's first Black sheriff. The election and the criminal case form the principal narratives of the film.

== Production ==
Southern Rites was Gillian Laub's first feature-length documentary. She directed, produced, and photographed the film, which grew out of her work in Georgia beginning in 2002. Josh Alexander wrote and produced the film. John Legend, Troy Carter, and Mike Jackson served as executive producers with Group Effort Films serving as a production company.

== Release ==
Southern Rites premiered on HBO on May 18, 2015, with a runtime of 90 minutes. Women Make Movies distributes the film for educational and institutional screenings.

== Reception ==
Critical reception of Southern Rites was generally positive. Neil Genzlinger of The New York Times described the film as “riveting,” praising its understated approach to the racial divisions underlying the segregated proms and the events surrounding Justin Patterson's death.

Robert Lloyd of the Los Angeles Times praised Laub for allowing residents to express conflicting views rather than directing the audience toward a single interpretation.
