= APB (band) =

Scottish post-punk band

- Origin: Ellon, Aberdeenshire, Scotland
- Genres: Alternative rock, indie rock, post-punk
- Years active: 1979–present
- Label: Young American Recordings
- Past members: George Cheyne; Glenn Roberts; Iain Slater; Nick Jones; Mikey Craighead; Neil Innes; Bruce Clark; Del Guapo

APB is a Scottish post-punk band, formed in 1979, that blended funk rock, punk rock and new wave music.

== History ==
=== 1979–1982 ===
APB formed in the small rural town of Ellon, Aberdeenshire, Scotland, and consisted of singer/bassist Iain Slater, guitarist Glenn Roberts, and drummer George Cheyne.

Though living in a remote area, they took inspiration from the "DIY" spirit of the punk scene, sounding like bands as Liquid Liquid, adopting a hard-working approach to writing, rehearsing and performing. Meanwhile, in Aberdeen, a small independent record company called Oily had started to release records and they were impressed enough by the band's live shows to release a single in 1981. The song was "Chain Reaction", which had long been a favourite at gigs. It was a two and a half minute punk/pop song with fuzzy distorted guitar and Scottish inflected vocals, but already the band was evolving with a sparser and more rhythmical sound. Bootsy Collins, George Clinton, Gang of Four, ESG, Buzzcocks, and The Clash were all filtered through three teenagers from Aberdeenshire to create a catchy, rhythmic sound.

A change in their sound first became evident with their second single for Oily, "Shoot You Down" (1981). The single did well and sold out its first pressing, with some copies finding their way to New York City. Soon it was regularly played at most of NYC's underground dance clubs. Adam Horovitz described the song in 'Beastie Boy Book' as 'a punk dance-floor classic. I love it.'

Unaware of the popularity of “Shoot You Down” in the United States, the band and Oily were busy pushing their third seven-inch, "Palace Filled With Love" (1982). This is when the Radio 1 sessions began. John Peel and David Kid Jensen (and lastly Peter Powell) were playing the tunes nightly and offering sessions despite the lack of a major record deal. After recording several BBC sessions, APB had some success in Europe.

Their next release was "Rainy Day" in 1982. Around this time Nick Jones joined as percussionist. The last release with Oily Records was "One Day" in 1983. Nick Jones left at this time and was replaced by Mickey Craighead.

=== 1983–1991 ===
The band did a small tour of the East Coast of America. "What Kind of Girl" followed up in 1984. The seventh and eighth singles "Summer Love" and "Something to Believe In" came out in 1985. In between USA trips, the band travelled to London to record their first BBC session for John Peel. He was full of enthusiasm for the band and gave their next single, "Rainy Day" (1982), loads of plays.

Nick Jones joined in 1982 playing percussion (later to be replaced by Mikey Craighead), adding another dimension to the proceedings. The band then went to NYC to record another single at PlazaSound on the seventh floor of Radio City.

The autumn of the same year, Mark Beaven of AAM, New York City made contact with Oily to enquire about the availability of APB for a small tour of the East Coast of America. When they arrived in New York they heard their tracks played on college radio and in clubs such as Danceteria, Berlin and the Mudd Club. This was encouraging, and the tour was a great success. With the backing of Mark Beaven, this turned out to be the first of 12 visits over the next seven years. The band's sixth single "What Kind of Girl" (1984) came out on Albion in the UK and "Sleeping Bag Records" in the USA. It was recorded at Unique in Manhattan, home of the electro/hip-hop producers Arthur Baker and John Robie. The track received much radio play, especially on WLIR/WDRE on Long Island.

During this time US tours were becoming more extensive and audiences were increasing with the Ritz in Manhattan being a regular high point in the proceedings. APB's seventh release was "Summer Love" (1985) on their own Red River Label, quickly followed by "Something to Believe In" (1985). By now, the band had released eight singles, many of which were hard to find and were only available on import in the USA. At this point Link (NYC) released the much sought after compilation of the singles as a first LP release simply called "Something to Believe In" (1985). After this, "Cure for the Blues" was released as the first full album Then, "Open your eyes," "When I feel this way" and "Funk invective" were all released as 12 inch singles. The final release on Link records was the CD version of "Something to believe in."

During the 1980s, APB was one of the most popular underground alternative bands in the New York Tri-State area. Thanks to constant radio play on WLIR 92.7 FM on Long Island and New York college radio, the Scottish band made its mark with funky bass.

In 1985, Something to Believe In, their first LP with Link Records, was released. They toured and opened for The Clash and James Brown and eventually headlined at various New York clubs including NYC's The Ritz, Irving Plaza and Long Island's now defunct Club Malibu. The following year in 1986 "Cure for the Blues", was released. A four-song EP, "Missing You Already", also came out that same year.

The group continued to play on and off during the mid-1980s and early 1990s, releasing the anthemic Funk Invective and playing one-off shows to fund a new, edgier ensemble called "Loveless", releasing the "Nappy" EP in 1993. Iain Slater went on to play in Poptones act Pablo whilst working as the live engineer for acts such as Space, Keane, Regular Fries and more recently Pete Doherty. The band reverted to its original line up of Iain, Glenn, and George playing one-off shows in NY and Aberdeen in 2006.

=== 1990–2007 ===
Not long after issuing the CDs, Link Records went out of business. There was a demand for APB's music in CD format but no supply. Fans searched in vain for downloads or CDs of the band's music, but to no avail as they were out of print.

In February 2006, Josh Swade's New York label Young American Recordings made the decision to reissue APB's debut, Something to Believe In: 20th Anniversary Edition which includes a second CD with live and studio material that has never been available before. In March 2006, The Radio 1 Sessions, the complete BBC recordings was also reissued by Young American Recordings.

== Band members ==
- George Cheyne - drums
- Glenn Roberts - guitar
- Iain Slater - bass, vocals
- Nick Jones - percussionist (1982–1983)
- Mickey Craighead - percussionist
- Neil Innes - keyboard
- Bruce Clark - bass guitar
- Del Guapo - guitar/bass/percussion
- Stuart Brown - guitar
- John Russell - drums
- Johnny Previty - percussion/keyboard/bass

== Discography ==
=== Singles ===
- "Chain Reaction", 1981, Oily Records
- "Shoot You Down", 1981, Oily Records [UK-Indie No. 6]
- "Palace Filled with Love", 1982, Oily Records
- "Rainy Day", 1982, Oily Records
- "One Day", 1983, Oily Records
- "What Kind of Girl", 1984, Sleeping Bag Records
- "Summer Love", 1985, Red River Records
- "Something to Believe In", 1985, Red River Records
- "Open Your Eyes", 1986, Red River Records

=== EP releases ===
- Danceability (Albion Records 1984) [UK-Indie No. 25]
- Missing You Already (Red River 1986)
- When I Feel This Way (Link records 1987)
- Funk Invective (Link records 1988)

=== Major albums ===
- Something to Believe In (Link Records 1985)
- Cure for the Blues (Link Records 1986)
- Something to Believe In: 20th Anniversary Edition (Young American Recordings 2006)
- The Radio 1 Sessions (Young American Recordings 2006)
- Three (Red River Records 2007)
