= One & Done (film) =

- Directed by: Maura Mandt; Josh Swade
- Produced by: Anthony Behn; Rebecca Gitlitz
- Starring: Ben Simmons; Dave Simmons; Julie Simmons
- Cinematography: Anthony Behn
- Edited by: Josh Glaser; Chris Iversen; David Lieberman; Christopher McGlynn
- Music by: Khari Mateen
- Distributed by: Showtime
- Release date: November 4, 2016
- Running time: 91 minutes
- Countries: United States; Australia
- Language: English

One & Done is a documentary film about Australian basketball player Ben Simmons and his journey from high school to being selected as the number one pick in the 2016 NBA draft. In the film Simmons is critical of the NCAA and how it treats its athletes and how it looks down on so-called "one and done" athletes. The film premiered on Showtime on November 4, 2016.

== Summary ==
The film chronicles the journey of number one NBA draft pick Ben Simmons, from a relatively anonymous Australian upbringing to high school and college in the United States, to the top of the top of the rookie class in the NBA. It captures Simmons and his inner circle as they realize a lifelong dream, while revealing a college life at Louisiana State University no one outside of Simmons' inner circle and the university had previously known about. Simmons discusses how he really didn't have any friends at LSU, aside from only a few of the basketball team, and being bombarded with requests for photos and signatures from his classmates at the university. Simmons was also extremely critical on the NCAA and paying athletes, which he strongly believes they should do. He says, "[LSU] can't expect me to act like everyone else if they don't treat me like everyone else." Simmons disagrees with the NCAA and the colleges with branding him and other student athletes and making money off of them while the athletes themselves do not receive any compensation. The film chronicles the team's struggles on the court, and culminates with the Philadelphia 76ers' selection of Simmons as the first overall pick in the 2016 NBA draft.

== Reception ==
Forbes called Simmons half right and said the one and done rule is not the main problem.

== See also ==
- Eligibility for the NBA draft
- List of basketball films
