= Matt Gunther (actor) =

American pornographic actor and model (1963–1997)

- Born: Steven Matthew Lang; May 28, 1963; Garden Grove, California, U.S.
- Died: May 27, 1997 (aged 33); Huntington Beach, California, U.S.
- Other name: Steve Lang
- Occupations: Actor; model
- Years active: 1988–1995
- Agent: Falcon Studios

Matt Gunther (born Steven Matthew Lang; May 28, 1963 – May 27, 1997) was an American pornographic actor who became a prominent star in gay adult cinema during the late 1980s and 1990s. Of mixed Mexican heritage, he was noted for breaking into mainstream gay adult studios at a time when Latino performers were often limited to niche "B-list" labels.

== Early life ==
Born in Garden Grove, California, Gunther was known in his personal life as Steve Lang. He moved to West Hollywood in 1988 at age 25 to pursue a career in adult film.

== Career ==
Gunther debuted in 1989, notably appearing in To the Bone (1990). He quickly rose to fame, working with the industry's most influential studios, including Falcon Studios, Vivid Video, and Catalina. Throughout his career, he appeared in approximately thirty films. Some of his most recognized performances include Powerful (1989), a sequel to Powertool starring Jeff Stryker, Abduction (1990), a BDSM production by Falcon, Idol Eyes (1990), featuring Ryan Idol, Buttbusters (1992), Straight to the Zone (1993). He became a fixture of the West Hollywood scene and was recognized for his athleticism and screen presence.

Beyond acting, Gunther was a frequent model for gay and adult magazines, recognized for his "boyish yet muscular" look.

== Personal life ==
In his final year, he became an advocate for AIDS awareness, serving as a presenter at the 1996 Probe Awards and participating in the West Hollywood Gay Pride parade on an AIDS hospice float.

== Death ==
Due to deteriorating health, he was reportedly cared for in an assisted-living facility funded by the state of California toward the end of his life. He died of heart failure related to AIDS complications on May 27, 1997, in Huntington Beach, California, just one day before his 34th birthday. Following his death, he was cremated and his ashes were scattered at sea.

== Filmography ==
=== Film ===
Year	Title	Role	Notes
1989	Powerful Sex, Stryker's Best	Matt	Debut
1989	Screwing Screw Ups	Matt	
1990	On the Rocks!	Lover Boy	
1990	Stranded: Enemies and Lovers	Michael	
1990	Deep Inside Jon Vincent	Mike	
1990	To the Bone	John	
1990	Hole in One	Steven	
1990	Big Bang	Matt	
1990	Gay XXX Superstars of the 1990's	Matt	
1990	Inside Exposé	Matt	
1990	1st Mate	Lover	
1990	Idol Eyes	Beautiful Boy	
1991	The Long Hot Summer 2	Vacation Boy	
1991	Muscle Bound Men 2	John	
1991	Golden Boys (HS): Hot Shots 44	Matt	
1991	Cruisin' 2: More Men on the Make	Matt	
1991	The Abduction 1	Matt	
1992	The Best of Joey Stefano	Matt	
1992	Grand Prize	Latino Guy	
1992	Mandriven	Latino Guy	
1992	Man in Motion	Jeffery	
1992	Into the Night	Cullen	
1992	My Cousin Danny	Danny's Cousin	
1992	Les Hommes	Matt	
1992	Raising Hell	Matt	
1992	Straight to the Zone	Michael	
1992	Bondage Reunion 2	Rob	
1992	Steamy Bondage Hardons	Andrew	
1993	Full Length	Barry	
1993	Model Behavior	Ryan	
1993	The Challenge	Matt	
1993	Backdoor Men 1	Matt	
1993	Men of Size 2	Spanish Boy	
1993	One More Time	Matt	
1993	Giants 2	Tommy	
1993	Cum-a-thon	Matt	
1994	Skin Art Studs	James	
1994	Boot Black 1	Taylor	
1994	By Invitation Only	Matt	
1994	Dreaming in Blue	Mike	
1994	Cool Hand Dick	Ken	
1994	Marked Men	Matt	
1994	Men with Tools 1	Boy	
1994	Mean Streak	Matt	
1994	The Best of Joey Stefano	Matt	
1994	Slave Auction	Handsome Slave Boy	
1994	Muscle Beach Boys 3	Beach Boy	
1994	Beach Bums 1	Surfer	
1995	Horse Hung	Matt	
1995	Long Play	Francis	
1995	Water Boys 4	Clark	
1995	Sausage Safari	Hook-Up	
1995	Beach Bums 2	Surfer Boy	
1995	Hot & Hung 3	Friend	
1995	Stuf'd	Matt Gunther	
1997	Catalina 3 For All	Matt	Posthumous release
1997	Big As This Box 3	Matt	Posthumous release
1997	Big As This Box 7	Matt	Posthumous release
1997	Water Weinie 2	Matt	Posthumous release
1997	Bottom Boy Bonanza	Matt	Posthumous release
1998	Russell The Wonder Muscle	Matt	Posthumous release
1998	Matt Gunther and Friends	Matt	Posthumous release
1999	Sling Shots	Matt	Posthumous release
2000	Director's Best: Chi Chi Larue 2	Matt	Posthumous release
2000	Night Stick	Matt	Posthumous release
2003	9 Inch Males	Matt	Posthumous release
2004	Size Matters 1	Matt	Posthumous release
2004	Size Queens	Matt	Posthumous release
2004	Penis Flytrap	Chris	Posthumous release
2004	Slings & Things, Vivid's	Matt	Posthumous release
2005	Mister Meatman	Matt	Posthumous release
2005	Water Logged	Matt	Posthumous release
2006	Bear Tales 1	Matt	Posthumous release
2008	Best of the 1980s 1	Matt	Posthumous release
2009	The Best of Matt Gunther	Matt Gunther	Posthumous release
2009	The Best of Chad Knight	Matt	Posthumous release
2011	The Best of Danny Somers	Matt	Posthumous release
2013	My Big Fucking Dick 16: Brad Mitchell	Matt	Posthumous release
2013	The Best of Chris Stone	Matt	Posthumous release
2019	Retro Dudes Dirty Deeds 1	Handsome Guy	Posthumous release
2020	Super Studs of Yesteryear 1	Matt	Posthumous release
2021	Best of Manville Retro	Matt	Posthumous release

== Awards and nominations ==
Name of the award ceremony, year presented, category, nominee of the award, and the result of the nomination
Award ceremony	Year	Category	Nominee / Work	Result	Ref.
Gay Erotic Video Awards	1992	Best Actor	Biggest Bitch on the Set	Won	
Men in Video Awards	1997	Porn Legend	Contribution to Porn Cinema	Won	
