= Jayson Keeling =

American artist (1966–2022)

Jayson Keeling (1966–2022) was an artist who worked in photography, video, sculpture, and installation. Keeling's work challenges conventional norms surrounding sex, gender, race, and religion. Keeling often reconfigured popular iconography, to explore notions of masculinity, and cultural ritual.

== Early life and education ==
Jayson Keeling was born in 1966 in Brooklyn, New York to Jamaican parents. Keeling's grew up between Jamaica and the Bronx, New York. His bi-cultural upbringing would later influence his work. Keeling graduated from the Fashion Institute of Technology in 1986 with an AA in Fashion Illustration and Art History. Keeling started off by working as a photographer and film director in fashion, music, film, and the pornography industry.

== Art ==
Jayson Keeling mines popular culture, and mythology to create artworks that question and deconstruct accepted politics of sex, gender, race, and religion. Keeling works in photography, video, sculpture, and installation.

His work often pulls from different visual cultures and then "jams them all into the same frame." Keeling often works in the realms in-between cultures, creating work that is "neither here nor there." He often uses performative gestures to explore ritual and masculinity.

Jayson Keeling's photographs have been described as violent, sexy, glam and grotesque.

A work by Keeling, a diptych of photographs of legendary dancer and choreographer, Willi Ninja, exhibited at the 2008 "The B Sides" show at Aljira, a Center for Contemporary Art was described by art critic Benjamin Genocchio as "one of the show's most arresting exhibits" in The New York Times.

== Selected exhibitions ==
2014

- Aljira at 30: Dream and Reality, New Jersey State Museum
- The First Sweet Music at John and June Allcott Gallery
- TEN at Cindy Rucker Gallery

2013

- Stars in My Pocket Like Grains of Sand Curated by Jayson Keeling at the Lower East Side Printshop.
- Another New York at Barclays Center
- Psychosexual at Andrew Rafacz Gallery

2012

- Bigger Than Shadows at DODGE Gallery
- tête-à-tête at Yancey Richardson Gallery
- tête-à-tête at Rhona Hoffman Gallery

2011

- Nov 2011 - Four Minutes, Thirty-Three Seconds at LegalArt
- See Jungle! See Jungle! Go Join Your Gang, Yeah. City All Over! Go Ape Crazy. at Third Streaming
- Seoul Food: apexart Outbound Residents Talk Shop at Apexart

2010

- Automatic For The People: John Ahearn and Rigoberto Torres at Aljira, a Center for Contemporary Art
- Bite:Street-inspired Art & Fashion at 3rd Streaming Gallery - 10 Green Street, 2nd FL
- Chapter Four: Let It Die at Lehmann Maupin - Chrystie Street
- Lush Life, Chapter Eight: 17 Plus 25 Is 32 at Scaramouche
- Lush Life at Collette Blanchard Gallery
- LUSH LIFE: WHISTLE at Sue Scott Gallery
- Jamaica Flux: Workspaces & Windows 2010 Art as Action at Jamaica Center for Arts and Learning
- CONVERSIONs | one-night stands at BronxArtSpace

2009

- Rockstone & Bootheel: Contemporary West Indian Art at Real Art Ways
- 99 44/100% Pure at Real Art Ways
- Everyman's an Angel at NY Studio Gallery
- PULSE at Taller Boricua Galleries at the Julia de Burgos Cultural Center
- resident/alien at Apexart
- Queens International 4 at Queens Museum of Art
- Perception As Object at Monya Rowe Gallery

2008

- VIDEOSTUDIO at Studio Museum in Harlem
- "Red badge of courage revisited" at Newark Arts Council,
- Strangers at Privateer
- “Homecoming” at ABC NO RIO
- Summer Mixed Tape Volume 1: the Get Smart Edition at Exit Art
- Intransit at Moti Hasson
- DEADLIEST CATCH: Hamptons at CORE : Hamptons

2007

- Sex in the City at The DUMBO Arts Center (DAC)
- The Wu-Tang / googolplex Show (Congress) at GBE@passerby
- Six Degrees of Separation at Paul Sharpe Contemporary Art
- AIM27 “Here and Elsewhere” at Bronx Museum of the Arts
