= Sue Kwon =

American journalist

- Education: Stanford University
- Occupations: journalist, public relations executive

Sue Kwon is a journalist and public relations and communications executive in San Francisco, California. Formerly, she served as Director of Communications for at Comcast Ventures, Gap, Inc., Symantec, Honor, and Nokia Technologies. Earlier in her career, Kwon was a reporter and news anchor for KRON, ABC News, NBC News, and CBS News.

== Career ==
Kwon started her journalism career as an intern in the White House Press Office under President George H. W. Bush.

=== Journalism ===
Between 1994 and 2010, Kwon served as a producer, reporter and news anchor for KRON and ABC News, NBC News, and CBS News stations in California, Texas, and Nevada. In 2000, Kwon reported on the Sydney 2000 Olympics from Australia. Kwon appeared as a newscaster in the 1995 film Bushwhacked.

=== Public relations ===
After her tenure as a journalist, Kwon transitioned into consumer communication at Gap Inc. in 2010 where she served as “Chief Storyteller” for the corporation including Gap, Banana Republic, Old Navy, Piperlime, and Athleta brands.

Kwon transitioned into the technology sector in 2013 to lead marketing and communications at Symantec, Honor, then Nokia Technologies. Kwon then served as Head of Communications for Comcast Ventures in San Francisco, California.

== Education ==
In 1990, Sue Kwon received a B.A. in Communications and Political Science from Stanford University. As a student, she was a writer for the Stanford Daily Newspaper.

== Awards ==
- In 2009, Kwon received the Associated Press prize for Best Serious Feature “Tuna Test: 20 Cans in 20 Days” an investigative story on mercury levels in canned tuna.
- In 2005 and 2007, Kwon received Emmy Awards for Outstanding Achievement in News Programming.
- In 2004, Sue Kwon received Honorable Mention for her work on CBS News at the Peninsula Press Club's 27th annual Greater Bay Area Journalism Awards.

== Personal ==
Kwon grew up in Clayton, California and currently lives in San Francisco, California.
