= Chris Buck (photographer) =

Canadian photographer

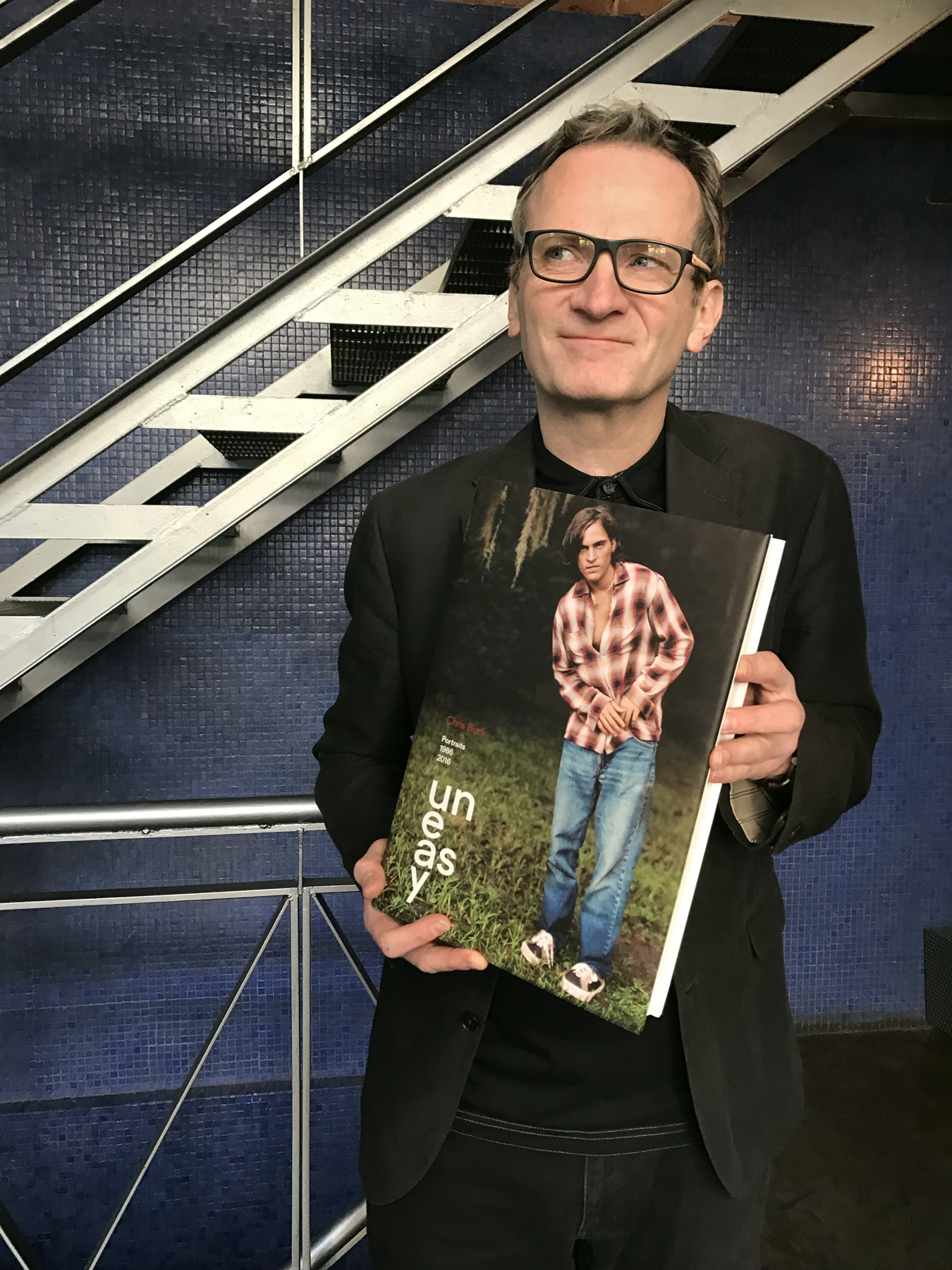
- Chris Buck holding preview copy of his second book, "Uneasy," December 21, 2016

Chris Buck (born July 29, 1964) is a New York-based photographer known for his unconventional portraits.

== Early life and career ==
Buck grew up in the Toronto suburb of Etobicoke where his father, George Buck worked for Kodak Canada, giving him an early connection to photography. He attended Ryerson University where he majored in Photographic Arts. During this time he was a photo editor for Nerve, a Toronto monthly music paper, released 3 compilation cassettes of original music with Canadian and American bands with Materials + Processes, and briefly managed experimental rock group Violence & The Sacred. Buck studied at Ryerson under noted street photographer Dave Heath and media critic Murray Pomerance, both of whom continued as mentors in the years after his graduation. He moved to New York in 1990 and has since shot many important magazine and advertising photographs.

== Photographs and work ==
Buck's move to New York in 1990 focused on magazine portrait work, and began a slow progression in the prominence of his celebrity sitters and the stature of his clients. His photography is currently most associated with GQ, Esquire, The Guardian Saturday, and The New York Times Magazine.

Since the late 1990s Buck has photographed a number of commercial campaigns, for Coca-Cola, Google, Microsoft, Kia, Mazda, Old Spice, and TD Bank.

His most recognized portraits include those of Steve Martin, Chris Farley, Margaret Atwood, Willie Nelson, Kendrick Lamar, Eminem, and Jay-Z. Buck has also photographed many American politicians, including Presidents Barack Obama, George H. W. Bush, George W. Bush and Donald Trump. Buck has directed several videos for clients, such as GQ, Wired, SAP SE, Oscar Mayer, and Viagra.

In the spring and summer of 2015 Buck chronicled the adventures and eventual demise of a 3D figurine of himself. The series, called Likeness, included 141 photos and videos released daily on his Instagram account. 56 of the images were included in a limited edition artist book of the series.

In 2008, Chris Buck published the Isn't series, using look-alikes as stand-ins for real celebrities, including Michael Jackson, Bill Gates, and President George W. Bush. The pictures' success come from getting the subjects to pose in ways that the real sittings would be unlikely to do.

Starting in early 2000 he started his Chris Buck’s Chris Bucks series. Inspired by an email he received from a stranger who shared his full name, Buck tracked down his namesakes and photograph them. He shot this project over 18 years, shooting in the US, UK, and Canada. In 2025, it was exhibited at Cafe Alma in San Francisco, featuring 14 photographs.

== Notable and newsworthy ==
In the spring of 2010, photos he took for a Diesel ad campaign that encouraged consumers to "Be Stupid" led to some public outcry and heated editorials. Some ads were banned in the UK. The campaign won the Grand Prix for outdoor at the Cannes Lions International Festival of Creativity.

In August 2011 Buck became the center of a controversy when his Newsweek cover photo of presidential candidate Michele Bachmann caused a media stir. The photo even spawned a hate page titled "Meet Chris Buck, the a-hole who took the Michele Bachmann Newsweek photo." The image prompted a comment from Sarah Palin and spawned several internet memes.

The May 2017 O, The Oprah Magazine focused on race in America, featuring Chris Buck's pictures depicting a flip of societal roles. The viral photos led to interviews with Buck in the Huffington Post, CNN, and Mic.com.

== Books ==
In 2012 Buck's first monograph, Presence: The Invisible Portrait was released by German publisher Kehrer Verlag. Presence features 50 portraits in which the celebrity subjects are fully hiding, and therefore are not visible in the photographs. The book garnered press coverage worldwide, as well as receiving some awards.

In early 2017 Buck published Uneasy: Chris Buck Portraits 1986-2016, a monograph of his celebrity pictures, with 338 portraits and 129 stories behind the pictures. There is also an introduction by Sheila Heti. Press attention included GQ, People, CBC and New York magazine.

In 2021, Buck published Gentlemen's Club: Partners of Exotic Dancers, a collection of forty photo sittings and interviews exploring the relationships of these workers. The book received press coverage from The New Yorker, The New York Times and Refinery29.

== Awards and exhibitions ==
His awards include the Arnold Newman Prize for his portraiture, Ryerson University's Visionary Award (wall of fame at The Creative School), PDN's Notable Books 2012 and German Book Award 2013 Selected Title for his book Presence, and Luerzer's Archive 200 Best Ad Photographers (2012/2013 and 2014/2015). His work has appeared in: American Photography (52 times), Photo District News Photo Annual (22 times), and the Communication Arts Photography Annual (13 times).

His solo shows include:

- 2025 Chris Buck's Chris Bucks, Cafe Alma, San Francisco, CA
- 2022 Past Present Future, Rochester Institute of Technology, Rochester, NY
- 2018 Magnificent Hurt, Florida Museum of Photographic Arts, Tampa, FL
- 2017 Uneasy: Cover to Cover, PictureHouse, New York, NY
- 2017 Uneasy, Krause Gallery, New York, NY
- 2014 Turn of the Century Portraiture, Galerie Youn, Montreal, QC
- 2013 Presence: The Invisible Portrait, Foley Gallery, New York, NY
- 2002 The Sound of Music: New portraits of contemporary musicians, Other Music, New York, NY
- 1998 FanClub, Saba Gallery, New York, NY
