= Matt Gunther (photographer) =

Matt Gunther is a New York–based advertising, editorial, documentary photographer, and director. He is best known the book 'Probable Cause'.

== Career ==
Gunther studied at LaGuardia High School in New York City and earned a Bachelor of Fine Arts degree from the State University of New York at Purchase.

Gunther was with the Newark Police from 2002 and 2011. Family connections had enabled him to gain access and Gunther was able to spend time in police precincts and go on drivealongs with officers.

The book was co-published by Schilt and Magical Thinking. Gunther He has shot celebrities such as Angelina Jolie.
