= Josh Swade =

American documentary filmmaker

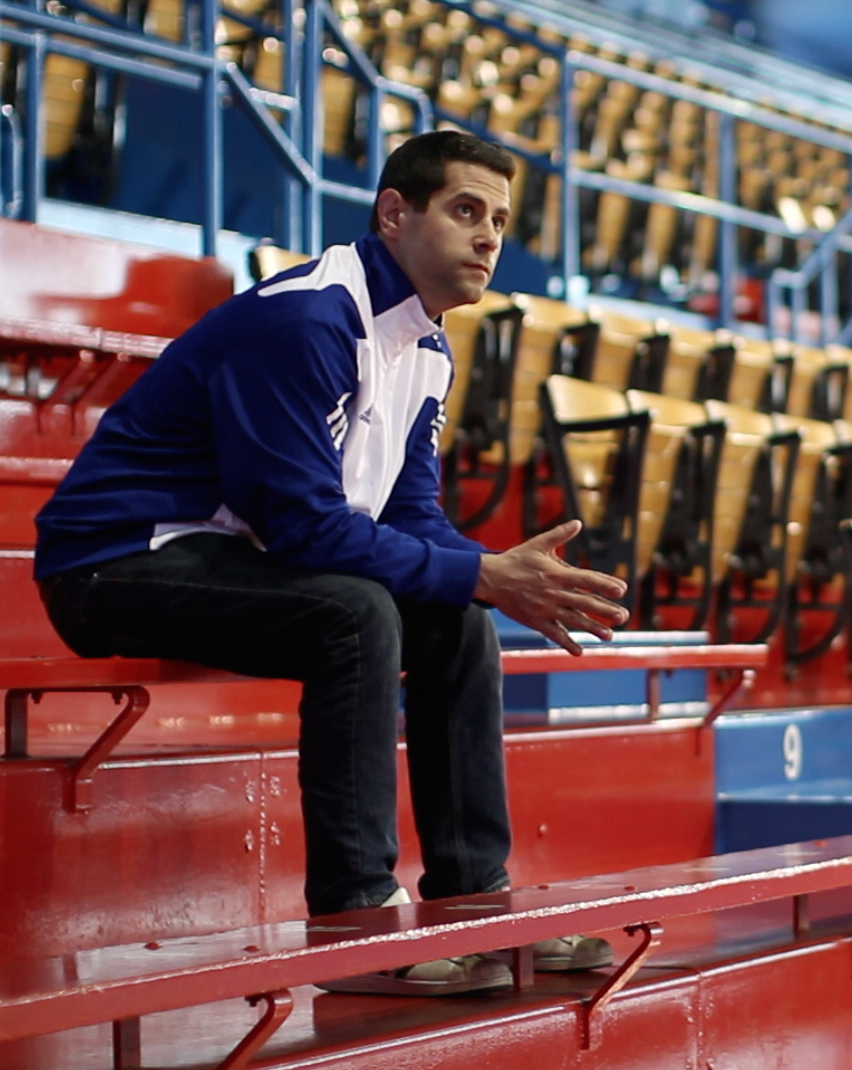
- Born: Kansas City, MO
- Education: University of Kansas; City University of New York
- Occupations: Filmmaker, author
- Years active: 2012–present

Josh Swade is an American documentary filmmaker working primarily in the sports, music, art and fashion genres. His films include Empire Skate, an ESPN 30 for 30 that tells the story of the brand Supreme and how it rose from a tiny New York skateboard shop to a global enterprise. The film premiered in 2025 at the Tribeca Film Festival. Additional feature films include Ricky Powell: The Individualist, about street photographer Ricky Powell, which premiered on Showtime in 2021; One & Done, about basketball player Ben Simmons, which premiered on Showtime in 2016; and the 2012 ESPN 30 for 30 documentary There's No Place Like Home. He has directed and produced several ESPN 30 for 30 Shorts, and several short films on popular musicians, including The Black Keys, Rick Rubin, Sheryl Crow, Major Lazer, and Gary Clark Jr. He also wrote the book The Holy Grail of Hoops: One Fan's Quest to Buy the Original Rules of Basketball.

== Early life and education ==
Swade was born in Kansas City, Missouri. He attended the University of Kansas, before moving to New York City where he became immersed in the downtown music and art scene.

== Career ==
=== Music ===
Swade worked in A&R at Maverick Records, before co-founding the record labels Young American Recordings in 2005 and +1 Records in 2008. In 2014, +1 Records became a division of Lyor Cohen's 300 Entertainment. In 2018, +1 Records partnered with Empire Distribution. The label joined Exceleration Music in 2023.

=== Filmmaking ===
In November 2010, Swade read a New York Times story that James Naismith's original rules of basketball would be auctioned off on December 10, 2010. The ensuing 2012 ESPN 30 for 30 documentary There's No Place Like Home follows Swade, a lifelong Kansas Jayhawks fan, on his attempt to win the auction so that the rules could be housed at the University of Kansas in Lawrence, Kansas, where Naismith coached and taught for the majority of his career. University of Kansas alumnus David Booth and his wife paid $4,338,500 for the rules of basketball, setting a record for the highest sales price for sports memorabilia, according to Sotheby's, which conducted the auction. There's No Place Like Home premiered on ESPN on October 16, 2012. In 2013, Swade’s book The Holy Grail of Hoops: One Fan's Quest to Buy the Original Rules of Basketball was published, with an afterword by University of Kansas basketball head coach Bill Self. It was based on the events in There's No Place Like Home.

In 2014, Swade began work on #BringBackSungWoo, a 30 for 30 Shorts documentary which follows Sung Woo Lee, a South Korean longtime fan of the Kansas City Royals. The 22-minute film premiered on ESPN and Grantland on October 7, 2015.

In May 2015, Swade co-created Rolling Stone Films, where he directed and produced films on musicians including Rick Rubin, The Black Keys, Sheryl Crow, Ringo Starr and Willie Nelson. His short film on Rubin, Rick Was Here, was the first Rolling Stone Films production, and was nominated for a 2014 National Magazine Award for Best Video.

In 2016, production began on One & Done, a feature documentary for Showtime. The film chronicles the life of Australian-born basketball player Ben Simmons, following him beginning in his senior year of high school at Montverde Academy, focusing on his lone year at Louisiana State University, and culminating in his selection as the top pick in the 2016 NBA draft. The film premiered on Showtime in November 2016. The film was noted for the way in which it exposed the inner workings of the amateur basketball system in the United States. New York Times writer Joe Nocera wrote, "'One & Done' will undoubtedly stir outrage among traditional college sports reformers... as well it should."

Swade's film Ricky Powell: The Individualist, about the life and career of New York City street photographer Ricky Powell, premiered at the Tribeca Film Festival and We Are One: A Global Film Festival on May 30, 2020, and on Showtime on December 10, 2021. It features interviews with Powell, Natasha Lyonne, LL Cool J, Chuck D, Laurence Fishburne, and Mike D, and was executive produced by Ahmir "Questlove" Thompson. Powell is renowned for his candid photos of artists including Jean-Michel Basquiat, Andy Warhol, Madonna, Eric B. & Rakim, Run-DMC and the Beastie Boys. Vogue magazine called the documentary "electrifying," writing that it "delivers a heady dose of nostalgia."

In 2025, Swade directed and produced the film Empire Skate. The film chronicles the rise and global influence of NYC’s 1990s skate scene, examining the birth of Supreme and the skaters who transformed a downtown subculture into a worldwide movement. Forbes called the film “a visceral ESPN 30 for 30 documentary that explores how a skate shop helped spark a global fashion and cultural revolution.” The film premiered at the 2025 Tribeca Film Festival and on ESPN and Disney+.

== Filmography ==
Year	Title	Credited as	Notes
2012	There's No Place Like Home	Director	ESPN 30 for 30
2013	Arthur and Johnnie	Producer	ESPN 30 for 30
2014	Rick Was Here	Director	Rolling Stone Films, short film
2015	Willie Nelson and His Famous Guitar: The Tale of Trigger	Producer	Rolling Stone Films
2015	The Big Come Up	Director	Rolling Stone Films
2015	#BringBackSungWoo	Director	ESPN 30 for 30
2015	Tiger Hood	Producer	ESPN 30 for 30
2015	Sheryl Crow: Live at the Bluebird Café	Director	Rolling Stone Films
2015	Ringo Starr: Photographer	Producer	Rolling Stone Films
2015	Major Lazer Take Kingston	Producer	Rolling Stone Films
2016	One & Done	Director	Showtime feature
2016	Becoming: Ben Simmons	Producer, Executive Producer	Disney XD episode
2016	Billy Corgan: Babyfaced Heel	Producer, Executive Producer	Rolling Stone Films
2017	24 Strong	Executive Producer	ESPN 30 for 30
2021	Ricky Powell: The Individualist	Director, Writer, Producer	Showtime
2021	Storied	Director, Producer	Documentary series
2025	Empire Skate	Director, Producer	ESPN 30 for 30

== Bibliography ==
=== Books ===
- The Holy Grail of Hoops: One Fan’s Quest to Buy the Original Rules of Basketball (Sports Publishing, New York, NY, 2013), afterword by Bill Self

=== Articles ===
- "A Love Letter To The Nike Air Max 1…" Nice Kicks, March 26, 2017
