= Sole DXB =

Annual fashion and music festival in Dubai, UAE

- Status: Active
- Genre: Music, fashion, sport, ideas, food
- Date: December 11-13, 2026
- Frequency: Annually
- Venue: The Square Nad Al Sheba (2026) Dubai Design District (2014–2025)
- Locations: Dubai, UAE
- Inaugurated: February 24, 2011
- Founders: Hussain Moloobhoy; Joshua Cox; Kris Balerite; Rajat Malhotra
- Most recent: December 12-14, 2025
- Attendance: 48,000+
- Website: www.sole.digital

Sole DXB is an annual footwear, music, art, and lifestyle festival that takes place in the Dubai Design District in Dubai, UAE. The festival was inaugurated in 2011. Sole DXB returned in December 2022 after a 2 year hiatus with subsequent editions held in 2023, 2024 and 2025. Brands like Nike, Adidas, Puma, Reebok, and others have exhibited at the festival. Speakers and performers have also included Hiroshi Fujiwara, Pusha T, Mobb Deep, Skepta, Hamdan Al Abri, and numerous others.

== History ==
Sole DXB was founded in 2010 by Hussain Moloobhoy, Joshua Cox, Kris Balerite, and Rajat Malhotra. The first Sole DXB event was marketed as a "sneaker summit" and took place on February 24, 2011 at thejamjar, a warehouse art gallery in Dubai's Al Quoz neighborhood. Nike, Adidas, Puma, Vans, and DC (among others) exhibited at the event. It also featured a screening of the short film, The Mystery of the Flying Kicks, and performances by a variety of local musicians and DJs. Around 1,000 people are estimated to have attended.

The second Sole DXB event took place on April 27, 2012 at 8 different galleries and 2 warehouses on Al Serkal Avenue in Al Quoz. Performers included Hamdan Al Abri, Malikah, Shef Codes, and Beat Antenna. Sneaker designer, Nash Money, also created a custom shoe for the event. Around 4,000 people attended.

The third Sole DXB festival occurred on November 14 and 15, 2014 and was the first event of any kind to be held in the Dubai Design District. Brands like Reebok, Puma, House of Hackney, Alexander McQueen, Ray-Ban, and others were represented at the festival. An art gallery displayed works by a variety of artists, including Remi Rough, and the festival also hosted a basketball tournament.

The next edition of the festival was held on November 20 and 21, 2015. The headlining act that year was hip hop duo, Mobb Deep. Darryl McDaniels of Run-DMC also made an appearance. In 2016, the event was held on November 18 and 19 and featured performances from Skepta, Stormzy, Little Simz, BJ the Chicago Kid, and others. Brands that exhibited that year included New Balance, Diesel, Carhartt, K-Swiss, Timberland, and numerous others. Hassan Hajjaj also relaunched the R.A.P. London streetwear brand at the festival.

The most recent edition of the festival took place between December 7 and 9, 2017. It featured speakers and performers such as Pusha T, Hiroshi Fujiwara, GoldLink, Kano, H.E.R., Knxwledge, and others. The festival's focus was contemporary Japanese design. Brands that appeared at the festival for the first time included Visvim, Neighborhood, Wacko Maria, Undercover, and others. The Andy Warhol Museum displayed its final exhibition of "Letters to Andy Warhol."

== See also ==
- Culture of Dubai
- History of Dubai
