= Raven B. Varona =

American photographer

- Born: 1990 (age 34–35); The Bronx, New York, U.S.
- Education: New York University (BA)
- Movement: Photography
- Website: andthebisfor.com

Raven B. Varona (born 1990), also known as Ravie B., is an American photographer. She is best known for serving as an official photographer for Beyoncé and Jay-Z's 2018 On the Run II Tour, for which she was nominated an iHeartRadio award.

== Early life and education ==
Varona was born and raised in the Bronx. She is of Black and Italian descent. She cultivated her interest in photography after taking a class in high school, and continued to shoot as a hobby during college. Varona received her bachelor's degree from New York University.

== Career ==
After college Varona began working full-time as a receptionist at a real estate agency, while taking photography jobs on the side. In 2015 she quit her job to pursue a full-time career in photography.

Later that year, she met Future through a professional connection and was hired to be his lifestyle photographer. She shot his Purple Reign tour. Varona has since photographed rappers such as Kanye West, Drake, Rick Ross, Cardi B, and Migos. She has also worked with Bombay Sapphire.

In 2018, Varona rose to wider prominence when she became an official photographer for Beyoncé and Jay-Z's On the Run II Tour. After sending a Tweet to Jay-Z asking to photograph him, one of Jay-Z's producers contacted her, which led to her being hired for OTRII.

While she had planned to debut her first solo exhibition in March 2020, she delayed opening due to the COVID-19 pandemic. She exhibited a virtual art show, And The B is For, in late 2020. As of June 2021 she is planning a volume 2 of the show.

== Artistry ==
Varona stated in an interview that she pulls inspiration from film. Of her artistry, she seeks to "celebrate the borough she’s from and the people and places that shaped her" through her work and frequently photographs depictions of joy. Lydia T. Blanco of Forbes described her work as "bold, feminine, and culturally relevant."

Varona has spoken about the scarcity of Black women photographers and her desire to serve as a role model.

== Personal life ==
Varona resides in the Bronx.
