= Gillian Laub =

US photographer and filmmaker

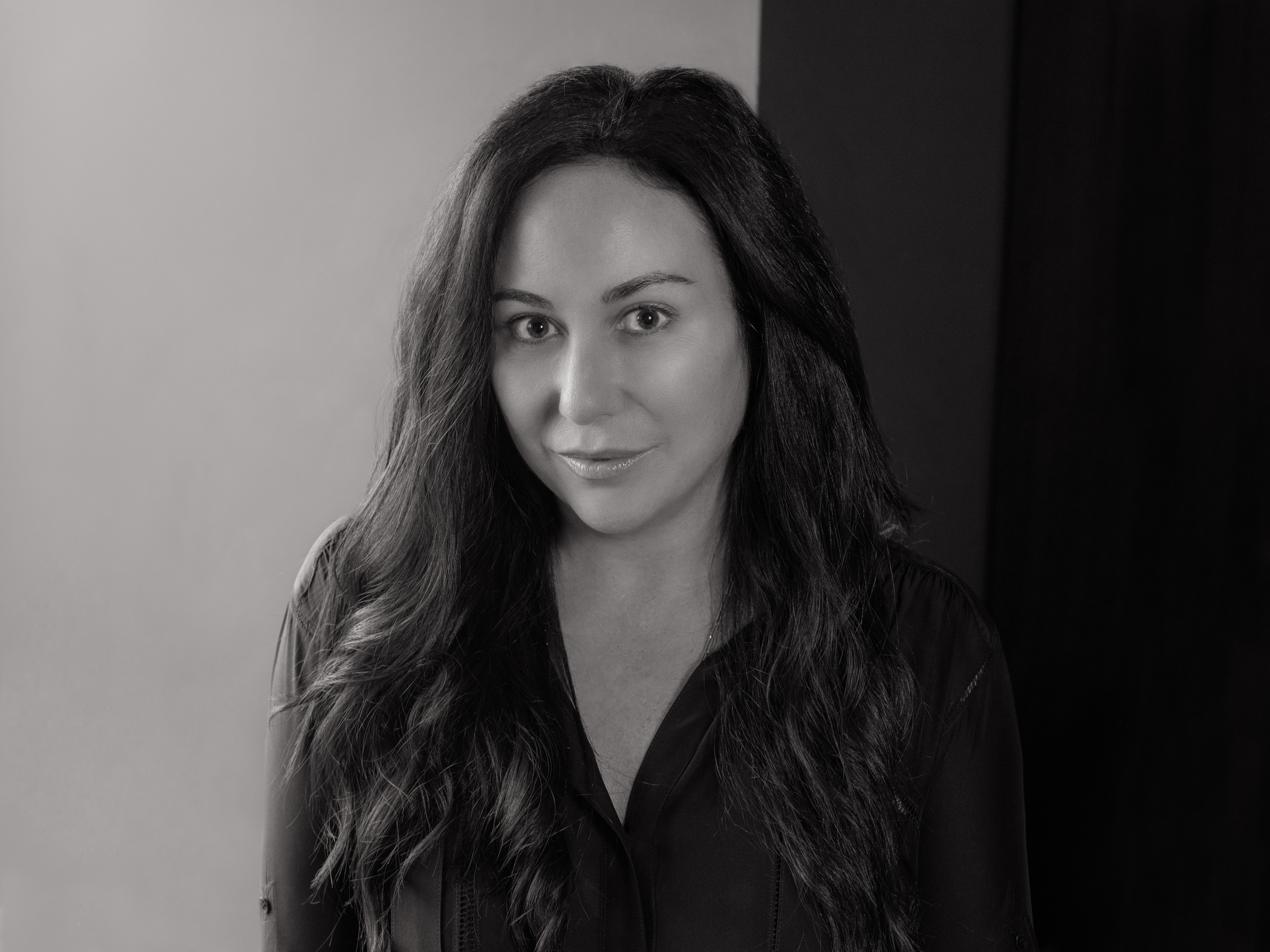
- Gillian Laub
- Born: April 24, 1975 (age 51); Chappaqua, New York
- Education: International Center of Photography
- Alma mater: University of Wisconsin-Madison
- Occupations: Photographer, filmmaker
- Website: www.gillianlaub.com

Gillian Laub (April 24, 1975) is an American photographer, filmmaker, and visual artist whose work explores the intersection of social issues and personal relationships. Her practice combines portrait photography, long-form photo essays, documentary film, and visual storytelling to examine themes including race, conflict, identity, family. and cultural memory.

Over a career spanning more than two decades, Laub has become known for documenting socially charged subjects through intimate portraiture and long-term projects. Her best-known works include Testimony (2007), Southern Rites (2015), Family Matters (2021), and Live2Tell, an ongoing large-scale oral history and portrait project documenting Holocaust survivors.

Laub is the recipient of numerous honors, including a grant from the National Endowment for the Arts, a New York Foundation for the Arts Fellowship, the Aaron Siskind Foundation Fellowship, and the Alice Austen House Award for the Advancement of Photography. In 2019, she received the Distinguished Alumni Award from the University of Wisconsin–Madison.

Her work is held in the permanent collections of the Harvard Art Museums, the Museum of Fine Arts, Houston, the High Museum of Art, the Jewish Museum, the International Center of Photography, the Rose Art Museum, and the Corcoran Gallery of Art, among others.

== Early life and education ==
Laub was born in 1975 and raised in Chappaqua, New York. She graduated from the University of Wisconsin-Madison with a degree in comparative literature before studying photography at the International Center of Photography in New York City.

== Career ==
Laub's work frequently focuses on what have been described as "charged" contemporary narratives, examining how large political and social questions manifest within private lives, families, and small communities. She works across portraiture, photographic essays, and documentary film. Her photographs and films have been commissioned and published by The New York Times Magazine, Vanity Fair, The New Yorker, HBO, TIME, Vogue, and other major publications. Her work is held in several museum collections. She is a recipient of a grant from the National Endowment for the Arts (NEA), a New York Foundation for the Arts (NYFA) Fellowship, and the Aaron Siskind Fellowship. She has also appeared in interviews and features on CBS Sunday Morning, Good Morning America, CNN, MSNBC, NPR, and The View.

Critical reception of Laub’s career frequently emphasizes her distinct empathetic framing and her ability to bridge the gap between subjects and the audience. Cultured Magazine observed that “Laub’s greatest ability is not only to pare the social distance among her subjects, but to collapse the space between viewer and those within her frame”. The publication further noted that her photographs "studiously avoid judgment, no matter how high the stakes," showing people "in all their glorious, savage complexity”. This narrative depth is frequently cited as a hallmark of her practice; Hyperallergic characterized her as a "natural storyteller" who effectively "raises universal, relatable, and lasting questions about love, relationships, and resilience" through both text and imagery.

Reviewers have also highlighted the formal precision and social context embedded within her visual style. Writing for the Los Angeles Times, critics have noted that her "eye is keen" and that "much drama proceeds from the light and landscape and the mortal faces of Laub's subjects working around to an idea".Rather than focusing strictly on isolated events, her broader body of work operates as a cultural commentary. The Washington Post described her output as "a mirror of how all of our lives are complicated roads, pocked with emotional potholes to navigate," describing her portfolio as a narrative "just about all of us can relate to". Her long-term visual documentation has been called "astonishing, and easily her most honest" by W Magazine, while the Forbes 30/50 Summit recognized her initiatives as definitive examples of "the transformative power of storytelling".

== Major projects ==
=== Testimony ===
Laub's first monograph, Testimony (Aperture, 2007), was created as a response to media coverage during the second intifada in the Middle East. The project comprises portraits and first-person accounts from Israeli Jews, Israeli Arabs, Lebanese, and Palestinians directly and indirectly affected by the geopolitical context. The photographs feature both visible physical traces of conflict—such as severe burn injuries and lost limbs—and unseen emotional survival, with each Polaroid portrait accompanied by handwritten journal entries from the subjects.

The publication received the Aperture Emerging Artist Award and established Laub’s reputation for integrating documentary journalism with intimate portraiture.

Writing for The New York Times Magazine, David Rieff praised the project's human specificity:

“The bravery of the photos in this series is that they show what even funerals do not show: the true horror of war and terrorism. They do so in a way that does not seek to turn the people portrayed into types or leech them of their beliefs or prejudices -- of their human specificity, in other words. To consider these images is to be reminded not just of human cruelty and human stupidity but also of human tenacity”.

=== Southern Rites ===
In 2002, Laub began a twelve-year visual study of race and inequality in Montgomery County, Georgia which developed initially from a 2002 Spin Magazine assignment. Her documentation of the community revealed that high school rituals, such as homecomings and proms, remained racially segregated.

In 2009, The New York Times Magazine published her photo essay “A Prom Divided,” which documented the school’s separate white and Black prom traditions. The national attention generated by the story contributed to the integration of the prom the following year and brought wider attention to the continued presence of racial division in the community.

The narrative shifted significantly in 2011 when Justin Patterson, an unarmed 22-year-old Black man whom Laub had previously photographed, was shot and killed by a white town resident. Laub continued to document the town over the next decade, expanding the work into an exploration of systemic discrimination, regional legacy, and structural racism.

Southern Rites also became the basis for the 2015 HBO Southern Rites documentary directed and produced by Laub and executive produced by John Legend, who also composed an original score. The companion monograph, Southern Rites (Damiani, 2015), was named among the year’s notable photo books by publications including TIME, Smithsonian, Vogue, LensCulture, and American Photo.

The documentary received positive critical attention. The New York Times described it as “riveting,” while The Hollywood Reporter characterized it as “an excellent HBO documentary.” The LA Times says of Southern Rites: "There is room here for many different, even contradictory thoughts. But that Laub allows for human messiness as an agent of this tragedy doesn't mean that she denies the social context. Her eye is keen; much drama proceeds from the light and landscape and the mortal faces of Laub's subjects working around to an idea."

=== Family Matters ===
Family Matters (Aperture, 2021) turns Laub's camera on her own family over more than twenty years. The project explores Laub’s own family through photographs, personal writing, archival materials, and reflection, examining the complexities of kinship, memory, identity, privilege, religion, class, and generational change.

Rather than centering solely on political division, the work delves into the evolving relationships within Laub’s family and the tensions that emerge through shifting personal beliefs, life transitions, and changing cultural circumstances. The project considers the ways family narratives are constructed and contested over time, presenting intimate domestic experiences as part of broader questions about belonging, inheritance, and emotional history.

Laub has described the project as an effort to examine the contradictions and vulnerabilities that shape family life, as well as the ways private relationships are influenced by larger social and historical forces. Through portraiture and accompanying text, the work reflects on themes of love, estrangement, reconciliation, and the persistent negotiation of identity within family structures.

A solo exhibition of Family Matters opened at the International Center of Photography in 2021 and later traveled nationally, including presentations at the Contemporary Jewish Museum. The travelling exhibition expanded the project’s reach beyond the book format, incorporating installation elements that emphasized the interplay between personal archive and public narrative.

The project received critical attention from major publications including The New Yorker, The New York Times, The Wall Street Journal, The Washington Post, Hyperallergic, W Magazine, Cultured Magazine, Vogue Interview Magazineand Katie Couric Media.

The Wall Street Journal framed the book and exhibition as Laub's attempt to understand a rift in her family alongside her own relationship to privilege and values, and the Washington Post wrote that it mirrors how “all of our lives are complicated roads.” The Financial Times reviewed the accompanying presentation at the International Center of Photography. Critics noted its layered treatment of family life and its exploration of how personal histories intersect with broader social and cultural realities. It is regarded as one of Laub’s most personal works, extending her documentary practice into the terrain of personal history, where the private and the political are shown to be inseparable, and where documentary photography becomes a form of fine art.

Live2Tell

Live2Tell documents the lives and testimonies of more than 500 Holocaust survivors through portrait photography, filmed interviews, and oral history.

Created in response to rising antisemitism and declining Holocaust awareness among younger generations, the project aims to preserve first-person testimony while survivors are still able to speak directly to future generations.

In 2024, portraits and quotations from the project were projected across New York City landmarks including the Brooklyn Bridge, the Williamsburg Bridge, the Whitney Museum, and other major public sites as part of Holocaust Remembrance Day.

The New York Times characterized the presentation as "a renegade, larger-than-life memorial, a guerrilla art project… and stops New Yorkers in their tracks". CBS News Sunday Morning emphasized the historical weight of the project, noting that "Gillian Laub has given hundreds of Survivors perhaps one last chance to bear witness to a brutality the world should never see again".

Film and short-form projects

In addition to feature documentary work, Laub has directed and produced short films and visual projects including Camouflaged Identity for TIME, Rock of Ages featuring Aretha Franklin, and Rachel Feinstein: Big Guy for Netflix.

== Exhibitions ==
Laub’s work has been widely exhibited in museums and galleries in the United States and internationally. In 2015, her project Southern Rites was presented as a solo exhibition at Benrubi Gallery in New York, following the publication of the accompanying monograph and the release of the HBO documentary of the same name. The exhibition later traveled extensively, including presentations at International Center of Photography, Asheville Art Museum, Atlanta Contemporary, and the George Eastman Museum, where Southern Rites was exhibited in 2023. Her long-term family documentary project Family Matters was the subject of a major solo exhibition, Gillian Laub: Family Matters, at the International Center of Photography in New York in 2021, and later traveled to the Contemporary Jewish Museum in San Francisco in 2022.

In January 2024, Laub launched Live2Tell, a public art project honoring International Holocaust Remembrance Day in New York City. The project featured large-scale nighttime projections of portraits and testimonies of Holocaust survivors displayed across the city, including projections on buildings, public landmarks, and the Brooklyn Bridge. Installed without prior announcement or permits, the projections included portraits, quotes from survivors, and the project’s identifying social media tag “@live2tell,” drawing public attention to Holocaust memory and rising antisemitism. The work formed part of Laub’s broader ongoing effort to document the testimonies of more than 500 Holocaust survivors through portraiture, filmed interviews, and oral history preservation. The project was later featured in a profile segment on the television program CBS Sunday Morning in February 2025, which highlighted the January 2025 Live2Tell installation in Miami, at New World Symphony’s Soundscape Park.

== Editorial and commissioned work ==
Alongside her long-term documentary projects, Laub has undertaken editorial and commissioned assignments for major publications, bringing the same character-driven, intimacy-focused approach to portraiture that defines her independent work. For The New Yorker, Laub photographed the Power Houses series, a tribute to the magazine's 1995 photographic study of iconic New Yorkers' living rooms. The portfolio expands that frame, featuring portraits of influential figures within their private spaces, rendering institutional power with psychological depth and individuality. The series received an ASME Award.

For TIME, her work has ranged from political portraits to extended photo essays, including a cover story on transgender Americans, a subsequent essay on transgender people serving in the military, and a cover story on Parris Island examining identity and culture at the Marine Corps' historic training ground.

For Vanity Fair, Laub's assignments have ranged from a portfolio of LeBron James and his family at home to a photo essay on female gymnasts surviving sexual abuse, reflecting the breadth of her commissioned practice across culture, sports, and public life.

For The New York Times Magazine, Laub photographed "The Sisters Who Treat the Untreatable," a 2016 profile of Catholic nuns providing palliative care to dying cancer patients that conventional medicine had ceased to treat. The work combined documentary portraiture with a meditation on faith, vocation, and compassion at the threshold of death.

Her covers for Town & Country's Philanthropy Issues, including portraits of Mariska Hargitay and Michael and Isabella Strahan, use portraiture to explore public advocacy and personal resilience, framing her subjects through their civic commitments rather than their celebrity.

Across these and other assignments, Laub's editorial work is distinguished by its consistency of approach: a commitment to trust, intimacy, and the revelatory potential of the individual portrait.

== Awards and honors ==
- ASME Award for Best Entertainment and Celebrity Photography (2026)
- NYSCA/NYFA Fellowship in Photography Grant (2019)
- Alice Austen House Award for the Advancement of Photography (2019)
- Distinguished Alumni Award, University of Wisconsin–Madison (2019)
- Aaron Siskind Foundation Fellowship (2014)
- National Endowment for the Arts Grant

== Public collections ==
Laub’s work is included in the permanent collections of:

- Harvard Art Museums
- Museum of Fine Arts, Houston
- High Museum of Art
- Jewish Museum
- International Center of Photography
- Hood Museum of Art
- Rose Art Museum
- William Benton Museum of Art
- Corcoran Gallery of Art

== Teaching and speaking ==
Laub has lectured and taught at institutions including the International Center of Photography, Anderson Ranch Arts Center, the George Eastman Museum, Yale University, the University of Wisconsin–Madison, the Jewish Museum, and the Forbes 30/50 Summit in Abu Dhabi.
