= Vikki Tobak =

Kazakhstani-American journalist, curator, and author

- Born: Almaty, Kazakhstan
- Occupations: Journalist, author, curator
- Website: Vikki Tobak on X

Vikki Tobak is a culture journalist, author, independent curator, and producer born in Soviet-era Kazakhstan who was raised in the United States. She reports about and creates content regarding culture, music, sports and photography.

== Early life ==
Tobak's family immigrated to Detroit, Michigan in the late 1970s when she was five years old. In an interview given to journalist Ben Merlis for the online magazine udiscovermusic.com she commented on her early musical experience, “I landed in Detroit – a predominantly black city, predominantly music-oriented city, where music is everywhere you go. You hear Motown, you hear Aretha and Stevie Wonder, that was my impression of what America was from the start."

It was in Detroit that she immersed herself into early hip hop culture. New York groups like Public Enemy and EPMD were writing about creating identity and demanding respect. The movement inspired her to be closer to the pulse. As a teenager, Tobak moved from Detroit to New York City where, after working for a time as a cashier and doorwoman at the nightclub called Nell's, she got an entry-level job at Payday Records, the label known for such hip hop performers as Jay-Z, Gang Starr, Guru, DJ Premier, Jeru the Damaja, and Mos Def. After just a few months at the company she was promoted to marketing and PR director, which included organizing photography sessions for the artists. She continued to work in the music industry throughout the nineties, experiences that gave her a behind-the-scenes perspective on the rise of hip hop culture. Her insider knowledge on the subject segued into work as a music journalist and also as a music photography curator.

== Career ==
In 2018, she authored the book Contact High: A Visual History of Hip-Hop (published by Penguin Random House/Clarkson Potter). The book features analog photography sessions of hip hop legends complemented by the photographers' personal stories about the images. The Contact prints featured span from the very beginnings of the Hip hop genre until the end of the regular use film photography for music pictures (2007). The book was considered one of Time Magazine's 25 Best Photobooks of 2018. and the New Yorker described the publication as a "Wondrous tribute to the way hip-hop overturned not just the sound of culture but also ways of seeing."

In 2019, The Annenberg Space For Photography in Culver City, California hosted an exhibit entitled Contact High: A Visual History of Hip Hop, based upon the contents of the book in association with the museum's 10th anniversary. The exhibit was curated by Tobak along with creative direction from hip hop artist and journalist Fab Five Freddy. The exhibition traveled to ICP (International Center of Photography) in New York, MAS in Abu Dhabi and The Museum of Pop Culture (MoPOP) in Seattle.

In an interview given to Quartz regarding the exhibit, Tobak stated (specifically in reference to the photographers' contact sheets), “It’s a rare glimpse into their process and allows viewers to see so much more than the final product". She said "The 80’s and 90’s were a time when photographers had greater access to musicians, coinciding with the dominance of music magazines and album cover and magazine cover art”.

In 2022, she authored Ice Cold. A Hip-Hop Jewelry History published by TASCHEN. The book inspired the exhibit curated by Tobak at The American Museum of Natural History in New York.

In 2023, she authored “The Streets Win: 50 Years of Hip-Hop Greatness” published by Rizzoli in collaboration with by LL COOL J.

Tobak is the curator of "For The Win: Objects of Sports Excellence" at The American Museum of Natural History in New York City. The exhibition celebrates the artistry, history, and cultural impact of the world’s most coveted athletic prizes including the NBA Larry O'Brien Trophy and the NFL Vince Lombardi Trophy.

in 2026, she authored and edited Lakers: An Official History of the Purple and Gold (published by TASCHEN).

Her articles have appeared in The Fader, Complex, Mass Appeal, The Undefeated, Paper Magazine, ID Magazine, The Detroit News, and Vibe, and she was formerly the producer and columnist for CBS Market Watch, CNN, Bloomberg News, TechTV, and other media organizations. She was the founding curator of FotoDC's film program, and served as the art commissioner/curator for the Palo Alto Public Art Commission in Silicon Valley. She has lectured about music photography at American University, VOLTA New York, Photoville, the Chicago Cultural Center, and the Museum of Contemporary Art Detroit.
