= Annenberg Space for Photography =

Exhibition space in the Century City in Los Angeles

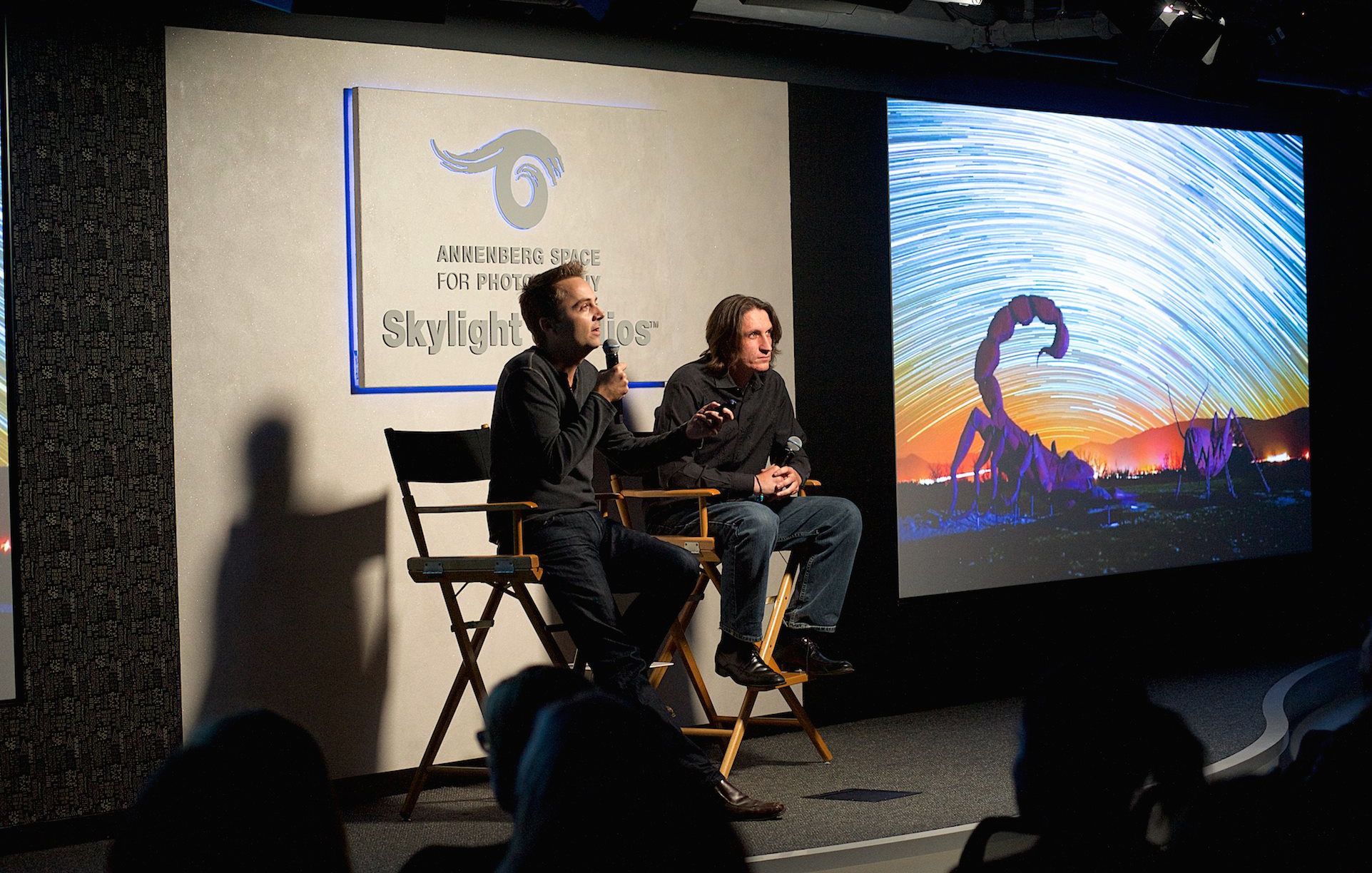
- SKYGLOW event at The Annenberg Photo Space in Los Angeles
- Established: March 2009
- Dissolved: June 2020
- Location: 2000 Avenue of the Stars Ste 10, Century City, Los Angeles, CA 90067-4718
- Coordinates: 34.0478861°N 118.4204968°W
- Type: Photography museum
- Director: Katie Hollander
- Website: www.annenbergphotospace.org

Annenberg Space for Photography was a photography museum in the Century City neighborhood of Los Angeles, California, which operated from 2009 to 2020.

The museum was developed and operated by the Annenberg Foundation and opened in March 2009. After closing in March 2020 due to the COVID-19 pandemic, it announced in June 2020 that it would shut down permanently.

== History ==
The goal, according to project creator Wallis Annenberg, was to encourage visitors to see the world in a new way and gain an understanding of the human condition through the eyes of gifted photographers.

As part of the Walls: Defend, Divide, and the Divine exhibition running from October 5, 2019, to December 29, 2019, was Light the Barricades, an interactive public art installation by Candy Chang and James A. Reeves. The goal of the installation was to encourage viewers to contemplate the inner obstructions that are preventing them from reaching their goals and being their authentic selves. Compound of three walls, as described by Chang herself, each one “shines a light on a particular emotional barrier—resentment, judgement, doubt. On one side of the wall, there was a fable that illuminates that topic…on the other side of the wall were three stools where people can sit down and contemplate a particular question related to the topic.” The installation consisted of three 8’ x 27’ solar-powered walls illuminated from within (similar to a photographer's lightbox).

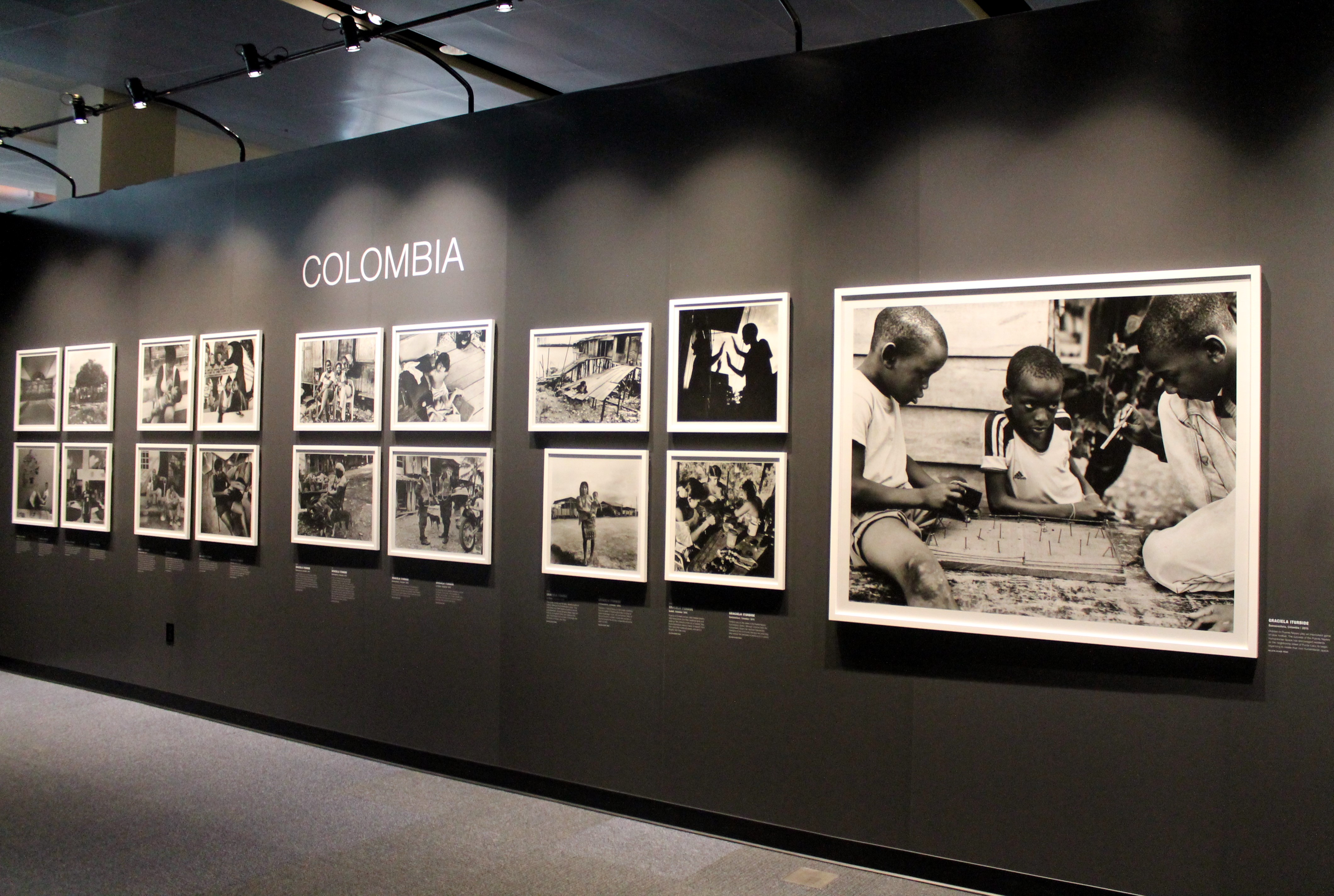
Interior exhibit

=== Tenth anniversary event ===
On April 25, 2019, to celebrate its 10th anniversary, The Annenberg Space for Photography hosted a celebration featuring the opening of two separate photography exhibitions, Contact High: A Visual History Of Hip Hop, in conjunction with the west coast debut of Photoville, NYC's largest photography festival.

=== Closure ===
On June 8, 2020, founder Wallis Annenberg announced that the museum would not reopen following its temporary closure as a result of the COVID-19 emergency. The announcement noted that it had staged 31 exhibitions visited by almost 1 million people during its 10 years of operations. It donated more than 900 high quality prints of 329 contemporary photographers to the Library of Congress.
